= Strategic management =

Initiatives to enhance the performance of firms in external environments

In the field of management, strategic management involves the formulation and implementation of the major goals and initiatives taken by an organization's managers on behalf of stakeholders, based on consideration of resources and an assessment of the internal and external environments in which the organization operates. Strategic management provides overall direction to an enterprise and involves specifying the organization's objectives, developing policies, and plans to achieve those objectives, and then allocating resources to implement the plans. Academics and practicing managers have developed numerous models and frameworks to assist in strategic decision-making in the context of complex organizational environments and competitive dynamics. Strategic management is not static in nature; the models can include a feedback loop to monitor execution and to inform the next round of planning.

Michael Porter identifies three principles underlying strategy:

- Creating a "unique and valuable [market] position".
- Making trade-offs by choosing "what not to do".
- Creating "fit" by aligning company activities with one another to support the chosen strategy.

Corporate strategy involves answering a key question from a portfolio perspective: "What business should we be in?" Business strategy involves answering the question: "How shall we compete in this business?" Alternatively, corporate strategy may be thought of as the strategic management of a corporation (a particular legal structure of a business), and business strategy as the strategic management of a business.

Management theory and practice often make a distinction between strategic management and operational management, where operational management is concerned primarily with improving efficiency and controlling costs within the boundaries set by the organization's strategy.

== Definitions ==
Strategy has been practiced whenever an advantage was gained by planning the sequence and timing of the deployment of resources while simultaneously taking into account the probable capabilities and behavior of competition.

— Bruce Henderson

Michael Porter defined strategy in 1980 as the "...broad formula for how a business is going to compete, what its goals should be, and what policies will be needed to carry out those goals" and the "...combination of the ends (goals) for which the firm is striving and the means (policies) by which it is seeking to get there." He continued that "The essence of formulating competitive strategy is relating a company to its environment."

However, in 1988, Henry Mintzberg described the many different definitions and perspectives on strategy reflected in both academic research and in practice. He examined the strategic process and concluded it was much more fluid and unpredictable than people had thought. Because of this, he could not point to one process that could be called strategic planning. Instead Mintzberg concluded that there are five types of strategies:

- Strategy as plan – a directed course of action to achieve an intended set of goals; similar to the strategic planning concept;
- Strategy as pattern – a consistent pattern of past behavior, with a strategy realized over time rather than planned or intended. Where the realized pattern was different from the intent, he referred to the strategy as emergent;
- Strategy as position – locating brands, products, or companies within the market, based on the conceptual framework of consumers or other stakeholders; a strategy determined primarily by factors outside the firm;
- Strategy as ploy – a specific maneuver intended to outwit a competitor; and
- Strategy as perspective – executing strategy based on a "theory of the business" or natural extension of the mindset or ideological perspective of the organization.

In 1998, Mintzberg developed these five types of management strategy into 10 "schools of thought" and grouped them into three categories. The first group is normative. It consists of the schools of informal design and conception, the formal planning, and analytical positioning. The second group, consisting of six schools, is more concerned with how strategic management is actually done, rather than prescribing optimal plans or positions. The six schools are entrepreneurial, visionary, cognitive, learning/adaptive/emergent, negotiation, corporate culture and business environment. The third and final group consists of one school, the configuration or transformation school, a hybrid of the other schools organized into stages, organizational life cycles, or "episodes".

Some complexity theorists define strategy as the unfolding of the internal and external aspects of the organization that results in actions in a socio-economic context.

Michael D. Watkins (2007) argued that strategic management operates as a critical bridge between an organization's mission, vision, and execution. He asserted that if the mission statement and goals answer the 'what' question, and if the vision statement answers the 'why' questions, then strategy provides answers to the 'how' question of business management. In other words, strategy encompasses the methods, frameworks, and decision-making processes that enable a company to translate its aspirations into concrete actions and competitive success.

== Application ==
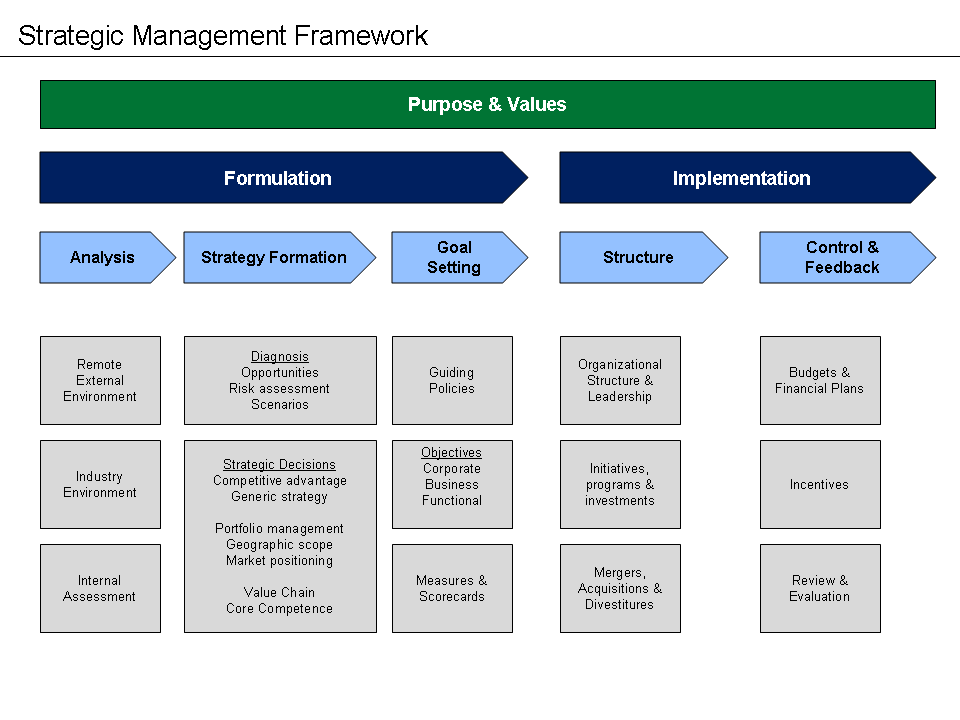
Strategic management processes and activities

Strategy is defined as "the determination of the basic long-term goals of an enterprise, and the adoption of courses of action and the allocation of resources necessary for carrying out these goals". Strategies are established to set direction, focus effort, define or clarify the organization, and provide consistency or guidance in response to the environment.

Strategic management involves the related concepts of strategic planning and strategic thinking. Strategic planning is analytical in nature and refers to formalized procedures to produce the data and analyses used as inputs for strategic thinking, which synthesizes the data resulting in the strategy. Strategic planning may also refer to control mechanisms used to implement the strategy once it is determined. In other words, strategic planning happens around the strategic thinking or strategy making activity.

Strategic management is often described as involving two major processes: formulation and implementation of strategy. While described sequentially below, in practice the two processes are iterative and each provides input for the other.

=== Formulation ===
Formulation of strategy involves analyzing the environment in which the organization operates, then making a series of strategic decisions about how the organization will fulfill its mission. Formulation ends with a series of goals or objectives and measures for the organization to pursue. Environmental analysis includes the:

- Remote external environment, including the political, economic, social, technological, legal and environmental landscape (PESTLE);
- Industry environment, such as the competitive behavior of rival organizations, the bargaining power of buyers/customers and suppliers, threats from new entrants to the industry, and the ability of buyers to substitute products (Porter's 5 forces); and
- Internal environment, regarding the strengths and weaknesses of the organization's resources (i.e., its people, processes and IT systems).

Strategic decisions are based on insight from the environmental assessment and are responses to strategic questions about how the organization will compete, such as:

- What is the organization's business?
- Who is the target customer for the organization's products and services?
- Where are the customers and how do they buy? What is considered "value" to the customer?
- Which businesses, products and services should be included or excluded from the portfolio of offerings?
- What is the geographic scope of the business?
- What differentiates the company from its competitors in the eyes of customers and other stakeholders?
- Which resources, skills and capabilities should be developed within the firm?
- What are the important opportunities and risks for the organization?
- How can the firm grow, through both its base business and new business?
- How can the firm generate more value for investors?

The answers to these and many other strategic questions result in the organization's strategy and a series of specific short-term and long-term goals or objectives and related measures.

=== Implementation ===
The second major process of strategic management is implementation, which involves decisions regarding how the organization's resources (i.e., people, process and IT systems) will be aligned and mobilized towards the objectives. Implementation results in how the organization's resources are structured (such as by product or service or geography), leadership arrangements, communication, incentives, and monitoring mechanisms to track progress towards objectives, among others.

Running the day-to-day operations of the business is often referred to as "operations management" or specific terms for key departments or functions, such as "logistics management" or "marketing management", which take over once strategic management decisions are implemented.

== Historical development ==
=== Origins ===
The strategic management discipline originated in the 1950s and 1960s. Among the numerous early contributors, the most influential were Peter Drucker, Philip Selznick, Alfred Chandler, Igor Ansoff, and Bruce Henderson. The discipline draws from earlier thinking and texts on 'strategy' dating back thousands of years. Prior to 1960, the term "strategy" was primarily used regarding war and politics, not business. Many companies built strategic planning functions to develop and execute the formulation and implementation processes during the 1960s.

Peter Drucker was a prolific management theorist and author of dozens of management books, with a career spanning five decades. He addressed fundamental strategic questions in a 1954 book The Practice of Management writing: "... the first responsibility of top management is to ask the question 'what is our business?' and to make sure it is carefully studied and correctly answered." He wrote that the answer was determined by the customer. He recommended eight areas where objectives should be set, such as market standing, innovation, productivity, physical and financial resources, worker performance and attitude, profitability, manager performance and development, and public responsibility.

In 1957, Philip Selznick initially used the term "distinctive competence" in referring to how the Navy was attempting to differentiate itself from the other services. He also formalized the idea of matching the organization's internal factors with external environmental circumstances. This core idea was developed further by Kenneth R. Andrews in 1963 into what we now call SWOT analysis, in which the strengths and weaknesses of the firm are assessed in light of the opportunities and threats in the business environment.

Alfred Chandler recognized the importance of coordinating management activity under an all-encompassing strategy. Interactions between functions were typically handled by managers who relayed information back and forth between departments. Chandler stressed the importance of taking a long-term perspective when looking to the future. In his 1962 ground breaking work Strategy and Structure, Chandler showed that a long-term coordinated strategy was necessary to give a company structure, direction and focus. He says it concisely, "Structure follows Strategy." Chandler wrote that:

"Strategy is the determination of the basic long-term goals of an enterprise, and the adoption of courses of action and the allocation of resources necessary for carrying out these goals."

Igor Ansoff built on Chandler's work by adding concepts and inventing a vocabulary. He developed a grid that compared strategies for market penetration, product development, market development and horizontal and vertical integration and diversification. He felt that management could use the grid to systematically prepare for the future. In his 1965 classic Corporate Strategy, he developed gap analysis to clarify the gap between the current reality and the goals and to develop what he called "gap reducing actions". Ansoff wrote that strategic management had three parts: strategic planning; the skill of a firm in converting its plans into reality; and the skill of a firm in managing its own internal resistance to change.

Bruce Henderson, founder of the Boston Consulting Group, wrote about the concept of the experience curve in 1968, following initial work begun in 1965. The experience curve refers to a hypothesis that unit production costs decline by 20–30% every time cumulative production doubles. This supported the argument for achieving higher market share and economies of scale.

Porter wrote in 1980 that companies have to make choices about their scope and the type of competitive advantage they seek to achieve, whether lower cost or differentiation. The idea of strategy targeting particular industries and customers (i.e., competitive positions) with a differentiated offering was a departure from the experience-curve influenced strategy paradigm, which was focused on larger scale and lower cost. Porter revised the strategy paradigm again in 1985, writing that superior performance of the processes and activities performed by organizations as part of their value chain is the foundation of competitive advantage, thereby outlining a process view of strategy.

=== Change in focus from production to marketing ===
The direction of strategic research also paralleled a major paradigm shift in how companies competed, specifically a shift from the production focus to market focus. The prevailing concept in strategy up to the 1950s was to create a product of high technical quality. If you created a product that worked well and was durable, it was assumed you would have no difficulty profiting. This was called the production orientation. Henry Ford famously said of the Model T car: "Any customer can have a car painted any color that he wants, so long as it is black."

Management theorist Peter F Drucker wrote in 1954 that it was the customer who defined what business the organization was in. In 1960 Theodore Levitt argued that instead of producing products then trying to sell them to the customer, businesses should start with the customer, find out what they wanted, and then produce it for them. The fallacy of the production orientation was also referred to as marketing myopia in an article of the same name by Levitt.

Over time, the customer became the driving force behind all strategic business decisions. This marketing concept, in the decades since its introduction, has been reformulated and repackaged under names including market orientation, customer orientation, customer intimacy, customer focus, customer-driven and market focus.

=== Nature of strategy ===
In 1985, Ellen Earle Chaffee summarized what she thought were the main elements of strategic management theory where consensus generally existed as of the 1970s, writing that strategic management:

- involves adapting the organization to its business environment;
- is fluid and complex. Change creates novel combinations of circumstances requiring unstructured non-repetitive responses;
- affects the entire organization by providing direction;
- involves both strategy formulation processes and also implementation of the content of the strategy;
- may be planned (intended) or unplanned (emergent); these may differ from each other and also from the realized strategy which results from them (Chaffee, p. 89)
- is done at several levels: overall corporate-level strategy, and individual business-level strategies; and
- involves both conceptual and analytical thought processes.

Chaffee further wrote that research up to that point covered three models of strategy, which were not mutually exclusive:

1. Linear strategy: a planned determination of goals, initiatives, and allocation of resources, along the lines of the Chandler definition above. This is most consistent with strategic planning approaches and may have a long planning horizon. The strategist "deals with" the environment but it is not the central concern.
2. Adaptive strategy: in this model, the organization's goals and activities are primarily concerned with adaptation to its environment, analogous to a biological organism. The need for continuous adaptation reduces or eliminates the planning window. There is more focus on means (resource mobilization to address the environment) rather than ends (goals). Strategy is less centralized than in the linear model.
3. Interpretive strategy: as a less developed model than the linear and adaptive models, dating from the 1970s, interpretive strategy is concerned with "orienting metaphors constructed for the purpose of conceptualizing and guiding individual attitudes or organizational participants". The aim of interpretive strategy is legitimacy or credibility in the mind of stakeholders. It places emphasis on symbols and language to influence the minds of customers, rather than the physical product of the organization.

J I Moore identifies four related levels at which strategies can be devised: enterprise, corporate, business and functional Levels. The functional level applies to specific functional areas within an organisation such as its finance department, HR team or IT section.

In 2004, George Stalk, a Boston Consulting Group writer, distinguished between two extremes of business strategy using baseball metaphors:

- Softball: relying on weak competitive tactics which appear to be "strategic" but in fact "do little more than keep the company in the game for the short term";
- Hardball: engaging with tough competitive strategies, "relentlessly" aiming for success.

== Concepts and frameworks ==
The progress of strategy since 1960 can be charted through a variety of frameworks and concepts introduced by management consultants and academics. These reflect an increased focus on cost, competition, and customers. These "3 Cs" have been illuminated by much more robust empirical analysis at ever more granular levels of detail, as industries and organizations have been disaggregated into business units, activities, processes, and individuals in the search for sources of competitive advantage.

=== SWOT analysis ===
A SWOT analysis, with its four elements in a 2×2 matrix

By the 1960s, the capstone business policy course at the Harvard Business School included the concept of matching the distinctive competence of a company (its internal strengths and weaknesses) with its environment (external opportunities and threats) in the context of its objectives. This framework came to be known by the acronym SWOT and was "a major step forward in bringing explicitly competitive thinking to bear on questions of strategy". Kenneth R. Andrews helped popularize the framework via a 1963 conference and it remains commonly used in practice.

=== Experience curve ===
The experience curve was developed by the Boston Consulting Group in 1966. It reflects a hypothesis that total per unit costs decline systematically by as much as 15–25% every time cumulative production (i.e., "experience") doubles. It has been empirically confirmed by some firms at various points in their history. Costs decline due to a variety of factors, such as the learning curve, substitution of labor for capital (automation), and technological sophistication. Author Walter Kiechel wrote that it reflected several insights, including:

- A company can always improve its cost structure;
- Competitors have varying cost positions based on their experience;
- Firms could achieve lower costs through higher market share, attaining a competitive advantage; and
- An increased focus on empirical analysis of costs and processes, a concept which author Kiechel refers to as "Greater Taylorism".

Kiechel wrote in 2010: "The experience curve was, simply, the most important concept in launching the strategy revolution...with the experience curve, the strategy revolution began to insinuate an acute awareness of competition into the corporate consciousness." Prior to the 1960s, the word competition rarely appeared in the most prominent management literature; U.S. companies then faced considerably less competition and did not focus on performance relative to peers. Further, the experience curve provided a basis for the retail sale of business ideas, helping drive the management consulting industry.

=== Importance-performance matrix ===
Completion of an importance-performance matrix forms "a crucial stage in the formulation of operations strategy", and may be considered a "simple, yet useful, method for simultaneously considering both the importance and performance dimensions when evaluating or defining strategy". Notes on this subject from the Department of Engineering at the University of Cambridge suggest that a binary matrix may be used "but may be found too crude", and nine point scales on both the importance and performance axes are recommended. An importance scale could be labelled from "the main thrust of competitiveness" to "never considered by customers and never likely to do so", and performance can be segmented into "better than", "the same as", and "worse than" the company's competitors. The highest urgency would than be directed to the most important areas where performance is poorer than competitors.

The technique is also used in relation to marketing, where the variable "importance" is related to buyers' perception of important attributes of a product: for attributes which might be considered important to buyers, both their perceived importance and their performance are assessed.

=== Corporate strategy and portfolio theory ===
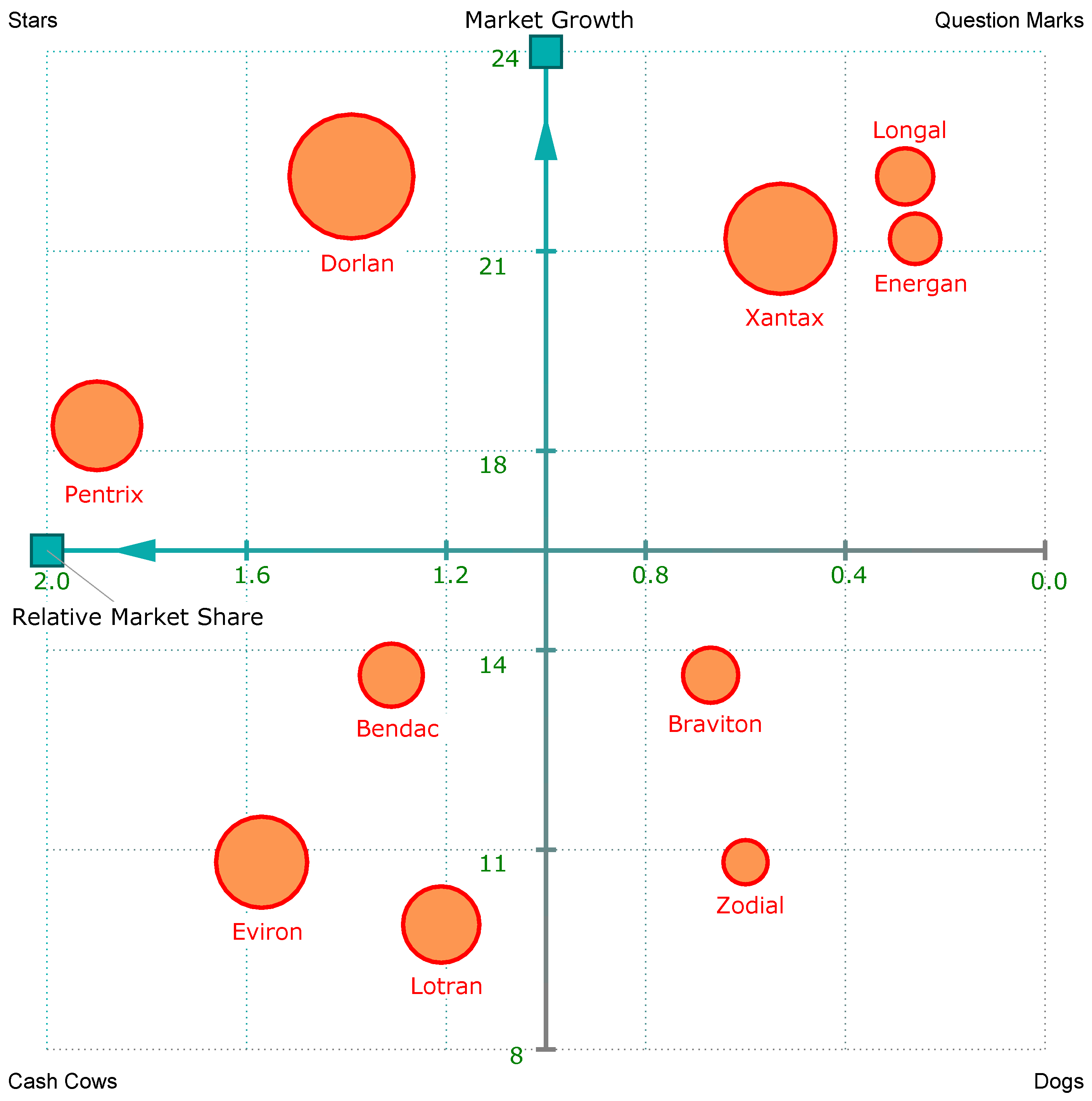
Portfolio growth–share matrix

The concept of the corporation as a portfolio of business units, with each plotted graphically based on its market share (a measure of its competitive position relative to its peers) and industry growth rate (a measure of industry attractiveness), was summarized in the growth–share matrix developed by the Boston Consulting Group around 1970. By 1979, one study estimated that 45% of the Fortune 500 companies were using some variation of the matrix in their strategic planning. This framework helped companies decide where to invest their resources (i.e., in their high market share, high growth businesses) and which businesses to divest (i.e., low market share, low growth businesses.) The growth-share matrix was followed by G.E. multi factoral model, developed by General Electric.

Companies continued to diversify as conglomerates until the 1980s, when deregulation and a less restrictive antitrust environment led to the view that a portfolio of operating divisions in different industries was worth more as many independent companies, leading to the breakup of many conglomerates. While the popularity of portfolio theory has waxed and waned, the key dimensions considered (industry attractiveness and competitive position) remain central to strategy.

In response to the evident problems of "over diversification", C. K. Prahalad and Gary Hamel suggested that companies should build portfolios of businesses around shared technical or operating competencies, and should develop structures and processes to enhance their core competencies.

Michael Porter also addressed the issue of the appropriate level of diversification. In 1987, he argued that corporate strategy involves two questions: 1) What business should the corporation be in? and 2) How should the corporate office manage its business units? He mentioned four concepts of corporate strategy each of which suggest a certain type of portfolio and a certain role for the corporate office; the latter three can be used together:

1. Portfolio theory: A strategy based primarily on diversification through acquisition. The corporation shifts resources among the units and monitors the performance of each business unit and its leaders. Each unit generally runs autonomously, with limited interference from the corporate center provided goals are met.
2. Restructuring: The corporate office acquires then actively intervenes in a business where it detects potential, often by replacing management and implementing a new business strategy.
3. Transferring skills: Important managerial skills and organizational capability are essentially spread to multiple businesses. The skills must be necessary to competitive advantage.
4. Sharing activities: Ability of the combined corporation to leverage centralized functions, such as sales, finance, etc. thereby reducing costs.

Building on Porter's ideas, Michael Goold, Andrew Campbell and Marcus Alexander developed the concept of "parenting advantage" to be applied at the corporate level, as a parallel to the concept of "competitive advantage" applied at the business level. Parent companies, they argued, should aim to "add more value" to their portfolio of businesses than rivals. If they succeed, they have a parenting advantage. The right level of diversification depends, therefore, on the ability of the parent company to add value in comparison to others. Different parent companies with different skills should expect to have different portfolios.

=== Competitive advantage ===
In 1980, Porter defined the two types of competitive advantage an organization can achieve relative to its rivals: lower cost or differentiation. This advantage derives from attribute(s) that allow an organization to outperform its competition, such as superior market position, skills, or resources. In Porter's view, strategic management should be concerned with building and sustaining competitive advantage.

=== Industry structure and profitability ===
A graphical representation of Porter's Five Forces

Porter developed a framework for analyzing the profitability of industries and how those profits are divided among the participants in 1980. In five forces analysis he identified the forces that shape the industry structure or environment. The framework involves the bargaining power of buyers and suppliers, the threat of new entrants, the availability of substitute products, and the competitive rivalry of firms in the industry. These forces affect the organization's ability to raise its prices as well as the costs of inputs (such as raw materials) for its processes.

The five forces framework helps describe how a firm can use these forces to obtain a sustainable competitive advantage, either lower cost or differentiation. Companies can maximize their profitability by competing in industries with favorable structure. Competitors can take steps to grow the overall profitability of the industry, or to take profit away from other parts of the industry structure. Porter modified Chandler's dictum about structure following strategy by introducing a second level of structure: while organizational structure follows strategy, it in turn follows industry structure.

=== Generic competitive strategies ===
Michael Porter's Three Generic Strategies

Porter wrote in 1980 that strategy target either cost leadership, differentiation, or focus. These are known as Porter's three generic strategies and can be applied to any size or form of business. Porter claimed that a company must only choose one of the three or risk that the business would waste precious resources. Porter's generic strategies detail the interaction between cost minimization strategies, product differentiation strategies, and market focus strategies.

Porter described an industry as having multiple segments that can be targeted by a firm. The breadth of its targeting refers to the competitive scope of the business. Porter defined two types of competitive advantage: lower cost or differentiation relative to its rivals. Achieving competitive advantage results from a firm's ability to cope with the five forces better than its rivals. Porter wrote: "[A]chieving competitive advantage requires a firm to make a choice...about the type of competitive advantage it seeks to attain and the scope within which it will attain it." He also wrote: "The two basic types of competitive advantage [differentiation and lower cost] combined with the scope of activities for which a firm seeks to achieve them lead to three generic strategies for achieving above average performance in an industry: cost leadership, differentiation and focus. The focus strategy has two variants, cost focus and differentiation focus."

The concept of choice was a different perspective on strategy, as the 1970s paradigm was the pursuit of market share (size and scale) influenced by the experience curve. Companies that pursued the highest market share position to achieve cost advantages fit under Porter's cost leadership generic strategy, but the concept of choice regarding differentiation and focus represented a new perspective.

=== Value chain ===
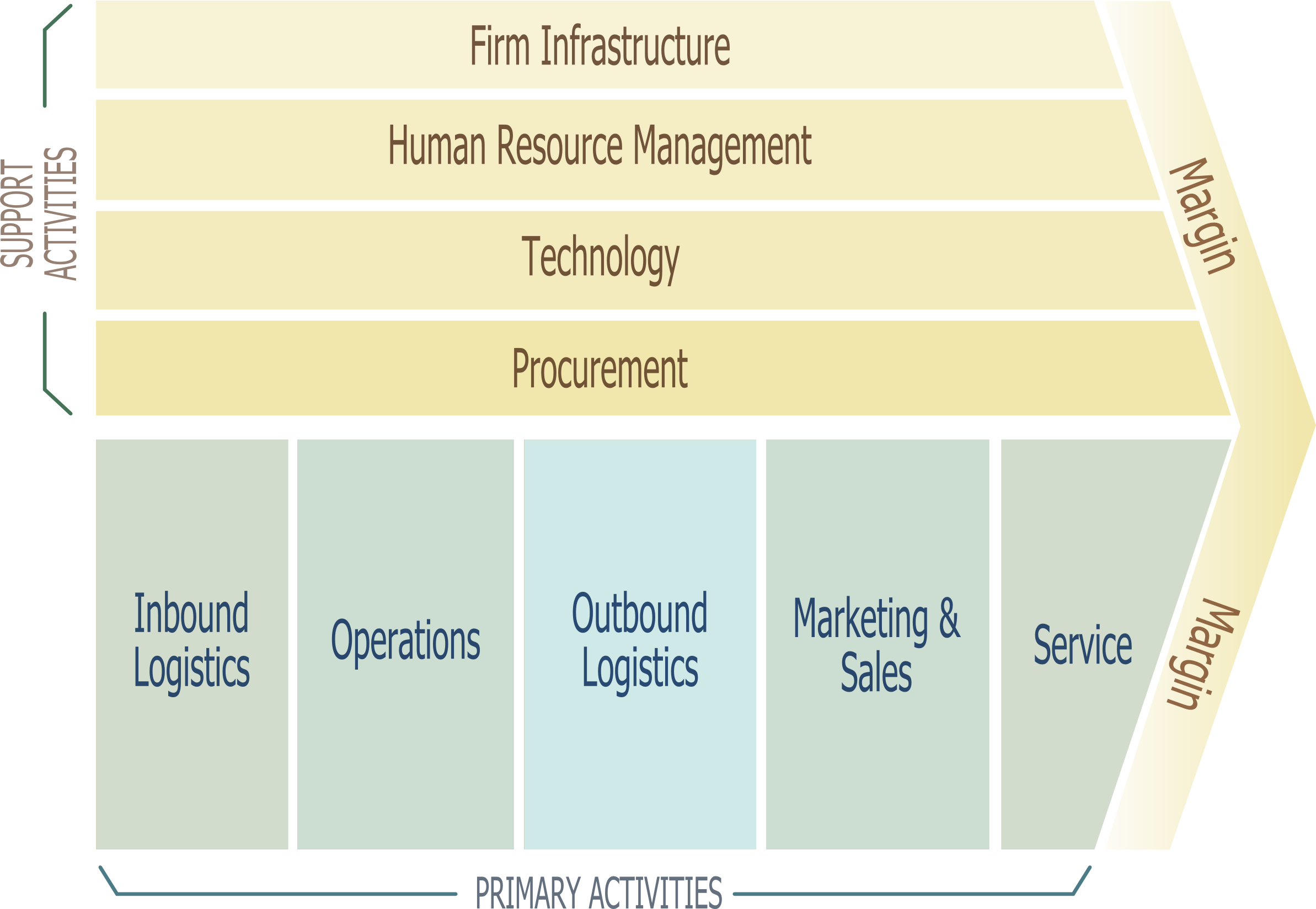
Michael Porter's Value Chain

Porter's 1985 description of the value chain refers to the chain of activities (processes or collections of processes) that an organization performs in order to deliver a valuable product or service for the market. These include functions such as inbound logistics, operations, outbound logistics, marketing and sales, and service, supported by systems and technology infrastructure. By aligning the various activities in its value chain with the organization's strategy in a coherent way, a firm can achieve a competitive advantage. Porter also wrote that strategy is an internally consistent configuration of activities that differentiates a firm from its rivals. A robust competitive position cumulates from many activities which should fit coherently together.

Porter wrote in 1985: "Competitive advantage cannot be understood by looking at a firm as a whole. It stems from the many discrete activities a firm performs in designing, producing, marketing, delivering and supporting its product. Each of these activities can contribute to a firm's relative cost position and create a basis for differentiation...the value chain disaggregates a firm into its strategically relevant activities in order to understand the behavior of costs and the existing and potential sources of differentiation."

=== Interorganizational relationships ===
Interorganizational relationships allow independent organizations to get access to resources or to enter new markets. Interorganizational relationships represent a critical lever of competitive advantage.

The field of strategic management has paid much attention to the different forms of relationships between organizations ranging from strategic alliances to buyer-supplier relationships, joint ventures, networks, R&D consortia, licensing, and franchising.

On the one hand, scholars drawing on organizational economics (e.g., transaction costs theory) have argued that firms use interorganizational relationships when they are the most efficient form comparatively to other forms of organization such as operating on its own or using the market. On the other hand, scholars drawing on organizational theory (e.g., resource dependence theory) suggest that firms tend to partner with others when such relationships allow them to improve their status, power, reputation, or legitimacy.

A key component to the strategic management of inter-organizational relationships relates to the choice of governance mechanisms. While early research focused on the choice between equity and non equity forms, recent scholarship studies the nature of the contractual and relational arrangements between organizations.

Researchers have also noted, although to a lesser extent, the dark side of interorganizational relationships, such as conflict, disputes, opportunism and unethical behaviors. Relational or collaborative risk can be defined as the uncertainty about whether potentially significant and/or disappointing outcomes of collaborative activities will be realized. Companies can assess, monitor and manage collaborative risks. Empirical studies show that managers assess risks as lower when they external partners, higher if they are satisfied with their own performance, and lower when their business environment is turbulent.

=== Core competence ===
Gary Hamel and C. K. Prahalad described the idea of core competency in 1990, the idea that each organization has some capability in which it excels and that the business should focus on opportunities in that area, letting others go or outsourcing them. Further, core competency is difficult to duplicate, as it involves the skills and coordination of people across a variety of functional areas or processes used to deliver value to customers. By outsourcing, companies expanded the concept of the value chain, with some elements within the entity and others without. Core competency is part of a branch of strategy called the resource-based view of the firm, which postulates that if activities are strategic as indicated by the value chain, then the organization's capabilities and ability to learn or adapt are also strategic.

=== Theory of the business ===
According to Peter Drucker, business theory refers to the key points and strategies of a company, which are divided into three parts:

1. The external environment (society, technology, customers, and competition).

2. The goal of an organization.

3. Guidelines essential to achieving the mission.

This business theory has four differentiations:

1. Hypotheses maintain that mission and guidelines must be reality focused.

2. Thoughts must have agreement.

3. The business theory must be notable and interpreted by the members of the organization.

4. Business theory must be continuously analyzed.

Companies have difficulties when the assumptions of such a theory do not align with reality, Peter Drucker took as an example large retail premises, his goal was that people who wanted to buy in large commercial premises do so, but many consumers rejected commercial premises and preferred retailers (which focus on one or two categories of products and have their own premises) time was essential in shopping instead of profits. This theory is classified as an assumption and a discipline, which focused on the elaboration of systematic diagnoses, monitoring and testing of the guidelines that make up the business theory in order to maintain competition.

== Strategic thinking ==
Strategic thinking involves the generation and application of unique business insights to opportunities intended to create competitive advantage for a firm or organization. It involves challenging the assumptions underlying the organization's strategy and value proposition. Mintzberg wrote in 1994 that it is more about synthesis (i.e., "connecting the dots") than analysis (i.e., "finding the dots"). It is about "capturing what the manager learns from all sources (both the soft insights from his or her personal experiences and the experiences of others throughout the organization and the hard data from market research and the like) and then synthesizing that learning into a vision of the direction that the business should pursue." Mintzberg argued that strategic thinking is the critical part of formulating strategy, more so than strategic planning exercises.

General Andre Beaufre wrote in 1963 that strategic thinking "is a mental process, at once abstract and rational, which must be capable of synthesizing both psychological and material data. The strategist must have a great capacity for both analysis and synthesis; analysis is necessary to assemble the data on which he makes his diagnosis, synthesis in order to produce from these data the diagnosis itself--and the diagnosis in fact amounts to a choice between alternative courses of action."

Will Mulcaster argued that while much research and creative thought has been devoted to generating alternative strategies, too little work has been done on what influences the quality of strategic decision making and the effectiveness with which strategies are implemented. For instance, in retrospect it can be seen that the 2008 financial crisis could have been avoided if the banks had paid more attention to the risks associated with their investments, but how should banks change the way they make decisions to improve the quality of their decisions in the future? Mulcaster's Managing Forces framework addresses this issue by identifying 11 forces that should be incorporated into the processes of decision making and strategic implementation. The 11 forces are: Time; Opposing forces; Politics; Perception; Holistic effects; Adding value; Incentives; Learning capabilities; Opportunity cost; Risk and Style.

Classic strategy thinking, and vision have some limitations in a turbulent environment and uncertainty. The limitations relate to the heterogeneity and future-oriented goals and possession of cognitive capabilities in classic definition. Strategy should not be seen only from the top managerial hierarchy visions. The newer micro foundation framework suggests that people from different managerial levels are needed to work and interact dynamically to result in the knowledge strategy.

== Strategic planning ==
Strategic planning is a means of administering the formulation and implementation of strategy. Strategic planning is analytical in nature and refers to formalized procedures to produce the data and analyses used as inputs for strategic thinking, which synthesizes the data resulting in the strategy. Strategic planning may also refer to control mechanisms used to implement the strategy once it is determined. In other words, strategic planning happens around the strategy formation process.

=== Environmental analysis ===
Porter wrote in 1980 that formulation of competitive strategy includes consideration of four key elements:

1. Company strengths and weaknesses;
2. Personal values of the key implementers (i.e., management and the board)
3. Industry opportunities and threats; and
4. Broader societal expectations.

The first two elements relate to factors internal to the company (i.e., the internal environment), while the latter two relate to factors external to the company (i.e., the external environment).

There are many analytical frameworks which attempt to organize the strategic planning process. Examples of frameworks that address the four elements described above include:

- External environment: PEST analysis or STEEP analysis is a framework used to examine the remote external environmental factors that can affect the organization, such as political, economic, social/demographic, and technological. Common variations include SLEPT, PESTLE, STEEPLE, and STEER analysis, each of which incorporates slightly different emphases.
- Industry environment: The Porter Five Forces Analysis framework helps to determine the competitive rivalry and therefore attractiveness of a market. It is used to help determine the portfolio of offerings the organization will provide and in which markets.
- Relationship of internal and external environment: SWOT analysis is one of the most basic and widely used frameworks, which examines both internal elements of the organization—Strengths and Weaknesses—and external elements—Opportunities and Threats. It helps examine the organization's resources in the context of its environment.

=== Scenario planning ===
A number of strategists use scenario planning techniques to deal with change. The way Peter Schwartz put it in 1991 is that strategic outcomes cannot be known in advance so the sources of competitive advantage cannot be predetermined. The fast changing business environment is too uncertain for us to find sustainable value in formulas of excellence or competitive advantage. Instead, scenario planning is a technique in which multiple outcomes can be developed, their implications assessed, and their likeliness of occurrence evaluated. According to Pierre Wack, scenario planning is about insight, complexity, and subtlety, not about formal analysis and numbers.

Some business planners are starting to use a complexity theory approach to strategy. Complexity can be thought of as chaos with a dash of order. Chaos theory deals with turbulent systems that rapidly become disordered. Complexity is not quite so unpredictable. It involves multiple agents interacting in such a way that a glimpse of structure may appear.

=== Measuring and controlling implementation ===
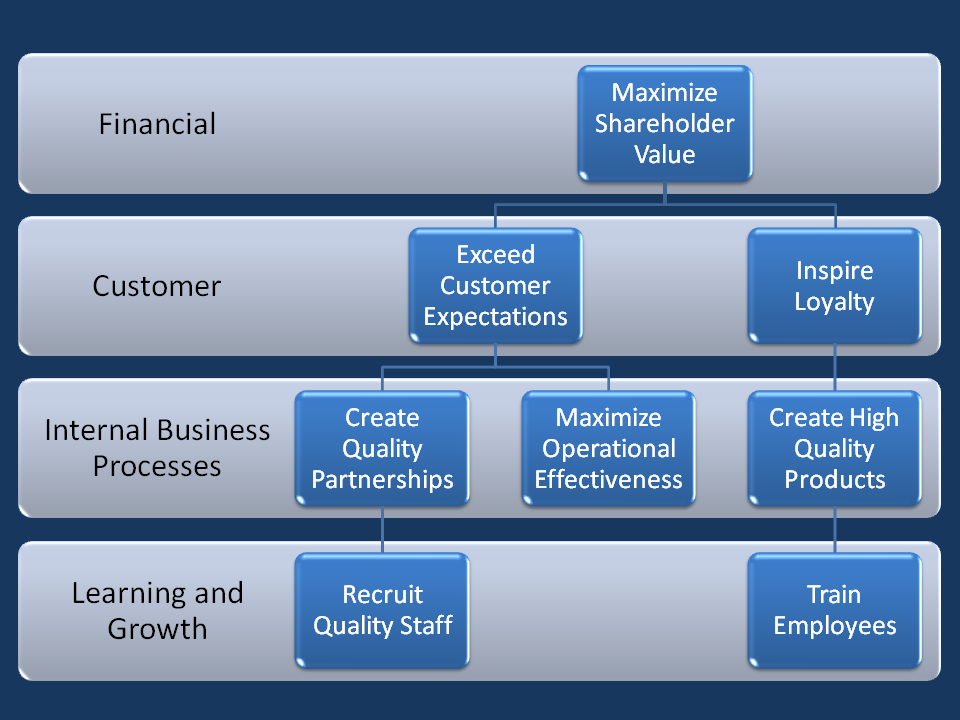
Generic Strategy Map illustrating four elements of a balanced scorecard

Once the strategy is determined, various goals and measures may be established to chart a course for the organization, measure performance and control implementation of the strategy. Tools such as the balanced scorecard and strategy maps help crystallize the strategy, by relating key measures of success and performance to the strategy. These tools measure financial, marketing, production, organizational development, and innovation measures to achieve a 'balanced' perspective. Advances in information technology and data availability enable the gathering of more information about performance, allowing managers to take a much more analytical view of their business than before.

Strategy may also be organized as a series of "initiatives" or "programs," each of which comprises one or more projects. Various monitoring and feedback mechanisms may also be established, such as regular meetings between divisional and corporate management to monitor and control implementation.

=== Evaluation ===
A key component to strategic management which is often overlooked when planning is evaluation. Evaluation may involve looking at what was done (implementation) and what happened as a result, or it may involve evaluating options to see what potential different options may open up, in order to decide on planned actions.

There are many ways to evaluate whether or not strategic priorities and plans have been achieved, one such method is Robert Stake's Responsive Evaluation, that provides a naturalistic and humanistic approach to program evaluation. In expanding beyond the goal-oriented or pre-ordinate evaluation design, responsive evaluation takes into consideration the program's background (history), conditions, and transactions among stakeholders. It is largely emergent, the design unfolds as contact is made with stakeholders.

== Limitations ==
While strategies are established to set direction, focus effort, define or clarify the organization, and provide consistency or guidance in response to the environment, these very elements also mean that certain signals are excluded from consideration or de-emphasized. Mintzberg wrote in 1987: "Strategy is a categorizing scheme by which incoming stimuli can be ordered and dispatched." Since a strategy orients the organization in a particular manner or direction, that direction may not effectively match the environment, initially (if a bad strategy) or over time as circumstances change. As such, Mintzberg continued, "Strategy [once established] is a force that resists change, not encourages it."

Therefore, a critique of strategic management is that it can overly constrain managerial discretion in a dynamic environment. "How can individuals, organizations and societies cope as well as possible with ... issues too complex to be fully understood, given the fact that actions initiated on the basis of inadequate understanding may lead to significant regret?" Some theorists insist on an iterative approach, considering in turn objectives, implementation and resources. I.e., a "...repetitive learning cycle [rather than] a linear progression towards a clearly defined final destination." Strategies must be able to adjust during implementation because "humans rarely can proceed satisfactorily except by learning from experience; and modest probes, serially modified on the basis of feedback, usually are the best method for such learning."

In 2000, Gary Hamel coined the term strategic convergence to explain the limited scope of the strategies being used by rivals in greatly differing circumstances. He lamented that successful strategies are imitated by firms that do not understand that for a strategy to work, it must account for the specifics of each situation. Woodhouse and Collingridge claim that the essence of being "strategic" lies in a capacity for "intelligent trial-and error" rather than strict adherence to finely honed strategic plans. Strategy should be seen as laying out the general path rather than precise steps. Means are as likely to determine ends as ends are to determine means. The objectives that an organization might wish to pursue are limited by the range of feasible approaches to implementation. (There will usually be only a small number of approaches that will not only be technically and administratively possible, but also satisfactory to the full range of organizational stakeholders.) In turn, the range of feasible implementation approaches is determined by the availability of resources.

== Strategic themes ==
Various strategic approaches used across industries (themes) have arisen over the years. These include the shift from product-driven demand to customer- or marketing-driven demand (described above), the increased use of self-service approaches to lower cost, changes in the value chain or corporate structure due to globalization (e.g., off-shoring of production and assembly), and the internet.

=== Self-service ===
One theme in strategic competition has been the trend towards self-service, often enabled by technology, where the customer takes on a role previously performed by a worker to lower costs for the firm and perhaps prices. Examples include:

- Automated teller machine (ATM) to obtain cash rather via a bank teller;
- Self-service at the gas pump rather than with help from an attendant;
- Retail internet orders input by the customer rather than a retail clerk, such as online book sales;
- Mass-produced ready-to-assemble furniture transported by the customer;
- Self-checkout at the grocery store; and
- Online banking and bill payment.

=== Globalization and the virtual firm ===
One definition of globalization refers to the integration of economies due to technology and supply chain process innovation. Companies are no longer required to be vertically integrated (i.e., designing, producing, assembling, and selling their products). In other words, the value chain for a company's product may no longer be entirely within one firm; several entities comprising a virtual firm may exist to fulfill the customer requirement. For example, some companies have chosen to outsource production to third parties, retaining only design and sales functions inside their organization.

=== Internet and information availability ===
The internet has dramatically empowered consumers and enabled buyers and sellers to come together with drastically reduced transaction and intermediary costs, creating much more robust marketplaces for the purchase and sale of goods and services. The Internet has enabled many Internet-based entrepreneurs to tap serendipity as a strategic advantage and thrive. Examples include online auction sites, internet dating services, and internet book sellers. In many industries, the internet has dramatically altered the competitive landscape. Services that used to be provided within one entity (e.g., a car dealership providing financing and pricing information) are now provided by third parties. Further, compared to traditional media like television, the internet has caused a major shift in viewing habits through on demand content which has led to an increasingly fragmented audience.

Author Phillip Evans said in 2013 that networks are challenging traditional hierarchies. Value chains may also be breaking up ("deconstructing") where information aspects can be separated from functional activity. Data that is readily available for free or very low cost makes it harder for information-based, vertically integrated businesses to remain intact. Evans said: "The basic story here is that what used to be vertically integrated, oligopolistic competition among essentially similar kinds of competitors is evolving, by one means or another, from a vertical structure to a horizontal one. Why is that happening? It's happening because transaction costs are plummeting and because scale is polarizing. The plummeting of transaction costs weakens the glue that holds value chains together, and allows them to separate." He used Wikipedia as an example of a network that has challenged the traditional encyclopedia business model. Evans predicts the emergence of a new form of industrial organization called a "stack", analogous to a technology stack, in which competitors rely on a common platform of inputs (services or information), essentially layering the remaining competing parts of their value chains on top of this common platform.

=== Sustainability ===
In the recent decade, sustainability—or ability to successfully sustain a company in a context of rapidly changing environmental, social, health, and economic circumstances—has emerged as crucial aspect of any strategy development. Research focusing on sustainability in commercial strategies has led to emergence of the concept of "embedded sustainability" – defined by its authors Chris Laszlo and Nadya Zhexembayeva as "incorporation of environmental, health, and social value into the core business with no trade-off in price or quality—in other words, with no social or green premium." Their research showed that embedded sustainability offers at least seven distinct opportunities for business value and competitive advantage creation: a) better risk management, b) increased efficiency through reduced waste and resource use, c) better product differentiation, d) new market entrances, e) enhanced brand and reputation, f) greater opportunity to influence industry standards, and g) greater opportunity for radical innovation. Research further suggested that innovation driven by resource depletion can result in fundamental competitive advantages for a company's products and services, as well as the company strategy as a whole, when right principles of innovation are applied. Asset managers who committed to integrating embedded sustainability factors in their capital allocation decisions created a stronger return on investment than managers that did not strategically integrate sustainability into their similar business model.

To achieve genuine sustainability and these associated benefits, corporations have historically relied on a variety of mechanisms that can be integrated into their management strategy. Timothy Galpin in his chapter of "Business Strategies for Sustainability: A Research Anthology" discusses four "Internal Strategic Management Components" to build sustainability. They are as follows:

- Mission: Defines the purpose and priorities of the organization, ultimately providing critical signals to organizational stakeholders regarding the aims of the firm.
- Values: Refers to the expectations of internal stakeholders, and communicates the organisation's belief system to various external stakeholders
- Goals: Provides a roadmap of the firm's organisational activity and a basis for which to measure progress and performance.
- Capabilities and resources: The development of patterns of activity and investment decisions that facilitate sustainable business practices.

To fully utilise these strategic management components, a firm's mission, values, goals, resources, and capabilities need to be functioning in alignment with one another. This develops consistency across management and employee behaviour. Research has indicated that this alignment has led to improved firm performance.

Following the embedding of sustainability in a firm's strategic management plan, to fully reap the benefits the agenda must be communicated effectively to internal and external stakeholders. Doing so satisfies stakeholder theory, whereby the firm maintains 'trustful and mutually respectful relationships with the various stakeholders'. In the past, this has consisted of advertising and disclosing sustainability information and reports. Firms are available to promote their superior sustainability performance and ultimately possess higher market valuations in comparison to firms that do not provide sustainability reporting.

The amalgamation and alignment of these key internal strategic management components, in conjunction with thorough communication of the firm's sustainability agenda, are required to achieve these associated benefits and are the reason many firms are pursuing such tactics more frequently.

== Strategy as learning ==
=== Learning organization ===
In 1990, Peter Senge, who had collaborated with Arie de Geus at Dutch Shell, popularized de Geus' notion of the "learning organization". The theory is that gathering and analyzing information is a necessary requirement for business success in the information age. To do this, Senge claimed that an organization would need to be structured such that:

- People can continuously expand their capacity to learn and be productive.
- New patterns of thinking are nurtured.
- Collective aspirations are encouraged.
- People are encouraged to see the "whole picture" together.

Senge identified five disciplines of a learning organization. They are:

- Personal responsibility, self-reliance, and mastery – We accept that we are the masters of our own destiny. We make decisions and live with the consequences of them. When a problem needs to be fixed, or an opportunity exploited, we take the initiative to learn the required skills to get it done.
- Mental models – We need to explore our personal mental models to understand the subtle effect they have on our behaviour.
- Shared vision – The vision of where we want to be in the future is discussed and communicated to all. It provides guidance and energy for the journey ahead.
- Team learning – We learn together in teams. This involves a shift from "a spirit of advocacy to a spirit of enquiry".
- Systems thinking – We look at the whole rather than the parts. This is what Senge calls the "Fifth discipline". It is the glue that integrates the other four into a coherent strategy. For an alternative approach to the "learning organization", see Garratt, B. (1987).

Geoffrey Moore (1991) and R. Frank and P. Cook also detected a shift in the nature of competition. Markets driven by technical standards or by "network effects" can give the dominant firm a near-monopoly. The same is true of networked industries in which interoperability requires compatibility between users. Examples include Internet Explorer's and Amazon's early dominance of their respective industries. IE's later decline shows that such dominance may be only temporary.

Moore showed how firms could attain this enviable position by using E.M. Rogers' five stage adoption process and focusing on one group of customers at a time, using each group as a base for reaching the next group. The most difficult step is making the transition between introduction and mass acceptance. (See Crossing the Chasm). If successful a firm can create a bandwagon effect in which the momentum builds and its product becomes a de facto standard.

=== Integrated view to learning ===
Bolisani & Bratianu (2017) have defined knowledge strategy as an integration of rational thinking and dynamic learning. Rational planning contains a three-step process where the first step is to collect information, the second step is to analyze the information and the third step is to formulate goals and plans based on information. Emergent planning also contains three steps to the opposite direction starting from practical experience, what is analyzed in the second step, and then formulated to a strategy in the third step. These two approaches are combined to the "integrated view" with the Bolisani and Bratianu research implications. To start the planning process for knowledge and KM strategy creation, company can prepare a preliminary plan with the basis of rational analysis from internal or external environments. While creating rational and predictive plans, company can similarly utilize practical adapted knowledge for example learning from the ground. The idea behind the integrated view is to combine the general visions of knowledge strategy with both the current practical understanding and future ideas. This model will move the decision-making process in a more interactive and co-creative direction.

== Strategy as adapting to change ==
In 1969, Peter Drucker coined the phrase Age of Discontinuity to describe the way change disrupts lives. In an age of continuity attempts to predict the future by extrapolating from the past can be accurate. But according to Drucker, we are now in an age of discontinuity and extrapolating is ineffective. He identifies four sources of discontinuity: new technologies, globalization, cultural pluralism and knowledge capital.

In 1970, Alvin Toffler in Future Shock described a trend towards accelerating rates of change. He illustrated how social and technical phenomena had shorter lifespans with each generation, and he questioned society's ability to cope with the resulting turmoil and accompanying anxiety. In past eras periods of change were always punctuated with times of stability. This allowed society to assimilate the change before the next change arrived. But these periods of stability had all but disappeared by the late 20th century. In 1980 in The Third Wave, Toffler characterized this shift to relentless change as the defining feature of the third phase of civilization (the first two phases being the agricultural and industrial waves).

In 1978, Derek F. Abell (Abell, D. 1978) described "strategic windows" and stressed the importance of the timing (both entrance and exit) of any given strategy. This led some strategic planners to build planned obsolescence into their strategies.

In 1983, Noel Tichy wrote that because we are all beings of habit we tend to repeat what we are comfortable with. He wrote that this is a trap that constrains our creativity, prevents us from exploring new ideas, and hampers our dealing with the full complexity of new issues. He developed a systematic method of dealing with change that involved looking at any new issue from three angles: technical and production, political and resource allocation, and corporate culture.

In 1989, Charles Handy identified two types of change. "Strategic drift" is a gradual change that occurs so subtly that it is not noticed until it is too late. By contrast, "transformational change" is sudden and radical. It is typically caused by discontinuities (or exogenous shocks) in the business environment. The point where a new trend is initiated is called a "strategic inflection point" by Andy Grove. Inflection points can be subtle or radical.

In 1990, Richard Pascale wrote that relentless change requires that businesses continuously reinvent themselves. His famous maxim is "Nothing fails like success" by which he means that what was a strength yesterday becomes the root of weakness today, We tend to depend on what worked yesterday and refuse to let go of what worked so well for us in the past. Prevailing strategies become self-confirming. To avoid this trap, businesses must stimulate a spirit of inquiry and healthy debate. They must encourage a creative process of self-renewal based on constructive conflict.

In 1996, Adrian Slywotzky showed how changes in the business environment are reflected in value migrations between industries, between companies, and within companies. He claimed that recognizing the patterns behind these value migrations is necessary if we wish to understand the world of chaotic change. In "Profit Patterns" (1999) he described businesses as being in a state of strategic anticipation as they try to spot emerging patterns. Slywotsky and his team identified 30 patterns that have transformed industry after industry.

In 1997, Clayton Christensen (1997) took the position that great companies can fail precisely because they do everything right since the capabilities of the organization also define its disabilities. Christensen's thesis is that outstanding companies lose their market leadership when confronted with disruptive technology. He called the approach to discovering the emerging markets for disruptive technologies agnostic marketing, i.e., marketing under the implicit assumption that no one – not the company, not the customers – can know how or in what quantities a disruptive product can or will be used without the experience of using it.

In 1999, Constantinos Markides reexamined the nature of strategic planning. He described strategy formation and implementation as an ongoing, never-ending, integrated process requiring continuous reassessment and reformation. Strategic management is planned and emergent, dynamic and interactive.

J. Moncrieff (1999) stressed strategy dynamics. He claimed that strategy is partially deliberate and partially unplanned. The unplanned element comes from emergent strategies that result from the emergence of opportunities and threats in the environment and from "strategies in action" (ad hoc actions across the organization).

David Teece pioneered research on resource-based strategic management and the dynamic capabilities perspective, defined as "the ability to integrate, build, and reconfigure internal and external competencies to address rapidly changing environments". His 1997 paper (with Gary Pisano and Amy Shuen) "Dynamic Capabilities and Strategic Management" was the most cited paper in economics and business for the period from 1995 to 2005.

In 2000, Gary Hamel discussed strategic decay, the notion that the value of every strategy, no matter how brilliant, decays over time.

== Strategy as operational excellence ==
=== Quality ===
A large group of theorists felt the area where western business was most lacking was product quality. W. Edwards Deming, Joseph M. Juran, Andrew Thomas Kearney, Philip Crosby and Armand V. Feigenbaum suggested quality improvement techniques such total quality management (TQM), continuous improvement (kaizen), lean manufacturing, Six Sigma, and return on quality (ROQ).

Contrarily, James Heskett (1988), Earl Sasser (1995), William Davidow, Len Schlesinger, A. Paraurgman (1988), Len Berry, Jane Kingman-Brundage, Christopher Hart, and Christopher Lovelock (1994), felt that poor customer service was the problem. They gave us fishbone diagramming, service charting, Total Customer Service (TCS), the service profit chain, service gaps analysis, the service encounter, strategic service vision, service mapping, and service teams. Their underlying assumption was that there is no better source of competitive advantage than a continuous stream of delighted customers.

Process management uses some of the techniques from product quality management and some of the techniques from customer service management. It looks at an activity as a sequential process. The objective is to find inefficiencies and make the process more effective. Although the procedures have a long history, dating back to Taylorism, the scope of their applicability has been greatly widened, leaving no aspect of the firm free from potential process improvements. Because of the broad applicability of process management techniques, they can be used as a basis for competitive advantage.

Carl Sewell, Frederick F. Reichheld, Christian Grönroos, and Earl Sasser observed that businesses were spending more on customer acquisition than on retention. They showed how a competitive advantage could be found in ensuring that customers returned again and again. Reicheld broadened the concept to include loyalty from employees, suppliers, distributors and shareholders. They developed techniques for estimating customer lifetime value (CLV) for assessing long-term relationships. The concepts begat attempts to recast selling and marketing into a long term endeavor that created a sustained relationship (called relationship selling, relationship marketing, and customer relationship management). Customer relationship management (CRM) software became integral to many firms.

=== Reengineering ===
Michael Hammer and James Champy felt that these resources needed to be restructured. In a process that they labeled reengineering, firm's reorganized their assets around whole processes rather than tasks. In this way a team of people saw a project through, from inception to completion. This avoided functional silos where isolated departments seldom talked to each other. It also eliminated waste due to functional overlap and interdepartmental communications.

In 1989 Richard Lester and the researchers at the MIT Industrial Performance Center identified seven best practices and concluded that firms must accelerate the shift away from the mass production of low cost standardized products. The seven areas of best practice were:

- Simultaneous continuous improvement in cost, quality, service, and product innovation
- Breaking down organizational barriers between departments
- Eliminating layers of management creating flatter organizational hierarchies.
- Closer relationships with customers and suppliers
- Intelligent use of new technology
- Global focus
- Improving human resource skills

The search for best practices is also called benchmarking. This involves determining where you need to improve, finding an organization that is exceptional in this area, then studying the company and applying its best practices in your firm.

== Other perspectives on strategy ==
=== Strategy as problem solving ===
Professor Richard P. Rumelt described strategy as a type of problem solving in 2011. He wrote that good strategy has an underlying structure called a kernel. The kernel has three parts: 1) A diagnosis that defines or explains the nature of the challenge; 2) A guiding policy for dealing with the challenge; and 3) Coherent actions designed to carry out the guiding policy. President Kennedy outlined these three elements of strategy in his Cuban Missile Crisis Address to the Nation of 22 October 1962:

1. Diagnosis: "This Government, as promised, has maintained the closest surveillance of the Soviet military buildup on the island of Cuba. Within the past week, unmistakable evidence has established the fact that a series of offensive missile sites is now in preparation on that imprisoned island. The purpose of these bases can be none other than to provide a nuclear strike capability against the Western Hemisphere."
2. Guiding Policy: "Our unswerving objective, therefore, must be to prevent the use of these missiles against this or any other country, and to secure their withdrawal or elimination from the Western Hemisphere."
3. Action Plans: First among seven numbered steps was the following: "To halt this offensive buildup a strict quarantine on all offensive military equipment under shipment to Cuba is being initiated. All ships of any kind bound for Cuba from whatever nation or port will, if found to contain cargoes of offensive weapons, be turned back."

Active strategic management required active information gathering and active problem solving. In the early days of Hewlett-Packard (HP), Dave Packard and Bill Hewlett devised an active management style that they called management by walking around (MBWA). Senior HP managers were seldom at their desks. They spent most of their days visiting employees, customers, and suppliers. This direct contact with key people provided them with a solid grounding from which viable strategies could be crafted. Management consultants Tom Peters and Robert H. Waterman had used the term in their 1982 book In Search of Excellence: Lessons From America's Best-Run Companies. Some Japanese managers employ a similar system, which originated at Honda, and is sometimes called the 3 G's (Genba, Genbutsu, and Genjitsu, which translate into "actual place", "actual thing", and "actual situation").

=== Creative vs analytic approaches ===
In 2010, IBM released a study summarizing three conclusions of 1500 CEOs around the world: 1) complexity is escalating, 2) enterprises are not equipped to cope with this complexity, and 3) creativity is now the single most important leadership competency. IBM said that it is needed in all aspects of leadership, including strategic thinking and planning.

Similarly, McKeown argued that over-reliance on any particular approach to strategy is dangerous and that multiple methods can be used to combine the creativity and analytics to create an "approach to shaping the future", that is difficult to copy.

=== Non-strategic management ===
A 1938 treatise by Chester Barnard, based on his own experience as a business executive, described the process as informal, intuitive, non-routinized and involving primarily oral, 2-way communications. Bernard says "The process is the sensing of the organization as a whole and the total situation relevant to it. It transcends the capacity of merely intellectual methods, and the techniques of discriminating the factors of the situation. The terms pertinent to it are "feeling", "judgement", "sense", "proportion", "balance", "appropriateness". It is a matter of art rather than science."

In 1973, Mintzberg found that senior managers typically deal with unpredictable situations so they strategize in ad hoc, flexible, dynamic, and implicit ways. He wrote, "The job breeds adaptive information-manipulators who prefer the live concrete situation. The manager works in an environment of stimulus-response, and he develops in his work a clear preference for live action."

In 1982, John Kotter studied the daily activities of 15 executives and concluded that they spent most of their time developing and working a network of relationships that provided general insights and specific details for strategic decisions. They tended to use "mental road maps" rather than systematic planning techniques.

Daniel Isenberg's 1984 study of senior managers found that their decisions were highly intuitive. Executives often sensed what they were going to do before they could explain why. He claimed in 1986 that one of the reasons for this is the complexity of strategic decisions and the resultant information uncertainty.

Zuboff claimed that information technology was widening the divide between senior managers (who typically make strategic decisions) and operational level managers (who typically make routine decisions). She alleged that prior to the widespread use of computer systems, managers, even at the most senior level, engaged in both strategic decisions and routine administration, but as computers facilitated (She called it "deskilled") routine processes, these activities were moved further down the hierarchy, leaving senior management free for strategic decision making.

In 1977, Abraham Zaleznik distinguished leaders from managers. He described leaders as visionaries who inspire, while managers care about process. He claimed that the rise of managers was the main cause of the decline of American business in the 1970s and 1980s. Lack of leadership is most damaging at the level of strategic management where it can paralyze an entire organization.

According to Corner, Kinichi, and Keats, strategic decision making in organizations occurs at two levels: individual and aggregate. They developed a model of parallel strategic decision making. The model identifies two parallel processes that involve getting attention, encoding information, storage and retrieval of information, strategic choice, strategic outcome and feedback. The individual and organizational processes interact at each stage. For instance, competition-oriented objectives are based on the knowledge of competing firms, such as their market share.

=== Strategy as marketing ===
The 1980s also saw the widespread acceptance of positioning theory. Although the theory originated with Jack Trout in 1969, it didn't gain wide acceptance until Al Ries and Jack Trout wrote their classic book Positioning: The Battle For Your Mind (1979). The basic premise is that a strategy should not be judged by internal company factors but by the way customers see it relative to the competition. Crafting and implementing a strategy involves creating a position in the mind of the collective consumer. Several techniques enabled the practical use of positioning theory. Perceptual mapping for example, creates visual displays of the relationships between positions. Multidimensional scaling, discriminant analysis, factor analysis and conjoint analysis are mathematical techniques used to determine the most relevant characteristics (called dimensions or factors) upon which positions should be based. Preference regression can be used to determine vectors of ideal positions and cluster analysis can identify clusters of positions.

In 1992 Jay Barney saw strategy as assembling the optimum mix of resources, including human, technology and suppliers, and then configuring them in unique and sustainable ways.

James Gilmore and Joseph Pine found competitive advantage in mass customization. Flexible manufacturing techniques allowed businesses to individualize products for each customer without losing economies of scale. This effectively turned the product into a service. They also realized that if a service is mass-customized by creating a "performance" for each individual client, that service would be transformed into an "experience". Their book, The Experience Economy, along with the work of Bernd Schmitt, convinced many to see service provision as a form of theatre. This school of thought is sometimes referred to as customer experience management (CEM).

=== Information- and technology-driven strategy ===
Many industries with a high information component are being transformed. For example, Encarta demolished Encyclopædia Britannica (whose sales have plummeted 80% since their peak of $650 million in 1990) before it was, in turn, eclipsed by collaborative encyclopedias like Wikipedia. The music industry was similarly disrupted. The technology sector has provided some strategies directly. For example, from the software development industry agile software development provides a model for shared development processes.

Peter Drucker conceived of the "knowledge worker" in the 1950s. He described how fewer workers would do physical labor, and more would apply their minds. In 1984, John Naisbitt theorized that the future would be driven largely by information: companies that managed information well could obtain an advantage, however the profitability of what he called "information float" (information that the company had and others desired) would disappear as inexpensive computers made information more accessible.

Daniel Bell (1985) examined the sociological consequences of information technology, while Gloria Schuck and Shoshana Zuboff looked at psychological factors. Zuboff distinguished between "automating technologies" and "informating technologies". She studied the effect that both had on workers, managers and organizational structures. She largely confirmed Drucker's predictions about the importance of flexible decentralized structure, work teams, knowledge sharing and the knowledge worker's central role. Zuboff also detected a new basis for managerial authority, based on knowledge (also predicted by Drucker) which she called "participative management".

=== Regulatory strategy ===
An organisation's regulatory strategy accounts for how the organisation will respond to its regulatory bodies and standards as a feature of its operating environment, for example for businesses in the financial services, health care or energy industries. Beardsley et al., for example, refer to companies who are fatalistic or confrontational in their approach to being regulated. They recommend instead that the regulatory aspects of the business environment need to be integrated into the wider aspects of strategic planning and a coordinated approach taken in dialogue with regulators.

The term "regulatory strategy" is also used by regulators and legislators to define the aims and processes through which they will undertake their regulatory functions.

=== Maturity of planning process ===
McKinsey & Company developed a capability maturity model in the 1970s to describe the sophistication of planning processes, with strategic management ranked the highest. The four stages include:

1. Financial planning, which is primarily about annual budgets and a functional focus, with limited regard for the environment;
2. Forecast-based planning, which includes multi-year budgets and more robust capital allocation across business units;
3. Externally oriented planning, where a thorough situation analysis and competitive assessment is performed;
4. Strategic management, where widespread strategic thinking occurs and a well-defined strategic framework is used.

=== PIMS study ===
The long-term PIMS study, started in the 1960s and lasting for 19 years, attempted to understand the Profit Impact of Marketing Strategies (PIMS), particularly the effect of market share. The initial conclusion of the study was unambiguous: the greater a company's market share, the greater their rate of profit. Market share provides economies of scale. It also provides experience curve advantages. The combined effect is increased profits.

The benefits of high market share naturally led to an interest in growth strategies. The relative advantages of horizontal integration, vertical integration, diversification, franchises, mergers and acquisitions, joint ventures and organic growth were discussed. Other research indicated that a low market share strategy could still be very profitable. Schumacher (1973), Woo and Cooper (1982), Levenson (1984), and later Traverso (2002) showed how smaller niche players obtained very high returns.

== Other influences on business strategy ==
=== Military strategy ===
In the 1980s business strategists realized that there was a vast knowledge base stretching back thousands of years that they had barely examined. They turned to military strategy for guidance. Military strategy books such as The Art of War by Sun Tzu, On War by von Clausewitz, and The Red Book by Mao Zedong became business classics. From Sun Tzu, they learned the tactical side of military strategy and specific tactical prescriptions. From von Clausewitz, they learned the dynamic and unpredictable nature of military action. From Mao, they learned the principles of guerrilla warfare. Important marketing warfare books include Business War Games by Barrie James, Marketing Warfare by Al Ries and Jack Trout and Leadership Secrets of Attila the Hun by Wess Roberts. The marketing warfare literature also examined leadership and motivation, intelligence gathering, types of marketing weapons, logistics and communications.

By the twenty-first century marketing warfare strategies had gone out of favour in favor of non-confrontational approaches. In 1989, Dudley Lynch and Paul L. Kordis published Strategy of the Dolphin: Scoring a Win in a Chaotic World. "The Strategy of the Dolphin" was developed to give guidance as to when to use aggressive strategies and when to use passive strategies. A variety of aggressive strategies were developed.

In 1993, J. Moore used a similar metaphor. Instead of using military terms, he created an ecological theory of predators and prey(see ecological model of competition), a sort of Darwinian management strategy in which market interactions mimic long term ecological stability.

Author Phillip Evans said in 2014 that "Henderson's central idea was what you might call the Napoleonic idea of concentrating mass against weakness, of overwhelming the enemy. What Henderson recognized was that, in the business world, there are many phenomena which are characterized by what economists would call increasing returns—scale, experience. The more you do of something, disproportionately the better you get. And therefore he found a logic for investing in such kinds of overwhelming mass in order to achieve competitive advantage. And that was the first introduction of essentially a military concept of strategy into the business world. ... It was on those two ideas, Henderson's idea of increasing returns to scale and experience, and Porter's idea of the value chain, encompassing heterogenous elements, that the whole edifice of business strategy was subsequently erected."

== Traits of successful companies ==
Like Peters and Waterman a decade earlier, James Collins and Jerry Porras spent years conducting empirical research on what makes great companies. Six years of research uncovered a key underlying principle behind the 19 successful companies that they studied: They all encourage and preserve a core ideology that nurtures the company. Even though strategy and tactics change daily, the companies, nevertheless, were able to maintain a core set of values. These core values encourage employees to build an organization that lasts. In Built To Last (1994) they claim that short term profit goals, cost cutting, and restructuring will not stimulate dedicated employees to build a great company that will endure. In 2000 Collins coined the term "built to flip" to describe the prevailing business attitudes in Silicon Valley. It describes a business culture where technological change inhibits a long term focus. He also popularized the concept of the BHAG (Big Hairy Audacious Goal).

Arie de Geus (1997) undertook a similar study and obtained similar results. He identified four key traits of companies that had prospered for 50 years or more. They are:

- Sensitivity to the business environment – the ability to learn and adjust
- Cohesion and identity – the ability to build a community with personality, vision, and purpose
- Tolerance and decentralization – the ability to build relationships
- Conservative financing

A company with these key characteristics he called a living company because it is able to perpetuate itself. If a company emphasizes knowledge rather than finance, and sees itself as an ongoing community of human beings, it has the potential to become great and endure for decades. Such an organization is an organic entity capable of learning (he called it a "learning organization") and capable of creating its own processes, goals, and persona.

Will Mulcaster suggests that firms engage in a dialogue that centres around these questions:

- Will the proposed competitive advantage create Perceived Differential Value?"
- Will the proposed competitive advantage create something that is different from the competition?"
- Will the difference add value in the eyes of potential customers?" – This question will entail a discussion of the combined effects of price, product features and consumer perceptions.
- Will the product add value for the firm?" – Answering this question will require an examination of cost effectiveness and the pricing strategy.

== See also ==
- Balanced scorecard
- Business analysis
- Business model
- Business plan
- Cost overrun
- Dynamic capabilities
- Enterprise risk management
- Financial risk management § Corporate finance
- Goal ambiguity
- Integrated business planning
- Marketing
- Marketing plan
- Marketing strategies
- Management
- Management consulting
- Military strategy
- Morphological analysis
- Overall equipment effectiveness
- Outline of management
- Real options valuation
- Results-based management
- Revenue shortfall
- Six Forces Model
- Strategy (game theory)
- Strategy dynamics
- Strategic planning
- Strategic Management Society
- Strategy map
- Strategy Markup Language
- Strategy visualization
- Value migration
