= Steve Rivkin =

American marketing theorist (1947–2016)

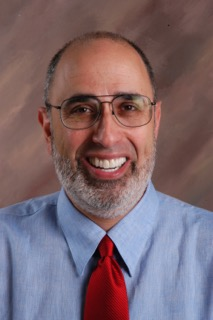
- Born: January 13, 1947. Freeport, New York
- Died: November 16, 2016 (aged 69)
- Occupations: Marketing & Communications Consultant, Author

Steve Rivkin (January 13, 1947 – November 16, 2016) was an American marketing and communications consultant, author, and speaker. He founded Rivkin & Associates LLC in 1989.

== Biography ==
The son of a pharmacist, Rivkin came from a medical family that included a general practitioner, a thoracic surgeon, an ob-gyn, a radiologist, and an infertility specialist. He advised healthcare organizations and more than 100 community hospitals on marketing and public affairs issues, and worked with a partner Fraser P. Seitel, author of The Practice of Public Relations.

In 2006, Rivkin was appointed Senior Fellow in Health Communications and Marketing Strategy at the Estes Park Institute, a national healthcare educational organization. He served on the boards of directors of the Estes Park Institute and Volunteers in Medicine. In 2015, he was named CEO of the Estes Park Institute.

Rivkin also specialized in corporate and brand naming. His firm created new names for companies and brands. His 2004 book, The Making of a Name, which he co-authored, was described by Library Journal as "an authoritative and fascinating book on names and naming that will be used by entrepreneurs, students, inventors, marketers, and wordsmiths at all levels."

Prior to forming his own firm, Rivkin spent 14 years working with Jack Trout and Al Ries at Trout & Ries Inc., a marketing strategy firm known for its work in positioning He left Trout & Ries as executive vice president.

Rivkin was a frequent speaker on marketing and communications topics, at company seminars, industry conferences, and a contributor to business and trade publications.

== Bibliography ==
Rivkin is the co-author of six books on business and marketing strategy.

- Differentiate or Die, by Jack Trout and Steve Rivkin, 2nd edition, 2008, John Wiley & Sons.
- The Making of a Name, by Steve Rivkin and Fraser Sutherland, Oxford University Press, 2004.
- IdeaWise, by Steve Rivkin and Fraser Seitel, John Wiley & Sons, 2002.
- The Power of Simplicity, by Jack Trout and Steve Rivkin, McGraw-Hill, 1998.
- The New Positioning, by Jack Trout and Steve Rivkin, McGraw-Hill, 1996.
- Repositioning: Marketing in an Era of Competition, Change and Crisis, by Jack Trout and Steve Rivkin, McGraw-Hill, 2010.
