= Trout & Ries =

Advertising team

Trout & Ries was known for publicizing and then putting into practice the concepts in their ''Positioning. The Battle For Your Mind book.

== History ==
Advertising Age wrote that "Jack Trout and Al Ries didn't invent positioning. But they positioned it." Both of them had been employed in General Electric's advertising department. Their partnership originated when, in 1967, Trout joined the firm that in 1961 Ries had founded as Ries Cappiello Colwell. In 1989 they renamed their firm Trout & Ries. In 1994 they used the term "refocusing" as a counterweight to a then-popular buzzword: reengineering. That was also the year when their formal partnership ended: Trout opened Trout & Partners in Connecticut, and Ries began Ries & Ries with his daughter Laura Ries in Atlanta.
