= Riesz =

Riesz may refer to:

- Frigyes Riesz (1880–1956), Hungarian mathematician
- Helene Scheu-Riesz (1880–1970), Austrian women's rights activist, writer and publisher
- Marcel Riesz (1886–1969), Hungarian and Swedish mathematician, younger brother of Frigyes Riesz

== See also ==
- Riesz, the fictional Amazon warrior and princess of Rolante— one of the six playable characters in the video game Seiken Densetsu 3
- Mademoiselle Reisz, a character in Kate Chopin's novel The Awakening

Related surnames

- Riess, German surname
- Reisz, surname
- Ries (disambiguation), derived from the Arabic word rizma
