= Reisz =

Reisz may refer to:

- Albie Reisz (1917–1985), American professional football quarterback
- Aron Reisz (born 1995), Romanian and Hungarian professional ice hockey player
- Gábor Reisz (born 1980), Hungarian film director
- Karel Reisz (1926–2002), Czech-born British filmmaker
- Kristopher Reisz (born 1979), American author
- Robert R. Reisz, Canadian paleontologist
- R.W. Reisz, American Futurist and Author
- Tiffany Reisz, American author
- Mademoiselle Reisz, a main character in The Awakening, an 1899 novel by Kate Chopin

== See also ==
Related surnames

- Riess, German surname
- Riesz, surname
- Ries (disambiguation), derived from the Arabic word rizma
