= Customer migration =

Concept in marketing

In marketing, customer migration refers to the shifting of customers from one segment to the other. A Customer Segment or a group of individuals is formed that allows the company to identify and reach out to customers (current or potential) with similar needs and expectations from the product or service. This movement can be a result of any event or actions led by the company or the customer themself.

The first can be a resultant of marketing campaigns, messages and targeting, while the second can occur if there is change in customer preferences, income, or as a response to the marketing campaign that may or may not have touched the target audience.

In the fast-moving marketing space, one of the best ways to understand customer behavior is by analyzing the customer migration pattern. This phenomenon has prevailed over a long period of time, along with some steady buyers, there are customer who are always in motion.

== Reason to Study the Patterns ==
There are several migration patterns, it can a movement up the value chain such as from economy class to business and to first class. Also, with an initial purchase of a single product and later turning into a buyer of several different products. Learning and examination of the migration patterns can serve many tasks of the company, like customer loyalty and retention, brand loyalty, revenue and sales maximization and even the analysis of return on investment. These patterns help evaluating different segments and the way to contact them effectively. With the promotion done to these segments on the basis of their shared characteristics, it is more likely for a product to showcase greater success rate.

== Measuring the Customer Migration ==
To measure and analyze the migration patterns, a number of approaches can be followed. It can start either by deciding segments and dividing the population in those buckets according to their behavior patterns at the beginning and end of the period to measure the displacement. Example categories such as: Loyalists, Under performs, Seasonal, Onetime and two-time buyers and Inactive buyers. Another approach is to form a group of people with shared interests and purchase patterns as one segment, and later analyze their movements and migration after the end of the period.

== See also ==
- Customer analytics
- Customer retention
- Value migration
