= Civic marketing =

Civic marketing is a type of image marketing where a business provides support or service within their community, and then the business potentially benefits from the favorable publicity that follows. The support and volunteer efforts are intended to generate publicity and create an unselfish, less commercial, more caring image for their brand.

== Brand Objective ==
With civic marketing, the brand objective is to enhance the image of the brand by showing that the people involved with the brand care about the needs of their communities, and are willing to give of their time to help. Civic marketing can humanize a brand, distinguish a business, enhance credibility, and provide powerful fuel for press releases.

Civic marketing differs from cause marketing primarily in the brand objective. With cause-related marketing, the objective is to align the brand with a specific cause or non-profit organization. The good deed is often a type of fundraising, where a monetary contribution to the cause is tied to a purchase. With civic marketing, the efforts usually do not involve fundraising and are not necessarily provided to a non-profit organization.

At a time when cause-related marketing has become over-commercialized, civic marketing offers a credible way for a brand to send a "we care about people" message. Civic marketing has the potential to build brand loyalty in a way that no other form of marketing can. A "hands on" effort is less likely to become over-commercialized, because it involves a significant commitment of time and energy that demonstrates the sincerity of those involved.

== Planning a Campaign ==
Planning a civic marketing campaign often begins with selecting an appropriately targeted volunteer project that will serve the strategic objective, motivate employees to participate voluntarily, and touch the hearts of the target market when they hear about the effort. Relating the product or service that the business provides to the project can make it more meaningful and motivating. The tie-in should be clear. A building materials manufacturer helping with a Habitat for Humanity project, or the employees of a restaurant helping out in a soup kitchen, are examples of good tie-ins.
