= Marketing warfare strategies =

Marketing warfare strategies represent a type of strategy, used in commerce and marketing, that tries to draw parallels between business and warfare and then applies the principles of military strategy to business situations, with competing firms considered as analogous to sides in a military conflict, and market share considered as analogous to territory in dispute. This view of marketing argues that in mature, low-growth markets, where real GDP growth is negative or low, commerce operates as a zero-sum game. One participant's gain is possible only at another participant's expense. Success depends on battling competitors for market share.

== The use of marketing warfare strategies ==
Strategy is the organized deployment of resources to achieve specific objectives, something that business and warfare have in common. During the 1980s, business strategists recognized a vast body of knowledge spanning millennia that remained largely unexplored. They turned to military strategy for guidance. Military strategy books like The Art of War by Sun Tzu, On War by von Clausewitz, and The Little Red Book by Mao Zedong became business classics.

From Sun Tzu they learned the tactical side of military strategy and specific tactical proscriptions. In regard to what business strategists call "first-mover advantage", Sun Tzu said: "Generally, he who occupies the field of battle first and awaits an enemy is at ease, he who comes later to the scene and rushes into the fight is weary." From Von Clausewitz they learned the dynamic and unpredictable nature of military strategy. Clausewitz felt that in a situation of chaos and confusion, strategy should be based on flexible principles. Strategy comes not from formulas or rules of engagement, but from adapting to what he called "friction" (minute-by-minute events). From Mao Zedong they learned the principles of guerrilla warfare.

The first major proponents of marketing warfare theories were Philip Kotler and J.B. Quinn. In an early description of business military strategy, Quinn claims that an effective strategy: "first probes and withdraws to determine opponents' strengths, forces opponents to stretch their commitments, then concentrates resources, attacks a clear exposure, overwhelms a selected market segment, builds a bridgehead in that market, and then regroups and expands from that base to dominate a wider field."

The main marketing warfare books were

- Business War Games by Barrie James, 1985
- Marketing Warfare by Al Ries and Jack Trout, 1986
- Leadership Secrets of Attila the Hun by Wess Roberts, 1987

By the turn of the century, marketing warfare strategies had gone out of fashion. It was felt that they were limiting. There were many situations in which non-confrontational approaches were more appropriate. The Strategy of the Dolphin was developed in the mid-1990s to give guidance as to when to use aggressive strategies and when to use passive strategies. Today, most business strategists stress that considerable synergies and competitive advantages can be gained from collaboration, partnering, and co-operation. They stress how to divide up the market and how to grow the market. Such are the vicissitudes of business theories. Finally, a recent contribution to understanding and using marketing warfare strategies is the visual business war game proposed by S. Goria.

== Marketing warfare strategies ==
- Offensive marketing warfare strategies - They are used to secure competitive advantages; market leaders, runners-up or struggling competitors are usually attacked.
- Defensive marketing warfare strategies - They are used to defend competitive advantages; lessen risk of being attacked, decrease effects of attacks, strengthen position.
- Flanking marketing warfare strategies - They operate in areas of little importance to the competitor.
- Guerrilla marketing warfare strategies - Attack, retreat, hide, then do it again, and again, until the competitor moves on to other markets.
- Position defense - This is a strategy which utilizes its current position against the attacking opposition. In a business context, this is a strategy usually applied when a company has a dominant stake in the market place, usually a monopolized and controlled industry. Marketing with this type of strategy can be identified through barriers of entry. This is where a company has fortified its position by having key strongholds in the Marketing segment or brand identity or product familiarity. They may apply these areas through increasing the equity of the brand or repeat purchases other wise known as customer loyalty strategies (Shayne, Milligan. 2012). E.g. Starbucks as a café giant promoted the free wifi connection to protect their market share against the competition that had first applied the concept (Jamie, Burns. 2013).
- Mobile defense - By moving resources and creating new strategies and tactics, the intended goal is to create a moving target that is difficult to attack by the opposition. This also equips the defense to repel any attacks the opposition has in store. The interpretation in business explained by Shayne Milligan is when businesses introduce new products, replacement products, modifying existing products and repositioning products as well as changing the marketing segments, target markets or changing promotional focus. This type of defensive strategy is most likely incorporated by entrepreneurial companies with strong marketing research and marketing skills along with the ability to continuously develop their product line (Shayne Milligan. 2012).
- Flanking position - Re-deploy your resources to discourage any type of flanking attack. This in business terms is developing new products in a marketing segment that you occupy. By expanding resources the business is able to strengthen their hold on the segment under threat (Shayne Milligan. 2012). E.g. Absolut Vodka had found a marketing segment that was leased served. In doing so they were able to capture this market by increasing prices by promoting premium vodka this tackled their competition Smirnoff in a space they did not allocate resources towards. This is known as Flanking marketing compared to the strategy of flanking position this was a successful attack towards the opposition (Jamie Burns. 2013).
- Counter offense - This initially involves counterattacking the opposition that has attacked you. In business context this is where a counterattack is made on the oppositions weakest point (Shayne Milligan. 2012). Pre-emptive attack on any business must have some type of counter re-action this could be a move by the competition into its sales territory, price cutting, promotional blitz or product improvements. When faced with these competitive signs the options can be frontal deployment of resources by strategically developing new products or improving on products. The other option is finding the oppositions weakest point, which in military terms would be attacking the competitions main territory. E.g. Central DuPage, a suburban hospital located in Chicago, had been under invasion by competitors. Primary and urgent care centres had moved into the local suburban area and with the population rising it became and opportunity not just for the Central hospital DuPage but also for their competitors. In order for the local hospital to protect its share in the market it had to develop new physician offices located in under served areas. This was a counter offence by re-positioning themselves they were able to take in patients through their newly allocated offices where the physicians could refer their patients to the Central DuPage hospital (Naresh, K Malhotra. 1988).
- Frontal attack - This strategy is specifically designed to engage the opposition with a head-on frontal assault. This also means using a substantial amount of resources and financial commitment when taking on a competitor with this strategy. From marketing to the production process, all elements are activated when initiating such an abrasive move. Advertising campaigns and new products are usually intensified to take on the competition where they are strongest; this is to weaken their market share and margins by cutting off their leading products and influencing their targeted audience to re-evaluate their loyalty to the brand or product. It is rare to encounter such strategies, as the process is quite expensive and time-consuming; this is also a high-risk venture if the competition has a strong counteroffensive attack, which can leave the attacking opponent open to counterstrikes. With resources already stretched this strategy is not for the faint-hearted. Shayne Milligan explains that this type of strategy is only used when the market space is homogenous, brand equity is low, customer loyalty is low, products are poorly differentiated, the competitor has relatively low resources or the attacker has stronger resources (Shayne Milligan. 2013). E.g. In 2011 the US shopping giant Target had entered the Canadian market with financial investments exceeding 4.4 billion dollars. Part of this initial investment was allocated towards purchasing 220 previously acquired stores of Zellers, a local Canadian merchandising mogul. With almost 10 million being spent on the refurbishing of each store as well as the hiring of 150–200 employees per store, the financial forecast for the Target Corporation was estimated to be around 6 billion per year by the year of 2017. This was not to be the case, as Target's initiating year in the Canadian retail market failed to achieve any realistic financial goals. Even though the success of Target's US stores were still in effect, the underestimated planning into the Canadian market was due to unforeseen economic variables as well as Canadian loyalty to stores also owned by US parent companies Wal-Mart and Costco, etc. Such competition had put the Target Corporation in a position at risk of making more losses than profits, which would also effect their US-based stores. Taking on Wal-Mart and other foreign and domestic competition has been unsuccessful, but Target continues to move towards dominating some part of the Canadian retail market (2015).
- Envelopment strategy or encirclement strategy - This strategy is more broadly used as it focuses on subtle offensive attacks. In such cases the introduction of products that are similar to the competitor's products are developed to liberate the market share of the opposition's product line. When done properly this type of strategy can avoid a full-scale frontal assault. The objective is to find niches in the marketing space rather than the creating of products that directly compete against the competition. It is more of an indirect assault on the oppositions market share. Shayne Milligan suggests this strategy be used when the market is loosely segmented, some segments are free of larger competitors, the attacker has strong product development resources, the attacker has enough resources to operate in multiple segments simultaneously and the attacker has a decentralized organizational structure (Shayne Milligan. 2013). E.g. Republic Health Corporation, which is a chain of health care centers located in Dallas, developed an advertising campaign called “Step Lively”. This was specifically incorporated to focus on pricing, product form, sales promotion and advertising. The strategy was to create incentives through discounted foot examinations and free home meals after hospitalization as well as purchasing gift cards for a new shoe's. They focused on one area at a time against competitors while funneling specific treatments for patients into one hospital in each area at a time (Naresh K, Malhotra. 1988).
- Leapfrog strategy - Bypassing is a less indirect strategy compared to the alternative options. In business terms this can be achieved through technological advancements or creating new segments that have not been developed as of yet (Naresh K, Malhotra. 1988).
- Guerilla - Guerrilla strategies used usually consists of small incremental attacks by using unconventional methods against a larger opposition. In a business context this can most commonly be used by smaller firms on the bigger competition. These are tactically made forms of communications between the consumers influence of the bigger competitors specifically targeting a market segment that is heavily influenced by the competing opposition. They may be short burst attacks through price cuts, supply deterrence, executive raids or a promotional blitz, even legal actions against the competition or negative publicity. But this type of strategy must have some type of disengage tactic, as a full on confrontational assault could be disastrous for a small firm (Naresh K, Malhotra. 1988). E.g. In 2005 a telecommunications company based in Romania had launched itself in already emerging market of mobile phones. They did this by acquiring an already unsuccessful firm but re-branding the company and using the already established networks. Two rival competitors at that time had complete control of the telecommunications sector in Romania. In order for the smaller firm to compete, they had to resort to two marketing warfare tactics: flanking attacks as well as guerrilla strategies. They were able to penetrate two segments, pre-pay and post-pay. By not taking the competition head on through more heavily operated segments of the industry at that time, they were able to find an area that was less productive for the larger telecommunication providers. The small firm was able to increase 95% of their coverage to 82% of their networks distribution area making mobile phone more affordable and assessable to their customer base initially targeting a young audience. This was unexpected by the two larger telecommunications providers even though they still controlled a larger portion of the telecom industry the small firm was able to become a medium-sized competitor within a short period of time (B, G, Cernat. G, L, Constantin. A, Chiciudean. 2008).

Companies typically use many strategies concurrently, some defensive, some offensive, and always some deterrent. According to the business literature of the period, offensive strategies were more important than defensive one. Defensive strategies were used when needed, but an offensive strategy was requisite. Only by offensive strategies, were market gains made. DAt best, defensive strategies could save you from falling too far behind.

The marketing warfare literature also examined leadership and motivation, intelligence gathering, types of marketing weapons, logistics, and communications.

== See also ==
- marketing
- strategic management
- marketing strategies
- strategic planning
- guerrilla marketing warfare strategies
- Lanchester's laws and business
- Business war games
- Megamarketing
