= The Elements of Influence =

2006 book by Alan Kelly

The Elements of Influence: The New Essential System for Managing Competition, Reputation, Brand, and Buzz
- Paperback Edition Cover
- Author: Alan D. Kelly
- Language: English
- Genre: Non-fiction
- Publisher: Dutton (hardcover) Plume (paperback)
- Publication date: 2006 (hardcover) 2007 (paperback)
- Publication place: United States
- Media type: Book
- Pages: 352
- ISBN: 0452288738

The Elements of Influence: The New Essential System for Managing Competition, Reputation, Brand, And Buzz, or simply The Elements of Influence (Dutton, 2006), is a book written by Alan D. Kelly that explains the first complete ontology of influence, known as The Standard Influence Decision System, sometimes referred to as "The Playmaker's Standard." In its review of the book, The Wall Street Journal lauded Kelly for "making us look at the time-worn faces of the business world in a fresh and freshly ordered way." The book's publication led to the formation of a consultancy, called Playmaker Systems, LLC, and a series of self-service and for-pay web-tools and apps that further explicate the decision support system.

== Overview ==
In the text, Kelly breaks down the most basic units of influence, called influence stratagems – colloquially referred to as "plays" – which practitioners of influence employ for mutual and competitive advantage. According to Kelly, plays underlie all aspects of the influence industries – examples being marketing, public affairs, public relations, information warfare, IO/MISO, psy ops, law, diplomacy, politics, sales, positioning, and rhetorical debate – and are employed regardless of skill-set and discipline.

The Elements of Influence presents the Standard Table of Influence, a classification of the units of influence into an ontology. The Standard Table of Influence consists of 25 irreducibly unique influence stratagems (since revised down to 24, see below), organized by a three-class and eight-subclass superstructure. The table's concise organization into a stable decision-support system for influence has led some practitioners to refer to it as "the Rosetta Stone of influence."

In addition to the Standard Table of Influence, The Elements of Influence details various other supporting tools and resources for the understanding and application of influence, including the Standard Cycle of Influence, Standard Factors of Influence, the concepts of Alpha and Beta plays, the concept of Fit and Friction, play type pairs, play harmonics and play type clusters.

== Book ==
=== Origins ===
The Elements of Influence was written by Alan D. Kelly, who started, ran and sold Applied Communications, a Silicon Valley tech, PR and communications research firm from 1992 to 2003.

To put a precise date on the text's genesis would be September 5, 1995. At a Paris technology conference, Oracle CEO Larry Ellison, an Applied Communications' client, declared in a keynote address directly preceding his rival Bill Gates, then Chairman and CEO of Microsoft, that "the PC is a ridiculous device." It was from this that Kelly derived one of the first plays, the Call Out."

=== Contents ===
In The Elements of Influence, Kelly makes a case for the development of influence strategy as an applied discipline in the Preface, Introduction and in Section I, titled "The Basics of Playmaking." He then orders each chapter sequentially in Section II, "The Playmaker's Table," to explain each of the system's influence plays. In Section III, titled "Methods and Variables of Playmaking," Kelly lays out supporting principles of influence strategy. Lastly, in Section IV, the author closes with anecdotal stories of the making of The Playmaker's Standard, a Conclusion, Acknowledgements, an Appendix of Play Action Maps, Notes, a Glossary, an Index of Figures and Tables, and a general Index.

Once ordered, Kelly moved beyond classification and into the system's ontological structure. In Section II, titled "The Playmaker's Table," the author provides details pertaining to each influence play. Now called "Standard Guidance," these details consist of the Class and Subclass to which the play belongs; Upsides and Downsides of employing the play; Related Terms to the play, especially those which are colloquial and/or found in common literature; Related Plays; Examples of the play being deployed in business, politics, popular culture and in a military context; Best Practices for Decoding the play if it's being employed against you; Best Practices for employing the play on your own behalf; and plays by which one can reliably Counter the play if it's been deployed against a focal player.

=== Use and Application ===
The Elements of Influence has been used as the principal or as a supporting text in numerous undergraduate and graduate courses at The Graduate School of Political Management at The George Washington University and Lipscomb University. Kelly himself uses the book to teach political management graduate courses at the George Washington University entitled "The Elements of Influence".

== Version 2.0 ==
On September 17, 2012, Kelly released a white paper detailing the changes to the system after five years of use in the marketplace. The most notable difference between the first and second versions is the reduction of the table from 25 to 24 influence plays and from eight to seven subclasses, emphasized by a visual redesign.

== Other media ==
An iOS app based on the Standard Table of Influence was released on September 5, 2012. It is based on a revised release of the table, which has been reduced to 24 distinct plays, down from the book's 25. It allows users to follow a four-step process to identify plays that are being run by them, for them, with them, and against them. A premium content in-app purchase allows users to fully explore the table and each play's explanations, pros, cons, complements, counter-plays, and examples.
