= Charles Ries =

Charles Ries may refer to:

- Charles P. Ries (diplomat) (born 1951), American businessman and diplomat
- Charles P. Ries (poet) (born 1952), American poet and writer
