= Marketing Hall of Fame =

The Marketing Hall of Fame was launched by the members of the New York chapter of the American Marketing Association, the creators of the Effies and the GreenBook.

Honorees are inducted in a ceremony held in New York City every spring.

== Inductees in the Marketing Hall of Fame ==
=== 2014 ===
Beth Comstock, Senior Vice President and Chief Marketing Officer, General Electric; Dr. Philip Kotler, S.C. Johnson & Son Distinguished Professor of International Marketing, Kellogg School of Management, Northwestern University; Joseph V. Tripodi, Executive Vice President, Chief marketing & Commercial Officer, The Coca-Cola Company

=== 2015 ===
David Aaker, Vice-chairman of Prophet Brand Strategy and Professor Emeritus of Marketing Strategy at the Haas School of Business, University of California, Berkeley; Yvon Chouinard, Founder of Patagonia; Trevor Edwards, President, Nike Brand, Nike, Inc.; Shelly Lazarus, Chairman Emeritus, Ogilvy & Mather

=== 2016 ===
Al Ries, Marketing Strategist and Author; Bob Greenberg, Founder, Chairman/CEO; John Hayes, Former Chief Marketing Officer, American Express

=== 2017 ===
Seth Godin, Author, teacher, entrepreneur; Lee Clow, Creative Director, TBWA Chiat Day; Esther Lee, Chief Marketing Officer, MetLife.
