= Structure follows Strategy =

Strategic management aspect

Structure follows Strategy is a strategic management aspect which indicates a narrative that the organizational structure of a company should be well and truly designed in a way to support its strategy in order to reap rewards in the foreseeable future. In simple terms, the role of the structure is to deliver the strategy. The concept of Structure follows strategy was coined theoretically by A.D. Chandler and Henry Mintzberg in 1962. The all aspects of an organization’s structure from the establishment of departments and divisions to the designation and reporting relationships should be made while also keeping up the organization’s strategic intent with the combination of both vision and mission in mind. If the structure of an organization is not tailor made in line with the strategy, then it will be a recipe for disaster for the organization as all the efforts and progress would go in vain. Chandler also pinpointed the pathway regarding the need to reorganize or to restructure an organization itself in order to adapt to volatile dynamic business changes which is in fact triggered by a strategic drift driven by brand new versions of technological changes and market changes.

== Background ==
Alfred Chandler recognized the importance of coordinating management activity under an all-encompassing strategy. Interactions between functions were typically handled by managers who relayed information back and forth between departments. Chandler stressed the importance of taking a long-term perspective when looking to the future. In his 1962 ground breaking work Strategy and Structure, Chandler showed that a long-term coordinated strategy was necessary to give a company structure, direction and focus.

== Drawbacks ==
At present, structure follows strategy; the concept is being downplayed by scholars due to the change in trends in the modern era. In the current day and age, due to the ever-evolving digital technological landscape and ever-changing dynamics in the business environment, strategies are often revised and revisited from time to time by top management of every company. It is a no-brainer to understand that the obsolescence of information due to the fast-paced real-world situations does make the structure follows strategy principle to be invalid and outdated. It is obvious that an organization should have the structure to align with its intended strategic action plan, but with the change of plans over time due to various circumstances, it would make a company find it extremely hard to amend its structure from time to time as it would be time-consuming and expensive. The appointment of a new person as a chief executive officer is a strategy, but the appointed person as a CEO, would not make an instant decision to change the structure according to his wish as changing of a structure itself would be complicated as it would cause disruptions to a company's fortunes in terms of how it would want to carry its business operations on a daily basis.

== Walmart ==
A prime example of the principle “structure follows strategy” is Walmart, recognized as the world’s largest company by revenue and workforce. Walmart’s hallmark is its focus on cost leadership, evident in its operations despite not manufacturing any products or services. From its inception, Walmart has consistently reinforced its low-pricing strategy, aligning its company structure and business model to support this approach. As per the founder of Walmart, Sam Walton’s quote “Control your expenses better than your competition. This is where you will always find a competitive advantage”, it can be revealed that the company has lived up to his ethos and vision in giving an extraordinary customer service with the utmost priority on maintaining low-cost strategy and its emphasis on provision of high-quality goods at affordable price levels to customers. The company utilizes Every Day Low Prices also known as EDLP model as its pricing strategy ever since its foundation. Walmart having the mindset and intent of maintaining low price strategy was able to establish a corporate structure which can acclimatize to such strategy. Walmart has a hierarchical functional organization structure, which is the pillar of the company going from strength to strength to exploit their competitive advantage in the industry in which it is operating. The hierarchy feature adheres to the vertical lines of command and authority throughout the company’s organizational structure. Walmart is an organization where every employee in each level reports to a direct superior except for the company CEO. The top-level management gives instructions to the middle managers on implementing required strategies and there is a formal hierarchy with middle managers need to seek approval with matters pertaining to certain business activities where the middle level managers cannot make certain decisions on their own and subsequently as a result, the middle level management has to get recommendations and prior approvals through formal email exchanges to sort things and in order to proceed with such activities. Hence it is proven that Walmart having a hierarchical structure in place gives top level management a greater control over the organizational activities and it helps to better monitor the work processes. Although these approval procedures might be time consuming and complicated, these hierarchical procedures would eventually help the organization to determine on what and how much efforts should be put in place to go ahead with certain business activities and what kind of business activities should not happen in order to live up to the company’s objectives on maintaining low-cost strategy. If the organization cannot curtail the cost of production, how can it deliver the odds in terms of its ambitions on provision of products to customers at low price levels? Therefore, having such hierarchical functional structure in place in line with the company’s low-cost strategy helps to implement important critical decisions but the functional structure do pose some strategical dilemma due to the structural mismatches and the functional structure itself creates another loophole in terms of communication methods. Walmart has also confronted challenges with regards to employee grievances at times due to issues such as low wages due to the company’s intended strategy on cost leadership and low-price strategy. This is a massive dilemma as far as the progression of the company is concerned as the most important stakeholders, the employees are deprived of salary increments and other allowances and how can a company really satisfy their customers if their own employees are not satisfied with what they got.
