= Ries =

Ries is the German word for a unit of paper ream, derived from the Arabic word rizma. The term can refer to:

== Geography ==
- Nördlinger Ries, a large circular depression in western Bavaria, Germany.
- Ries (Graz), a district of the city of Graz, Austria, named after a hill range in it.

== People ==
- Adam Ries (1492–1559), German mathematician
- Al Ries, American marketing professional and author
- Charles P. Ries (diplomat) (born 1951), American businessman and diplomat
- Charles P. Ries (poet) (born 1952), American poet and writer
- Christopher Ries (1952–), American glass sculptor
- Eric Ries, American entrepreneur and author
- Ferdinand Ries (1784–1838), German composer
- Franz Ries (1846–1932), German violinist and composer
- Franz Anton Ries (1755–1846), German Musician, Hubert and Ferdinand's Father
- Frédérique Ries (1959–), Belgian politician
- Heinrich Ries (1871–1951), American economic geologist
- Henry Ries (1917–2004), American photographer
- Hubert Ries (1802–1886), German Musician, Franz's Father
- Irving G. Ries (1890–1963), American cinematographer and special effects artist
- István Ries (1885–1950), Hungarian politician
- Jane Silverstein Ries, American landscape architect
- Judit Györgyey Ries, Hungarian astronomer
- Julien Ries, Belgian cardinal
- Justin B. Ries, American marine scientist
- Laura Ries, American businesswoman and author
- Marcie Berman Ries, American foreign service officer
- Merete Ries (1938–2018), Danish publisher and editor
- Nick Ries (1982–), former Australian rules footballer
- Peter Ries, German record producer
- Riesbyfe Stridberg, fictional character often nicknamed as Ries.

== Things ==
- the Rijnland Internet Election System
