= Typology of business strategies =

Business strategies can be categorized in many ways. One popular method uses the typology put forward by American academics Raymond E. Miles and Charles C. Snow in their 1978 book, Organizational Strategy, Structure, and Process.

== Miles and Snow's typology ==
Miles and Snow identify three types of competitive strategies, those adopted by defender, analyzer and prospector types of organization, and a fourth, non-strategic type of organization, whose competitive behaviour is reactive to the perceived environmental conditions within which it operates. For convenience the reactor type of approach is often characterised as a form of competitive strategy.

=== Prospector strategy ===
This is the most aggressive of the four strategies. It typically involves active programs to expand into new markets and stimulate new opportunities. New product development is vigorously pursued and offensive marketing warfare strategies are a common way of obtaining additional market share. They respond quickly to any signs of market opportunity, and do so with little research or analysis.

A large proportion of their revenue comes from new products or new markets. They are often highly leveraged, sometimes with a substantial equity position held by venture capitalists. The risk of product failure or market rejection is high. Their market domain is constantly in flux as new opportunities arise and past product offerings atrophy.

They value being the first in an industry, thinking that their “first mover advantage” will provide them with premium pricing opportunities and high margins. Price skimming is a common way of recapturing the cost of development. They can be opportunistic in headhunting key employees, both technical and managerial. Advertising, sales promotions, and personal selling costs are a high percentage of sales.

Typically the firm will be structured with each strategic business unit having considerable autonomy. The industry that they operate in tends to be in the introduction or growth stage of its life cycle, with few competitors and evolving technology.

=== Defender strategy ===
This strategy entails a decision not to aggressively pursue markets. As a result, they tend to do none of the things prospectors do. A defender strategy entails finding, and maintaining a secure and relatively stable market. Rather than being on the cutting edge of technological innovation, product development, and market dynamics; a defender tries to insulate themselves from changes wherever possible.

In their attempt to secure this stable market they either keep prices low, keep advertising and other promotional costs low, engage in vertical integration, offer a limited range of products, or offer better quality products or customer service. They tend to be slower in making decisions and will only commit to a change after extensive research and analysis.

Their goals tend to be efficiency oriented rather than effectiveness oriented. The industry tends to be mature, with well defined technology, products, and market segments. Most sales tend to be repeat or replacement purchases. Individual strategic business units typically have moderate to low levels of autonomy.

=== Analyzer ===
The analyzer is in between the defender and prospector. They take less risk and make less mistakes than a prospector, but are less committed to stability than defenders. Most firms are analyzers. They are seldom a first mover in an industry, but are often second or third place entrants.

They tend to expand into areas close to their existing core competency. Rather than develop wholly new products.

=== Reactor ===
A reactor has no proactive strategy, often reacting to events as they occur, or alternatively they may have a defined strategy and organizational structure which are no longer appropriate for their commercial environment. Such businesses respond only when they are forced to by macro environmental pressures. This is the least effective of the four strategies. It is without direction or focus.

Miles, Snow et al. (1978) have identified three reasons why organizations become reactors:

- Top management may not have clearly articulated the organization's strategy.
- Management does not fully shape the organization's structure and processes to fit a chosen strategy.
- A tendency for management to maintain an organization's current strategy-structure relationship despite overwhelming changes in environmental conditions.

== Empirical evidence ==
The application of Miles and Snow's typology has been widely studied both theoretically and empirically since the 1980's. For example, a study by Stephen Shortell and Edward Zajac (1990) found the predictions generated by Miles and Snow's typology to be generally accurate.

== See also ==
- Marketing strategies
- Marketing warfare strategies
- Strategic planning
- Strategic management
- Porter generic strategies
