= Arie de Geus =

Dutch business executive and theorist (1930–2019)

Arie de Geus (11 August 1930 – 9 November 2019) was a Dutch business executive, business theorist and scenario planner, who was the head of Royal Dutch Shell's Strategic Planning Group and was a public speaker.

== Life and work ==
De Geus was born in Rotterdam on 11 August 1930. He joined Royal Dutch/Shell in 1951 and remained there until his retirement in 1989. After he retired, de Geus was a visiting fellow of London Business School and worked with MIT's Center for Organizational Learning. He died on 9 November 2019.

== Publications ==
- "The Living Company" Nicholas Brealey, London (1997)

Articles, a selection:

- "The Living Company," Harvard Business Review, 1997; winner of the McKinsey Award
- "Companies: What Are They?" Lecture Royal Society of Arts, 1995
- "Planning as Learning" Harvard Business Review (1988)
