= Responsive evaluation =

Responsive evaluation (developed by Robert E. Stake) is an approach to measure the effectiveness of educational programs. The approach takes program activity, the program uniqueness, and the social diversity of the people into account when measuring educational and other types of programs.

The most important feature in the responsive evaluation is the responsiveness to main issues and problems, in particular those cases where people recognize at the site.

Responsive evaluation emphasizes educational problems more than objectives or hypotheses and direct and indirect observation of program participation (the pluralism of value standards held by various groups). It also emphasizes a continuous attention to audience information-needs and media for reporting.

== Preordinate evaluation ==
Preordinate evaluation has a relative contrast with responsive evaluation. It highlights:

1. A formal statement of goals
2. Standardized tests of student performance
3. Value standards held by program staff
4. A "research-journal" type of report

== Responsive design ==
The fundamental project of the responsive predispositition is Stake’s 12 Prominent Events:

a) Identify program scope

b) Overview program activities

c) Discover purposes and concerns

d) Conceptualize issues and problems

e) Identify data needs

f) Select observers, judges, and instruments (if any)

g) Observe designated antecedents, transactions, and outcomes

h) Thematize and prepare portrayals and case studies

i) Winnow, match issues to audiences

j) Format for audience use;

k) Assemble formal reports (if any)

l) Talk with clients, program staff, and audiences (Stake, 1976)

== Strengths ==
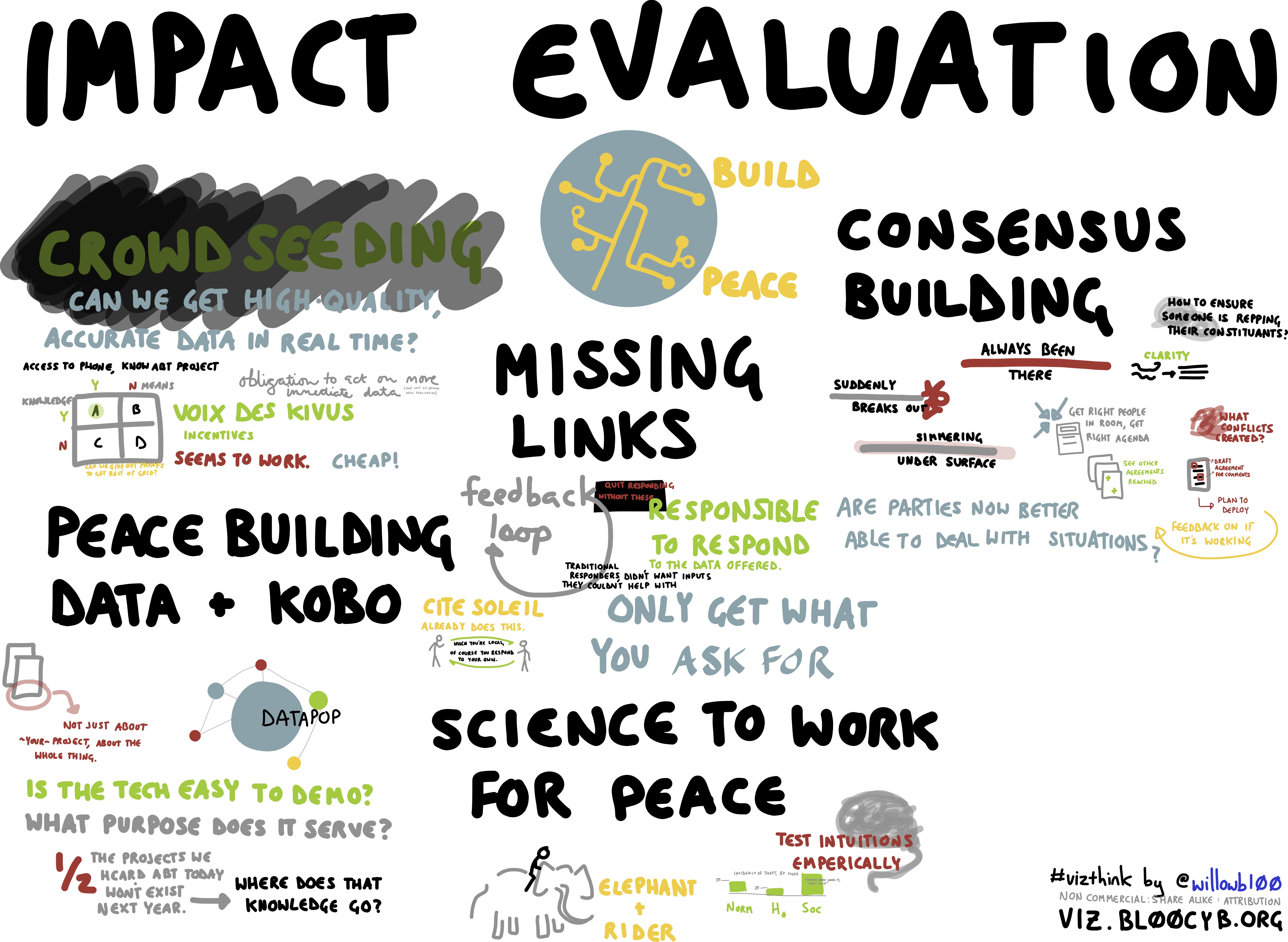
The use of policy objectives and performance indicators in policy-making and policy-oriented debates has two important benefits: it gives focus and it provides a language for policy, management and even political debates.

The responsive approach is applicable to summative and formative evaluations.

Formative evaluation is useful when the participants of the project needs help while monitoring the program; and for times it is not clear what problems are going to be faced.

In summative evaluation is useful this approach when audiences want to understand the activities, the strengths and the shortcoming of the project.

Responsive evaluation is preferred over the pre-ordinate evaluation when someone wants to know the extent to which set objectives have changed (Stake, 1972). The responsive approach let to generate large bases of data, to allow for a thick description of a program. The responsive evaluation allows for evaluations of programs which are either limited or broad in scope and is especially suited for programs which are in transition.

== Gender-responsive evaluation ==
Gender-responsive evaluation is important as a means for building strong systems for generating and using evidence in order to improve the work that people do to achieve gender equality and women's empowerment. Gender-responsive evaluation is a powerful resource for accomplish the transformative agenda of the Sustainable Development Goals.

Gender-responsive approach can improve gender equality and the empowerment of women by incorporating gender and women's rights aspects into evaluation approaches, methods, processes and use. The evaluation is a link of positive change towards gender equality and the empowerment of women. The process empowers the involved stakeholders and therefore prevents further gender discrimination and exclusion.

Effective gender-responsive programs and interventions enhance to eliminate social factors such as racism, sexism, and economic oppression which cannot be overlooked in discussions of effective interventions for women offenders. In terms of dealing with individual issues is important to take in consideration the social issues of poverty, race and gender inequalities because they have a profound impact on women lives. Successful interventions must relate to the social realities where women come from and to which they will return. Gender-responsive evaluation is sensitive to cultural differences and expectations. The first challenge is to use theories and research development that support the implementation of these critical programs.
