= Value migration =

In marketing, value migration is the shifting of value-creating forces. Value migrates from outmoded business models to business designs that are better able to satisfy customers' priorities. Marketing strategy is the art of creating value for the customer. This can only be done by offering a product or service that corresponds to customer needs. In a fast changing business environment, the factors that determine value are constantly changing.

== See also ==
- Business models
- Competitive advantage
- Core competency
- Marketing
- Strategic management
