= Riess =

Riess or Rieß is a German surname. Notable people with the surname include:

- Adam Riess (contemporary), American astrophysicist
- Erwin Riess (1957–2023), Austrian playwright
- Fritz Riess (1922–1991), German Formula One race car driver
- Jana Riess (born 1969), American writer
- Peter Riess (1804–1883), German Jewish physicist
- Lew Riess (1887–1946), American college sports coach
- Ludwig Riess (1861–1928), German-American historian and educator
- Ryan Riess (born 1990), American professional poker player and 2013 World Series of Poker Main Event champion
- Stefan Rieß (born 1988), German professional football player
- Susanne Riess-Passer (born 1961), Austrian politician

== See also ==
- Ries (disambiguation)
- Ríos (disambiguation)

Riess Family
