= Charles P. Ries (poet) =

American poet and writer (born 1952)

Charles P Ries
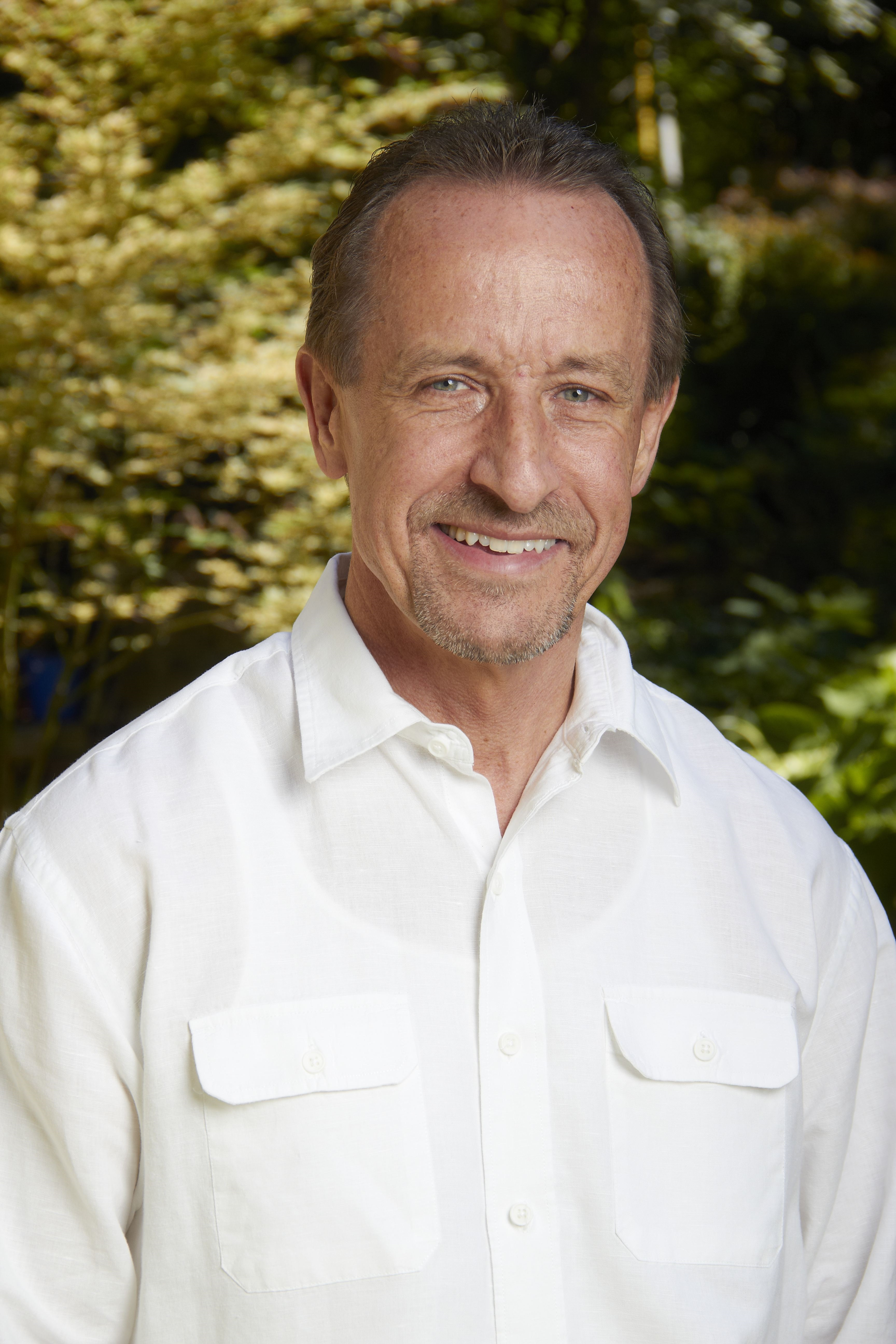
- Born: 1952 (age 73–74); Sheboygan County, Wisconsin, United States
- Writing career
- Subjects: Narrative poems, short stories, interviews, and poetry reviews
- Notable awards: Wisconsin Regional Writers Association Jade Ring Award (2009); Outstanding Achievement Award by Wisconsin Library Association (2013); Winner of Poetry Category of The Paris Book Festival (2016)

Charles P Ries (born 1952) is an American poet and writer. He is currently the Senior Director of Principal Gifts and Innovation at Marquette University. He is a founding member of the oldest freshwater surf club on the Great Lakes, the Lake Shore Surf Club. He is a co-founder of The Commons, a student entrepreneurial skills accelerator based out of Milwaukee, Wisconsin.

== Early life ==
Ries was born into a Catholic family in Sheboygan, Wisconsin. His parents were Leo and Ann Ries. He grew up on a mink farm outside of Sheboygan. Ries attended Sheboygan South High School and received his degree from the University of Wisconsin. After completing his graduation, he went to London and then to North Africa where he studied Islamic mysticism and Sufism. He also worked with the Dalai Lama during a program involving religious leaders and psychotherapists.

== Literary career ==
Ries began his literary career late in life by writing poetry and gradually began writing short stories, poetry reviews, interviews, articles and essays. He authored six poetry books and a novel based on memory. In 2013, his book titled, Girl Friend & Other Mysteries of Love was recognized as an Outstanding Achievement by Wisconsin Library Association and in 2016 it won the poetry category of The Paris Book Festival. From 1998 to 2013, his works were published in the independent small press and appeared in over two hundred print and electronic publications. In 2009, he took a hiatus and resumed his literary work later in 2013. In 2015, Ries published The Fathers We Find, a fictional memoir, based in Southeastern Wisconsin between 1950 and 1971. He is the former poetry editor for Word Riot, ESC! and Pass Port Journal. He is also a former board member of the Woodland Pattern Book Center, Milwaukee. He also served on the Wisconsin Poet Laureate Commission.

== Books ==
- The Fathers We Find: The Making of a Pleasant Humble Boy, 2015
- Girl Friend & Other Mysteries of Love, 2013
- I'd Rather Be Mexican, 2005
- The Last Time, 2005
- Odd, 2004
- Monje Malo Speaks English, 2003
- Bad Monk: Neither Here Nor There, 2001

== Awards and recognition ==
In 2009, Ries was awarded the Wisconsin Regional Writers Association “Jade Ring” Award for humorous poetry. He was nominated five times for the Pushcart Prize but never won.
