= Jack Trout =

Marketing executive

- Born: John Francis Trout; January 31, 1935; Manhattan, New York, U.S.
- Died: June 4, 2017 (aged 82); Old Greenwich, Connecticut, U.S.
- Education: Iona College
- Occupation: Advertising executive

John Francis "Jack" Trout (January 31, 1935 – June 4, 2017) was an American advertising executive and an owner of Trout & Partners, a consulting firm. He was the founder and pioneer of positioning theory and also marketing warfare theory.

== Career ==
Trout started his business career in the advertising department of General Electric. From there he went on to become a divisional advertising manager at Uniroyal. He then joined Al Ries in the advertising agency and marketing strategy firm where they worked together for over twenty-six years.

He was the founder and president of the international marketing strategy firm "Trout and Partners". The firm is represented in offices in many countries worldwide including emerging markets. Trout worked with a number of different client companies, including AT&T, Apple, Citicorp, General Electric, Hewlett-Packard, IBM, Pfizer, Procter & Gamble, Southwest Airlines, and Xerox. When working with pizza chain Papa John's, Trout was majorly involved in the invention of the chain's slogan "better ingredients, better pizza."

In the fall of 2002, Trout began working with the United States Department of State in order to "train new diplomats in the art of projecting a positive image of America overseas" as a part of the Brand America campaign, which sought to improve public opinion about the upcoming Iraq War.

Trout died of intestinal cancer at his home in Old Greenwich, Connecticut, at the age of 82.

== Family ==
He was survived by his wife Patricia, their six children and 15 grandchildren, and four siblings.

== Books ==
- Big Brands, Big Trouble: Lessons Learned the Hard Way. New York: John Wiley & Sons. 2001. ISBN 978-0471263036.
- A Genie's Wisdom: A Fable of How a CEO Learned to Be a Marketing Genius. New York: John Wiley & Sons. 2002. ISBN 978-0471236085.
- Jack Trout on Strategy. New York: McGraw-Hill Education. 2004. ISBN 978-1259589621.
- In Search of the Obvious: The Antidote for Today's Marketing Mess. New Jersey: John Wiley & Sons. 2008. ISBN 978-0470288597.

With Steve Rivkin

- The New Positioning: The Latest on the World's #1 Business Strategy. New York: McGraw-Hill Education. 1996. ISBN 978-0070653283.
- The Power of Simplicity. New York: McGraw-Hill Education. 1998. ISBN 978-0071373326.
- Differentiate or Die. New York: John Wiley & Sons. 2000. ISBN 978-0471028925.
- Repositioning: Marketing in an Era of Competition, Change, and Crisis. New York: McGraw-Hill Education. 2010. ISBN 978-0071635592.

With Al Ries

- Positioning: The Battle for Your Mind. New York: McGraw-Hill Education. 1981. ISBN 0-07-137358-6.
- Marketing Warfare. New York: McGraw-Hill Education. 1986. ISBN 9780070527300.
- Bottom-Up Marketing. New York: McGraw-Hill Education. 1989. ISBN 978-0070527331.
- Horse Sense: The Key to Success Is Finding a Horse to Ride. New York: McGraw-Hill Education. 1990. ISBN 978-0070527355.
- The 22 Immutable Laws of Marketing. New York: HarperCollins. 1993. ISBN 978-0887306662.
