= Laura Ries =

Advertising/marketing strategy consultancy co-founder, American writer

Laura Ries is an American marketing strategist and author. She is the co-founder, along with her father Al Ries, of Ries & Ries, an advertising and marketing strategy consultancy firm. She has co-authored and authored several books on branding and marketing.

== Career ==
Laura Ries is an advertising and branding consultant at Ries & Ries since 1994. Her title at Ries & Ries is president. In addition to her consulting work, Ries has appeared as a television commentator on branding and marketing topics, contributing insights to both broadcast media and print publications. In 2008, she was named to the Atlanta Business Chronicle's "40 Under 40" list, recognizing emerging business leaders.

== Books ==
Works by Laura Ries with Al Ries, published by HarperCollins:

- 22 Immutable Laws of Branding (1998) ISBN 978-0060007737
- 11 Immutable Laws of Internet Branding (2000) ISBN 978-0060196219
- The Fall of Advertising and the Rise of PR (2002) ISBN 978-0060081980
- The Origin of Brands (2004) ISBN 978-0060570156

Other works by Laura Ries:

- Visual Hammer (2015) ISBN 978-0984937066
- Battlecry (2015) ISBN 978-0984937097
