= Positioning (marketing) =

Mental perception of product or brand

In marketing, positioning is the mental perception of a product or brand by customers. Brand and product positioning methods include product differentiation, advertising, market segmentation, and business models such as the marketing mix.

The origins of the concept of positioning concept are unclear. Scholars suggest that it may have emerged from the burgeoning advertising industry in the period following World War I. The concept was popularised by advertising executives Al Ries and Jack Trout and further developed by academics Schaefer and Kuehlwein, who extended the concept to include the meaning carried by a brand. Positioning is now a regular marketing activity and forms part of overarching marketing strategy theory.

== Definition and concept ==
Among other things, David Ogilvy wrote that "the most important decision is how to position your product", and "Every advertisement is part of the long-term investment in the personality of the brand." In relation to a Dove campaign launched in 1957, Ogilvy explained, "I could have positioned Dove as a detergent bar for men with dirty hands, but chose instead to position it as a toilet bar for women with dry skin. This is still working 25 years later." In relation to a SAAB campaign launched in 1961, Ogilvy later recalled that "In Norway, the SAAB car had no measurable profile. We positioned it as a car for winter. Three years later it was voted the best car for Norwegian winters."

In the 1950s and 1960s, several large brands – including Lipton, Kraft, and Tide – developed positioning statements that guided how products would be packaged, promoted, and advertised according to consumer preferences. This early positioning tactic was focused on the product itself – its "form, package size, and price", according to advertising executives Al Ries and Jack Trout.

In an article, Industrial Marketing, published in 1969, Trout stated that the typical consumer is overwhelmed with unwanted advertising and has a natural tendency to discard all information that does not immediately find an empty slot in their mind; hence, positioning is a mental device used by consumers to simplify information inputs and store new information in a logical place. In Positioning: The Battle for Your Mind, the duo expanded the definition as "an organized system for finding a window in the mind. It is based on the concept that communication can only take place at the right time and under the right circumstances".

== Origins ==
While the precise origins of the positioning concept are unclear, Cano (2003), Schwartzkopf (2008), and others have argued that the concepts of market segmentation and positioning were central to the tacit knowledge that informed brand advertising from the 1920s, but did not become codified in marketing textbooks and journal articles until the 1950s and 60s.

Al Ries and Jack Trout are often credited with developing the concept of product or brand positioning in the late-1960s with the publication of a series of articles, followed by a book. Ries and Trout, both former advertising executives, published articles about positioning in Industrial Marketing in 1969 and Advertising Age in 1972. By the early 1970s, positioning became a popular word with marketers, especially those in advertising and promotion. In 1981, Ries and Trout published their now-classic book, Positioning: The Battle for Your Mind. However, the claim that Ries and Trout devised the concept has been challenged by marketing scholars. According to Stephen A. Fox, Ries and Trout "resurrected the concept and made it their trademark."

Some scholars credit advertising guru David Ogilvy with developing the positioning concept in the mid-1950s, at least a decade before Ries and Trout published their now-classic series of articles. Ogilvy's writings indicate that he was well aware of the concept and drilled his creative team with this idea from at least the 1950s.

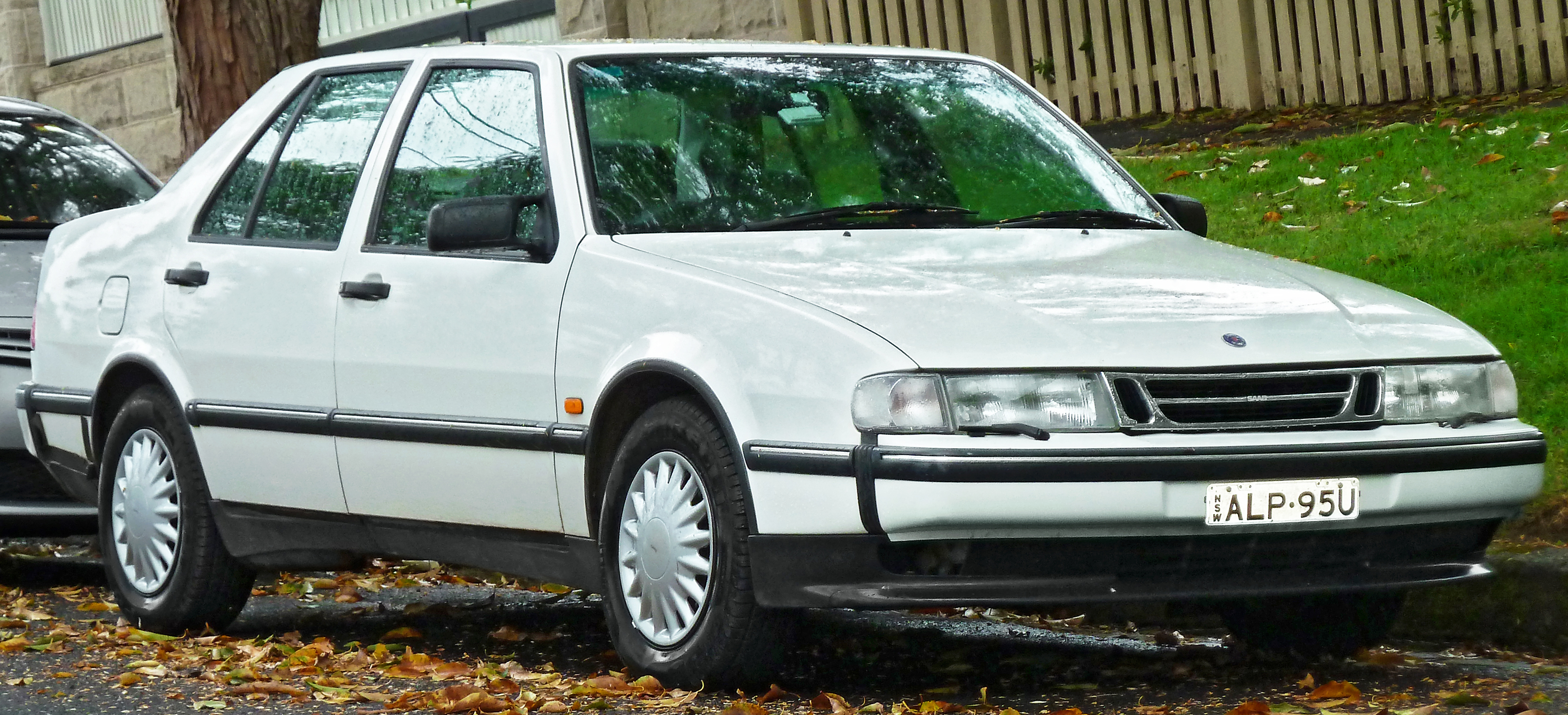
In 1961, Ogilvy positioned the Saab as the car for the European winter.

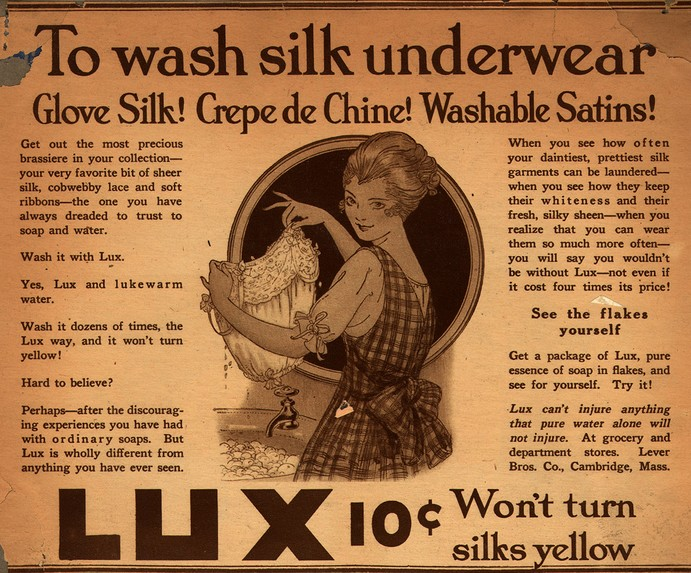
Lux, print advertisement (1916) positioning the soap as a gentle product for washing delicate clothing

Yet other scholars have suggested that the positioning concept may have much earlier heritage, attributing the concept to the work of advertising agencies in both the US and the UK in the first decades of the twentieth century. Cano, for example, has argued that marketing practitioners followed competitor-based approaches to both market segmentation and product positioning in the first decades of the twentieth century; long before these concepts were introduced into the marketing literature in the 1950s and 60s.

From around 1920, American agency, J. Walter Thompson (JWT), began to focus on developing brand personality, brand image, and brand identity—concepts that are very closely related to positioning. Across the Atlantic, the English agency, W. S. Crawford's Ltd, began to use the concept of 'product personality' and the 'advertising idea' arguing that in order to stimulate sales and create a 'buying habit' advertising had to 'build a definitive association of ideas round the goods'. For example, in 1915 JWT acquired the advertising account for Lux soap. The agency suggested that the traditional positioning as a product for woolen garments should be broadened so that consumers would see it as a soap for use on all fine fabrics in the household. To implement, Lux was repositioned with a more up-market posture and began a long association with expensive clothing and high fashion. Cano has argued that the positioning strategy JWT used for Lux exhibited an insightful understanding of the way that consumers mentally construct brand images. JWT recognized that advertising effectively manipulated socially shared symbols. In the case of Lux, the brand disconnected from images of household drudgery and connected with images of leisure and fashion.

As advertising executives in their early careers, both Ries and Trout were exposed to the positioning concept via their work. Ries and Trout codified the tacit knowledge that was available in the advertising industry, popularizing the positioning concept with the publication of their articles and books. Ries and Trout were influential in diffusing the concept of positioning from the advertising community through to the broader marketing community. Their articles were to become highly influential. By the early 1970s, positioning became a popular word with marketers, especially those that were working in the area of advertising and promotion. In 1981 Ries and Trout published their classic book, Positioning: The Battle for Your Mind (McGraw-Hill 1981). The concept enjoys ongoing currency among both advertisers and marketers as suggested by Maggard who notes that positioning provides planners with a valuable conceptual vehicle, which is effectively used to make various strategy techniques more meaningful and more productive.

The positioning concept continues to evolve. Traditionally called product positioning, the concept was limited due to its focus on the product alone. In addition to the previous focus on the product, positioning now includes building a brand's reputation and competitive standing. John P. Maggard notes that positioning provides planners with a valuable conceptual vehicle for the implementation of more meaningful and productive marketing strategies. Many branding practitioners make positioning a part of brand strategy and even label it as "brand positioning".

== Marketing strategy ==
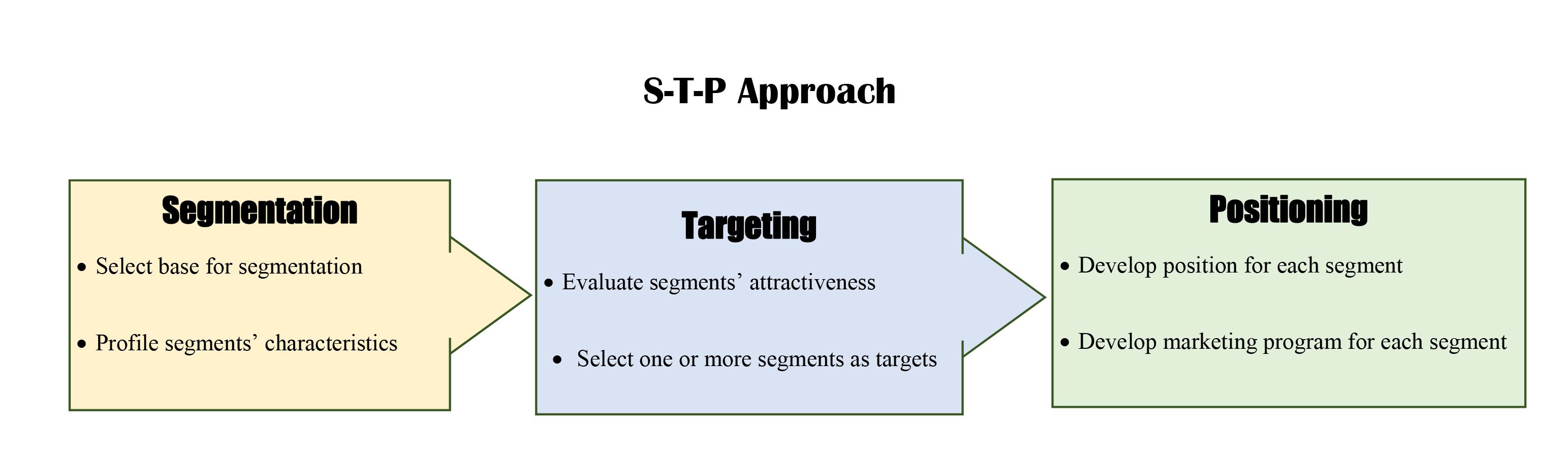
The STP approach highlights the three areas of decision-making.

Positioning is part of a broader marketing strategy which includes three basic decision levels, namely segmentation, targeting and positioning, sometimes known as the S-T-P approach:

- Segmentation: refers to the process of dividing a broad consumer or business market, normally consisting of existing and potential customers, into sub-groups of consumers (known as segments)
- Targeting: refers to the selection of a segment or segments that will become the focus of special attention, known as target markets.
- Positioning: refers to an overall strategy that "aims to make a brand occupy a distinct position, relative to competing brands, in the mind of the customer".

In general terms, there are three broad types of positioning: functional, symbolic, and experiential.

- Functional positions resolve problems, provide benefits to customers, or get favorable perception by stakeholders including lenders.
- Symbolic positions address self-image enhancement, ego identification, belongingness and social meaningfulness, and affective fulfillment.
- Experiential positions provide sensory and cognitive stimulation.

=== Positioning statement ===
The positioning statement includes an identification of the target market, the market need, the product name and category, the key benefit delivered, and the basis of the product's differentiation from any competing alternatives.

A basic template for writing positioning statements is:

- "For (target customer)
- who (statement of the need or opportunity),
- the (product name) is a (product category)
- that (statement of key benefit – that is, compelling reason to buy).
- Unlike (primary competitive alternative),
- our product (statement of primary differentiation)."

For example:

- Target customer: For upper income car buyers who currently own another brand and are looking to switch,
- Product strategy: Volvo is a differentiated brand of prestige automobiles,
- Key benefit: That offers the benefits of safety as well as prestige.
- Overall advertising strategy: The advertising for Volvo should emphasize safety and performance and must mention prestige as an entry ticket to the category, downplaying its previous family-car orientation in the interest of appealing to a broader range of users.

== Approaches ==
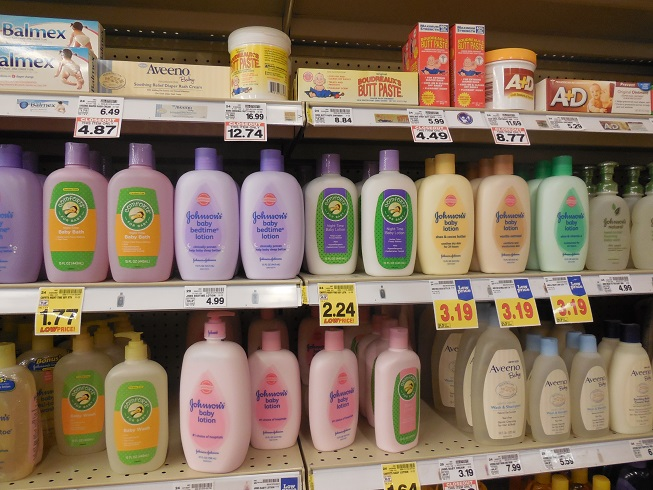
J & J Baby Bath Products are positioned against a user or segment, namely children.

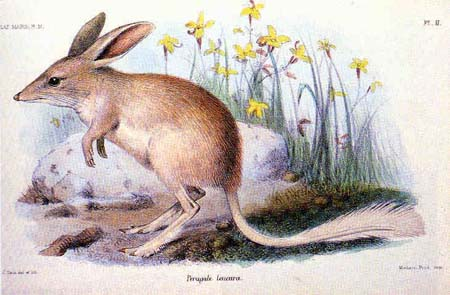
Haigh's Chocolates stopped making chocolate Easter bunnies, replacing them with Easter Bilbies as the culturally appropriate symbol of Easter in Australia.

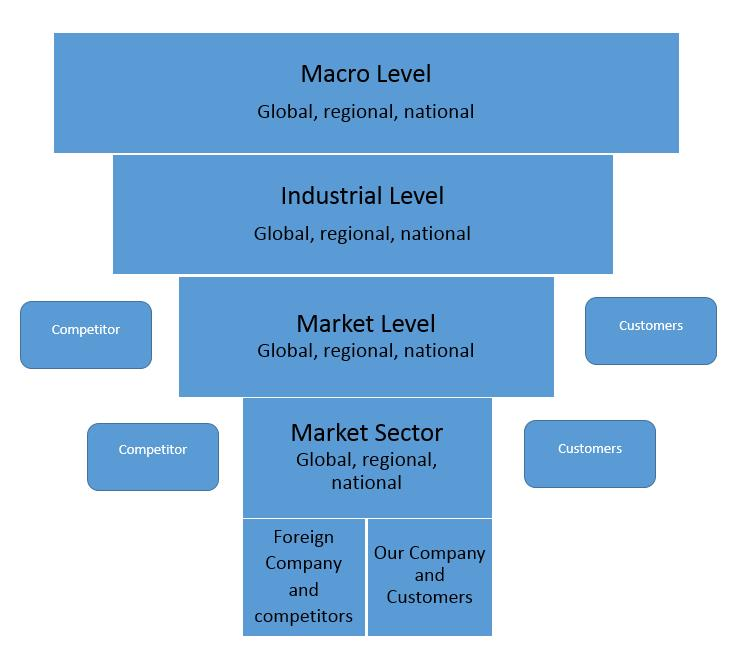
Aggregation levels in strategic analysis

To be successful in a particular market a product must occupy an "explicit, distinct and proper place in the minds of all potential and existing consumers", relative to other rival products with which the brand competes. Product positioning encompasses product visibility, recognition, identity, and placement. Effective product positioning allows for more sales and larger margins.

A national positioning strategy can often be used, or modified slightly, as a tool to accommodate entering into foreign markets.

A number of different positioning strategies have been cited in the marketing literature:

- First-mover advantage
- Pricing strategy, including marketing luxury goods and price discrimination
- Product differentiation, including:
  - Superlative positioning
  - Exclusive positioning
  - Competitive positioning
  - Categorical positioning
- Product marketing
- Seasonal marketing
- Diversity marketing

== Perceptual mapping ==
To identify suitable positions that a company or brand might occupy in a given market, analysts often turn to techniques such as perceptual mapping or correspondence analysis. Perceptual maps are diagrammatic representations of consumers' mental perceptions of the relative positions that various brands occupy within a category. Traditionally, perceptual mapping selects two variables that are relevant to consumers (often, but not necessarily, price and quality) and then asks a sample of the target market to indicate where they would place various brands in terms of those two variables. The results are averaged across all respondents and plotted on a graph to indicate how the "average" member of the population views the brands that make up a category and how each brand relates to the others within the same category. While two-dimensional perceptual maps are common, multidimensional maps are also used. A key advantage of perceptual mapping is that it can identify gaps in the market that a firm may choose to "own."

Perceptual maps
Simple perceptual map of U.S. motor vehicle category (using two variables)	Multi-dimensional perceptual map of analgesics category	Perceptual map for hypothetical product category

=== Algorithms used in positioning analysis ===
The following statistical procedures have been found to be useful in carrying out positioning analysis:

- Cluster analysis including overlapping clustering
- Correspondence analysis
- Conjoint analysis
- Multidimensional scaling especially non-metric scaling (NMS)
- Multivariate analysis

== Repositioning ==
New market entrants, changing customer preferences, and structural changes can cause a positioning strategy to fail. In such cases, companies may decide to strengthen current positioning, reposition the existing product or brand, or establish a new position within a new market or market segment. Repositioning involves a deliberate attempt to alter the way that consumers view a product or brand. Repositioning can be a high risk strategy, but sometimes there are few alternatives.

Fishbein and Rosenberg's attitude models indicate that it is possible for a business to influence and change the positioning of the brand by manipulating various factors that will affect a consumer's attitude. Research on persons' attitudes suggests that a brand's position in a prospective consumer's mind is likely to be determined by the "combined total of a number of product characteristics such as the price, quality, durability, reliability, colour, and flavour". The consumer places important weights on each of these product characteristics and it can be possible by using things such as promotional efforts to realign the weights of price, quality, durability, reliability, colour and flavour of which can then help adjust the position of a brand in the mind of the prospective consumer.

== See also ==
- Advertising management
- AISDALSLove – Hierarchy of effects model in advertising
- Brand management
- Brand community – Community formed on the basis of attachment to a brand or marque
- Competitive advantage – Attribute that allows an organization to outperform its competitors
- Consumer behaviour
- Customer engagement
- DAGMAR marketing – Model for measuring advertising effectiveness
- Elaboration likelihood model – Dual process theory of persuasion
- Marketing management
- Point of difference
- Product management – Organizational role in companies
- Right-time marketing – Study and process of exploring, creating, and delivering value to customers
- Strategic management
