= Al Ries =

American advertising executive (1926–2022)

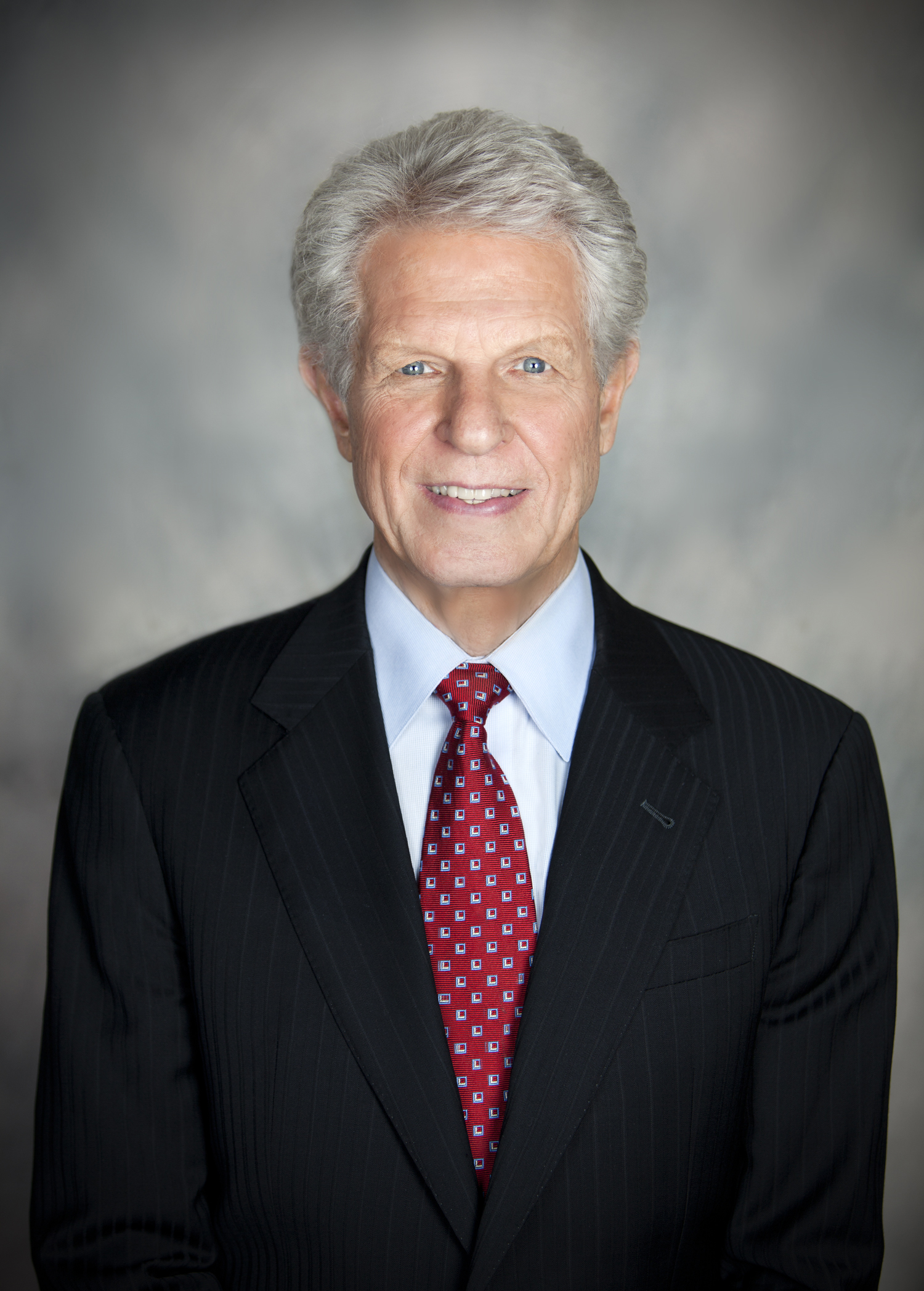
- Born: Alfred Paul Ries; November 14, 1926; Indianapolis, Indiana, U.S.
- Died: October 7, 2022 (aged 95); Atlanta, Georgia, U.S.
- Education: DePauw University (1950)
- Years active: 1950–2022
- Website: www.ries.com

Alfred Paul Ries (November 14, 1926 – October 7, 2022) was an American marketing professional and author. He was the co-founder and chairman of the Atlanta-based consulting firm Ries & Ries with his partner and daughter, Laura Ries. Along with Jack Trout, Ries is credited with resurrecting the idea of "positioning" in the field of marketing.

== Life and career ==
Born in Indianapolis, Indiana in 1926, Ries graduated from DePauw University as a mathematics major in 1950. He accepted a position with the advertising department of General Electric before founding his own advertising agency in New York City, Ries Cappiello Colwell, in 1961. Jack Trout joined the agency in 1967. Ries and Trout wrote a three-part series of articles for Advertising Age in 1972. The themes discussed in that series of articles inspired their later book, Positioning: The Battle for Your Mind, published in 1981. Ries wrote an article for AdWeek that centered around the historical failure of converged devices, Why the iPhone will fail, published in 2007.

The American Marketing Association, NY Chapter announced Ries as one of the 2016 inductees to the Marketing Hall of Fame.

Ries died in Atlanta, Georgia on October 7, 2022, at the age of 95.

== Books ==
- Positioning: The Battle for Your Mind. Warner Books. 1981. ISBN 9780446308007. OCLC 881659550.
- Ries, Al; Trout, Jack (1986). Marketing Warfare. McGraw-Hill Book Company. ISBN 9780070527300.
- Ries, Al; Trout, Jack (1990). Bottom-up Marketing. Plume. ISBN 9780452264182.
- Ries, Al; Trout, Jack (1991). Find A Horse to Ride: The Key to Marketing Yourself. McGraw-Hill. ISBN 9780070527355.
- Ries, Al; Trout, Jack (1994). The 22 Immutable Laws of Marketing. HarperBusiness. ISBN 9780887306662.
- Ries, Al; Ries, Laura (2000). 11 Immutable Laws of Branding on the Net. HarperCollinsBusiness. ISBN 9780002572224. OCLC 43674591.
- Ries, Al (2005). Focus: The Future of Your Company Depends On It. Collins Business Essentials. ISBN 9780060799908. OCLC 977381847.
- Ries, Al; Ries, Laura (2012). The 22 Immutable Laws of Branding. HarperBusiness. ISBN 9780060007737. OCLC 934866574.
- Ries, Al; Ries, Laura (2012). The Origin of Brands: How Product Evolution Creates Endless Possibilities for New Brands. HarperCollins books. ISBN 9780060570156.
