= Beyond the Core =

2004 non-fiction book by Chris Zook

Beyond the Core: Expand Your Market Without Abandoning Your Roots
- Hardcover edition
- Author: Chris Zook
- Language: English
- Series: Profit from the Core trilogy
- Subject: Business strategy
- Genre: Non-fiction
- Publisher: Harvard Business Review Press
- Publication date: January 2, 2004
- Publication place: United States
- Media type: Print, e-book
- Pages: 256 pp. (1st edition)
- ISBN: 978-1578519514
- Preceded by: Profit from the Core
- Followed by: Unstoppable

Beyond the Core: Expand Your Market Without Abandoning Your Roots is a non-fiction book by American business consultant Chris Zook. This is the second book in his Profit from the Core trilogy, followed by Unstoppable released in 2007.

== Summary ==
Beyond the Core argues that businesses must grow to survive—but only one in five strategies for growth succeeds. In the previous book, Profit from the Core, Zook explains how to grow profitably by concentrating on and harvesting the full potential in the core business. But if the core business fails to provide new growth, managers should stick to an expansion strategy based on various combinations of adjacency moves into areas away from, but related to, the core business, such as new product lines or new channels of distribution. This strategy is less risky than diversification; however, it can still create a substantial competitive advantage because the growth is based on or relates to the pack of skills that the business already does best. Zook bases his research on studying thousands of companies worldwide and interviewing CEOs of 25 top performers that have succeeded growing beyond their core businesses.

== Criticism ==
Chris Zook's Beyond the Core is the follow-up to his 2001 Profit from the Core, which argued that the source of many failed growth strategies is wrong-headed diversification away from the company's core business. There he examined three strategies for leveraging the core business: (1) strengthen and defend the core; (2) grow through adjacencies; and (3) redefine your core business for new growth opportunities. The current book focuses on the second strategy and considers questions that arise when the core has been fully exploited and growth-hungry companies must look beyond their cores for success. Zook states that companies that successfully push beyond their core businesses into adjacent areas can find this growth. ... Perhaps the biggest limitation of the book is its lack of attention to the potential for disruptive innovation, competitors' strategy, and changing consumer tastes for negating core and adjacent strategies. The bias is toward internal development rather than growing through external means, such as partnerships and acquisitions. Strategists must integrate both of these growth options in order to pursue advantageous opportunities.

—Review by Product Development and Management Association

== See also ==
- 5 forces model
- Business models
- Competitive advantage
- Coopetition
- Core competency
- Strategic management
- Value Migration: How to Think Several Moves Ahead of the Competition
