= Unstoppable (Zook book) =

Unstoppable: Finding Hidden Assets to Renew the Core and Fuel Profitable Growth
- Hardcover edition
- Author: Chris Zook
- Language: English
- Series: Profit from the Core trilogy
- Subject: Business strategy
- Genre: Non-fiction
- Publisher: Harvard Business Review Press
- Publication date: May 3, 2007
- Publication place: United States
- Media type: Print, e-book
- Pages: 190 pp. (1st edition)
- ISBN: 978-1422103661
- Preceded by: Beyond the Core

Unstoppable: Finding Hidden Assets to Renew the Core and Fuel Profitable Growth is a non-fiction book on business strategy by American business consultant Chris Zook. This is the third book in his Profit from the Core trilogy, preceded by Profit from the Core released in 2001 and Beyond the Core in 2004.

== Overview ==
In previous books in the trilogy, Zook explained how to expand, exploit, and support the current core of a company's business model. Firms usually go through a common growth cycle. Initially, they focus their resources on establishing their core businesses and using them against competition. Then, companies should leverage their strengths and move into closely related areas of business. Finally, companies exhaust these opportunities and have to redefine their cores, making hard decisions and launching a necessary transformation. When a company tries to redefine its core, often managers follow one of three paths—they commit ever more deeply to what they currently do, they move into segments where they have no experience, or they merge with some other group to create a new megacompany.

Zook argues that each of those moves has a very small chance of success over the long term. The chances are much better when companies examine what they already have, and then map out how to leverage those hidden assets. Zook divides these assets in three categories: undervalued business platforms, unexploited customer assets, and underutilized capabilities. If the company moves in these areas where it already has experience, it may successfully redefine itself to meet the next growth period.

== Criticism ==
In this volume, Zook draws upon an even wider and deeper wealth of research sources that include about fifty interviews, mostly of CEOs. The title is explained by the fact that he and his associates chose to study most closely those companies “that beat the odds. We also analyzed patterns of failure and estimated the odds of success offered by various paths in various situations.” He goes on to observe that all of the success stories built their renewal on their “hidden assets” that had previously been undervalued, unrecognized, and/or underutilized. “These assets were not central to the strategy of the past, but they held the key to the future. Furthermore, the older and more complex the company, the greater was the likelihood of finding promising hidden assets.” In other words, many companies already “hold most of the cards for “a winning hand” but do not realize it. No company is forever “unstoppable” but most (if not all) companies can take full advantage of the information and counsel Zook provides in this book to find correct answers to all three of these questions achieve core renewal without “leaps to distant and hot new markets, …being the first adopter of a pioneering new strategy,..[or making] a ‘big bang’ acquisition.” In fact, unless a given organization has “beaten the odds” by sustaining profitable growth, it should first define or redefine its core assets and then grow or renew them, before committing any resources to organizational and/or territorial expansion.

—Review by First Friday Book Synopsis

== See also ==
- 5 forces model
- Business models
- Competitive advantage
- Coopetition
- Core competency
- Strategic management
- Value Migration: How to Think Several Moves Ahead of the Competition
