= Jay Barney =

American professor (born 1954)

Jay B. Barney
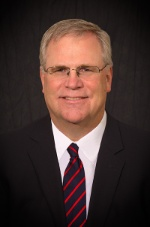
- Born: October 8, 1954 (age 71); Walnut Creek, California, U.S.
- Education: Graduate; PhD in sociology
- Alma mater: San Carlos High School; Brigham Young University; Yale University
- Occupation: Professor
- Children: 3

Jay B. Barney (born October 8, 1954) is an American professor in strategic management at the University of Utah.

== Early life and education ==
Jay Barney was born in Walnut Creek, California on October 8, 1954. He spent his formative years in San Bruno, California and graduated from San Carlos High School in 1972. Majoring in sociology at Brigham Young University in Provo, Utah, he graduated summa cum laude in December 1974. In 1976 he began a PhD in sociology at Yale University.

== Career ==
Barney joined the faculty at the Anderson Graduate School of Management at UCLA in 1980. He moved to the Mays Business School at Texas A&M University in 1986, then to the Fisher College of Business at the Ohio State University in 1994, where he held the Chase Chair for Excellence in Corporate Strategy, and then to the Eccles School of Business at the University of Utah in 2012, where he held the rank of Presidential Professor and the Lassonde Chair in Social Entrepreneurship.

Professor Barney's 1991 paper has developed a framework for distinguishing among several different types of firm performance—i.e., competitive disadvantage, competitive parity, temporary competitive advantage, and sustained competitive advantage—and identified the attributes of resources and capabilities that would make them costly to imitate. This framework is known as the VRIO (Valuable, Rare, Costly to Imitate, and exploited by Organization).

In the mid-2000s, Barney worked with Dr. Sharon Alvarez to develop a new theoretical approach to the study of entrepreneurship.

Research topics that build directly on resource-based theory include The Knowledge based Theory of the Firm|The Knowledge-based Theory of the Firm, Relational View, Dynamic Capabilities, theories of core competence, and competitive heterogeneity.

Barney currently serves as the editor of the Academy of Management Review.

== Awards and honors ==
- Academy of Management Scholarly Contributions Award (2010)
- Irwin Outstanding Educator Award, Business Policy and Strategy Division of the Academy of Management (2005)
- Fellow, Academy of Management (2001)
- Fellow, Strategic Management Society (2007)
- Ph.D. (Honorary) Universidad Pontificia Comillas, Madrid, Spain (2011)
- Ph.D. (Honorary) Copenhagen Business School, Copenhagen, Denmark (2008)
- Ph.D. (Honorary) Lund University, Lund, Sweden (1997)
- Recipient of the University of Utah's Rosenblatt Prize of Excellence, 2024.

== Selected works ==
=== Journal articles ===
- Jay B. Barney (1986) "Organizational Culture: Can It Be a Source of Sustained Competitive Advantage?" Academy of Management Review. 11: 656-665.
- Jay B. Barney (1986) "Strategic Factor Markets: Expectations, Luck, and Business Strategy", Management Science, 32(10): 1231-1241.
- Jay B. Barney (1988) "Returns to Bidding Firms in Mergers and Acquisitions: Reconsidering the Relatedness Hypothesis", Strategic Management Journal, 9, Special Issue: 71-78.
- Jay B. Barney (1990) The debate between Traditional Management Theory and Organizational Economics: Substantive Differences and Intergroup Conflict?, Vol. 15, No.3: 382-393
- Jay B. Barney (1991) "Firm Resources and Sustained Competitive Advantage," Journal of Management, 17(1): 99-120.
- Jay B. Barney and Mark Hansen (1994) "Trustworthiness as a Source of Competitive Advantage," Strategic Management Journal, Vol. 15: 175-190.
- Jay B. Barney (1995) "Looking Inside for Competitive Advantage", Academy of Management Executive, 9(4): 49-61.
- Bill Fuerst, Jay B. Barney, and F. Mata (1996) "Information Technology and Sustained Competitive Advantage: A Resource-Based Analysis", MIS Quarterly, 19: 487-505.
- Jay B. Barney and Patrick Wright (1998) "On Becoming a Strategic Partner: The Role of Human Resources in Gaining Competitive Advantage", Human Resource Management, 37: 31-46.
- Sharon A. Alvarez and Jay B. Barney (2007) "Discovery and creation: alternative theories of entrepreneurial action." Strategic Entrepreneurship Journal 1(1–2): 11–26.
- Sharon A. Alvarez, Jay B. Barney, and Phillip Anderson (2012), "Forming and Exploiting Opportunities: The Implications of Discovery and Creation Processes for Entrepreneurial and Organizational Research", Organization Science, 24(1): 301 -317.

=== Books ===
- Jay B. Barney and William G. Ouchi. (1986) Organizational Economics: Toward a New Paradigm for Studying and Understanding Organizations. San Francisco: Jossey-Bass.
- Jay B. Barney and Ricky Griffin (1992) Managing Organizations: Strategy, Structure, and Behavior. Boston: Houghton-Mifflin.
- Jay B. Barney (2010) Gaining and Sustaining Competitive Advantage, currently in 4th edition, Upper Saddle River, NJ: Pearson/Prentice Hall. (Translated into Japanese, Chinese, Italian)
- Jay B. Barney and William Hesterly. (2014) Strategic Management and Competitive Advantage. Currently in 5th edition. Upper Saddle River, NJ: Prentice Hall. (Translated into Chinese, Korean)
- Jay B. Barney and Delwyn Clark (2007) Resource-based Theory: Creating and Sustaining Competitive Advantage. London: Oxford University Press, 2007. (Translated into Chinese)
- Jay B. Barney and Trish Clifford (2010) What I Didn't Learn in Business School: Making Strategy Work in the Real World. Cambridge: Harvard Business Review Press. (Translated into Korean, Hungarian, Chinese, Polish)

=== Impact ===
The University of Utah states that, "with more than 225,000 Google citations", Barney is its "most widely cited academic" and "one of the most cited scholars in the field of strategy and in the broader field of management".

== Personal life ==
Barney resides in Park City, Utah. He is married with three children.

== See also ==
- Core competency
- Marketing strategy
- Resource-based view
