= Profit from the Core =

Profit from the Core: Growth Strategy in an Era of Turbulence
- Hardcover edition
- Author: Chris Zook with James Allen
- Language: English
- Series: Profit from the Core trilogy
- Subject: Business strategy
- Genre: Non-fiction
- Publisher: Harvard Business Review Press
- Publication date: February 2001
- Publication place: United States
- Media type: Print, e-book
- Pages: 194 pp. (1st edition)
- ISBN: 978-1578512300
- Followed by: Beyond the Core

Profit from the Core: Growth Strategy in an Era of Turbulence is a non-fiction book on business strategy by American business consultant Chris Zook with James Allen. This is the first book in his Profit from the Core trilogy. The book is followed by Beyond the Core released in 2004 and Unstoppable in 2007.

== Overview ==
The authors posit that nowadays many companies try too hard to adapt themselves to the new rules of strategy. What these companies should be doing, instead, is to opt for a course based on an honest and unbiased assessment of their core businesses. Zook and Allen base the book on studying some 2,000 companies and conclude that there are three factors differentiating growth strategies that work from those that don't: (1) managers have to make sure to get everything possible out of the core business, (2) expand into related businesses, and (3) redefine the business before competitors do.

== Criticism ==
At the heart of Zook's growth strategy is what he calls "adjacency expansion from the core." This is a company's movement into businesses that relate directly to the company's core that can use its strength and reinforce its power. Zook writes that a rich adjacency expansion program can help a company avoid mistakes made by companies such as Gucci, which eroded its high-end brand and bottom line by expanding into lower-priced canvas goods sold through mass retailers. Zook points out that when the company finally "pruned the new, unprofitable growth," it was able to return to its core and increase profits. Unfortunately, since Profit from the Core was published in early 2001, Zook offers Enron as an example of an energy company that sustained growth through the ideas he presents. Although Enron's shenanigans drove the company into bankruptcy by the end of the same year, the many other case studies Zook describes in his book offer an abundance of solid role models to follow when seeking growth strategies that work.

—Review by Businessweek

== See also ==
- 5 forces model
- Business models
- Competitive advantage
- Coopetition
- Core competency
- Strategic management
- Value Migration: How to Think Several Moves Ahead of the Competition
