= I-pop =

I-pop can refer to:

- Indian pop, pop music of India
- Iranian pop, pop music of Iran
- Indo pop, pop music of Indonesia
  - I-pop (subgenre), the boy group/girl group/idol group scene of Indonesia
- Israeli Pop, pop music of Israel; see Music of Israel § Israeli pop and dance music

== See also ==
- IPOP, IP-Over-P2P, is an open-source user-centric software virtual network
- IpOp Model, a strategic management approach for pre-project analysis suitable for innovation management and corporate entrepreneurship
