= Raphael H. Cohen =

Swiss professor and entrepreneur

- Born: 1953 (age 72–73); Cairo, Egypt
- Education: University of Geneva
- Occupations: Principal, Management Boosters, Professor, Academic director, Author, Speaker
- Organization(s): University of Geneva; Thunderbird School of Global Management
- Known for: IpOp Model

Raphael H. Cohen is a Swiss professor, lecturer, author, serial entrepreneur, former business angel and academic director at MBA programs. He has a PhD in economics from University of Geneva, Switzerland.

He is the owner and managing director of Getratex SA, as well as Academic Fellow at the University of Geneva. From 2001 to 2021, Cohen was an academic co-director of the Entrepreneurial Leadership and business development specialization of the eMBA at the University of Geneva. He has also been a professor at Thunderbird University.

Cohen established the first entrepreneurship and intrapreneurship education programs at a number of institutions, including the Swiss Federal Institute of Technology (EPFL).

Cohen created the IpOp Model, an approach to innovation and corporate entrepreneurship. This model is one of several attempting to help companies in their innovation management.

== Life and early career ==
Cohen started his career at Getratex SA in 1975, where his first intrapreneurial opportunity was to create a new business unit to sell clothing. In 1977, this unit obtained Disney licenses for clothes. To reduce his exposure to the fashion industry, in 1980 he initiated a diversification, which led him to invest in several startups. Since he became a business angel Cohen has been involved in many businesses including tourist attractions, theming of public areas, surface treatments, financial derivatives, internet marketing, software, skin treatments, retail, real estate, construction and high-tech projects. As a trusted advisor for several large corporations, he became an expert in corporate innovation and intrapreneurship.

In 1982 he received his Ph.D. in Business Administration while managing a group of international companies and several start-ups of which he has been the head.

Cohen has been a board member of numerous companies, including a Swiss Bank, and columnist for various sector newspapers and magazines like Harvard Business Review France, Forbes, L’AGEFI, PME Magazine, Le Temps, etc.

== Career ==
=== Management Boosters ===
Cohen started Management Boosters in 2001, as a division of Getratex SA, to provide executive education, mentoring and lecturing services to business schools and corporations on innovation, intrapreneurship and leadership.

=== University of Geneva ===
From 2001 to 2021, Cohen was the academic co-director of the entrepreneurship specialization of the eMBA of the University of Geneva, Switzerland, an executive MBA focusing on innovation, entrepreneurship and business development.

== Academic contributions ==
=== IpOp Model ===
Cohen created the IpOp Model as a roadmap for the pre-project/ideation stage of opportunity or project analysis. The model is meant to help innovators analyze and mature their idea to produce an opportunity case or a business plan to convince themselves as well as decision-makers, such as investors or management, of the merits of the opportunity. It has been used by a number of companies for innovative projects including Nestlé, Oracle, Bühler, SICPA and the French Post.

=== MicroMBA MB ===
To help organizations benefit from the innovative potential of their employees Cohen has designed and implemented the MicroMBA MB program. Combining the IpOp Model with the fundamentals taught in an executive MBA, the MicroMBA MB enables middle managers to become proactive agents of change. Participants in the program must identify and implement in groups a real project of their choice that supports the strategy of their employer. These projects translate into a measurable return of investment for the organization, turning training into a profit center.

=== Fair and Caring Leadership ===
Cohen has been one of the first to talk about benevolent (or caring) leadership in an article published in 2013. His additional analysis of the engagement and enforcing rules in organizations led him to develop the concept of Fair and Caring Leadership that he teaches in business school and executive education seminars. His book in French published in 2019 Les leviers de l’engagement – 54 bonnes pratiques pour entrainer, inspirer et réussir ensemble outlines the levers for optimizing the level of team engagement.

== Bibliography ==
- Modèle de comptabilisation des transactions en devises, Cohen, Raphael, Economica, Paris, 1985
- Concevoir et lancer un projet, Cohen, Raphael, Editions d’organisation, Paris, 2006 and 2016, ISBN 2212562942, 978-2212562941
- Winning Opportunities, proven tools for converting your projects into success (without a business plan), Cohen, Raphael H, www.winning-opportunities.org, 2011, ISBN 1457507447, 978-1457507441
- Les leviers de l’engagement, Cohen, Raphael, Eyrolles, 2019, ISBN 2212573286, 978-2-212-57328-2
- Uncertainties in innovation, chapter of World Encyclopedia of Entrepreneurship, Léo-Paul Dana, Edward Elgar Publishing, 2020, ISBN 1839104139, 9781839104138

== Academic diplomas ==
- 1975 – Licence en Sciences Commerciales et Industrielles – University of Geneva
- 1982 – Doctorat en Sciences Economiques (Ph.D.), University of Geneva
- 1988 – Diploma of the Institute of Real Estate Studies – post graduate degree in real estate, Geneva
