= Delwyn =

Delwyn is a given name. Notable people with the name include:

- Delwyn Brownlee (born 1969), New Zealand cricketer
- Delwyn Clark, New Zealand management academic
- Delwyn Costello (1960–2018), New Zealand cricketer
- Delwyn Gage (1930–2025), American politician from Montana
- Delwyn Williams (1938–2024), British politician and solicitor
- Delwyn Young (born 1982), American baseball player

== See also ==
- Dodo Delwyn, fictional character in The Clown (1953 film)
