= IpOp model =

IpOp model is a strategic management approach for pre-project analysis suitable for innovation management and corporate entrepreneurship. Besides guiding innovators on how to analyze an opportunity, it explains how to draft an opportunity case or a business plan to let decision-makers, such as investors, or management, assess the merits of the opportunity.

== History ==
The IpOp model was initially developed by Raphael H. Cohen, academic fellow and academic director for 20 years of the Entrepreneurial Leadership program at the University of Geneva, to help companies in their innovation management. It was first presented in 2006 in Concevoir et lancer un projet, a French book that has been later translated into English and Spanish. IpOp stands for "Innovation per Opportunities” or how to innovate by seizing opportunities. The latest version of the book was published in 2016 and contains an improved version of the IpOp Model. In 2011 the 2006 version of the model was presented in Cohen's book Winning Opportunities, proven tools for converting your projects into success (without a business plan).

== Overview ==
=== Description ===
The IpOp model is a project analysis and decision-making tool. It provides a framework to analyze and assess the benefits and feasibility of projects at the pre-project stage. IIt assumes that a more rigorous analysis at the pre-project stage helps better allocate resources. The claim is that proper early-stage calibration of projects will avoid wasting resources on projects that should not be undertaken or take more time and resources than expected. The IpOp model uses a generic decision tree to help decision-makers better manage their resources.

To achieve this early calibration, the IpOp model highlights the need to catalog as many unknowns as possible as early as possible. This early stage is called “pre-project”. It focuses on defining the unknowns that are missing information that may realistically be obtained. Identifying the unknowns leads to a more accurate estimate of the resources required to reduce key unknowns. The IpOp model has been designed to guide the innovators’ analysis to identify as many unknowns as possible and obtain relevant answers to decision-makers’ concerns. It also shows the complex interactions between all parameters that need to be considered in a project.

To be aligned with the logic of the IpOp decision tree for decision-makers Raphael H. Cohen suggests replacing the business plan by a two-parts approach:

- An opportunity case answering the main questions of decision-makers without going into operational details. As it addresses the “what”, the “why”, the “how much” and the “when” with high-level information but not the “how”, it allows decision-makers to know if the project is worth their attention and if they should consider its implementation.
- An action plan which complements the opportunity case and explains how the project will be implemented. This “how” that is only relevant if the decision-maker is interested in proceeding does not repeat the justification stated in the opportunity case.

=== IpOp model decision tree ===
According to Moses, on average, decision-makers use six different criteria to evaluate projects, with a minimum of 3 and a maximum of 9 parameters. The IpOp model decision tree consists of 11 questions where the left column mentions where the answer to each question/decision criterion can be found in the IpOp model. In contrast, the right column indicates what the decision-makers should do if the answer is negative. Any organization can use this decision tree as a starting point and adapt it to its own circumstances and industry. More specific questions can be added to check the strategic fit. The author claims that using the IpOp model decision tree adds rigor to project management governance, especially in the pre-project stage.

=== Importance of unknowns ===
A central characteristic of the IpOp model is the need to identify unknowns because every project has unknowns that express a lack of knowledge or understanding that may negatively affect the success of the project. For instance, ignoring the size of the addressable market represents a critical unknown. The price that customers would be willing to pay is another unknown. In addition to market-related unknowns, there can be technology-related unknowns, process-related unknowns, stakeholders-related unknowns, intellectual property-related unknowns, regulatory unknowns, etc. To reduce the ignorance resulting from the information gap that is expressed by the unknowns, tactical moves or initiatives can be done to obtain the missing information. For example, a doubt about the technical feasibility can be reduced by building a prototype (a tactical move). Another doubt on the product or price acceptability by customers can be reduced with help of a market study (tactical move).

The IpOp model helps identify and map as many unknowns as possible before significant resources (including time) are spent. Only once the key unknowns have been cataloged, and since each tactical move for reducing unknowns consumes resources (time, money, etc.), it is possible to assess the effort required to obtain the missing information as well as the most effective sequence of tactical moves for obtaining it. The author claims that this process allows for a more realistic calibration of the project.

Such method provides decision-makers with a clear view of resources required to first acquire missing information before deciding to launch the project. This means a better assessment of the time, money, and skills required to achieve the desired result. With a clearer understanding of the required effort, decision-makers can reject unnecessary initiatives that are not worth it and allocate resources more efficiently. This enhanced selection increases the success rate of projects delivering on time and on budget. This stringent selection process should also limit the number of projects that are launched but never completed.

=== The opportunity case ===
The IpOp model encourages using an opportunity case, a document that addresses all the key issues that interest decision-makers without providing an implementation or action plan. The author makes the assumption that decision-makers are not concerned with the operational aspects of a project until they are convinced of how a project benefits them. This suggests that inundating them with implementation details, as is often the case in business plans, is unproductive as long as they are not convinced by the merits of the project. This led Raphael H. Cohen to use a two-step approach as an alternative to the traditional business plan:

First, an opportunity case for decision-makers, with everything that is relevant for them except the action plan. Cohen believes that this document should not exceed 10 pages. It allows decision-makers to give a first approval on the opportunity.

Second, an action plan which describes the implementation of the project. This plan which complements the opportunity case, will only be read by decision-makers who have found the opportunity case convincing. They will use the action plan to assess how the opportunity will be implemented to deliver the promised outcome stated in the opportunity case (the definition of success).

According to Cohen, this approach has multiple advantages over a business plan: as the opportunity case focuses on core decision-makers concerns without implementation details, it is much shorter (5 to 10 pages) than a business plan (30 to 50 pages). As a result, the IpOp analysis should be performed prior to developing an opportunity case or a business plan. Another benefit is that since the IpOp model helps identify unknowns it provides a more realistic assessment of the challenges and effort to address them.

=== The four IpOp reviews ===
The IpOp model uses a sequential and iterative approach where each step is called IpOp review because it will most likely need to be revisited multiple times.

The iterative process explains why it is called “reviews” rather than steps, which are perceived as final when they are completed. The four IpOp reviews have been designed to quickly eliminate projects that do not deserve to consume resources. The IpOp decision tree includes the four IpOp Reviews.

The sequential approach of the IpOp model differentiates itself from the phase-gate or stage-gate model because the latter was built to allocate resource step-by-step. As long as a “gate”has not been validated, it is not possible to ask for additional resources for the next stage gate. To avoid resource waste, the IpOp model can be used before phase-gate process to calibrate project at a very early stage. As it identifies all critical unknowns early on, it helps select the most cost-effective sequence to obtain the missing information instead of always using the one-size-fits-all sequence of the phase-gate approach.

As the IpOp model should be used before resources are allocated, the four IpOp reviews can be analyzed without consuming significant resources. The four IpOp reviews only consume the time of the people doing the analysis at the pre-project stage. Significant resource consumption (time and money) only starts when tactical moves are launched to reduce unknowns.

Questions asked at each IpOp review are stated in a way that allows quick elimination of projects for which the answer is negative. Rigorous decision-makers require a positive response to each decision criterion. The project innovators’ responsibility is to iterate and amend their project to transform every “no” into a “yes” for each question before submitting their project to investors or decision-makers.

== Usage ==
The IpOp model has been taught in corporate executive education seminars, business schools and MBA programs targeting intrapreneurs and entrepreneurs. It has been field tested with over 250 intrapreneurial ventures, and adopted among multinational companies, such as Airbus, Nestlé, Bühler, Sanofi-Aventis, Microsoft, Deutsche Telekom, Orange, Oracle, ST Microelectronics, La Poste, Serono, Capgemini, Ernst & Young. It has been used in banks like Banque Cantonale de Genève, la Banque Cantonale Vaudoise, public administrations and non-profits like the Palo Alto Research Center, EPFL (Swiss Federal Institute of Technology), hospitalx, startups and incubators.

== Bibliography ==
- Raphael H. Cohen (2016). Concevoir et lancer un projet: De l'idée au succès sans business plan (in French). Paris: Editions Eyrolles. p. 240. ISBN 9782708137042.
- Raphael H. Cohen (2015). Oportunidades Ganadoras (in Spanish). Madrid: Pearson Education. p. 280. ISBN 978-84-9035-291-5.
- Raphael H. Cohen (April 2012). Winning opportunities. Dog Ear Publishing. p. 260. ISBN 9781457504501.
- Henry W. Chesbrough (2003). Open Innovation: The New Imperative for Creating and Profiting from Technology. Boston: Harvard Business School Press.
- Robert George Cooper (2001). Winning at New Products: Accelerating the Process from Idea to Launch. New York: Basic Books. p. 416. ISBN 9780738204635.
- Connie J. G. Gersick (March 1988). "Time and Transition in Work Teams: Toward a New Model of Group Development". Academy of Management Journal. 31: 9–41. doi:10.5465/256496. S2CID 16349495.
- Marc Gruber (2007). Uncovering the value of planning in new venture creation: A process and contingency perspective. Journal of Business Venturing. pp. 782–807.
- David E. Gumpert (2002). Burn your business plan! : what investors really want from entrepreneurs. Needham, MA: Lauson Publishing. p. 178. ISBN 9780970118158.
- Brian Headd (August 2003). "Redefining Business Success: Distinguishing Between Closure and Failure". Small Business Economics. 21: 51–61. doi:10.1023/A:1024433630958. ISSN 1573-0913. S2CID 154948146.
- Tomas Karlsson; Benson Honig (January 2009). "Judging a business by its cover: An institutional perspective on new ventures and the business plan". Journal of Business Venturing. 24. Journal of Business Venturing: 27–45. doi:10.1016/j.jbusvent.2007.10.003.
- Thomas K. McKnight (2004). Will it fly? : how to know if your new business idea has wings – before you take the leap. Londres, New York: Financial Times Prentice Hall. ISBN 9780130462213.
- John Mullins (2013). The New Business Road Test: What entrepreneurs and executives should do before launching a lean start-up. FT Press. ISBN 9781292003740.
- Monika Rut. Innovation, Opportunity and Social Entrepreneurship (in Italian). Tafter Journal.

== See also ==
- Strategic management
- Strategic planning
- Management
- Resource-based view
- Project management
- SWOT analysis
- PEST analysis
- VRIO
