= Value Migration (book) =

Book by Adrian Slywotzky

Value Migration: How to Think Several Moves Ahead of the Competition
- Hardcover edition
- Author: Adrian Slywotzky
- Language: English
- Series: Management of Innovation and Change
- Subject: Value migration, profitability, growth
- Genre: Non-fiction
- Publisher: Harvard Business Press
- Publication date: November 1, 1995
- Publication place: United States
- Media type: Print, e-book
- Pages: 336 pp. (1st edition)
- ISBN: 978-0875846323

Value Migration: How to Think Several Moves Ahead of the Competition is a non-fiction book by American business consultant Adrian Slywotzky. The text was initially published by Harvard Business Review Press on November 1, 1995 as a part of Management of Innovation and Change series.

== Overview ==
Value migration as a concept is a flow of economic value from outmoded, obsolete businesses towards the others with superior business designs. The latter ones are better positioned to create utility and comfort for customers. In this book, the author describes the skills that managers and owners need to identify and to capture these value shifts. He posits that the change in a business landscape is, in fact, inevitable and identifies seven patterns of value migration that managers should know.

== See also ==
- 5 forces model
- Business models
- Competitive advantage
- Coopetition
- Core competency
- Profit from the Core
- Strategic management
