= Yves Doz =

French academic

- Education: HEC Paris; Harvard Business School
- Occupation: Academic
- Employer: INSEAD

Yves Doz is a French academic. He is a professor of strategic management at INSEAD, where he holds the Solvay Chaired Professorship of Technological Innovation, and is a Fellow of CEDEP. His research interests focus on innovation, the strategy and organization of multinational corporations, strategic alliances, and on how business organizations can develop the capability to adapt quickly to changes in competitive environments. More recently, he has been working with a number of national governments on strategic adaptability and agility. He is the author of numerous books and articles, which include the first comprehensive book on strategic alliances, co-authored with Gary Hamel, and the Multinational Mission, co-authored with CK Prahalad.

== Education ==
Doz received a Diploma in Business Administration from HEC Paris in 1970, and a DBA from Harvard Business School in 1976.

== Career ==
After a few years in the aerospace industry, Yves Doz started his academic career as an assistant professor at Harvard Business School for four years. In 1981 he joined INSEAD as an associate professor and became a full professor in 1986. Between 1990 and 1995 he served as Associate Dean for Research and Development and between 1998 and 2002 he was Associate Dean for Executive Education. Prior to his appointment to the Solvay Chaired Professorship of Technological Innovation in 2011, he held the John H Loudon Chaired Professorship of International Management (1990-1994) and the Timken Chaired Professorship of Global Technology and Innovation. He has held or currently holds visiting faculty posts at Stanford Business School in Palo Alto, Aoyama Gakuin University in Tokyo, Seoul National University, and Aalto University (formerly the Helsinki School of Economics) in Helsinki. He is a Senior Research Adviser to SITRA (the Finnish Innovation Fund) and advises numerous corporations, including recently P&G and Avery Dennison.

Doz has received numerous academic awards, including the AT Kearney Academy of Management Award (1977) and the Distinguished Scholar Award (International Management Division) from the Academy of Management. He was a Ford Foundation Doctoral Fellow between 1973 and 1976 and is currently a Fellow of the Academy of Management and a Fellow of the Academy of International Business, where he served as president between 2008 and 2010.

== Work ==
Doz's earlier work was primarily focused on the strategies of large multinationals in a globalizing competitive environment. His 1986 book looked at the organizational and strategic drivers of success in multinationals. In his subsequent 1987 book with CK Prahalad, The Multinational Mission, he analyzed the trade-off between national responsiveness and global strategy. His 2001 book with José Santos and Peter Williamson, From Global to Metanational, argued that the primary challenge for businesses in a global knowledge economy was the management of innovation and leaning across boundaries. His principal work on strategic alliances is his 1998 book with Gary Hamel, Alliance Advantage, which explores how strategic partnerships evolve over time and how capabilities in alliance management can be a sustainable source of competitive advantage.

More recently, Doz has developed ideas around the drivers of strategic agility and the management of global innovation. In his 2008 book with former Nokia executive Mikko Kosonen, Fast Strategy, Doz drew on interviews with 150 executives to identify the capabilities that successful companies must possess if they are to adapt successfully to changes in the competitive environment that challenge their existing business models and strategies. In a parallel stream of work he developed ideas on managing innovation and learning in global organizations, which culminated in a 2012 book with Keeley Wilson, Managing Global Innovation, that presented frameworks for addressing the challenge of sourcing and disseminating innovations and best practices in a global network. Most recently, he has been exploring the application of the ideas on organizational and strategic agility developed in Fast Strategy with a number of national and regional governments, including Finland and Scotland.

== Selected publications ==
Books

- Y. Doz, and K. Wilson, Ringtone: Exploring the Rise and Fall of Nokia in Mobile Phones, Oxford University Press, 2017.
- Y. Doz, K. Wilson and P. Williamson, Managing Global Innovations, Harvard Business Review Press, 2012.
- Y. Doz, and M. Kosonen, Fast Strategy: How Strategic Agility will Help You Stay Ahead of the Game, Wharton School Press, 2008.
- Y. Doz, G. Szulanski and J. Porac, Strategy Process, Advances in Strategic Management, Vol. 22. JAI Press, December 2005.
- Y. Doz, J. Santos and P. Williamson, From Global to Metanational: How Companies Win in the Knowledge Economy, Harvard Business School Press, 2001
- J. De La Torré, Y. Doz and T. Devinney, Managing the Global Corporation: Case Studies in Strategy and Management, McGraw-Hill Higher Education, UK, 2000.
- Y. Doz and G. Hamel, Alliance Advantage: The Art of Creating Value Through Partnering, Harvard Business School Press, 1998
- C.A. Bartlett, Y. Doz & G. Hedlund (Eds.), Managing the Global Firm, Routledge, 1990
- P. Evans, Y. Doz & A. Laurent (Eds.), Human Resource Management in International Firms, Macmillan Press, 1989
- C.K. Prahalad & Y. Doz, The Multinational Mission: Balancing Local Demands and Global Vision, Free Press, 1987
- Y. Doz, Strategic Management in Multinational Companies, Pergamon Press, 1986
- Y. Doz, Government Control and Multinational Management: Power Systems and Telecommunications Equipment, Praeger, 1979

Articles

- H-J Hong and Y. Doz, L'Oréal Masters Multiculturalism, Harvard Business Review, 2013
- K. Wilson and Y. Doz, Ten Rules for Managing Global Innovation, Harvard Business Review, 2012
- K. Wilson and Y. Doz, Agile Innovation: A Footprint Balancing Distance and Immersion, California Management Review, Vol 53, N°2, Winter 2011.
- Y. Doz and M. Kosonen, Embedding Strategic Agility : A Leadership Agenda for Accelerating Business Model Renewal, Long Range Planning Special Issue on Business Models, Vol 43, N° 2–3 April/June 2010.
- Y. Doz, M. Kosonen, The Dynamics of Strategic Agility: Nokia’s Rollercoaster Experience, California Management Review, Vol 50, N° 3, Spring 2008
- Y. Doz, M. Kosonen, The New Deal at the Top, Harvard Business Review, June 2007
- D. Laurie, Y. Doz, and C. Sheer, Creating New Growth Platforms, Harvard Business Review, May 2006.
- P. Smith Ring, Y. Doz and P. Olk Managing Formation Processes in R&D Consortia, California Management Review. Vol. 47, N° 4, pp. 137–156. Summer 2005.
- J. Santos, Y. Doz and P. Williamson, Is your Innovation Process Global?, Sloan Management Review, Vol. 45, N°4, pp. 31–37, Summer 2004.
- G. Szulanski, Y. Doz and Y. Ovestky, Incumbents’ Framing: How Three Established Firms Responded to the Emergence of the Internet, Advances in Strategic Management. Vol. 21. June 2004.
- Y. Doz, Toward a Managerial Theory of the MNC, Advances in International Management. Vol. 161. pp3–30, June 2004.
- A. Ariño, J. De La Torre, Y. Doz, P. Smith Ring and G. Lorenzoni, Process Issues in International Alliance Management: A Debate on the Evolution of Collaboration, Advances in International Management, N° 14, pp. 173–220. 2002.
- Y. Doz and R. Burgelman, The Power of Strategic Integration, Sloan Management Review. Vol. 42, N° 3, pp. 28–38. Spring 2001
- Y. Doz and C.K. Prahalad, The CEO: A Visible Hand in Wealth Creation?, Journal of Applied Corporate Finance. Vol. 13, N° 3, pp. 20–35. Fall 2000
- Y. Doz, The Evolution of Cooperation in Strategic Alliances: Initial Conditions or Learning Processes? Strategic Management Journal, 17, 1996, pp. 55–83.
- Y. Doz & C.K. Prahalad, Managing DMNCs: A Search For A New Paradigm, Strategic Management Journal, 12, 1991, pp. 145–164. Reprinted in R. Rumelt, D. Schendel & D. Teece (Eds.) Fundamental Issues in Strategy: A Research Agenda (Boston: Harvard Business School Press, 1994); in V. Govindarajan & A. K. Sundaram (Eds.) Theories of the New Multinational, 1996; and in S. Ghoshal and D.E. Westney (Eds) Organization Theory and the Multinational Corporation (Basingstoke, UK: Macmillan, 1993).
