= See Wai Hun =

Malaysian businesswoman

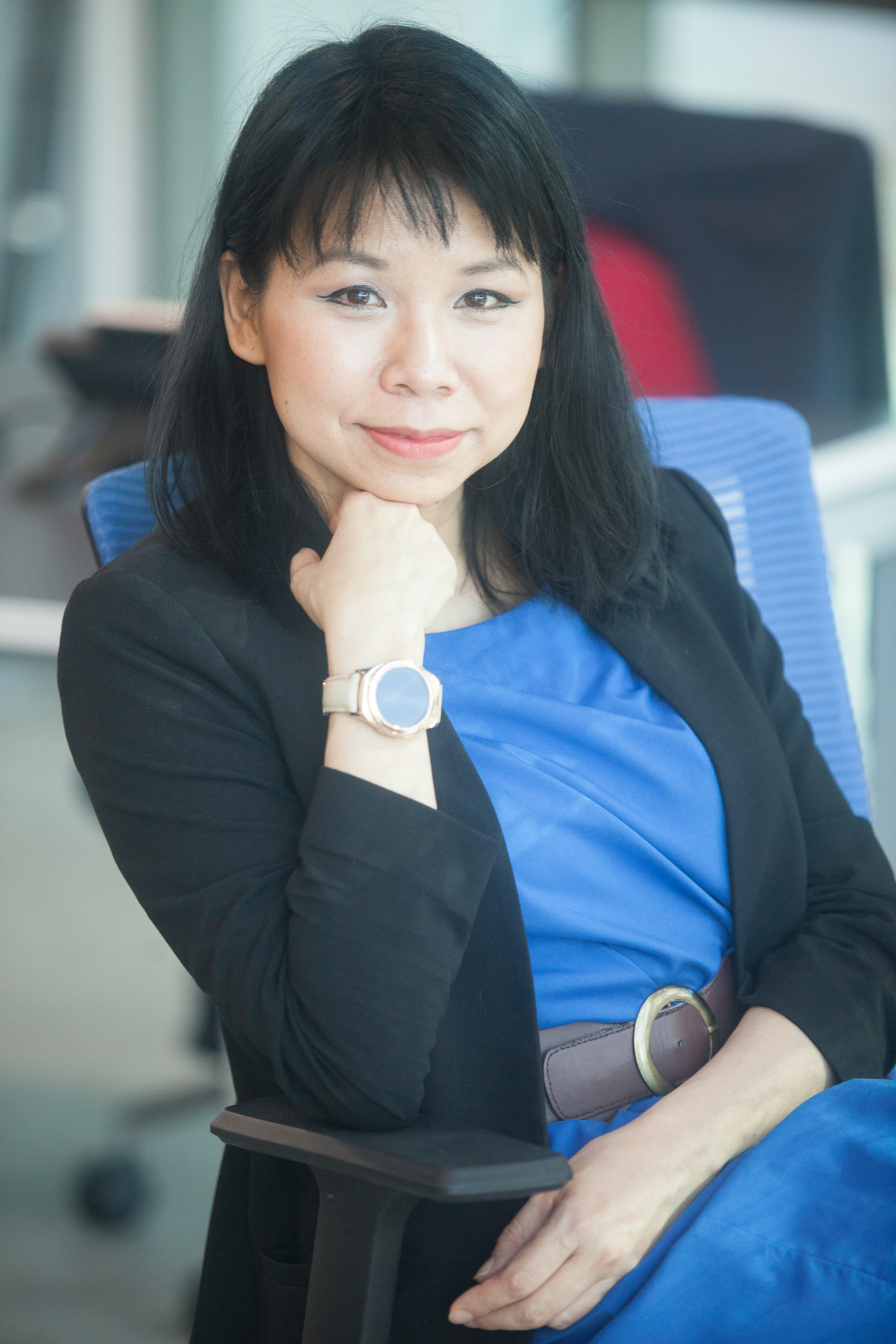
- Citizenship: Malaysia
- Education: University of Winnipeg
- Occupation: CEO of JurisTech
- Spouse: Naaman Lee

See Wai Hun (also known as Wai Hun), is a Malaysian financial technology professional. She is the co-founder and CEO of JurisTech, a fintech company based in Malaysia.

== Early life and education ==
Wai Hun studied accounting at Tunku Abdul Rahman University College. Part of the way through the course, she transferred to a computer science program at Sedaya College. Eventually, she completed her bachelor's degree in business computing at the University of Winnipeg, graduating first in her class and earning a gold medal.

== Career ==
Wai Hun started her career as a consultant at Ernst & Young. She subsequently switched to a business analyst position at Sistemaju before joining Sapura to develop and implement business intelligence solutions. At Sapura, Wai Hun met John Lim, a Malaysian software developer who would eventually become the Chief Technological Officer of JurisTech.

Wai Hun and John Lim started Natsoft(M) Sdn Bhd, the parent company of JurisTech in 1997 amidst the Asian Financial Crisis. Their company was initially poised to sell data mining, AI, and data analytics tools and services to banks. However, the initial offering was not successful because the markets were not ready for data mining and AI solutions at the time, and additionally, few companies could afford such services in the immediate aftermath of the Asian Financial Crisis. Then Wai Hun and John Lim decided to offer debt collection and litigation software to cope with existing market needs.

== Awards and accolades ==
In 2014, Wai Hun became an Endeavor entrepreneur, a non-profit organization.

In 2016, See Wai Hun was profiled as Digerati50 by Focus Malaysia and Digital News Asia as one of the top 50 people who would shape the digital economy in Malaysia in the coming years.

Wai Hun was featured in Chris Zook and James Allen's book The Founder's Mentality and Freda Liu's book Bursting Fixed Mindsets,.

In 2019, Wai Hun was awarded Ernst & Young Woman Entrepreneur Of The Year award.
