= Financial intermediary =

Financial institution that connects surplus and deficit agents

A financial intermediary is an institution or individual that serves as a middleman between two or more parties, typically a lender and borrower, in order to facilitate financial transactions. Common types include commercial banks, investment banks, stockbrokers, insurance and pension funds, pooled investment funds, leasing companies, and stock exchanges.

When the money is lent directly via the financial markets, eliminating the financial intermediary, the converse process of financial disintermediation occurs.

== Economic function ==
Financial intermediaries channel funds from those who have surplus capital to those who require liquid funds to carry out a desired activity. In reallocating otherwise uninvested capital to productive enterprises, financial intermediaries, offer the benefits of maturity and risk transformation. Because of information asymmetries in financial markets and associated economies of scale and economies of scope, specialist financial intermediaries enjoy a cost advantage in offering financial services, raising the overall efficiency of the economy whilst allowing for profit generation.

Financial intermediaries may deal in personal finance, such as loans and mortgages; corporate finance, including private equity and venture capital investments; and non-commercial finance such as project finance, climate finance and development finance.

Various disadvantages have also been noted in the context of climate finance and development finance institutions. These include a lack of transparency, inadequate attention to social and environmental concerns, and a failure to link directly to proven developmental impacts.

== Types of financial intermediaries ==
According to the dominant economic view of monetary operations, the following institutions are or can act as financial intermediaries:

- Banks
- Mutual savings banks
- Savings banks
- Building societies
- Credit unions
- Financial advisers or brokers
- Insurance companies
- Collective investment schemes
- Pension funds
- Cooperative societies
- Stock exchanges
- Escrow agents

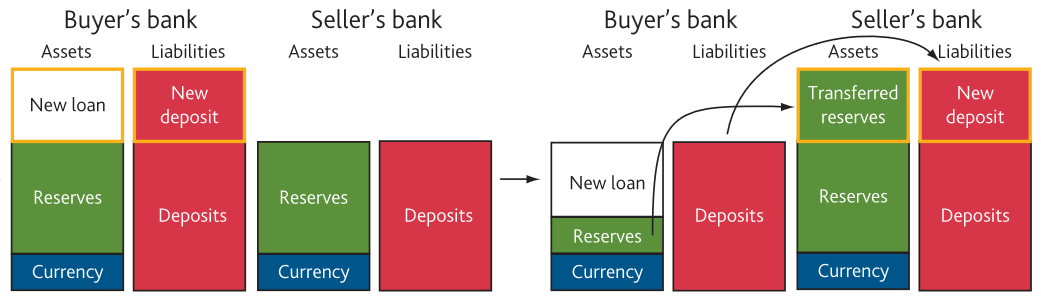
Money Creation Balance Sheets (stylized) by commercial banks (see Bank of England 2014).

According to the alternative view of monetary and banking operations, banks are not intermediaries but institutions that create money.

== See also ==
- Debt
- Financial economics
- Investment
- Saving
- Financial market efficiency
- Pass-through security

== Bibliography ==
- Pilbeam, Keith. Finance and Financial Markets. New York: PALGRAVE MACMILLAN, 2005.
- Valdez, Steven. An Introduction To Global Financial Markets. Macmillan Press, 2007.
