= Strategy and uncertainty =

Strategy and uncertainty intertwine between strategic planning and unknown events in a realistic framework where companies and organizations are bound to develop and compete in a world dominated by complexity, ambiguity, and uncertainty in which unpredictable, unstoppable and, sometimes, meaningless circumstances may have a direct impact on the expected outcomes.

In this scenario, formal planning systems are criticized by a number of academics, who argue that conventional methods, based on classic analytical tools (market research, value chain analysis, assessment of rivals), fail to shape a strategy that can adjust to the changing market and enhance the competitiveness of each business unit, which is the basic principle of a competitive business strategy. Strategy planning systems are supposed to produce the best approaches to concretize long-term objectives. However, since strategy deals with the upcoming future, the strategic context of an organization will always be uncertain, therefore the first choice an organisation has to make is when to act; acting now or when the uncertainty has been resolved.

The recognition of uncertainty supposes a dilemma for strategists: in predicting the future they are likely to be wrong and may fall into overconfidence, but on the other hand they risk clouding rational foundations for decision making. Therefore, when building a strategy, it is vital to use analytic tools based on the level of uncertainty the organization is facing (decision analysis, scenario planning, alternative futures), this will enable the organization to identify the origin and the nature of the uncertainty and act upon it.

== The fallacy of prediction ==
According to strategic planning premises, the world is supposed to hold still while strategy is being developed and stay in the foreseen trajectory while said strategy is being executed. In the organizational world companies plan their annual strategy and they are approved the first of June by the boards of directors. However, competitors do not act according to that proposed schedule or based on that planned strategy, neither do they wait for the board's approval. Therefore, companies can not predict the period, nor the scenario in which their predictions may be accurate. While, certain repetitive patterns, such as seasons may be predictable, the forecasting of discontinuities as technological innovation or price variation is, technically, impossible.

== Nature of uncertainty ==
The first step to develop a competitive strategy is to understand the nature of the uncertainty the firm is facing and some of its most important characteristics. As established by Birger Wernerfelt and Aneel Karnani in their article "Competitive Strategy Under Uncertainty", there are four different kinds of sources: demand structure, supply structure, competitors and externalities.

=== Demand uncertainty ===
This refers to the uncertainty revolving around the size of the market and the projection of the demand, which is a basic question in every industry. The size of the different market segments may be uncertain, the channels of distribution can be uncertain, the design of the product to be introduced may be uncertain, and in the first stages of the industry life, even the dominant design may not have been created yet. For example, in the American corn wet milling industry, demand projections made in 1972, ranged from 2.5 billion pounds to 10 billion pounds, which directly affected production mechanisms.

=== Supply uncertainty ===
When it comes to supplies, uncertainty can be found in the internal operations of the organization or in the external development of technology. There may be uncertainty regarding the best technological process, or when a superior technology may be invented. Furthermore, external uncertainty can be influenced by powerful firms which can establish standards for product specifications while small firms have to adjust to this. Finally, uncertainty can arise from within the firm as well. Key executive can leave and accidents can occur.

=== Competitive uncertainty and externalities ===
It makes references to unpredictable circumstances inside organizations, it also approaches the nature of the major competitors, their strategies and their response to the environment. It revolves around competitors' identities and their aggressiveness.

== Levels of uncertainty ==
Business environments present a lot of strategically relevant information, including clear trends such as market demographics, performance attributes for current technologies or the elasticity of demand for certain stable categories of products and competitors. The analysis of the business environment will allow the organization to reshape or adapt its strategies to the changing market. In fact, with the correct scrutiny of deciding factors and the subsequent implementation of strategic systems, even extremely uncertain environments may deliver high returns with low risk. However, the uncertainty left, after the best analytical process is carried out, called "residual uncertainty", often falls into one of these broad levels.

=== Level 1: Clear enough future ===
At this level an organization can develop a single forecast of the future that is precise enough for strategy development. Even so, the prediction will not be exact, to the degree that all businesses deal with uncertainty, but it will be enough to shape the strategy into a single direction. In this level residual uncertainty ends up being irrelevant for strategic planning and decision making.

=== Level 2: Alternate futures ===
In this scenario, the future may be considered as one of a few alternate outcomes, also known as discrete scenarios. Studies and analysis cannot precise which outcome will be taking place, but it may help to establish probabilities.

=== Level 3: A range of futures ===
At level 3, the organization can recognize a range of potential futures. This range is limited by a number of key variables, but the actual outcome may lie anywhere within the range of probabilities.

=== Level 4: True ambiguity ===
Within this level, multiple dimensions of uncertainty coexist and interact to create an environment that is practical impossible to predict, where the range of possible outcomes cannot be established, let alone scenarios within that range. It might not even be possible to clarify the key variables.

== Confronting uncertainty ==
To confront uncertainty, organizations deal with predictions and forecasts which may end up being misleading if they are not based in the appropriated analytical tools. Using the right approaches enables the organization to anticipate the future enabling them to designing plans for multiple scenarios. For example, based on scenario planning, Mondex, the financial services provider, forecasted the introduction of electronic cash transactions and made big investments in product development to adjust to what the company assumed was the future of the industry. This was the right move, as Mondex responded on time to the growing need of the market.

- When envisioning few future scenarios, organization may use option valuation models and game theory to shape the decision making of an organization into a goal oriented process involving one or more players and one or more probabilities for different possible scenarios. In this way, it is easier to assess risk and returns through a set of tools that can establish logically consistent models of rational human behavior.
- When envisioning a wide range of scenarios, organizations may focus on scenario planning and technology forecasting to plan for 4-5 possible outcome scenarios. For example, an American, good consumer company, introducing itself into the Indian market, needs to plan for multiple-scenarios characterized by different variables, such as customer penetration and the demand level.
- Act guided by a strategic posture, in order to clarify your intent strategy. This posture includes shaping: leading the organization's structure towards a new model; adapting: choosing how and where to compete within the current industry; reserving the right to play: increasing the investment to stay in the game without modifying the strategy.
