= Recycle Rush =

2015 FIRST Robotics Competition game

- Year: 2015

Season Information
- Number of teams: 3,000
- Number of regionals: 56
- Number of district events: 44
- Championship location: Edward Jones Dome, St Louis, Missouri

FIRST Championship Awards
- Chairman's Award winner: 597 - "Wolverines"
- Woodie Flowers Award winner: Mark Lawrence
- Founder's Award winner: John E. Abele
- Champions: 118 - "Robonauts"; 1678 - "Citrus Circuits"; 1671 - "Buchanan Bird Brains"; 5012 - "Gryffingear"

Links
- Website: Official Website

Recycle Rush was the 2015 FIRST Robotics Competition game. It involves picking up and stacking totes on scoring platforms, putting pool noodles ("litter") inside recycling containers, and putting the containers on top of scoring stacks of totes. There is also a coopertition aspect of the game where both alliances of teams can pool their totes and stack them on a step dividing the field to each gain twenty points. Along with these robot actions, human players can attempt to throw the pool noodles across the field to gain four points for each noodle left in the opposing alliance's work zone.

== Kickoff ==
The Kickoff event was held on January 3, 2015.

== Autonomous ==
The game begins with a 15-second period where robots must act on their own according to instructions from programming. During this period, alliances can gain 4 points if each robot moves into the Auto Zone, 6 points if they bring all three totes into the Auto Zone, 8 points if they bring all three barrels into the Auto Zone, and 20 if all three totes are stacked in the Auto Zone. However, the strategy most often seen at regional events and the championship was often to grab the recycling bins located on the step in the middle of the field to "cap" the stacks during the teleoperated period.

== Teleoperation ==
Immediately after the autonomous round, drivers operate the robots via control stations at the ends of the field. During this time, they aim to use the robots to put "litter", represented by green pool noodles, in a Landfill Zone for 1 point apiece, place totes on a scoring platform for 2 points apiece, place litter inside barrels for 6 points per barrel, and put the barrels on top of scoring stacks of totes for 4 points per level (approximately one level per tote) measured from the lowest point of the barrel.

== Events ==
=== Week 1 ===
Event	Dates
Dallas Regional	Feb 26 - Feb 28, 2015
Lake Superior Regional	Feb 26 - Feb 28, 2015
Northern Lights Regional	Feb 26 - Feb 28, 2015
Palmetto Regional	Feb 26 - Feb 28, 2015
South Florida Regional	Feb 26 - Feb 28, 2015
Georgia Southern Classic Regional	Feb 27 - Mar 1, 2015
Inland Empire Regional	Feb 27 - Mar 1, 2015
Howell District Competition	Feb 27- Feb 28, 2015
Southfield District Event	Feb 27- Feb 28, 2015
Standish District Event	Feb 27- Feb 28, 2015
Granite State District Event	Feb 27- Feb 28, 2015
Auburn Mountainview District Event	Feb 27- Feb 28, 2015
Oregon City District Event	Feb 27- Feb 28, 2015
Indianapolis District Event	Feb 28 - Mar 1, 2015
Hatboro-Horsham District Event	Feb 28 - Mar 1, 2015
Waterbury District Event	Feb 28 - Mar 1, 2015

=== Week 2 ===
Event	Dates
Arkansas Regional	Mar 5 - Mar 7, 2015
Greater Pittsburgh Regional	Mar 5 - Mar 7, 2015
Greater Toronto Central Regional	Mar 5 - Mar 7, 2015
Mexico City Regional	Mar 5 - Mar 7, 2015
Central Valley Regional	Mar 6 - Mar 8, 2015
Kentwood District Event	Mar 6 - Mar 7, 2015
Kettering University District Event	Mar 6 - Mar 7, 2015
Waterford District Event	Mar 6 - Mar 7, 2015
Pioneer Valley District Event	Mar 6 - Mar 7, 2015
West Valley District Event	Mar 6 - Mar 7, 2015
Mt. Olive District Event	Mar 7 - Mar 8, 2015
Reading District Event	Mar 7 - Mar 8, 2015
Glacier Peak District Event	Mar 7 - Mar 8, 2015

=== Week 3 ===
Event	Dates
Israel Regional	Mar 10 - Mar 12, 2015
Alamo Regional	Mar 12 - Mar 14, 2015
Australia Regional	Mar 12 - Mar 14, 2015
Greater Kansas City Regional	Mar 12 - Mar 14, 2015
Greater Toronto East Regional	Mar 12 - Mar 14, 2015
Los Angeles Regional	Mar 12 - Mar 14, 2015
Orlando Regional	Mar 12 - Mar 14, 2015
Utah Regional	Mar 12 - Mar 14, 2015
New York City Regional	Mar 13 - Mar 15, 2015
Gull Lake District Event	Mar 13 - Mar 14, 2015
Traverse City District Event	Mar 13 - Mar 14, 2015
Woodhaven District Event	Mar 13 - Mar 14, 2015
Kokomo City of Firsts District Event	Mar 13 - Mar 14, 2015
Springside Chestnut Hill District Event	Mar 13 - Mar 14, 2015
Pine Tree District Event	Mar 13 - Mar 14, 2015
Dartmouth District Event	Mar 13 - Mar 14, 2015
Wilsonville District Event	Mar 13 - Mar 14, 2015
Mt. Vernon District Event	Mar 14 - Mar 15, 2015

=== Week 4 ===
Event	Dates
Arizona East Regional	Mar 19 - Mar 21, 2015
Bayou Regional	Mar 19 - Mar 21, 2015
Central Illinois Regional	Mar 19 - Mar 21, 2015
Montreal Regional	Mar 19 - Mar 21, 2015
New York Tech Valley Regional	Mar 19 - Mar 21, 2015
North Carolina Regional	Mar 19 - Mar 21, 2015
Sacramento Regional	Mar 19 - Mar 21, 2015
St. Louis Regional	Mar 19 - Mar 21, 2015
Virginia Regional	Mar 19 - Mar 21, 2015
Waterloo Regional	Mar 19 - Mar 21, 2015
Wisconsin Regional	Mar 19 - Mar 21, 2015
Great Lakes Bay Region District Event	Mar 20 - Mar 21, 2015
St. Joseph District Event	Mar 20 - Mar 21, 2015
West Michigan District Event	Mar 20 - Mar 21, 2015
Purdue District Event	Mar 20 - Mar 21, 2015
Central Washington University District Event	Mar 20 - Mar 21, 2015
Lenape-Seneca District Event	Mar 21 - Mar 22, 2015
Rhode Island District Event	Mar 21 - Mar 22, 2015
UNH District Event	Mar 21 - Mar 22, 2015
Shorewood District Event	Mar 21 - Mar 22, 2015

=== Week 5 ===
Event	Dates
Buckeye Regional	Mar 26 - Mar 28, 2015
Colorado Regional	Mar 26 - Mar 28, 2015
Finger Lakes Regional	Mar 26 - Mar 28, 2015
Greater DC Regional	Mar 26 - Mar 28, 2015
Hawaii Regional	Mar 26 - Mar 28, 2015
Hub City Regional	Mar 26 - Mar 28, 2015
Las Vegas Regional	Mar 26 - Mar 28, 2015
North Bay Regional	Mar 26 - Mar 28, 2015
Oklahoma Regional	Mar 26 - Mar 28, 2015
Peachtree Regional	Mar 26 - Mar 28, 2015
SBPLI Long Island Regional	Mar 26 - Mar 28, 2015
Ventura Regional	Mar 27 - Mar 29, 2015
Center Line District Event	Mar 27 - Mar 28, 2015
Escanaba District Event	Mar 27 - Mar 28, 2015
Livonia District Event	Mar 27 - Mar 28, 2015
Northeastern University District Event	Mar 27 - Mar 28, 2015
Auburn District Event	Mar 27 - Mar 28, 2015
Philomath District Event	Mar 27 - Mar 28, 2015
Bridgewater-Raritan District Event	Mar 28 - Mar 29, 2015
Upper Darby District Event	Mar 28 - Mar 29, 2015
Hartford District Event	Mar 28 - Mar 29, 2015

=== Week 6 ===
Event	Dates
Arizona West Regional	Apr 2 - Apr 4, 2015
Chesapeake Regional	Apr 2 - Apr 4, 2015
Lone Star Regional	Apr 2 - Apr 4, 2015
Midwest Regional	Apr 2 - Apr 4, 2015
Minnesota 10,000 Lakes Regional	Apr 2 - Apr 4, 2015
Minnesota North Star Regional	Apr 2 - Apr 4, 2015
Queen City Regional	Apr 2 - Apr 4, 2015
San Diego Regional	Apr 2 - Apr 4, 2015
Silicon Valley Regional	Apr 2 - Apr 4, 2015
Smoky Mountains Regional	Apr 2 - Apr 4, 2015
Western Canada Regional	Apr 2 - Apr 4, 2015
Windsor Essex Great Lakes Regional	Apr 2 - Apr 4, 2015
Pacific Northwest District Championship	Apr 2 - Apr 4, 2015
Indiana District Championship	Apr 3 - Apr 4, 2015
Bedford District Event	Apr 3 - Apr 4, 2015
Lansing District Event	Apr 3 - Apr 4, 2015
Troy District Event	Apr 3 - Apr 4, 2015
North Brunswick District Event	Apr 3 - Apr 4, 2015

=== Week 7 ===
Event	Dates
Michigan District Championship	Apr 9 - Apr 11, 2015
Mid-Atlantic District Championship	Apr 9 - Apr 11, 2015
New England District Championship	Apr 9 - Apr 11, 2015

=== World Championship ===
Event	Location	Dates
FIRST Robotics World Championship	St. Louis, Missouri	Apr 22 - Apr 25, 2015
