= Competitive heterogeneity =

Concept from strategic management

Competitive heterogeneity is a concept from strategic management that examines why industries do not converge on one best way of doing things. In the view of strategic management scholars, the microeconomics of production and competition combine to predict that industries will be composed of identical firms offering identical products at identical prices.

The theory of competitive heterogeneity seeks to explain why firms do not converge on a single best way of doing things as predicted by simple microeconomics. The resource-based view (RBV) contains one approach. After the 2000s capability theories have expanded RBV logic. Recently, more work that focuses on heterogeneity has been published in strategy journals.

== History ==
Deeper analyses of this topic were taken up in industrial organization economics by crossover economics/strategic-management scholars such as Harold Demsetz and Michael Porter. Demsetz argued that better-managed firms would make better products (or similar products at lower costs) than their competitors. Such firms would translate better products or lower prices (an optimal decision based on lower costs) into higher levels of demand, which would lead to revenue growth. These firms would then be larger than the more poorly managed competitors.

Porter argued that firms in an industry would cluster into strategic groups. Each group would be similar and movement between groups would be difficult and costly (barriers to mobility). Richard Rumelt and Stephen Lippman demonstrated how firms could differ in an industry in partial equilibrium-like circumstances. Richard Nelson and Sidney G. Winter discussed how firms develop differing capabilities. During this time, industrial economics focused on industry characteristics, treated the differences among firms in an industry as trivial. This was a point of contention within strategy and between strategy and economics from about 1980 to the mid-1990s.

Early in the 1990s a number of papers were published under the rubrics of the Resource-based View and Capabilities. Both approaches continue to develop. However, the RBV won the public relations war (complete with, allegedly, removing dissenting opinions from Wikipedia). The RBV argues that firms vary in their resources and resource variances lead to varying competitive positions. Capability theories, building on earlier work by Nelson and Winter and Teece, make a similar claim.

Developing ideas pioneered by Rumelt and discussed by Levinthal and Noda and Collis. Hoopes, Madsen, and Walker use the term competitive heterogeneity to describe the performance differences between close competitors. Hoopes et al. argue that the RBV is but one of many possible explanations for competitive heterogeneity. Thus, the title of their paper and special issue, "Why is there a RBV?" In addition to economics-based explanations noted above, Hoopes et al. point out that differing beliefs, preferences, and objectives lead firms pursuing similar customers to find and develop unique competitive positions.

Additionally, Hoopes, et al. suggest that competitive advantage should be thought of in terms of each firm's economic contribution. Termed the V-C model, it is basically a bargaining model (see Tirole) over the surplus created by a firm's activities. A buyer and supplier bargain over the price (P) for a good that contributes a value (V) to the buyer and costs the supplier some amount (C) to produce. "Value is the price a buyer is willing to pay for a good absent competing products or services yet within budget constraints and considering other purchasing opportunities. Most work considers costs in terms of marginal cost. The good’s market price lies between value and cost. So, the buyer receives a surplus of value minus the price (V-P), and the supplier receives a profit of price minus cost (P-C). The supplier’s resources and capabilities, in turn, influence the value of the good to the buyer and/or the cost of producing it." Also see Besanko, Dranove & Shanley,; Ghemawat, Walker, see also Postrel. Under this theory, competitive advantage is deemed to be possessed by the firm who implements largest difference between value and cost when compared to rivals. This bargaining model has been further developed extensively in Johnson's account of economic opportunity rents underpinning heterogeneous competition.
