= VRIO =

Business analysis framework

VRIO (value, rarity, imitability, and operations) is a business analysis framework for strategic management. As a form of internal analysis, VRIO evaluates all the resources and capabilities of a firm.

VRIO is an initialism for the four question framework asked about a resource or capability to determine its competitive potential:

- The question of value: Is this resource or capability valuable to the firm?
- The question of rarity: Is control of the resource or capability limited?
- The question of imitability: Is there a significant cost disadvantage to a firm obtaining or developing the resource or capability?
- The question of organization (ability to exploit the resource or capability): "Is the firm organized, ready, and able to exploit the resource/capability?" "Is the firm organized to capture value?"

An earlier version of this framework used the acronym VRIN: value, rarity, imitability and (non)-substitutability. The VRIN format was first proposed by Jay Barney in 1991 and made available as VRIO in 1995.

== Overview ==
| Valuable? | Rare? | Costly to imitate? | Exploited by the organization? | Competitive implication |
|---|---|---|---|---|
| No | | | | Competitive disadvantage |
| Yes | No | | | Competitive parity |
| Yes | Yes | No | | Temporary competitive advantage |
| Yes | Yes | Yes | No | Unexploited competitive advantage |
| Yes | Yes | Yes | Yes | Sustained competitive advantage |

== Value ==
The question of value is whether the resource or capability is valuable to the firm, where the definition of valuable is whether the resource or capability works to exploit an opportunity or mitigate a threat in the marketplace. Generally, this exploitation of opportunity or mitigation of threat will result in an increase in revenues or a decrease in costs. Occasionally, some resources or capabilities could be considered strengths in one industry and weaknesses in a different one.

Six common examples of opportunities firms could attempt to exploit are:

- technological change,
- demographic change,
- cultural change,
- economic climate,
- specific international events,
- legal and political conditions.

Furthermore, five threats that a resource or capability could mitigate are:

- the threat of buyers,
- threat of suppliers,
- threat of entry,
- threat of rivalry,
- threat of substitutes.

The identification of possibly valuable resources or capabilities can be done by looking into a company's value chain, and whether a company's assets allows it to operate more effectively in parts of the value chain.

== Rarity ==
Having rarity in a firm can lead to competitive advantage. Rarity is when a firm has a valuable resource or capability that is absolutely unique among a set of current and potential competitors. A firm's resources and capabilities must be both short in supply and persist over time to be a source of sustained competitive advantage. If both short supply and persistence over time are not met, then the resources and capabilities a firm has cannot maintain a sustained competitive advantage. If a resource is not rare, then perfect competition dynamics are likely to be observed.

== Imitability ==
The primary question of imitability asked in the VRIO framework in internal analysis is: “Do firms without a resource or capability face a cost disadvantage in obtaining or developing it compared to firms that already possess it?”

Firms with valuable and rare resources, which are hard to imitate by other firms, can gain the first-mover advantages in the market and can hence gain competitive advantage.

A firm can either exploit an external opportunity or neutralize an external threat by using rare and valuable resources. When the firm's competitors discover this competitive advantage, either ignore the profit gained by the competitive advantage and continue to operate in their old ways or analyze and duplicate the competitive strategy of its rival. If there is little cost in obtaining the rare and valuable resource, other firms can imitate the competitive advantage to gain competitive parity. However, sometimes it is hard for other firms to get access to the resources and imitate the innovative company's strategy. As a result, innovative companies that implement strategies based on costly-to-imitate and valuable resources can gain long-term competitive advantage.

=== Forms of imitation ===
In most cases, imitation appears in two ways, direct duplication or substitution. After observing other firms’ competitive advantage, a firm can directly imitate the resource possessed by the innovative firm. If the cost to imitate is high, the competitive advantage will be sustained. If not, the competitive advantage will be temporary. Otherwise, an imitating firm can attempt to use a substitute in order to gain similar competitive advantage of the innovative firm.

=== Cost of imitation ===
Cost of imitation is usually high in order to gain a competitive advantage due to the following reasons:

- Unique Historical Conditions – an innovative firm gains low-cost access to rare resources in a particular time and space,
- Causal Ambiguity – an imitating firm cannot tell the factors that lead to the competitive advantage of an innovative firm,
- Social Complexity – when the resources involved in gaining competitive advantage is based on interpersonal relationship, culture and other social background,
- Patents – a source of long-term competitive advantage certificated by authority in a few industries such as pharmaceuticals.

== Organization ==
If a company is successfully organised, it can enjoy a period of sustained competitive advantage. Components of successful organization include, formal reporting structures, management control systems and compensation policies.

Formal reporting structures are simply a description of who in the firm reports to whom.

Management control systems include both formal and informal means to make sure that managers’ decisions align with a firm's strategies. Formal control systems can consist of budgeting and reporting activities that keep top management informed of decisions made by employee's lower down in the firm. Informal controls can include a company's culture and encouraging employees to monitor each other.

Firms incentivize their employees to behave a desired way through compensation policies. These policies can include bonuses, stocks or salary increases but can also include non-monetary incentives such as additional vacation days or a larger office.

These components of organization are known as complementary capabilities and resources because alone they do not provide much value. However, in combination with a firm's other resources and capabilities, it can result in sustained competitive advantage.

== See also ==
- PEST analysis
- SWOT analysis
- Management
- Strategic management
- Strategic planning
- System dynamics
- Resource-based view
