= Birger Wernerfelt =

Economist

Academic background
- Alma mater: University of Copenhagen (BA, MA); Harvard University (Doctorate of Business Administration; PhD)

Academic work
- Discipline: Economics; Marketing; Strategic Management
- Institutions: University of Michigan; Northwestern University; Massachusetts Institute of Technology; University of Copenhagen
- Notable ideas: Resource-based view; Adaptation-Cost Theory of the Firm

Birger Wernerfelt (born 1951) is a Danish economist and management theorist. He is the J. C. Penney Professor of Management Emeritus at the MIT Sloan School of Management at the Massachusetts Institute of Technology (MIT). He is known for his 1984 article, "A Resource-Based View of the Firm", which named and started the development of the resource-based view (RBV) in strategic management.

== Early life and education ==
Wernerfelt was born in Denmark. He studied at the University of Copenhagen, where he earned a BA in philosophy and an MA in economics. He subsequently attended Harvard University from 1974–76 and received a Doctor of Business Administration (DBA) in managerial economics.

== Academic career ==
Wernerfelt began his career as a research fellow in mathematical economics at the University of Copenhagen and then taught strategy at the University of Michigan and Northwestern before joining the MIT Sloan School of Management in 1989. He was a visiting professor of economics at the University of Copenhagen in the 2010–11 academic year.

He is married to Harvard Professor Cynthia Montgomery.

== Research ==
Wernerfelt’s work spans economics, marketing, and strategic management although he also has a few purely technical contributions. Most of his papers are single-authored and some break with the existing literature including “A Resource-Based View of the Firm”, “On the Nature and Scope of the Firm: An Adjustment-Cost Theory”, “A Rational Reconstruction of the Compromise Effect”, and “Why Should the Boss own the Assets?”.

=== Resource-based view of the firm ===
Wernerfelt is best known for his 1984 article, A Resource-Based View of the Firm, the paper argues that firms can be understood by examining their internal resources rather than their products or markets. It suggests that differences in performance arise from variations in these resources and that strategy involves developing and using them over time.

The article is widely cited and is considered an early contribution to the resource-based view of the firm.

=== Adaptation-Cost theory of the firm ===
Wernerfelt's later work examines the economic theory of the firm. In The Comparative Advantages of Firms, Markets, and Contracts (2015), he analyzes when firms, markets, or contracts are more efficient. Building on earlier work from 1997, he highlights the role of small bargaining costs, arguing that when needs are varied and frequently changing, it may be more efficient to organize work by a relational quota contract under which the worker has agreed to follow orders without negotiation but can quit at any time.

In his 2016 book, Adaptation, Specialization, and the Theory of the Firm, he links this approach with the resource-based view, presenting them as consistent frameworks.

His more recent research includes work on organizational economics, signaling, and stochastic optimization, with publications continuing into the 2020s.

== Honors and awards ==
- Gilbert A. Churchill Award for Lifetime Achievement in Marketing Research, American Marketing Association (2025)
- Fellow of the INFORMS Society for Marketing Science (2020)
- Doctor honoris causa, Copenhagen Business School (2012)
- Strategic Management Society/Wiley Prize (1994) for "A Resource-Based View of the Firm"

He has also been recognized as a Highly Cited Author by the Institute for Scientific Information (ISI) and elected a fellow of the International Academy of Management and the World Innovation Foundation.

== Selected publications ==
Wernerfelt's published articles include:

- Wernerfelt, Birger, "A resource-based view of the firm" in Strategic Management Journal 5.2 (1984): 171-180.
- Wernerfelt, Birger, "The Comparative Advantages of Firms, Markets, and Contracts: A Unified Theory", Economica 82.236 (2015): 350-67.
- Wernerfelt, Birger, "General Equilibrium with Real Time Search in Labor and Product Markets", Journal of Political Economy 96.3 (1988): 821-31.
- Simester, Duncan I., and Birger Wernerfelt, "Determinants of Asset Ownership: A Study of the Carpentry Trade", Review of Economics and Statistics 87.1 (2005): 50-58.
- Wernerfelt, Birger, "A Rational Reconstruction of the Compromise Effect: Using Market Data to Infer Utilities", Journal of Consumer Research 21.4 (1995): 627-33.
- Wernerfelt, Birger, and Cynthia A. Montgomery, "Tobin's q and the Importance of Focus in Firm Performance", American Economic Review 78.1 (1988): 246-50.
- Fornell, Claes, and Birger Wernerfelt "Defensive marketing strategy by customer complaint management: a theoretical analysis", Journal of Marketing Research 24.4 (1987): 337-346.
- Hansen, Gary S., and Birger Wernerfelt, "Determinants of firm performance: The relative importance of economic and organizational factors." Strategic Management Journal 10.5 (1989): 399-411.
- Chatterjee, Sayan, and Birger Wernerfelt, "The link between resources and type of diversification: Theory and evidence." Strategic management journal 12.1 (1991): 33-48.
- Wernerfelt, Birger, "The resource-based view of the firm: Ten years after." Strategic Management Journal 16.3 (1995): 171-174.
- Wernerfelt, Birger, “The Origin and Function of Arbitrary Signals...”, PNAS Nexus, (2024) 3, no. 9, p. 408.
- Wernerfelt, Birger, “Stochastic Differential Games and Optimization Problems with Controlled Point Process Arrivals”, Journal of Optimization Theory and Application, (2025) 206:42.
