= Co-Opertition FIRST =

2000 robotics competition

- Year: 2000

Season Information
- Number of teams: 372
- Number of regionals: 10
- Championship location: Epcot Center, Disney World

FIRST Championship Awards
- Chairman's Award winner: Team 16 - “Baxter Bomb Squad”
- Woodie Flowers Award winner: Kyle Hughes
- Founder's Award winner: Dr. William Murphy, Founder of Cordis Corporation & Small Parts, Inc.
- Champions: Team 255- "Foothill Robotics"; Team 232 - "Vintage"; Team 25 - "Raider Robotix"

Co-Opertition FIRST was the 2000 game for the FIRST Robotics Competition.

== Field ==
The playing field was a carpeted, rectangular area with two 6 ft (2 m) high goals located midfield, one goal for each alliance. There is a 30 in (762 mm) clearance bar under each goal. Between the goals is an 8 ft (2 m) wide ramp with a 5 ft (2 m) clearance bar, which robots may hang on to score points. Around the perimeter of the field are four stations for human players, who work with remote controlled robots on the field to score points. At the start of each match, each alliance station contains seven yellow balls and one black ball. Fifteen yellow balls and two black balls are located at the far end of the playing field.

== Robots ==
Each robot can weigh up to 130 lb (59 kg), and must start each match small enough to fit inside a 30" x 36" x 5' space. The robots are powered by a sealed lead-acid battery from Yuasa Exide, Inc. and use motors from S-B Power Tool Company, ITT Automotive, Keyang, Globe Motor, and Delphi Interior and Lighting. They also use speed controllers and a programmable control system supplied by FIRST. Drivers use joysticks from CH Products and switches from Honeywell to remotely control the robots via a radio link which uses RNet wireless modems from Motorola.

== Scoring ==
Each match is two minutes long. Alliances receive one point for each yellow ball and five points for each black ball in their goal, and not in contact with their robot. Robots that are completely on the ramp each earn five points for their alliance. A robot hanging from the horizontal bar connecting the two goals earns ten points for its alliance.

== "Co-Opertition" ==
The idea of Co-opertition stems from the games scoring for the qualifying matches. The winning alliance receives 3x the loser's score as their qualifying points. Thus, it is more beneficial to win a match 10-9 than 20–0.

== Events ==
All events. Legend:
Week 1
Week 2
Week 3
Week 4
Championship

The following regional events were held in 2000:

Week	Event	Location	Date	Champions
1	Kennedy Space Center Southeast Regional	Kennedy Space Center, Florida	March 9 – 11	16 Bomb Squad, 312 HeatWave, 415 RoBoCRAFT
1	Great Lakes Regional	Ypsilanti, Michigan	March 9 – 11	47 Chief Delphi, 201 The FEDS, 349 Team 349
2	Johnson & Johnson Mid-Atlantic Regional	New Brunswick, New Jersey	March 16 – 18	25 Raider Robotix, 175 Buzz Robotics, 293 SPIKE
2	NASA Langley/VCU Regional	Richmond, Virginia	March 16 – 18	67 The HOT Team, 122 NASA Knights, 281 The GreenVillains
2	Lone Star Regional	Houston, Texas	March 16 – 18	254 The Cheesy Poofs, 364 Team Fusion, 437 Talon Robotics
3	Long Island Regional	Brentwood, New York	March 23 – 25	55 Team 55, 353 POBots, 394 Team 394
3	Philadelphia Alliance Regional	Philadelphia, Pennsylvania	March 23 – 25	134 Team Discovery, 277 Team 277, 293 SPIKE
3	Motorola Midwest Regional	Evanston, Illinois	March 23 – 25	45 TechnoKats Robotics Team, 47 Chief Delphi, 111 WildStang
4	UTC New England Regional	Hartford, Connecticut	March 30 – April 1	131 CHAOS, 209 DRRT, 237 Black Magic Robotics
4	NASA Ames Regional	San Jose, California	March 30 – April 1	60 Kingman FIRST Robotics Team (The Bionic Bulldogs), 254 The Cheesy Poofs, 409 Team 409

=== Championship ===
The national championship was held at Epcot Center, Disney World, Orlando. The Championship Alliance consisted of Teams 255, 232, and Team 25. Teams 255 and 232 no longer compete.
