= Adrian Slywotzky =

American economist

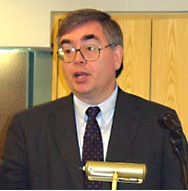
- Occupation: Economist

Adrian J. Slywotzky (born 1951 in New York City) is an American consultant of Ukrainian origin and the author of several books on economic theory and management.

== Early life and education ==
Slywotzky was born in the family of Ukrainian immigrants from the Ivano-Frankivs'k region of Ukraine. After getting his undergraduate degree at Harvard, Slywotzky also received a JD from Harvard Law School and an MBA from Harvard Business School. He has worked as a consultant since 1979 and is currently a partner at Oliver Wyman.

Slywotzky wrote several books on profitability and growth, namely the bestselling The Profit Zone. He is one of the most renowned consultants of the United States and was elected as one of the 25 best consultants in 2000 and 2008.

== Publications ==
Books

- Value Migration: How to Think Several Moves Ahead of the Competition (1995) ISBN 978-0-87584-632-3
- The Profit Zone: How Strategic Business Design Will Lead You to Tomorrow's Profits with David J. Morrison and Bob Andelmann (1998) ISBN 0-8129-2900-4
- Profit Patterns: 30 Ways to Anticipate and Profit from Strategic Forces Reshaping Your Business with David J. Morrison and Ted Moser (1999) ISBN 978-3-478-24510-4
- How Digital Is Your Business with David J. Morrison (2000) ISBN 978-0-609-60770-1
- Profit Patterns: A Field Guide with David J. Morrison (2002) ISBN 0-8129-3118-1
- The Art of Profitability (2004) ISBN 978-0-446-69227-4
- How to Grow When Markets Don't with Richard Wise (2005) ISBN 3-636-01140-5
- The Upside: From Risk Taking to Risk Shaping—How to Turn Your Greatest Threat into Your Biggest Growth Opportunity with Karl Weber (2007) ISBN 978-0-446-69227-4
- Demand: Creating What People Love Before They Know They Want It with Karl Weber (2011) ISBN 978-0-307-88732-0
