= Chris Zook =

Business writer and executive

- Born: Chris Zook
- Education: Harvard University
- Occupations: Business writer Management consulting executive
- Writing career
- Period: 2001–present
- Genre: Non-fiction
- Subject: Economics
- Notable works: Profit from the Core (2001); Beyond the Core (2004); Unstoppable (2007)

Chris Zook is a business writer and former partner at Bain & Company, leading its Global Strategy Practice. He currently resides in Amsterdam, the Netherlands and in Boston, Massachusetts. He is listed by The Times (London) as one of the world's top 50 business thinkers.

== Education ==
Zook received a B.A. in mathematics and economics from Williams College, a M.Phil. in economics from Exeter College, Oxford University, and a MPP and Ph.D in Public Policy Analysis from the Harvard Kennedy School.

== Books ==
Zook is an author of books and articles on business strategy, growth, and the importance of leadership economics, including the Profit from the Core trilogy. In 2001, he published Profit from the Core, which found that nine out of ten companies that had sustained profitable growth for a decade had focused on their core businesses, rather than diversification. The sequel, Beyond the Core, examines how companies that have fully exploited their core businesses can systematically and successfully expand beyond into related, or adjacent areas. Unstoppable completes the series and examines what to do when a previously viable growth formula of the past begins to approach its limits, and how companies can change their strategic focus and redefine their core. In 2010, Harvard Business School press published an updated version of Profit From the Core, subtitled "A Return to Growth in Turbulent Times." The updated edition describes how principles from the trilogy enabled companies to continue growing during the 2008 financial crisis.

All three books are rooted in a growth study initiated in 1990 at Bain & Company, encompassing thousands of companies worldwide. The study's findings have been continuously expanded and updated annually. A fourth book, "Repeatability," expands on the themes of the trilogy. It argues that complexity is a silent killer of profitable growth, while successful companies endure by maintaining simplicity at their core.

== Bibliography ==
- Zook, Chris (2001). Profit from the Core: Growth Strategy in an Era of Turbulence. Boston: Harvard Business School Press. ISBN 1-578-51230-1.
- Zook, Chris (2004). Beyond the Core: Expand Your Market Without Abandoning Your Roots. Boston: Harvard Business School Press. ISBN 1-578-51951-9.
- Zook, Chris (2007). Unstoppable: Finding Hidden Assets to Renew the Core and Fuel Profitable Growth. Boston: Harvard Business School Press. ISBN 978-1-422-10366-1.
- Zook, Chris (2010). Profit from the Core: Growth Strategy in an Era of Turbulence (Updated ed.). Boston: Harvard Business School Press. ISBN 978-1-422-13111-4.
- Zook, Chris (2012). Repeatability: Build Enduring Businesses for a World of Constant Change. Boston: Harvard Business School Press. ISBN 978-1-422-14330-8.
