= Peter Johnson (entrepreneur) =

British academic (born 1956)

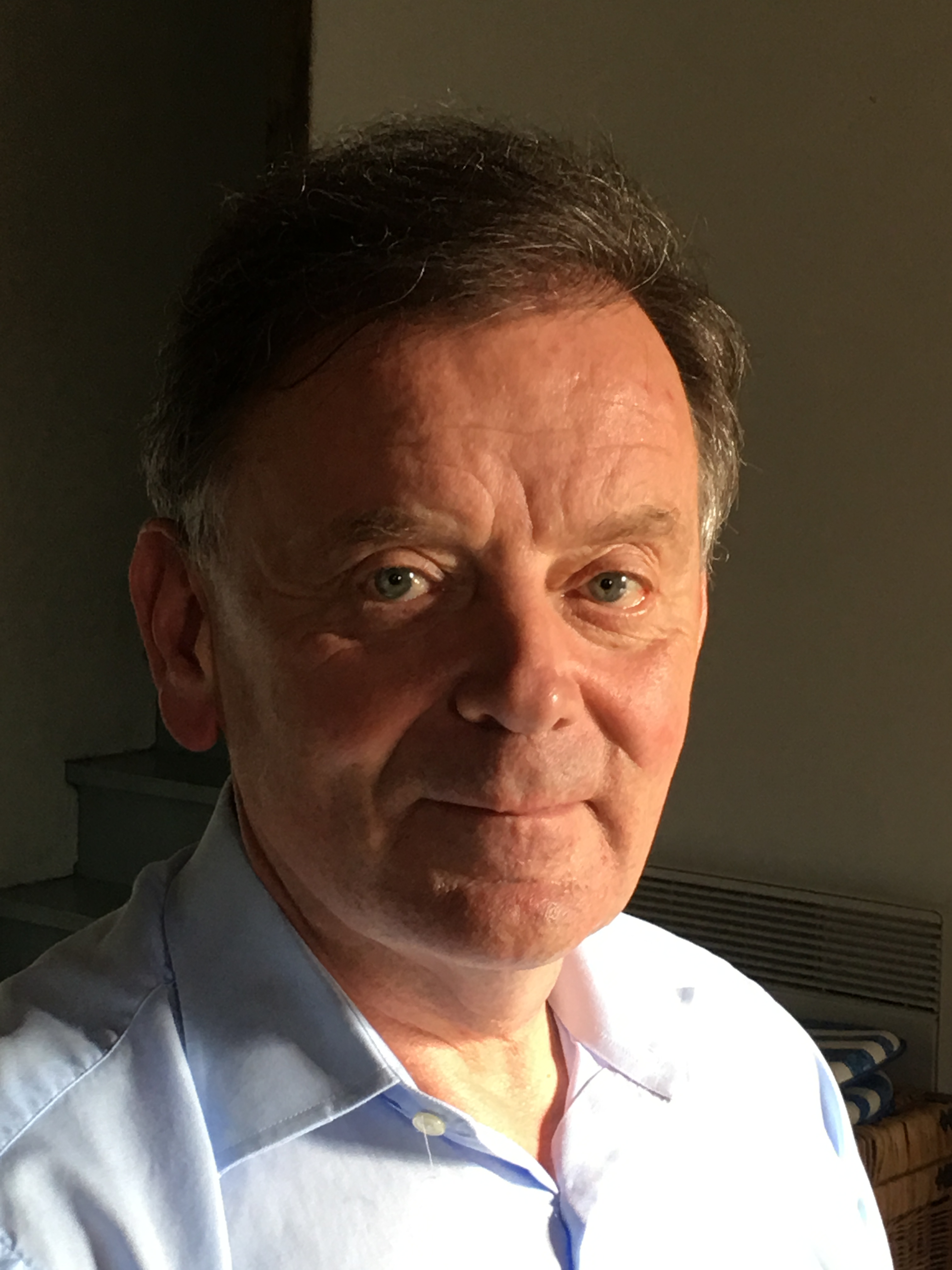
- Born: 1956 (age 69–70); York, England
- Education: MA, D Phil; MA, MBA
- Alma mater: Oxford University; Stanford University
- Employer(s): Exeter College; Oxford University
- Title: Emeritus Fellow

Peter Johnson is a British academic and entrepreneur who is the founder of Venturefest, an entrepreneurial festival. He is an Emeritus Fellow of Exeter College, Oxford. His most notable publications relate to the formal economic underpinnings of business strategy and valuation, and to the philosophical status of physical constants – such as the speed of light – in scientific theories.

== Education ==
Born in York in 1956, Johnson moved to Hertfordshire in 1962. He attended local state schools until the age of 13 when he won a Fleming Scholarship to Eton College awarded by Hertfordshire. He excelled at Eton and was appointed Captain of the Oppidans. In 1974 he won an Open Scholarship to Balliol College, Oxford, to read Physics and Philosophy under Prof. Bill Newton-Smith. In 1978 his top First Class degree, emphasising Theoretical Physics, Logic and the Philosophy of Physics, led to a Masters in the Philosophy of Science, at Stanford University in 1979.

== Career ==
=== Strategy consulting ===
Johnson became Bain and Company’s first Oxbridge associate and eighth employee in Europe in 1979. In 1981, Johnson went to Stanford Business School, graduating as an Arjay Miller Scholar and equal top student in finance. Johnson then joined LEK Consulting, an offshoot of Bain in Europe, and was the first non-founding equity partner. He founded the Paris office in 1989.

=== Academia ===
Johnson returned to Balliol College in 1993 to undertake a doctorate in the philosophy of science. In 1996 his thesis ‘The Constants of Nature’, was published by Ashgate Publishing. While pursuing his doctorate, Johnson was involved in the planning and resourcing of the Said Business School, Oxford, designing core elements of the MBA curriculum and managing external corporate relations. In 1996 he was elected Ernest Butten Fellow in Management at Balliol College. From 1996 to 1999, as the Director of Corporate Relations and acting Operations Director, Johnson worked with the Dean, John Kay, and Academic Director, Colin Mayer. Johnson also developed policy and governance initiatives including the bid for the Science Enterprise Challenge on behalf of the University. In 1999, Johnson was appointed University Lecturer (Associate Professor in US terminology) in New Business Development and Tutorial Fellow at Exeter College.

=== Entrepreneurship ===
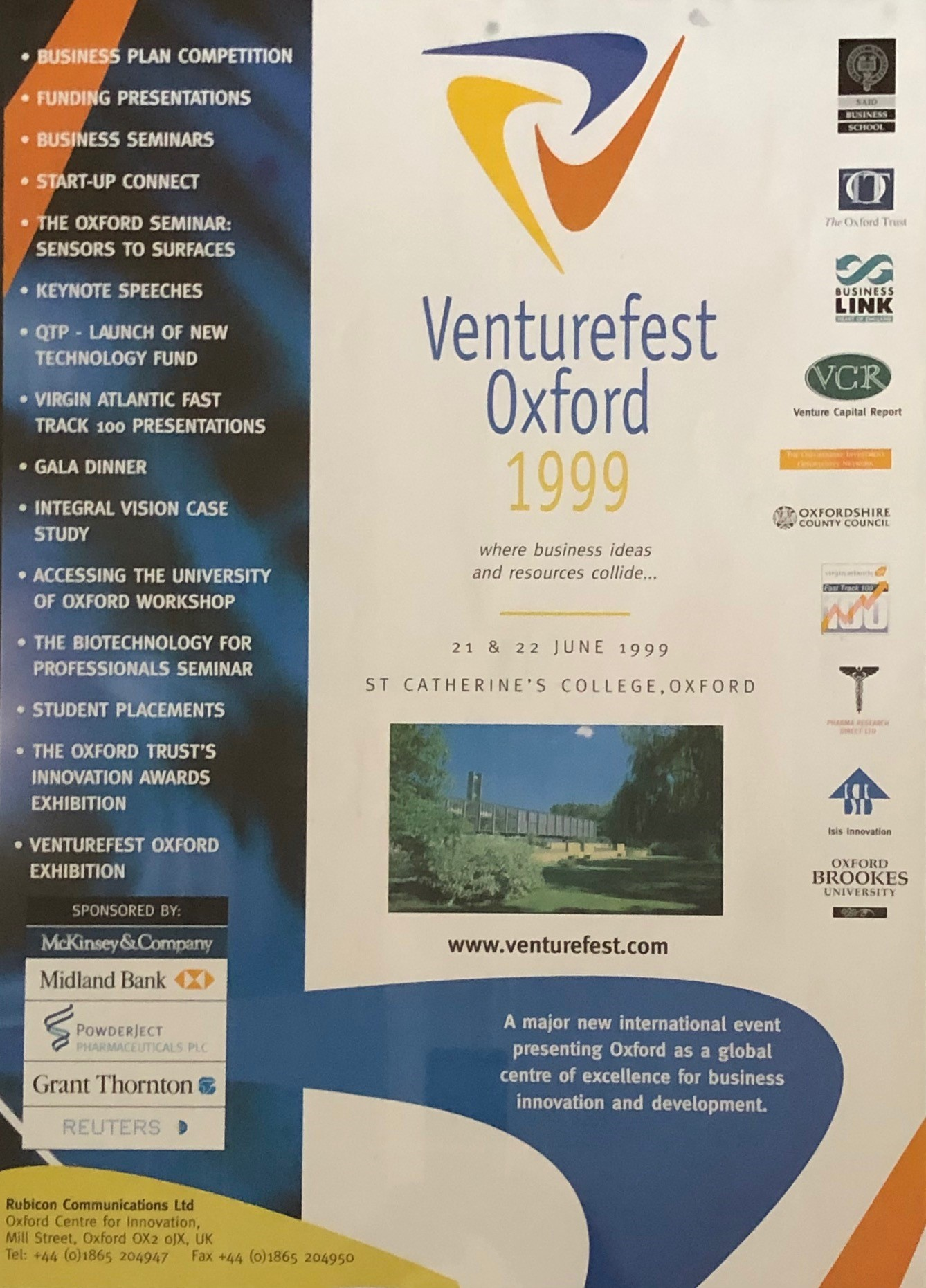
Original Venturefest 1999 Poster

Johnson taught strategy and entrepreneurship, leading him, with the help of David Sainsbury to launch an entrepreneurial festival, Venturefest, on behalf of Oxford and Brookes universities in 1999. The goal was to establish the entrepreneurial equivalent of the Cannes Film Festival. The first fair attracted over 1800 attendees over two days, helped by support from the Gatsby Charitable Foundation, Oxford County Council, IBM, Reuters, McKinsey. Such was its success in the early years that it spawned other Venturefest events in London and York, and has extended throughout England and Scotland. In setting up Venturefest, Johnson drew on his experiences as an angel investor, and as a non-executive director of university spin outs (Oxford Phosphor Systems – Opsys Ltd., and Cambridge Flat Projection Displays Ltd.), and of early-stage venture funders Egan & Talbot, and QTP in Oxford and Cambridge. He pursued further entrepreneurial engagement in an active executive role, including at Cartezia Ltd, a specialist digital business-building consultancy and incubator.

=== Investment ===
At a number of Oxford Colleges, the Finance and Investment Bursar (CFO, CIO) is chosen from the academic fellows, on a rotating basis. Johnson twice played this role at Exeter College, 2000–01, and 2004–07. He implemented major changes in investment policy, introducing a variant of Swensen’s Yale model, and establishing an external advisory committee comprising members from Apax Partners, Tudor, Adam Street, UBS, and London Business School. On a leave of absence from Exeter College 2007–9, Johnson deepened his investment acumen as an equity partner in a US hedge fund, D3 Family Fund, a small-cap equities specialist.

== Philosophy of science/physics research ==
Johnson’s book, The Constants of Nature, reprinted by Routledge in 2018, builds on earlier work concerning the ontological status of the constants that appear in physical theory by Norman Campbell, Herbert Dingle and Julio Palacios. Dingle, Mach, Bridgman and others had asserted that physical constants such as G, the gravitational constant, ε_{0} or μ_{0}, the permittivity and permeability of free space, had only a conventional status. This arose because dimensional analysis, in particular Buckingham’s π Theorem, allows any instance of a given constant to be removed, or its dimensions altered, by changing the choice of the fundamental dimensions and quantities in which the equations of physics are written. Johnson established that this conclusion was only warranted once a system for the measurement of physical quantities had been defined (which permitted multiple dimensional representations of a given physical quantity under which its dimensions might be altered, or its occurrence made superfluous). By providing a more fundamental, pre-measurement framework to define constants, using predicates and operators following the methods of axiomatic set theory, Johnson demonstrated that constants are not undermined by conventionalism, and established a realist underpinning for physical constants as architectural features within the physics that describe the universe in which we exist. Johnson then went on to explicate more generally what this notion of realism entailed, employing for the most part The Natural Ontological Attitude (NOA) as expounded by Arthur Fine.

== Finance and strategy research ==
In his early strategy research, Johnson developed alternative measures of financial performance which were robust and less prone to manipulation. In collaboration with Howard Thomas, he established that there was good statistical evidence for the use of Resource Margin Accounting (RMA), also known as the Return on Value Added (ROVA) or Return on Net Output (RONO) familiar to economists. In 2005, Johnson published Astute Competition: The Economics of Strategic Diversity, integrating the concepts, tools and theories that he had developed in his consulting work, teaching, and entrepreneurial activities. Johnson explains the competitive heterogeneity of businesses in terms of opportunity rents earned from the astute deployment of distinct business models in empirically defined strategic ecosystems.

Concerned about the fluidity and imprecision shown by those who loosely employ the term strategy in business and academic dialogue, in later work Johnson has defined formally what business strategy is and outlined a taxonomic approach to describe business models using matrices and tensors: business genomics. Emulating earlier work by Ramsay and Hotelling, in his joint paperwith Nicolai Foss, Johnson uses the calculus of variations - more generally Pontryagin’s Maximum Principle in Control Theory – to optimise the path of resource utilisation for a business pursuing an optimal strategy, proving that the optimal path ifs the shortest path in resource space in accordance with the Principle of Least Action.

Johnson has similarly addressed the concern that the concept of a business model is lacking formalisation in the current academic literature. To describe formally how the business deploys its resources, Johnson extended the matrix business model framework he introduced in Astute Competition. In a paper published in 2017, Johnson demonstrated how matrix methods may usefully be deployed to characterise the architecture of resources, costs, and revenues that a business uses to create and deliver value to customers which defines its business model. Systematisation of this technique (Johnson settles on a business genomic code of seven matrix elements of a business model) would support a taxonomical approach to empirical studies of business models in the same way that Linnaeus’ taxonomy revolutionised biology.

== Selected publications ==
=== Books and chapters ===
- Johnson, P., (2013), ‘Value-based Planning’, in Encyclopedia of Management, 3rd Ed., Vol. 13, Wiley, New Jersey.
- Johnson, P., (2013), ‘Value-based Strategy’, in Encyclopedia of Management, 3rd Ed., Vol. 13, Wiley, New Jersey.
- Johnson, P., (2007), Astute Competition – The Economics of Strategic Diversity, Elsevier, Oxford.
- Johnson, P., (2003), 'Strategy and Valuation’ in Faulkner D. O. and Campbell A. (eds.) The Oxford Handbook of Strategy, Vol. 1, OUP, Oxford.
- Johnson, P., (2000), 'Beyond EVA: Resource Margin Accounting’, in T. Dickson (ed.) Mastering Strategy, London, Pearson.
- Johnson, P., (1997), The Constants of Nature: A Realist Account, Ashgate, Aldershot; reprinted (2018), Routledge, Abingdon.

=== Key papers ===
- Johnson, P., (2017), "Business Models: Formal Description and Economic Optimisation", Managerial and Decision Economics, Vol. 38-8, 1105–1115.
- Johnson, P., Foss, N. J., (2016), "Optimal Strategy and Business Models: A Control Theory Approach", Managerial and Decision Economics, Vol. 37-7, 515–529.
- Johnson, P., Thomas, H., (2007), "Resource Margin Accounting: An Elucidation and Preliminary Empirical Testing", Management Decision, Vol. 45, No. 3, 420–433.
