= Micro-MBA =

The Micro-MBA is a learner-driven, outcomes-based entrepreneurial course based on classroom session followed by pro-active mentoring meetings. The programme aims to teach entrepreneurs, mostly in developing countries, fundamental business skills so that they can operate their businesses successfully. The term Micro-MBA refers to “Managing Business Activities” at the micro and small-business levels. The course programme focuses on teaching practical skillsabout subjects such as money management, stock control, customer handling, and marketing that can be applied in the daily business activities of the business owners. The initial 5-day classroom experience is followed by 3 months of required mentoring. At that stage, learners who have demonstrated their application of what they learned, are awarded diplomas under the authority of Trident Institute.

The Micro-MBA is offered by independent community-based trainers, as well as trainers working with training companies, universities, NGOs, NPOs, CBOs and religious organisations. Trainers courses are offered regularly on the Zoom platform. While the Micro-MBA is not formally accredited, it meets all the requirements of Unit Standard 14444 at NQF Level 1 (7 credits). The new MICRO-MBA MOBILE and BIZ-CALC Apps (for Android), make distance-learning possible. Both Apps may be downloaded free of charge from Google Play Store. Aspirant learners who sign up for the full course are allocated to a trained facilitator who ensures that learners are competent and confident as they proceed incrementally through the modules. Access to WiFi is only needed during downloading and submission of completed workbooks.The BIZ-CALC App may be used to manage the business on a weekly or monthly basis. Records of Cash-Flow, Costing and Stock Control figures may be stored indefinitely. Training organisations may utilise these records for mentorship purposes, as well as for reporting to sponsors on the progress of the fledgling businesses.

== Objective ==
The main aim of the Micro-MBA programme is to provide small business owners with basic business skills, which they can apply in their daily activities to grow and sustain their businesses. Self-employment is the only option for the greater majority of unemployed people in many emerging economies.

== History ==
The initial development of the Micro-MBA course was done by the Triple Trust Organisation in Cape Town, between 1987 and 1992. The Trident Institute offered the first Micro-MBA Trainer-Mentor course in 1991, to retrenched miners from the Mineworkers Development Agency. Since then, more than 6 500 trainers have been trained in sub-Saharan Africa and Latin America, to offer the basic Micro-MBA course to emerging entrepreneurs in their communities. The programme focuses on teaching students basic business skills in class and mentoring sessions after completing the classes at their marketplaces. The main aim of the course has been to enable small business owners to operate their businesses more successfully or to start their own business.

Since its formation more than 210 000 people have successfully completed the Micro-MBA course in sub-Saharan Africa and Latin America. The course has been offered by some 350 organisations who have had their trainers trained by Trident Institute. Various independent surveys have shown that between 67% and 81% of former programme students are still successful with their own business or are participating in the labour market 18 months after completing the course. The programme has become a successful education tool in basic economic development in South Africa and has spread to other African and Latin American and European countries. The course has been described by the London Financial Times as "Brilliantly Simple and Simply Brilliant!". The founder and CEO of Trident Institute, Cedric Buffler, won the award for Outstanding Social Entrepreneur for 2007 by the Schwab Foundation.

The advent of Mobile versions of the course has made it possible for people with Android smartphones to complete the course anywhere in the world. A trained facilitator is made available via WhatsApp or Gmail, to support learners as they progress through the workbooks.

== Admission criteria ==
Admissions criteria vary. But mostly it is generally required that participants already have an existing business or a business idea that they want to realize after the course. No specific academic qualifications are required. The most important requirements are high motivation levels and the will to apply the learning to their businesses. Interviews are conducted before choosing applicants to guarantee that they take the opportunity seriously. Implementing organisations are encouraged not to offer the course free of charge. Making even a nominal charge has been found to have a significant impact on the positive outcome of the training. Non-Profit organisations receiving sponsorships for their clients are encouraged to follow the model of charging something for the course.

Learners who wish to continue with the course submit the first workbook from the handsets. They are then allocated to a trained facilitator who keeps in touch with them via WhatsApp or Gmail and ensures that they receive the 7 subsequent workbooks incrementally, as they demonstrate their understanding of each completed workbook.

The Micro-MBA Biz-Calc App is available free of charge for 14 days from Google Play. Thereafter there is an annual fee of US$5, to enable emerging entrepreneurs to complete their Cash-Flow Management, Costing & Pricing and Stock Control calculations on the App. Records may be kept indefinitely and used for coaching and reporting purposes when required.

== Course design and structure ==
Micro-MBA is an outcomes-based, learner-driven course. The classroom learning takes about 35 hours to complete and this is followed by at least 3 months of mentoring. Facilitators are trained on the Zoom platform by Trident Institute and are typically business owners or trainers employed by community-based organisations. The facilitators have access to ample supportive materials online and are encouraged to attend subsequent sessions whenever they feel the need. Recordings of the sessions are also available online to certificated trainers. Mentoring and coaching (as opposed to baby-sitting) ensures the long-term success of the programme. The course materials are simple as e.g. workbooks and calculators. The course comprises 8 simple workbooks, which are accessible to persons with a grade 6 level of literacy:

- Market Investigation
- Business calculations on a simple calculator
- Buying
- Costing and Pricing
- Selling
- Money Management
- Stock Control

Workbooks and bookkeeping materials are available in three variants, for Traders, Producers and Service `providers. Facilitators are trained to offer all three options. Only organisations that have had their facilitators certificated by ~Trident institute are permitted to purchase training materials.

All of the above information also applies to the Micro-MBA Mobile App (for android) available on Goggle Play Store.

== See also ==
- Mini-MBA
