= Cynthia A. Montgomery =

American economist and academic

Cynthia A. Montgomery is an American economist and academic, teaching strategy and serving as the Timken Professor of Business Administration at Harvard Business School. Prior to Harvard, Montgomery was on the faculty of the University of Michigan Ross School of Business and at Northwestern's Kellogg School of Management.

== Books ==
- Montgomery, Cynthia A. The Strategist: Be the Leader Your Business Needs. New York: HarperCollins, 2012.
- Collis, David J., and Cynthia A. Montgomery. Corporate Strategy: A Resource-Based Approach. 2nd ed. Boston: McGraw-Hill/Irwin, 2005.
- Collis, D. J., and C. A. Montgomery. Corporate Strategy: Resources and the Scope of the Firm. IL: Irwin, 1997.
- Montgomery, C. A., ed. Resource-Based and Evolutionary Theories of the Firm: Towards a Synthesis. Norwell, MA: Kluwer Academic Publishers, 1995.
- Montgomery, C. A. and M. E. Porter, eds. Strategy: Seeking and Securing Competitive Advantage. Boston, MA: Harvard Business School Press, 1991.
