= Risk transformation =

Risk transformation is about how to mitigate risk and in parallel develop competitive advantages. The goals of risk transformation are first to combat risk and secondly to differentiate and create solutions for the benefits of clients/users. Risk may include financial risk, security/safety-related risks, uncertainty, and risk through action or lack of action.

Variance Management Transformation: Variance management involves managing the difference between actual performance and the standard (Montgomery, 2009). This is done by identifying the potential variance (gap) and finding solutions in case the variance occurs. Operational variances can be avoided, whereas key variances can be managed (Bednar, 2020, p. 80). Both types of variance can be viewed as risk; understanding how to manage the risk will ease uncertainty. True variance management solutions can have a positive impact if the variance occurs.

== Roles ==
Risk transformation is relevant in many areas, such as:

- Regulatory risks, involving compliance or lack of compliance
- Risk related to management and operations
- Organizational risk
- Project management risk
- Systems implementation and technical support risks
- Strategy risk, related to strategy development and execution, or lack of strategy
- Functional risks, such as within sales/marketing, logistics, production, and finance
- Security/safety risks, including attacks related to terror, criminals and attacks on countries and organisations from other nations
