= Resource-based view =

Strategic management theory

The resource-based view (RBV), often referred to as the "resource-based view of the firm", is a managerial framework used to determine the strategic resources a firm can exploit to achieve sustainable competitive advantage.

Jay Barney's 1991 article "Firm Resources and Sustained Competitive Advantage" is widely cited as a pivotal work in the emergence of the resource-based view, although some scholars (see below) argue that there was evidence for a fragmentary resource-based theory from the 1930s. RBV proposes that firms are heterogeneous because they possess heterogeneous resources, meaning that firms can adopt differing strategies because they have different resource mixes.

The RBV focuses managerial attention on the firm's internal resources in an effort to identify those assets, capabilities and competencies with the potential to deliver superior competitive advantages.

== Origins and background ==
During the 1990s, the resource-based view (also known as the resource-advantage theory) of the firm became the dominant paradigm in strategic planning. RBV can be seen as a reaction against the positioning school and its somewhat prescriptive approach which focused managerial attention on external considerations, notably industry structure. The so-called positioning school had dominated the discipline throughout the 1980s. In contrast, the resource-based view argued that sustainable competitive advantage derives from developing superior capabilities and resources. Jay Barney's 1991 article, "Firm Resources and Sustained Competitive Advantage", is seen as pivotal in the emergence of the resource-based view.

A number of scholars point out that a fragmentary resource-based perspective was evident from the 1930s, noting that Barney was heavily influenced by Wernerfelt's earlier work which introduced the idea of resource position barriers being roughly analogous to entry barriers in the positioning school. Other scholars suggest that the resource-based view represents a new paradigm, albeit with roots in "Ricardian and Penrosian economic theories according to which firms can earn sustainable supranormal returns if, and only if, they have superior resources and those resources are protected by some form of isolating mechanism precluding their diffusion throughout the industry." While its exact influence is debated, Edith Penrose's 1959 book The Theory of the Growth of the Firm is held by two scholars of strategy to state many concepts that would later influence the modern resource-based theory of the firm.

The resource-based view is an interdisciplinary approach, in that it was developed within the disciplines of economics, ethics, law, management, marketing, supply chain management and general business. It represents a substantial shift in thinking, focussing attention on an organisation's internal resources as a means of organising processes and obtaining a competitive advantage. Barney stated that for resources to hold potential as sources of sustainable competitive advantage, they should be valuable, rare, imperfectly imitable and not substitutable (now generally known as VRIN criteria). The resource-based view suggests that organisations must develop unique, firm-specific core competencies that will allow them to outperform competitors by doing things differently.

Although the literature presents many different ideas around the concept of the resource-advantage perspective, at its heart, the common theme is that the firm's resources are financial, legal, human, organisational, informational and relational; resources are heterogeneous and imperfectly mobile and that management's key task is to understand and organise resources for sustainable competitive advantage. Key theorists who have contributed to the development of a coherent body of literature include Birger Wernerfelt, Jay B. Barney, George S. Day, Gary Hamel, Shelby D. Hunt, G. Hooley and C.K. Prahalad.

== Concept ==
Achieving a sustainable competitive advantage lies at the heart of much of the literature in strategic management and strategic marketing. The resource-based view offers strategists a means of evaluating potential factors that can be deployed to confer a competitive edge. A key insight arising from the resource-based view is that not all resources are of equal importance, nor do they possess the potential to become a source of sustainable competitive advantage. The sustainability of any competitive advantage depends on the extent to which resources can be imitated or substituted. Barney and others point out that understanding the causal relationship between the sources of advantage and successful strategies can be very difficult in practice. Thus, a great deal of managerial effort must be invested in identifying, understanding and classifying core competencies. In addition, management must invest in organisational learning to develop, nurture and maintain key resources and competencies.

In the resource-based view, strategists select the strategy or competitive position that best exploits the internal resources and capabilities relative to external opportunities. Given that strategic resources represent a complex network of inter-related assets and capabilities, organisations can adopt many possible competitive positions. Although scholars debate the precise categories of competitive positions that are used, there is general agreement, within the literature, that the resource-based view is much more flexible than Porter's prescriptive approach to strategy formulation.

The key managerial tasks are:

1. Identify the firm's potential key resources.
2. Evaluate whether these resources fulfill the following criteria (also known as VRIN criteria):
  - Valuable - they enable a firm to implement strategies that improve its efficiency and effectiveness.
  - Rare - not available to other competitors.
  - Imperfectly imitable - not easily implemented by others.
  - Non-substitutable - not able to be replaced by some other non-rare resource.
3. Develop, nurture and protect resources that pass these evaluations.

== Definitions ==
Given the centrality of resources in terms of conferring competitive advantage, the management and marketing literature carefully defines and classifies resources and capabilities.

=== Resources ===
Barney defines firm resources as: "all assets, capabilities, organizational processes, firm attributes, information, knowledge, etc. controlled by a firm that enable the firm to conceive of and implement strategies that improve its efficiency and effectiveness"

=== Capabilities ===
Capabilities are "a special type of resource, specifically an organizationally embedded non-transferable firm-specific resource whose purpose is to improve the productivity of the other resources possessed by the firm."

=== Competitive advantage ===
Barney defined a competitive advantage as "when [a firm] is able to implement a value creating strategy not simultaneously being implemented by any current or potential competitors."

=== Classification of resources and capabilities ===
Firm-based resources may be tangible or intangible.

Tangible resources include: physical assets such as financial resources and human resources including real estate, raw materials machinery, plant, inventory, brands, patents and trademarks and cash.

Intangible resources may be embedded in organisational routines or practices such as an organization's reputation, culture, knowledge or know-how, accumulated experience, relationships with customers, suppliers or other key stakeholders.

Resources and capabilities may also be intraorganizational or interorganizational:

While RBV scholars have traditionally focused on intraorganizational resources and capabilities, some research points to the importance of interorganizational routines. Routines between organizations and the ability to manage interorganizational relationships can improve performance. Such collaboration capabilities are, in particular, supported by contract design capabilities.

The resources are divided into two critical assumptions:

Heterogeneous: It is the assumption that each company has different skills, capabilities, structure, resources and that makes each company different. Due to the different forms of employment and amount of resources, organizations can design different strategies that promote competitiveness in the market.
Immobile: It is the assumption that is based on the resources that an organization owns are not mobile, in other words, at least in short terms, cannot be transferred from one company to another. Companies can hardly obtain the immobile resources of their competitors since those resources have an important value for companies.

== RBV and strategy formulation ==
Firms in possession of a resource, or mix of resources that are rare among competitors, are said to have a comparative advantage. This comparative advantage enables firms to produce marketing offerings that are either (a) perceived as having superior value or (b) can be produced at lower costs. Therefore, a comparative advantage in resources can lead to a competitive advantage in market position.

In the resource-based view, strategists select the strategy or competitive position that best exploits the internal resources and capabilities relative to external opportunities. Given that strategic resources represent a complex network of inter-related assets and capabilities, organisations can adopt many possible competitive positions. Although scholars debate the precise categories of competitive positions that are used, there is general agreement, within the literature, that the resource-based view is much more flexible than Porter's prescriptive approach to strategy formulation. Hooley et al. suggest the following classification of competitive positions:

- Price positioning
- Quality positioning
- Innovation positioning
- Service positioning
- Benefit positioning
- Tailored positioning (one-to-one marketing)

== Value-based view of strategy ==
In addition to the resource-based views, value-based views provide an additional way to create organizational management links between employees at a company, based on their core values and beliefs.

The steps to a values-based view of strategy are:

- Fundamental Values or Beliefs
- Design Management Practices That Reflect and Embody These Values
- Use These to Build Core Capabilities
- Invent a Strategy That is Consistent with the Values and Uses the Capabilities to Compete in New and Unusual Ways
- Senior Management's role

The main reason for these alternate steps to view strategy is to provide a method that concentrates on the values of management practices, rather than simply resourced-based strategy.

== Criticisms ==
A number of criticisms of RBV have been widely cited, and are as follows:

- The RBV is tautological
- Different resource configurations can generate the same value for firms and thus would not be competitive advantage
- The role of product markets is underdeveloped in the argument
- The theory has limited prescriptive implications.

Other criticisms include:

- The failure to consider factors surrounding resources; that is, an assumption that they simply exist, rather than a critical investigation of how key capabilities are acquired or developed.
- It is difficult (if not impossible) to identify a resource which satisfies all of Barney's VRIN criteria or estimate how it alone affects firm performance.
- An assumption that a firm can be profitable in a highly competitive market as long as it can exploit advantageous resources does not always hold true. It ignores external factors concerning the industry as a whole; Porter's Industry Structure Analysis ought also be considered.
- The emphasis put on economic value-added, leads firms that would follow the VRIN/VRIO framework to unsustainable practices.

== See also ==
- Core competencies
- Marketing strategy
- Porter's Five Forces
- Strategic management
- VRIO
