= Delwyn Clark =

New Zealand strategic management academic

- Born: Delwyn N. Clark
- Education: University of Auckland; University of Waikato
- Occupation: Strategic management academic
- Scientific career
- Thesis: The role of MS/OR in strategic management : a NZ/UK comparative evaluation (1994)

Delwyn N. Clark is a New Zealand strategic management academic. She is a life member and past president of the Australian and New Zealand Academy of Management.

== Academic career ==
After being an undergraduate at the University of Auckland, Clark moved to the University of Waikato for a PhD thesis entitled "The role of MS/OR in strategic management : a NZ/UK comparative evaluation" on management systems and operations research.

== Selected works ==
- Barney, Jay B., and Delwyn N. Clark. Resource-based theory: Creating and sustaining competitive advantage. Oxford University Press on Demand, 2007.
- Clark, Delwyn N., and Jenny L. Gibb. "Virtual team learning: An introductory study team exercise." Journal of Management Education 30, no. 6 (2006): 765–787.
