= Gary Hamel =

American management consultant (born 1954)

Gary P. Hamel
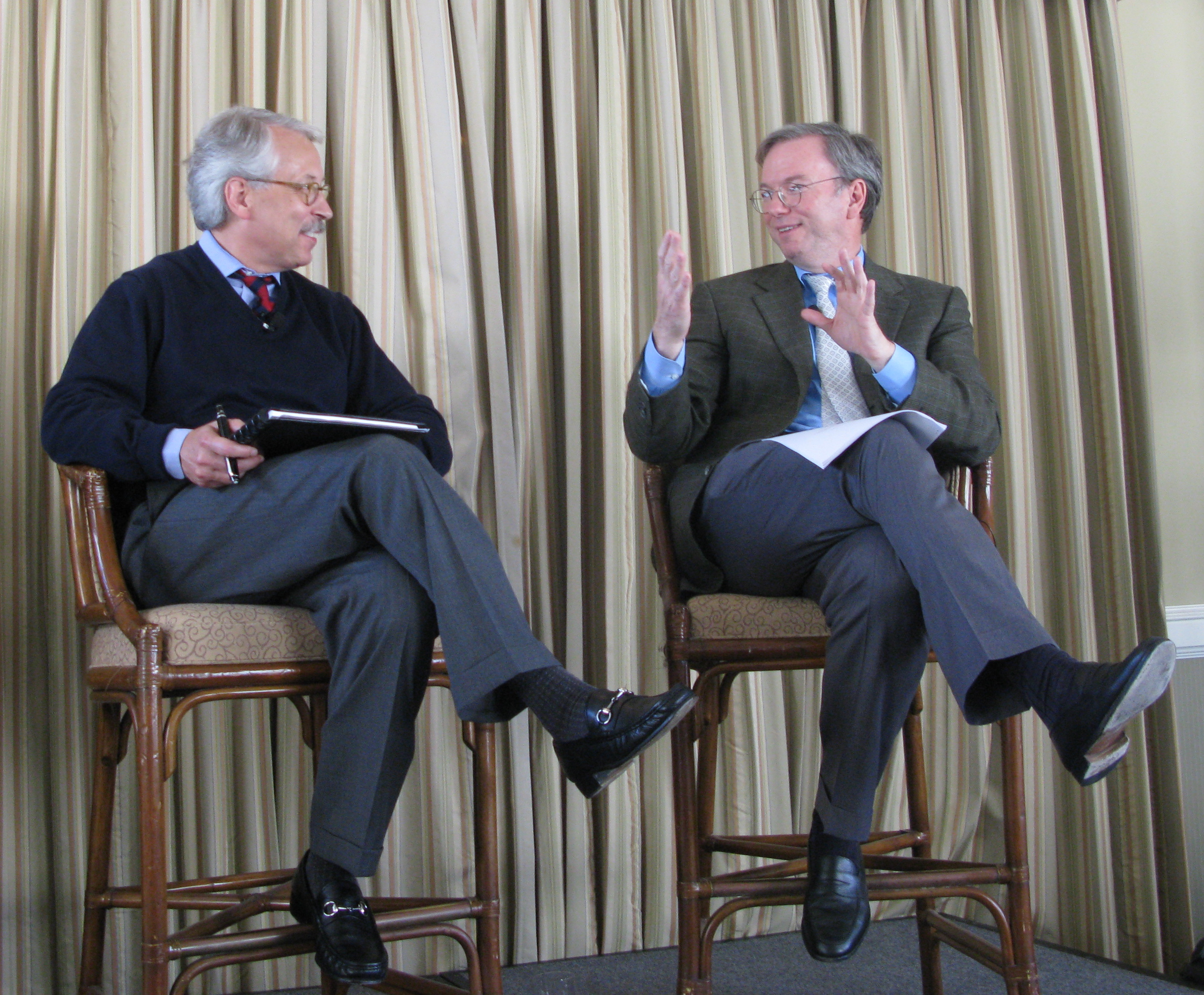
- Gary Hamel (left) interviews Eric Schmidt (right)
- Born: November 9, 1954 (age 71); St. Joseph, Michigan, US
- Education: University of Michigan
- Occupations: Author, professional speaker, management consultant
- Website: garyhamel.com

Gary P. Hamel (born November 9, 1954) is an American management consultant. He is a founder of Strategos, an international management consulting firm based in Chicago.

== Education ==
Hamel was born on November 9, 1954, in St. Joseph, Michigan. He graduated from Andrews University in 1975, and from Ross School of Business at the University of Michigan in 1990.

== Career ==
Hamel has worked as a visiting professor of international business at the University of Michigan and at Harvard Business School; he currently teaches as a visiting professor of strategic management at the London Business School where he has been working for three decades.

== Work ==
Gary Hamel is the originator (with C.K. Prahalad) of the concept of core competencies. He is also the director of the Woodside Institute, a nonprofit research foundation based in Woodside, California. He was a founder of the consulting firm Strategos in 1995, serving as chairman until 2003. The UTEK Corporation acquired Strategos in 2008 in an all-stock transaction as reported by the SEC. In 2012 Strategos became an independent strategy and innovation consultancy once again through a management buy-out.

Hamel and Prahalad introduced the idea of "strategic intent" in a 1989 article published in the Harvard Business Review. The idea of "strategic intent" embraces three attributes: direction, discovery and destiny.

Harvard Business Review has available 20 articles by Gary Hamel and Hamel books are available in 25 languages. The Wall Street Journal ranked Gary Hamel as one of the world's most influential business thinkers, and Fortune magazine has called him "the world's leading expert on business strategy" and Financial Times referred him as a ''management innovator without peer" In 2013, his name was not present on an updated version of the Wall Street Journal list. He is also a member of the Reliance Innovation Council formed by Reliance Industries Limited, India. As stated by Forbes Hamel ranked number 5 in the 10 most influential business gurus for 2007.

== Books ==
- Humanocracy (2020)
- What Matters Now (2012)
- The Future of Management (2007)
- Leading The Revolution (2000)
- Competing For the Future (1994)
