= Core competency =

Management concept of identifying the basis of competitiveness in an industry

A core competency is a concept in management theory introduced by C. K. Prahalad and Gary Hamel. It can be defined as "a harmonized combination of multiple resources and skills that distinguish a firm in the marketplace" and therefore is the foundation of companies' competitiveness.

Core competencies fulfill three criteria:

1. Can be leveraged to define new opportunities and provide potential access to a wide variety of markets.
2. Should make a significant contribution to the perceived customer benefits of the end product or service.
3. Should be difficult to imitate by competitors and provide a sustainable competitive advantage.

For example, a company's core competencies may include precision mechanics, fine optics, and micro-electronics. These help it build cameras, but may also be useful in making other products that require these competencies.

== Background ==
A core competency results from a specific set of skills or production techniques that deliver additional value to the customer. These enable an organization to access a wide variety of markets.

In a 1990 article titled "The Core Competence of the Corporation", C. K. Prahalad and Gary Hamel illustrated that core competencies lead to the development of core products, which can further be used to build many other products for end users. Core competencies are developed through the process of continuous improvements over the period of time rather than a single large change. To succeed in an emerging global market, it is more important and required to build core competencies rather than to do vertical integration. For example, NEC utilized its portfolio of core competencies to dominate the semiconductor, telecommunications, and consumer electronics market.

The use and understanding of the concept of core competences can be very important to enterprises. They can use core competences in order to excel at the contrivance of core products. Enterprises could also use core competences to raise the value created for customers and other stakeholders. The idea that firms can possess and exploit, and even possibly build, abilities that provide a source of sustained competitive advantage is also seen in the resource-based view and the dynamic capabilities view. In the former case, the core competences are labeled strategic assets, and characterized by their value, inimitability, rarity, non-substitutability, and appropriability. Contrasts to these concepts also exist, where core competences become core rigidities and strategic assets become strategic liabilities, each leading to competitive disadvantage.

Alexander and Martin (2013) state that the competitiveness of a company is based on the ability to develop core competences. A core competence is, for example, a specialised knowledge, technique, or skill. The core capability is the management ability to develop, out of the core competences, core products and new business. Competence building is, therefore, an outcome of strategic architecture which must be enforced by top management in order to exploit its full capacity.

Importantly, according to C. K. Prahalad and Gary Hamel (1990) definition, core competencies are the "collective learning across the corporation". They can, therefore, not be applied to the SBU (strategic business unit) and represent resource combination steered from the corporate level. Because the term "core competence" is often confused with "something a company is particularly good at", some caution should be taken not to dilute the original meaning.

In Competing for the Future, the authors C. K. Prahalad and Gary Hamel show how executives can develop the industry foresight necessary to adapt to industry changes and discover ways of controlling resources that will enable the company to attain goals despite any constraints. Executives should develop a point of view on which core competencies can be built for the future to revitalize the process of new business creation. Developing an independent point of view of tomorrow's opportunities and building capabilities that exploit them is the key to future industry leadership.

For an organization to be competitive, it needs not only tangible resources but intangible resources like core competences that are difficult and challenging to achieve. It is critical to manage and enhance the competences in response to industry changes in the future. For example, Microsoft has expertise in many IT based innovations where, for a variety of reasons, it is difficult for competitors to replicate or compete with Microsoft's core competences.

In a race to achieve cost cutting, quality, and productivity, most executives do not spend their time developing a corporate view of the future because this exercise demands high intellectual energy and commitment. The difficult questions may challenge their own ability to view the future opportunities but an attempt to find their answers will lead towards organizational benefits.

== Core competencies and product development ==
Core competencies are related to a firm's product portfolio via core products. Prahalad and Hamel (1990) defined core competencies as the engines for the development of core products and services. Competencies are the roots of which the corporation grows, like a tree whose fruit are end products.

Core products contribute "to the competitiveness of a wide range of end products. They are the physical embodiment of core competencies." Approaches for identifying product portfolios with respect to core competencies and vice versa have been developed in recent years. One approach for identifying core competencies with respect to a product portfolio has been proposed by Danilovic & Leisner (2007). They use design structure matrices for mapping competencies to specific products in the product portfolio. Using their approach, clusters of competencies can be aggregated to core competencies. Bonjour & Micaelli (2010) introduced a similar method for assessing how far a company has achieved its development of core competencies. More recently Hein et al. link core competencies to Christensen's concept of capabilities, which is defined as resources, processes, and priorities. Furthermore, they present a method to evaluate different product architectures with respect to their contribution to the development of core competencies.

== See also ==
- Resource-based view
- Core business
- Competitive advantage
