= Coopetition =

Neologism for cooperative competition

Coopetition (also spelled co-opetition, coopertition or co-opertition) is a concept in which firms or individuals engage in both cooperation and competition simultaneously. It describes situations where competing entities work together toward a common goal or share resources while still maintaining competitive interests in other areas. The term is a portmanteau of "cooperation" and "competition".

In business strategy, coopetition can involve companies collaborating in areas like research and development, standard-setting, or supply chain management—while competing in product offerings or market share. For example, two technology firms might jointly develop a new platform standard while continuing to compete in the end-user market. Coopetition can occur at both the inter-organizational level, where companies partner with competitors, and the intra-organizational level, where departments or teams within the same organization both collaborate and compete for resources or influence.

The concept is rooted in game theory, particularly in models that go beyond purely competitive (non-cooperative) or purely collaborative games. Foundational ideas were introduced in the 1944 book Theory of Games and Economic Behavior by John von Neumann and Oskar Morgenstern, and further developed in the work of John Forbes Nash.

== Overview ==
The concept and term coopetition and its variants have been re-coined several times in history.

The concept appeared as early as 1913, being used to describe the relationships among proximate independent dealers of the Sealshipt Oyster System, who were instructed to cooperate for the benefit of the system while competing with each other for customers in the same city.

=== Inter-organizational ===
The term and the ideas around co-opetition gained wide attention within the business community after the publication in 1996 of the book by Brandenberger and Nalebuff bearing the same title. Until today this remains the reference work for both researchers and practitioners alike.

Giovanni Battista Dagnino and Giovanna Padula's conceptualized in their conference paper (2002) that, at the inter-organisational level, coopetition occurs when companies interact with partial congruence of interests. They cooperate with each other to reach a higher value creation, if compared to the value created without interaction, and struggle to achieve a competitive advantage.

Often coopetition takes place when companies that are in the same market work together in the exploration of knowledge and research of new products, at the same time that they compete for the market-share of their products and in the exploitation of the knowledge created. In this case, the interactions occur simultaneously and in different levels in the value chain. This is the case in the arrangement between PSA Peugeot Citroën and Toyota to share components for a new city car—simultaneously sold as the Peugeot 107, the Toyota Aygo, and the Citroën C1, where companies save money on shared costs while remaining fiercely competitive in other areas.

Several advantages can be foreseen, such as cost reductions, resources complementarity and technological transfer. Some difficulties also exist, such as distribution of control, equity in risk, complementary needs and trust.

It is possible for more than two companies to be involved in coopetition with one another. Another possible case for coopetition is joint resource management in construction. Sadegh Asgari and his colleagues (2013) present a short-term partnering case in which construction contractors form an alliance, agreeing to put all or some of their resources in a joint pool for a fixed duration of time and to allocate the group resources using a more cost-effective plan.

Marcello Mariani (2007) examined that in practice policy makers and regulators can trigger, promote, and affect coopetitive interactions among economic actors that did not intentionally plan to coopete before the external institutional stakeholders (i.e., a policy maker or regulator) created the conditions for the emergence of coopetition.

Sadegh Asgari, Abbas Afshar and Kaveh Madani (2014) suggested cooperative game theory as the basis for fair and efficient allocation of the incremental benefits of cooperation among the cooperating contractors. Their study introduced a new paradigm in construction resource planning and allocation. Contractors no longer see each other as just competitors; they look for cooperation beyond their competition in order to reduce their costs.

Power differences between involved firms may lead to competition becoming dominant, whereas shared interests push the relationship toward favouring cooperation.

=== Intra-organizational ===
At the intra-organizational level, coopetition occurs between individuals or functional units within the same organization. Based on game theory and social interdependence theories, some studies investigate the presence of simultaneous cooperation and competition among functional units, the antecedents of coopetition, and its impact on knowledge sharing behaviors. For example, the concept of coopetitive knowledge sharing is developed to explain mechanisms through which coopetition influences effective knowledge sharing practices in cross-functional teams. The underlying argument is that while organizational teams need to cooperate, they are likely to experience tension caused by diverse professional philosophies and competing goals from different cross-functional representatives.

== Examples ==
- In 1913 by the Sealshipt Oyster System
- In 1937 by Rockwell D. Hunt
- Around 1975 by Doug Chamberlin in a class at Adrian College, responding to an instructor's request for an appropriate new word with which to refer to "conflict over how to divide up the benefits produced by cooperation". Incorporated in 1981 college textbook Thinking About Politics: American Government in Associational Perspective (N.Y: D. Van Nostrand, 1981), chapter 9, p. 257.
- In the decade of the 1980s, V. Frank Asaro wrote and circulated his 314-page non-fiction work Between Order and Chaos is Coopetition, a.k.a. Balance Between Order and Chaos, which culminated in a letter from best-selling author Spencer Johnson dated February 9, 1990, urging its publication. This resulted in the later publication of Universal Co-opetition; The Tortoise Shell Game, a novelization of co-opetition; and the non-fiction A Primal Wisdom (2014), corollary to the novel. (2nd. Ed., Finalist 2015 USA Best Book Awards for nonfiction and philosophy.)
- Around 1992 by Raymond Noorda to characterize Novell's business strategy.
- In 1995, Daniel Ervin, CEO of Phoenix Fire Inc., which is an international business development agency that focuses on building business partner channels for technology companies, started using the word Coopertition to describe the approach of creating a partnership between two or more competing software vendors. This type of partnership enables vendors with nominal overlap in their solution portfolio to quickly gain more market share together than when they are operating apart.
- In 2000, FIRST Robotics Competition had a competition game titled Co-Opertition FIRST. In 2009, FIRST cofounder Dean Kamen received a patent titled "Method for Creating Coopertition" (spelled as one word, with no hyphen), which involves giving FIRST Robotics teams some points scored by other teams, to encourage cooperation even as they compete. US FIRST now claims a trademark on the term on its Web site.
- In the mid-2000s, "coopetition" began to be used by Darrell Waltrip to describe the phenomenon of drivers cooperating at various phases of a race at "high speed" tracks such as Daytona and Talladaga where cooperative aerodynamic drafting is critical to a driver's ability to advance through the field. The ultimate goal for each driver, however, is to use the strategy to win.
- One of the examples of coopetition in practice in high technology context is the collaborative joint venture formed by Samsung Electronics and Sony formed in 2004 for the development and manufacturing of flat-screen LCD Panels. Coopetition is becoming more critical in high technology contexts because of several challenges such as shrinking product life cycles, need for heavy investments in research and development, convergence of multiple technologies, and importance of technological standards. While it is quite challenging to engage in coopetition (or cooperate with a competitor), coopetition engagements are helpful for firms to address major technological challenges, to create benefits for partnering firms, and to advance technological innovations that benefit the firms, the industry, and consumers.
- In 2009, the importance of coopetition was emphasized for Small and Medium-Sized Enterprises (SMEs). As technological battles intensify and technologies become more complex, SMEs face numerous challenges such as rising R&D costs, high risk and uncertainty in technological development, and lack of resources to pursue large-scale innovation projects. SMEs can more effectively deal with these problems if they work together by combining their own resources and expertise and develop their collective ability so that they can compete effectively with large firms and advance technologies they may not be able to advance alone.
- In 2012 and 2013, the concept of 'Coopetitive Knowledge Sharing' was inspired by inter-organization research literature toward developing a Coopetitive Model of Knowledge Sharing that explains (1) how coopetition should be conceptualized, (2) What forms coopetition (three formative constructs of outcome (goal, reward), means (task related), boundary (friendship, geographical closeness, sense of team belonging) interdependencies), and (3) How coopetition and its interrelated components interact and influence knowledge sharing behaviors in cross-functional software teams. This series of publications in the Journal of Systems and Software and Information Processing & Management conceptualize and operationalize the multi-dimensional construct of cross-functional coopetition, and present an instrument for measuring this construct. Cross-functional coopetition is conceptualized with five distinct and independent constructs, three of them are related to cross-functional cooperation (task orientation, communication, interpersonal relationships), and two are associated with cross-functional competition (tangible resources and intangible resources).
- In 2013 Compassion Games International, an activity of the Charter for Compassion, used "coopetition" to describe their annual games between cities about who can commit the most acts of kindness and compassion.
- In 2014 the Caring Citizens' Congress, an Empathy Surplus Project, used "coopetition" to describe how to create "compassion primaries," where candidates for party office try to find allies in the other parties to cooperate around advancing freedom, compassion and human rights as governing principles.

== See also ==
- Competitive altruism
- Frenemy
- Cartels are not an example of coopetition because their goal is to limit competition, and the goal of coopetition is to take advantage of the complementary resources of the firms in order to reach lower costs and manage new innovation possibilities, still regarding competition in a further moment.
- Negarchy
- Co-Opertition FIRST
- Philosophy of FIRST
- Cooperative board game § Cooperation and its variations
