= Competitive advantage =

Attribute that allows an organization to outperform its competitors

In business, a competitive advantage is an attribute that allows an organization to outperform its competitors.

A competitive advantage may include access to natural resources, such as high-grade ores or a low-cost power source; highly skilled labor; geographic location; high entry barriers; and access to new technology and proprietary information.

== Overview ==
The term competitive advantage refers to the ability gained through attributes and resources to perform at a higher level than others in the same industry or market (Christensen and Fahey 1984, Kay 1994, Porter 1980 cited by Chacarbaghi and Lynch 1999, p. 45). The study of this advantage has attracted profound research interest due to contemporary issues regarding superior performance levels of firms in today's competitive market. "A firm is said to have a competitive advantage when it is implementing a value creating strategy not simultaneously being implemented by any current or potential player" (Barney 1991 cited by Clulow et al.2003, p. 221).

Competitive advantage is the leverage a business has over its competitors. This can be gained by offering clients better and greater value. Advertising products or services with lower prices or higher quality piques the interest of consumers. This is the reason behind brand loyalty, or why customers prefer one particular product or service over another. Value proposition is important when understanding competitive advantage. If the value proposition is effective, that is, if the value proposition offers clients better and greater value, it can produce a competitive advantage in either the product or service.

Competitive strategy is defined as the long-term plan of a particular company to gain a competitive advantage over its competitors in the industry. It is aimed at creating a defensive position in an industry and generating a superior ROI (return on investment).

American academic Michael Porter defined two ways in which an organization can achieve competitive advantage over its rivals: a cost advantage and a differentiation advantage. A cost advantage arises when a business can provide the same products and services as its competitors but at a lower cost. A differentiation advantage arises when a business can provide different products and services from its competitors which are more closely aligned to customers' needs. In Porter's view, strategic management should be concerned with building and sustaining competitive advantage.

Competitive advantage seeks to address some of the criticisms of comparative advantage. Competitive advantage rests on the notion that cheap labor is ubiquitous and natural resources are not necessary for a good economy. The other theory, comparative advantage, can lead countries to specialize in exporting primary goods and raw materials that trap countries in low-wage economies due to terms of trade. Competitive advantage attempts to correct this issue by stressing on maximizing scale economies in goods and services that garner premium prices (Stutz and Warf 2009).

Successfully implemented strategies will lift a firm to superior performance by facilitating the firm with competitive advantage to outperform current or potential players (Passemard and Calantone 2000, p. 18). To gain competitive advantage, a business strategy of a firm manipulates the various resources over which it has direct control, and these resources have the ability to generate competitive advantage (Reed and Fillippi 1990 cited by Rijamampianina 2003, p. 362). Superior performance outcomes and superiority in production resources reflect competitive advantage (Day and Wesley 1988 cited by Lau 2002, p. 125).

The quotes above signify competitive advantage as the ability to stay ahead of present or potential competition. Also, it provides the understanding that resources held by a firm and the business strategy will have a profound impact on generating competitive advantage. Powell (2001, p. 132) views business strategy as the tool that manipulates resources and creates competitive advantage. Hence, a viable business strategy may not be adequate unless it possesses control over unique resources that have the ability to create such a relatively unique advantage.

Johnson and Foss have provided a formal account of what constitutes an optimal business strategy. According to well-established variational methods, a business pursuing an optimal strategy will follow the shortest economic path that makes the most efficient use of resources. An optimal strategy aligns with the concept of Pareto efficiency.

== The three forms of generic competitive strategy ==
Michael Porter, a professor at Harvard Business School, wrote a book in 1985 which identified three strategies that businesses can use to tackle competition. These approaches can be applied to all businesses whether they are product-based or service-based. He called these approaches generic strategies. They include cost leadership, differentiation, and focus. These strategies have been created to improve and gain a competitive advantage over competitors. These strategies can also be recognized as the comparative advantage and the differential advantage.

=== Cost leadership strategy ===
Cost leadership is a business's ability to produce a product or service that will be at a lower cost than other competitors. If the business is able to produce the same quality product but sell it for less, this gives them a competitive advantage over other businesses. Therefore, this provides a price value to the customers. Lower costs will result in higher profits as businesses are still making a reasonable profit on each good or service sold. If businesses are not making a large enough profit, Porter recommends finding a lower-cost base such as labor, materials, and facilities. This gives businesses a lower manufacturing cost over those of other competitors. The company can add value to the customer via transfer of the cost benefit to them.

=== Differential strategy ===
A differentiation advantage is gained when a business's products or services are different from its competitors. In his book, Michael Porter recommended making those goods or services attractive to stand out from their competitors. The business will need strong research, development, and design thinking to create innovative ideas. These improvements to the goods or service could include delivering high quality to customers. If customers see a product or service as being different from other products, consumers are willing to pay more to receive these benefits.

=== Focus strategy ===
Focus strategy ideally tries to get businesses to aim at a few target markets rather than trying to target everyone. This strategy is often used for smaller businesses since they may not have the appropriate resources or ability to target everyone. Businesses that use this method usually focus on the needs of the customer and how their products or services could improve their daily lives. In this method, some firms may even let consumers give their inputs for their product or service.

This strategy can also be called the segmentation strategy, which includes geographic, demographic, behavioral, and physical segmentation. By narrowing the market down to smaller segments, businesses are able to meet the needs of the consumer. Porter believes that once businesses have decided what groups they will target, it is essential to decide if they will take the cost leadership approach or differentiation approach. Focus strategy will not make a business successful. Porter mentions that it is important to not use all 3 generic strategies because there is a high chance that companies will come out achieving no strategies instead of achieving success. This can be called "stuck in the middle", and the business will not be able to have a competitive advantage.

When businesses can find the perfect balance between price and quality, it usually leads to a successful product or service. A product or service must offer value through price or quality to ensure the business is successful in the market. To succeed, it is not enough to be "just as good as" another business. Success comes to firms that can deliver a product or service in a manner that is different, meaningful, and based on their customers' needs and desires. Deciding on the appropriate price and quality depends on the business's brand image and what they hope to achieve in relation to their competition.

== Core competencies ==
Core competencies form the foundation of corporate competitiveness. A core competency is a concept introduced by Prahalad and Hamel (1990). Core competencies fit within the "resource-based view of the firm". Resources can be tangible or intangible.

A firm's knowledge assets are an important intangible source of competitive advantage. For firm knowledge to provide a competitive advantage, it must be generated, codified, and diffused to others inside the organization. Many different types of knowledge can serve as a resource-based advantage, such as manufacturing processes, technology, or market-based assets such as knowledge of customers or processes for new product development. Firms with a knowledge-based core competency can increase their advantage by learning from "contingent workers" such as technical experts, consultants, or temporary employees. Those outsiders bring knowledge inside a firm, such as sharing understanding of competing technologies. Moreover, interactions with contingent workers can provoke the firm to codify knowledge that was tacit in order to communicate with the temporary employees. The benefits of these interactions with outsiders increases with the "absorptive capacity" of the firm. However, there is some risk that these interactions cause leakage or dilution of knowledge assets to others who later hire the same temporary employees. Modern knowledge management theory now suggests that serendipity can be tapped as a strategic advantage for building a core competency.

The competitiveness of a company is based on the ability to develop core competencies. A core competency is, for example, a specialised knowledge, technique, or skill. Yang (2015) concluded, with the examination of a long-term development model, that developing core competencies and effectively implementing core capabilities are important strategic actions for any enterprise in order to pursue high long-term profits. In the end, real advantage can be created by the management's ability to unify corporate-wide technologies and production skills into competencies that capacitate individual businesses to adapt quickly to changing opportunities.

To sustain leadership in a chosen core competency area, companies should seek to maximize their competency factors in the core products like being important in positioning its values, distinctive (differentiated), superior, communicable (visibility), unique, affordable, and profitable. When a company achieves this goal, it allows it to shape the evolution of an end market.

== Corporate identity ==
The operational model for managing corporate reputation and image of Gray and Balmer (1998) proposes that corporate identity, communication, image, and reputation are the fundamental components of the process of creating competitive advantage. Corporate identity through corporate communication creates corporate image and reputation, with an end result of competitive advantage.

Corporate identity is the reality of an organization. It refers to the distinct characteristics or core competencies of the organization. It is the mental picture of the company held by its audiences. Corporate communication refers to all the official and informal communication sources, through a variety of media, by which the company outsources its identity to its audiences or stakeholders. Corporate communication is the bridge between corporate identity and corporate image or reputation.

The above-stated process has two main objectives, namely to create the intended image in the minds of the company's principal constituents and managing the process to create a favourable reputation in the minds of the important stakeholders. Gray and Balmer (1998) say that a strong image can be built through a coordinated image-building campaign and reputation, on the other hand, requires a praiseworthy identity that can only be shaped through consistent performance.

Positioning is an important marketing concept. The main purpose of positioning is often to create the right perceptions in comparison to competitors. Thus, it creates competitive advantage. This positioning, or competitive advantage, is based on creating the right "image" or "identity" in the minds of the target group. This positioning decision exists of selecting the right core competencies to build upon and emphasize.

== Unfair competitive advantage ==
Anti-competitive practices may arise to the benefit of one or more businesses operating within a competitive context, for example in public procurement if one bidder has access to information not available to other bidders.

== Externalities ==
Competitive advantages can be reduced by differences between countries in externalities, such as taxes, tariffs or regulations.

== See also ==
- Comparative advantage
- Core competency
- Cost leadership
- Differentiation (economics)
- Economies of scale
- Porter's generic strategies
- Regulatory economics
- Resource-based view
- Risk transformation
- Tacit knowledge
- Value chain
