= Delta model =

Delta model (after the Greek letter Delta, standing for transformation and change) is a customer-based approach to strategic management. Compared to a philosophical focus on the characteristics of a product (product economics), the model is based on consumer economics. The aim is to create a very strong bond between the company and its customer or its complementors (other products and services in the same business ecosystem). The customer-centric model was developed by Dean Wilde and Arnoldo Hax. The model was first thought about at a confab of alumni that took place at Massachusetts Institute of Technology (MIT). The development of the delta model created a large amount of research into the drivers of sustainable profitability for businesses.

== Why Dean L Wilde II and Arnoldo C.Hax created the "Delta model" ==
The set of frameworks and methodologies grew from the fact that changes in the world of business were so significant that existing managerial frameworks had become invalid or incomplete. They failed to explain the success of many products or services. For example, Microsoft's Windows product was neither low cost nor did it have unique features, so why has it been so successful. These huge advancements were further magnified by the internet. The internet created a huge potential for communication and the incredible technology surrounding e- business and e-commerce enabled completely new business approaches. The idea was to get companies to stop focusing so strongly on competitors but to focus their strategies more around customers and complementors.

Delta Model with three main strategic options, and eight strategic positions.

== The Delta model contains the following ==
The delta model can be illustrated using the strategic triangle (see fig.1). There are three points: system lock-in, best customer solutions and best product. System lock- in enables market dominance and can achieve complementor share, it focuses on the entire system economics and instead of product-centered economics, which makes it very sustainable. Best customer solutions need cooperation and will achieve customer share. Best product enables the company to get the edge on competition, which will increase market share. These strategic points enable us to see strategic positions that show us new sources of profit.

== Delta model vs Porter's five forces ==
The Delta model does not focus on competition unlike Porter's five forces. One of Porter's forces is bargaining power of customer (haggling), whereas the Delta model aims to create a relationship with the customer and not see them as competition. Therefore, a negative of the Delta model is price, as putting the customer first and building an immensely strong customer rapport may mean that the company will struggle to increase prices.

== Haxioms ==
Haxioms are a set of principles, proposed by Arnoldo Hax, which serve as a framework for the conceptualization of the Delta Model, and since it somehow challenges the conventional wisdom regarding strategic thinking:

1. The center of the strategy is the customer
  This is the center of the Delta Model, being the customer the driving force for all actions undertaken by the company. Thus, the effort the Organizations have to do is to configure high value-added propositions to customers which will be both creative and unique.
2. You don't win by beating the competition. You win by achieving Customer Bonding
  Just as the central focus of the management is the Customer, the central focus of the strategy should be Customer Bonding. This stage is recognizable by a relationship based on transparency, fairness, and which produces long term benefits for all involved.
3. Strategy is not war; it is Love
  When we define the essence of strategy as a competitive advantage, we are at the same time denoting conflict as the way to think about business. If instead we reject this notion, our mind opens up to new alternatives and, since we are no longer in confrontation with our partners, other forms of cooperation can be considered. The extreme way of non-conflict is indeed LOVE.
4. A product-centric mentality is constraining; open your mindset to include the customers, the suppliers and the complementors as your key constituencies
  Since all business are related and dependent on other members of the supply chain, a wider view is needed to see this expanded enterprise, which is the entity of real importance in our strategic analysis. In this way we can better propose high-value propositions to our customers.
5. Try to understand your customer deeply. Strategy is done one customer at a time.
  The granular customer analysis is fundamental to complete a sensible customer segmentation. the extreme is in fact the consideration of each single customer individually with his/her own needs and wants.
6. Commodities only exist in the mind of the inept.
7. The foundations of strategy are two: 1. Customer segmentation and customer value proposition 2. The firm as a bundle of competencies
8. Reject the two truisms:"the customer is always right" and "I know the customers need and how to satisfy them" This principle by Hax argues that the customer cannot always be "right" as the customer has no idea what can be offered to them and if a close relationship has not been formed between the customer and business, how can the business understand their needs. Satisfaction can only be achieved by working jointly with the customers
9. The strategic planning process is a dialogue among the key executives of the firm seeking a consensus on the direction of the organizations.
10. Metrics are essential; experimentation is crucial.

Arnoldo C. Hax and Dean Wilde publications

1. The Delta Project: Discovering New Sources of Profitability in a Networked Economy (2003) Palgrave Macmillan

2. The Delta Model: Reinventing Your Business Strategy (2009) Springer

== See also ==
- Five forces analysis
- Resource-based view
- Value chain
- Porter's four corners model
- Six steps for creating a winning business strategy with the Delta Model
