= Context analysis =

Analytical method

Context analysis is a method to analyze the environment in which a business operates. Environmental scanning mainly focuses on the macro environment of a business. But context analysis considers the entire environment of a business, its internal and external environment. This is an important aspect of business planning. One kind of context analysis, called SWOT analysis, allows the business to gain an insight into their strengths and weaknesses and also the opportunities and threats posed by the market within which they operate. The main goal of a context analysis, SWOT or otherwise, is to analyze the environment in order to develop a strategic plan of action for the business.

Context analysis also refers to a method of sociological analysis associated with Scheflen (1963) which believes that 'a given act, be it a glance at [another] person, a shift in posture, or a remark about the weather, has no intrinsic meaning. Such acts can only be understood when taken in relation to one another.' (Kendon, 1990: 16). This is not discussed here; only Context Analysis in the business sense is.

== Define market or subject ==
The first step of the method is to define a particular market (or subject) one wishes to analyze and focus all analysis techniques on what was defined. A subject, for example, can be a newly proposed product idea.

== Trend Analysis ==
The next step of the method is to conduct a trend analysis. Trend analysis is an analysis of macro environmental factors in the external environment of a business, also called PEST analysis. It consists of analyzing political, economical, social, technological and demographic trends. This can be done by first determining which factors, on each level, are relevant for the chosen subject and to score each item as to specify its importance. This allows the business to identify those factors that can influence them. They can’t control these factors but they can try to cope with them by adapting themselves. The trends (factors) that are addressed in PEST analysis are Political, Economical, Social and Technological; but for context analysis Demographic trends are also of importance. Demographic trends are those factors that have to do with the population, like for example average age, religion, education etc. Demographic information is of importance if, for example during market research, a business wants to determine a particular market segment to target. The other trends are described in environmental scanning and PEST analysis. Trend analysis only covers part of the external environment. Another important aspect of the external environment that a business should consider is its competition. This is the next step of the method, competitor analysis.

== Competitor Analysis ==
As one can imagine, it is important for a business to know who its competition is, how they do their business and how powerful they are so that they can be on the defense and offense. In Competitor analysis a couple of techniques are introduced how to conduct such an analysis. Here I will introduce another technique which involves conducting four sub analyses, namely: determination of competition levels, competitive forces, competitor behavior and competitor strategy.

=== Competition levels ===
Businesses compete on several levels and it is important for them to analyze these levels so that they can understand the demand. Competition is identified on four levels:

- Consumer needs: level of competition that refers to the needs and desires of consumers. A business should ask: What are the desires of the consumers?
- General competition: The kind of consumer demand. For example: do consumers prefer shaving with electric razor or a razor blade?
- Brand: This level refers to brand competition. Which brands are preferable to a consumer?
- Product: This level refers to the type of demand. Thus what types of products do consumers prefer?

Another important aspect of a competition analysis is to increase the consumer insight. For example: [Ducati] has, by interviewing a lot of their customers, concluded that their main competitor is not another bicycle, but sport-cars like [Porsche] or [GM]. This will of course influence the competition level within this business.

=== Competitive forces ===
These are forces that determine the level of competition within a particular market. There are six forces that have to be taken into consideration, power of the competition, threat of new entrants, bargaining power of buyers and suppliers, threat of substitute products and the importance of complementary products. This analysis is described in Porter 5 forces analysis.

=== Competitor behavior ===
Competitor behaviors are the defensive and offensive actions of the competition.

=== Competitor strategy ===
These strategies refer to how an organization competes with other organizations. And these are: low price strategy and product differentiation strategy.

== Opportunities and Threats ==
The next step, after the trend analysis and competitor analysis are conducted, is to determine threats and opportunities posed by the market. The trends analysis revealed a set of trends that can influence the business in either a positive or a negative manner. These can thus be classified as either opportunities or threats. Likewise, the competitor analysis revealed positive and negative competition issues that can be classified as opportunities or threats.

== Organization Analysis ==
The last phase of the method is an analysis of the internal environment of the organization, thus the organization itself. The aim is to determine which skills, knowledge and technological fortes the business possesses. This entails conducting an internal analysis and a competence analysis.

=== Internal analysis ===
The internal analysis, also called SWOT analysis, involves identifying the organizations strengths and weaknesses. The strengths refer to factors that can result in a market advantage and weaknesses to factors that give a disadvantage because the business is unable to comply with the market needs.

=== Competence analysis ===
Competences are the combination of a business’ knowledge, skills and technology that can give them the edge versus the competition. Conducting such an analysis involves identifying market related competences, integrity related competences and functional related competences.

== SWOT-i matrix ==
The previous sections described the major steps involved in context analysis. All these steps resulted in data that can be used for developing a strategy. These are summarized in a SWOT-i matrix. The trend and competitor analysis revealed the opportunities and threats posed by the market. The organization analysis revealed the competences of the organization and also its strengths and weaknesses. These strengths, weaknesses, opportunities and threats summarize the entire context analysis. A SWOT-i matrix, depicted in the table below, is used to depict these and to help visualize the strategies that are to be devised. SWOT- i stand for Strengths, Weaknesses, Opportunities, Threats and Issues. The Issues refer to strategic issues that will be used to devise a strategic plan.

	Opportunities (O_{1}, O_{2}, ..., O_{n})	Threats (T_{1}, T_{2}, ..., T_{n})
Strengths (S_{1}, S_{2}, ..., S_{n})	S_{1}O_{1}...S_{n}O_{1}... S_{1}O_{n}...S_{n}O_{n}	S_{1}T_{1}...S_{n}T_{1}... S_{1}T_{n}...S_{n}T_{n}
Weaknesses (W_{1}, W_{2}, ..., W_{n})	W_{1}O_{1}...W_{n}O_{1}... W_{1}O_{n}...W_{n}O_{n}	W_{1}T_{1}...W_{n}T_{1}... W_{1}T_{n}...W_{n}T_{n}

This matrix combines the strengths with the opportunities and threats, and the weaknesses with the opportunities and threats that were identified during the analysis. Thus the matrix reveals four clusters:

- Cluster strengths and opportunities: use strengths to take advantage of opportunities.
- Cluster strengths and threats: use strengths to overcome the threats
- Cluster weaknesses and opportunities: certain weaknesses hamper the organization from taking advantage of opportunities therefore they have to look for a way to turn those weaknesses around.
- Cluster weaknesses and threats: there is no way that the organization can overcome the threats without having to make major changes.

== Strategic Plan ==
The ultimate goal of context analysis is to develop a strategic plan. The previous sections described all the steps that form the stepping stones to developing a strategic plan of action for the organization. The trend and competitor analysis gives insight to the opportunities and threats in the market and the internal analysis gives insight to the competences of the organization. And these were combined in the SWOT-i matrix. The SWOT-i matrix helps identify issues that need to be dealt with. These issues need to be resolved by formulating an objective and a plan to reach that objective, a strategy.

== Example ==
Joe Arden is in the process of writing a business plan for his business idea, Arden Systems. Arden Systems will be a software business that focuses on the development of software for small businesses. Joe realizes that this is a tough market because there are many software companies that develop business software. Therefore, he conducts context analysis to gain insight into the environment of the business in order to develop a strategic plan of action to achieve competitive advantage within the market.

=== Define market ===
First step is to define a market for analysis. Joe decides that he wants to focus on small businesses consisting of at most 20 employees.

=== Trend Analysis ===
Next step is to conduct trend analysis. The macro environmental factors that Joe should take into consideration are as follows:

- Political trend: Intellectual property rights
- Economical trend: Economic growth
- Social trend: Reduce operational costs; Ease for conducting business administration
- Technological trend: Software suites; Web applications
- Demographic trend: Increase in the graduates of IT related studies

=== Competitor Analysis ===
Following trend analysis is competitor analysis. Joe analyzes the competition on four levels to gain insight into how they operate and where advantages lie.

- Competition level:
  - Consumer need: Arden Systems will be competing on the fact that consumers want efficient and effective conducting of a business
  - Brand: There are software businesses that have been making business software for a while and thus have become very popular in the market. Competing based on brand will be difficult.
  - Product: They will be packaged software like the major competition.
- Competitive forces: Forces that can affect Arden Systems are in particular:
  - The bargaining power of buyers: the extent to which they can switch from one product to the other.
  - Threat of new entrants: it is very easy for someone to develop a new software product that can be better than Arden's.
  - Power of competition: the market leaders have most of the cash and customers; they have to power to mold the market.
- Competitor behavior: The focus of the competition is to take over the position of the market leader.
- Competitor strategy: Joe intends to compete based on product differentiation.

=== Opportunities and Threats ===
Now that Joe has analyzed the competition and the trends in the market he can define opportunities and threats.

- Opportunities:
  - Because the competitors focus on taking over the leadership position, Arden can focus on those segments of the market that the market leader ignores. This allows them to take over where the market leader shows weakness.
  - The fact that there are new IT graduates, Arden can employ or partner with someone that may have a brilliant idea.
- Threats:
  - IT graduates with fresh idea's can start their own software businesses and form a major competition for Arden Systems.

=== Organization analysis ===
After Joe has identified the opportunities and threats of the market he can try to figure out what Arden System's strengths and weaknesses are by doing an organization analysis.

- Internal analysis:
  - Strength: Product differentiation
  - Weakness: Lacks innovative people within the organization
- Competence analysis:
  - Functional related competence: Arden Systems provides system functionalities that fit small businesses.
  - Market-related competence: Arden Systems has the opportunity to focus on a part of the market which is ignored.

=== SWOT-i matrix ===
After the previous analyses, Joe can create a SWOT-i matrix to perform SWOT analysis.

	Opportunities	Threats
Strengths	Product differentiation, market leader ignores market segment
Weaknesses		Lack of innovation, increase in IT graduates

=== Strategic Plan ===
After creating the SWOT-i matrix, Joe is now able to devise a strategic plan.

- Focus all software development efforts to that part of the market which is ignored by market leaders, small businesses.
- Employ recent innovative It graduates to stimulate the innovation within Arden Systems.

== See also ==
- Organization design
- Segmenting and positioning
- Environmental scanning
- Market research
- SWOT analysis
- Six Forces Model
- PESTLE analysis
- Gap analysis
