= Six forces model =

Industry model to gauge profitability and competition

The six forces model is an analysis model used to give a holistic assessment of any given industry and identify the structural underlining drivers of profitability and competition. The model is an extension of the Porter's five forces model proposed by Michael Porter in his 1979 article published in the Harvard Business Review "How Competitive Forces Shape Strategy". The sixth force was proposed in the mid-1990s. The model provides a framework of six key forces that should be considered when defining corporate strategy to determine the overall attractiveness of an industry.

The forces are:

- Competition – assessment of the direct competitors in a given market
- New Entrants – assessment in the potential competitors and barriers to entry in a given market
- End Users/ Buyers – assessment regarding the bargaining power of buyers that includes considering the cost of switching
- Suppliers – assessment regarding the bargaining power of suppliers
- Substitutes – assessment regarding the availability of alternatives
- Complementary Products – assessment of the impact of related products and services within a given market

Although there are a number of factors that can impact profitability in the short term – weather, the business cycle – an assessment of the competitive forces in a given market provides a framework for anticipating and influencing competitiveness and profitability in the medium and long term.

The Six Forces Model expands the Five Forces Model based on market changes. It adapts well to the technological business world. It can analyse whether the company can enter the market complementary to other products or services and act as a long-term substitute for a particular product or service.

== History ==
The model is an extension of Porter's five forces model (1979). The extended model including the sixth force, complementary products, and was proposed in the 1990s.

== Six forces ==
=== Competition ===
There are several dimensions that rivals within an industry can compete on – price discounting (cost leadership strategy), introduction of new services/ products (innovation strategy), improvement of service quality (customer-orientation strategy) etc. High competition between rivals can stifle an industry's profitability.

Intensity of competition is highest if:

- Competitors are equal in size and power as poaching business is hard to avoid
- Industry growth is slow. This causes competing organisations to fight for market share
- Exit barriers are high (e.g. highly specialised assets and management devotion). This can cause companies making low or negative returns to stay in the market leading to excess capacity meaning that healthy competitors' profitability will suffer.
- Competitors are competing on price. Price competition is particularly destructive to profitability as it is easy to identify price competition meaning other competitors can retaliate. This can lead to a vicious cycle of price reductions, reducing profitability and training customers to overlook service/product quality in favour of the cheapest option available to them

While non-price based competition can sometimes escalate to a level at which it starts to undermine industry profitability, it is less likely to happen than price rivalry and can also be valuable to a given industry. Competing in areas such as product features, customer support, delivery time, and brand image isn't likely to be as damaging to profits because it will increase customer value in the product or service and may help establish customer loyalty. This in turn can improve industry profitability through increasing value relative to substitutes and raising the barriers of entry for new potential competitors.

=== New entrants ===
New entrants put pressure on current organisations within an industry through their desire to gain market share. This in turn puts pressure on prices, costs and the rate of investment needed to sustain a business within the industry. The threat of new entrants is particularly intense if they are diversifying from another market as they can leverage existing expertise, cash flow and brand identity as it puts a strain on existing companies profitability.

Barriers to entry restrict the threat of new entrants. If the barriers are high, the threat of new entrants is reduced and conversely if the barriers are low, the risk of new companies venturing into a given market is high. Barriers to entry are advantages that existing, established companies have over new entrants.

According to Porter, there are 7 major barriers:

- Supply-side economies of scale – spreading the fixed costs over a larger volume of units thus reducing the cost per unit. This can discourage new entrant because they either have to start trading at a smaller volume of unit and accept a price disadvantage over larger companies or risk coming into the market on a large scale in an attempt to displace the existing market leader.
- Demand-side economies of scale – this occurs when a buyers willingness to purchase a particular product or service increases with other people's willingness to purchase it. Also known as network effect, people tend to value being in a 'network' with a larger number of people who use the same company.
- Capital requirements – the amount of capital needed to start up within an industry can be a deterrent to new entrants as they will have to self-fund the venture or convince investors that their business model is good enough for an investment.
- Incumbency advantages independent of size – No matter the size of an existing business within an industry they always tend to have certain advantages over new entrants. They are more established so will tend to have better access to raw materials, established connections with suppliers, brand identity, cumulative experience about best working practices etc.
- Unequal access to distribution channels – if there are a limited number of distribution channels for a certain product/ service new entrants may struggle to find a retail or wholesale channel to sell through as existing competitors will have a claim on them.
- Restrictive government policies – policies set out by the government can help or hinder new entrants. Through licensing requirements and restriction on foreign investment the government can regulate industries aiding or preventing new entrant from gain access to a particular market.

=== End users/buyers ===
Powerful customers can play different companies off against each other in order to drive price down or demand a high quality of service. Bargaining power is high in a customer group if:

- Limited number of buyers/one buyer who buys in a large volume – large volume buyers tend to be powerful because they bring a lot of revenue into the company
- Products are not unique – if customers feel that they can get the same product elsewhere they have high bargaining power and will tend to play one vendor off against the other
- Switching costs are low – if customers do not lose anything by switching, they are more likely to switch between vendors

=== Suppliers ===
Powerful suppliers (e.g. labour suppliers) can influence profitability of an industry though charging higher prices, limiting service quality or by shifting costs to the industry participants. A supplier group is powerful if:

- It is more concentrated than the industry it is selling to
- It doesn't heavily rely on the industry to gain revenue
- Switching costs are high for the industry members
- Suppliers produce unique products that have no substitutes
- Can legitimately threaten forward integration – if the industry itself is making a higher amount of money in relation to the supplier, it may provoke them to enter the market. This limits the profitability of an industry as there is not only the threat of a new entrant, there is also the threat of losing the supplier.

=== Substitutes ===
A substitute good can be described as a good that can be used in place of another, to fulfil the same need or want. There are 3 main factors that determine the degree of substitutability of any two given products:

1. The purpose of the product
2. The occasion for using the product
3. The geographical area

The purpose of the products refers to how consumers use the product to satisfy their wants or needs. Products that are close substitutes will fulfil the same or a similar function. As an example, a clothesline and a clothes dryer machine have almost identical purpose

The occasion of the product refers to when, where and how it is used. Products that are used in similar occasions will have a higher degree of substitutability. As an example, orange juice and coffee can be used for the same occasion (i.e. breakfast).

Geographic area refers to the availability of the two products in a given region. Products that are sold in different areas will have a lower degree of substitution, due to the additional costs associated with transporting or travelling to purchase the goods.

Substitute products or services can limit an industries profitability by putting a cap on prices. If an industry fails to differentiate from substitutes through one of the 3 above factors, substitutes will threaten profitability.

Factors influencing the threat of substitutes include:

- Switching costs – if customers do not lose anything by switching then the threat of substitution increases
- Price-performance trade off – if the substitute offers an attractive trade off between price and performance in relation to the industry product. The better the relative value of the substitute the stronger the negative impact it will have on profitability
- Buyers propensity to substitute – how willing the consumer is to use a substitute. Can incorporate both intangible and tangible factors such as brand loyalty and contractual agreements
- Perceived level of product differentiation - how unique the product or service is
- Ease of substitution
- Availability of close substitutes

When the threat of substitutes is high, industry profitability suffers.

=== Complementary products ===
This force was the sixth force, added in the revised 1990s model. It refers to products or services that are compatible with what a particular industry sells. The effect of complementary goods on an industry's profitability generally depends on how reliant the product or service is on the compatible product. If one cannot function without the other, the impact is high. The impact of complementary products can be good or bad for industry profitability. If the complementary good is doing well within its industry this can have a positive effect on the profitability of a given company. Adversely, if performance is bad or prices rise within the complementary product's market it can negatively impact upon the level of profit that the industry can obtain. For example, when petrol costs rise the public transport industry may suffer reduced profits or be forced increase prices which may cause customers to look for alternatives, e.g. walking and car sharing, again reducing overall profitability of an industry.

== Examples of complementary products - The Sixth Forces ==
A complementary product is a segment added to the six forces model compared to the five forces model. Two products are complementary when one product or service provides a complementary function. They usually serve the user simultaneously, so they exist as the sixth force of Porter's model.

Examples include tourism & aviation, hot dogs & hot dog buns, and iPhone cases & iPhones.

Tourism & aviation are often tied together - travel to destinations by air and spending money, thus stimulating tourism.

Hot dogs & hot dog buns - are not usually purchased separately but are sold as a bundle and come in the form of a hot dog sandwiched between a bun.

iPhone cases & iPhones – often, people buy cases to protect their phones from accidental damage after they have purchased them, and if the iPhone declines, so does the iPhone case industry.

== Comparison of the six forces model and Porter's five forces model ==
	Six Forces Model	Porter's Five Forces Model
Force one	New entrants	Threat of new entrants
Force two	Substitutes	Threat of substitutes
Force three	End user/buyers	Bargaining power of customers
Force four	Suppliers	Bargaining power of suppliers
Force five	Competition	Competitive rivalry
Force six	Complementary products	

The relationship between the actors in the Six Forces model is no longer abstractly competitive, as in the five forces model, but emphasizes an investment relationship or supply and demand relationship between the actors for common development. Therefore, the six forces model emphasises the cooperation between the various actors to achieve common development. It is, therefore, not a strategy of mutual suppression but a multi-win strategy that focuses on long-term benefits.

== Usage ==
The model is used to identify a firm's strategic position through looking holistically at the forces that effect the industry. It is a framework that helps companies identify threats and evaluate the best strategy to move forward with to increase profitability and competitiveness.

== Criticisms ==
The addition of the 6th force, complementary products, has been contentious. Michael Porter, the originator of the five forces analysis has suggested that complementary products are not an additional force that determine the competitive intensity or profitability of an industry, but rather can be seen as a factor that influences the other five forces. In addition, the revised framework has been challenged by academics and strategists such as Kevin P. Coyne and Somu Subramaniam who have stated that three dubious assumptions underlie the forces:

- That buyers, competitors, and suppliers are unrelated and do not interact and collude
- That the source of value is structural advantage (creating barriers to entry)
- That uncertainty is low, allowing participants in a market to plan for and respond to competitive behaviour.

Other criticisms include:

- It places too much weight on the macro-environment and doesn't assess more specific areas of the business that also impact competitiveness and profitability
- It does not provide any actions to help deal with high or low force threats (e.g., what should management do if there is a high threat of substitution?)

== See also ==
- Complementors
- Context analysis
- Porter five forces analysis
- Porter's four corners model
- SWOT analysis
