= Chinese City Creativity Index =

Chinese index of cities' competitiveness

The Chinese City Creativity Index is China’s first index used for the comparison of cultural industry competitiveness among cities, and it can make an evaluation for the development status of cultural industry in major cities in China from both horizontal and vertical aspects.

== Production ==
On December 12, 2003, The Chinese City Creativity Index is funded by Shenzhen Propaganda Cultural Undertaking Foundation, and hosted and developed by Cultural Industry Research Institute of Shenzhen University.This is an important brand activity held by Shenzhen University since the establishment of the national cultural innovation research center.

== Methods ==
The Chinese City Creativity Index is based on the theoretical methods related to Michael Porter's diamond Model, Systems Theory, etc. A Chinese City Creativity Index model is established, which consists of 4 modules including factor driving force, demand pull force, relevant support force and industrial influence force, 9 secondary indexes and 18 tertiary indexes. The model takes into account not only the promoting effect of various resources such as talents, funds, technologies and culture, but also the pulling function of cultural needs and consumption potentials as well as the supporting role of relevant industries such as communication and network. Moreover, all the indexes adopt the form of both absolute value and relative value, and the index summarization method uses a multiplicative model rather than an additive model. The final index system contains 1 comprehensive index (CCCI) and 4 sub-indexes (factor driving force index, demand pull force index, relevant support force index and industrial influence force index).

== Ranking ==
In 2016, 50 large and medium size cities in China were evaluated, including capitals, sub-provincial cities, direct-controlled municipalities and economically developed cities. The raw data were offered by the city statistical yearbook, the statistical bulletin, the regional economic yearbook and some others relevant government data. By calculations, the top 10 of China city creativity index are Beijing, Shanghai, Shenzhen, Guangzhou, Hangzhou, Suzhou, Tianjin, Nanjing, Qingdao and Wuhan.

index (CCCI) was released in 2020 at the sixth Shenzhen Management Innovation Dialogue Forum, and the 2020 Guangdong-Hong Kong-Macao-Macao Bay City Creative Index was also released simultaneously. The latest index (CCCI) indicates that the creative index of each city has risen significantly, with the top ten cities being Beijing, Shanghai, Shenzhen, Guangzhou, Hong Kong, Hangzhou, Suzhou, Chongqing, Chengdu and Nanjing respectively. Among them, Shenzhen's creative index and growth rate topped the list in China.

== Significance ==
Experts in China have given both positive and high hopes for the index's release. They believe that index (CCCI) has important theoretical guidance and practical reference significance, and its evaluation result is favorable to the horizontal and vertical contrast of the city's cultural industry competitiveness in order to perfect the city's cultural industry policy and enhance the city's cultural industry competitiveness.
