= Diamond model =

Description of international competitive advantage

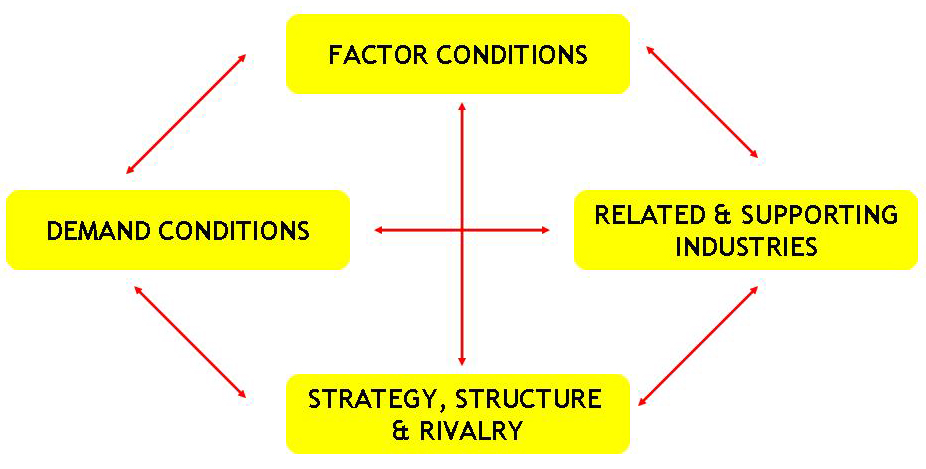
A graphical representation of Porter's National Diamond

Within international business, the diamond model, also known as Porter's Diamond or the Porter Diamond Theory of National Advantage, describes a nation's competitive advantage in the international market. In this model, four attributes are taken into consideration: factor conditions, demand conditions, related and supporting industries, and firm strategy, structure, and rivalry. According to Michael Porter, the model's creator, "These determinants create the national environment in which companies are born and learn how to compete."

== Background ==
Strategic analysis typically focuses on two views of organization: the industry view and the resource-based view (RBV). These views analyse the organisation without taking into consideration relationship between the organizations strategic choice (i.e. Porter generic strategies) and institutional frameworks. The diamond model is a tool for analyzing the organization's task environment. The diamond model highlights that strategic choices should not only be a function of industry structure and a firm's resources, it should also be a function of the constraints of the institutional framework. Institutional analysis (such as the diamond model) becomes increasingly important as firms enter new operating environments and operate within new institutional frameworks.

Porter's National Diamond framework resulted from a study of patterns of comparative advantage among industrialized nations. It works to integrate much of Porter's previous work in his competitive five forces theory, his value chain framework as well as his theory of competitive advantage into a consolidated framework that looks at the sources of competitive advantage sourcable from the national context. It can be used both to analyze a firm's ability to function in a national market, as well as analyse a national market's ability to compete in an international market.

It recognizes four pillars of research (factor conditions, demand conditions, related and supporting industries, firm structure, strategy and rivalry) that one must undertake in analysing the viability of a nation competing in a particular international market, but it also can be used as a comparative analysis tool in recognising which country a particular firm is suited to expanding into.

Two of the aforementioned pillars focus on the (national) macroeconomics environment to determine if the demand is present along with the factors needed for production (i.e. both extreme ends of the value chain). Another pillar focuses on the specific relationships supporting industries have with the particular firm/nation/industry being studied. The last pillar it looks at the firm's strategic response (microeconomics) i.e. its strategy, taking into account the industry structure and rivalry (see five forces). In this way it tries to highlight areas of competitive advantage as well as competitive weakness, by looking at a companies/nations suitability to the particular conditions of a particular market.

== Components ==
The four different components of the framework are:

=== Factor conditions (endowments) ===
Factor conditions include the nation's production resources, including infrastructure, labor force, land, and natural resources.

According to Porter, "a nation does not inherit but instead creates the most important factors of production—such as skilled human resources or a scientific base". A lack of less important factors, such as an unskilled labor force or access to raw materials, can be mediated through technology or by implementing what Porter calls "a global strategy."

Factor endowment can be categorized into two forms:

- "Home-grown" resources/highly specialized resources
- Natural endowments

For example, in analyzing Hollywood's preeminence in film production, Porter has pointed out the local concentration of skilled labor, including the different schools of film (UCLA and USC) in the area. Also, resource constraints may encourage development of substitute capabilities; Japan's relative lack of raw materials has spurred miniaturization and zero-defect manufacturing.

=== Related and supporting industries ===
This component refers to industries that supply, distribute, or are otherwise related to the industry being examined. For many firms, the presence of related and supporting industries is of critical importance to the growth of that particular industry. A critical concept here is that national competitive strengths tend to be associated with "clusters" of industries. For example, Silicon Valley in the US and Silicon Glen in the UK are techno clusters of high-technology industries which includes individual computer software and semi-conductor firms. In Germany, a similar cluster exists around chemicals, synthetic dyes, textiles and textile machinery.

=== Demand conditions ===
Demand conditions in the domestic market provide the primary driver of growth, innovation and quality improvement. The premise is that a strong domestic market stimulates the firm from being a startup to a slightly expanded and bigger organization. As an illustration, we can take the case of Germany which has some of the world's premier automobile companies like Mercedes, BMW, Porsche. German auto companies have dominated the world when it comes to the high-performance segment of the world automobile industry. However, their position in the market of cheaper, mass-produced autos is much weaker. This can be linked to a domestic market which has traditionally demanded a high level of engineering performance. Also, the transport infrastructure of Germany, with its Autobahns does tend to favor high-performance automobiles.

=== Strategy, structure and rivalry ===
National performance in particular sectors is inevitably related to the strategies and the structure of the firms in that sector. Competition plays a big role in driving innovation and the subsequent upgradation of competitive advantage. Since domestic competition is more direct and impacts earlier than steps taken by foreign competitors, the stimulus provided by them is higher in terms of innovation and efficiency. As an example, the Japanese automobile industry with 8 major competitors (Honda, Toyota, Suzuki, Isuzu, Nissan, Mazda, Mitsubishi, and Subaru) provide intense competition in the domestic market, as well as the foreign markets in which they compete.

=== Other factors ===
Porter identifies two other variables that affect competitiveness. These factors "support and complement the system of national competitiveness but do not create lasting competitive advantages."

==== The role of government ====
The role of government in Porter's Diamond Model is "acting as a catalyst and challenger; it is to encourage - or even push - companies to raise their aspirations and move to higher levels of competitive performance ..." . They must encourage companies to raise their performance, stimulate early demand for advanced products, focus on specialized factor creation and to stimulate local rivalry by limiting direct cooperation and enforcing anti-trust regulations.

==== Chance ====
The role of chance basically denotes the idea that it may occur that many times a product or an enterprise may get an opportunity to maximize its benefits out of sheer luck. Thus chance plays a key role in determining the fate of the product as well.

== Criticism ==
Criticisms of Porter's national diamond model revolve around a number of assumptions that underlie it. As described by Davies and Ellis:

"sustained prosperity may be achieved without a nation becoming 'innovation-driven', strong 'diamonds' are not in place in the home bases of many internationally successful industries and inward foreign direct investment does not indicate a lack of 'competitiveness' or low national productivity".

Porter generalized from the North American, European and Japanese experiences; for countries developing in the presence of these now developed regions of the world, the model may need to be re-examined.

== See also ==
- Cluster development
- Porter 5 forces analysis
- Porter's four corners model
- Strategic management
- Strategic planning
- Techno cluster
