= Strategic fit =

Strategic fit is the degree to which an organization's resources and capabilities align with its strategy and with opportunities in the external environment. Resources are assets and inputs to production, controlled by the company, and capabilities describe what the company can do with those resources. If the company's resources and capabilities are closely aligned with its strategy, the strategy is more likely to succeed.

Strategic fit can be used to evaluate the current strategic position of a company, as well as opportunities such as mergers and acquisitions and divestitures of organizational divisions. Strategic fit is related to the resource-based view of the firm which suggests that valuable, rare and hard-to-imitate resources and capabilities can create a competitive advantage.

== Used in analysis ==
Several tools have been developed that can be used in order to analyze the resources and capabilities of a company. These include SWOT analysis, value chain analysis, cash flow analysis and more. Benchmarking with relevant peers is a tool to assess the relative strengths of the resources and capabilities of the company compared to its competitors.

Strategic fit can also be used to evaluate specific opportunities like mergers and acquisitions. Strategic fit would measure how well the potential acquisition fits with the planned direction (strategy) of the acquiring company. To justify growth through mergers and acquisitions, the transaction should yield a better return than organic growth. A CEO survey by Bain & Company in 1997 showed that 94% of the interviewed CEOs considered strategic fit to be influential in the success or failure of an acquisition.

== Classifications ==
Resources can be classified both as tangible and intangible:

Tangible:

- Financial (cash, securities)
- Physical (Location, plant, machinery)

Intangible:

- Technology (patents, copyrights)
- Human resources (tacit knowledge)
- Brand reputation
- Culture
