= Porter's four corners model =

Predictive tool in business management

Porter's four corners model is a predictive tool designed by Michael Porter that helps in determining a competitor's course of action. Unlike other predictive models which predominantly rely on a firm's current strategy and capabilities to determine future strategy, Porter's model additionally calls for an understanding of what motivates the competitor. This added dimension of understanding a competitor's internal culture, value system, mindset, and assumptions helps in determining a much more accurate and realistic reading of a competitor's possible reactions in a given situation.

== Four corners model ==
Motivation – drivers
This helps in determining competitor's action by understanding their goals (both strategic and tactical) and their current position vis-à-vis their goals. A wide gap between the two could mean the competitor is highly likely to react to any external threat that comes in its way, whereas a narrower gap is likely to produce a defensive strategy. The question to be answered here is: What is it that drives the competitor? These drivers can be at various levels and dimensions and can provide insights into future goals.

Motivation – management assumptions
The perceptions and assumptions the competitor has about itself and its industry would shape strategy. This corner includes determining the competitor's perception of its strengths and weaknesses, organization culture and their beliefs about competitor's goals. If the competitor thinks highly of its competition and has a fair sense of industry forces, it is likely to be ready with plans to counter any threats to its position. On the other hand, a competitor who has a misplaced understanding of industry forces is not very likely to respond to a potential attack. The question to be answered here is: What are competitor's assumption about the industry, the competition and its own capabilities?

Actions – strategy
A competitor's strategy determines how it competes in the market. However, there could be a difference between the company's intended strategy (as stated in the annual report and interviews) and its realized strategy (as is evident in its acquisitions, new product development, etc.). It is therefore important here to determine the competitor's realized strategy and how they are actually performing. If current strategy is yielding satisfactory results, it is safe to assume that the competitor is likely to continue to operate in the same way. The questions to be answered here are: What is the competitor actually doing and how successful is it in implementing its current strategy?

Actions – capabilities
This looks at a competitor's inherent ability to initiate or respond to external forces. Though it might have the motivation and the drive to initiate a strategic action, its effectiveness is dependent on its capabilities. Its strengths will also determine how the competitor is likely to respond to an external threat. An organization with an extensive distribution network is likely to initiate an attack through its channel, whereas a company with strong financials is likely to counter attack through price drops. The questions to be answered here are: What are the strengths and weaknesses of the competitor? Which areas is the competitor strong in?

== Strengths ==
=== Considers implicit aspects of competitive behavior ===
Firms are more often than not aware of their rivals and do have a generally good understanding of their strategies and capabilities. However, motivational factors are often overlooked. Sufficiently motivated competitors can often prove to be more competitive than bigger but less motivated rivals. What sets this model apart from others is its insistence on accounting for the "implicit" factors such as culture, history, executive, consultants, and board's backgrounds, goals, values and commitments and inclusion of management's deep beliefs and assumptions about what works or does not work in the market.

=== Predictive in nature ===
Porter's four corners model provides a framework that ties competitor's capabilities to their assumptions of the competitive environment and their underlying motivations. Looking at both a firm's capabilities (what the firm can do) and underlying implicit factors (their motivations to follow a course of action) can help predict competitor's actions with a relatively higher level of confidence. The underlying assumption here is that decision makers in firms are essentially human and hence subject to the influences of affective and automatic processes described by neuroscientists. Hence by considering these factors along with a firm's capabilities, this model is a better predictor of competitive behavior.

== Use in competitive intelligence and strategy ==
Despite its strengths, Porter's four corners model is not widely used in strategy and competitive intelligence. In a 2005 survey by the Society of Competitive Intelligence Professionals's (SCIP) frequently used analytical tools, Porter's four corners does not even figure in the top ten.

However this model can be used in competitive analysis and strategy as follows:

- Strategy development and testing: Can be used to determine likely actions by competitors in response to the firm's strategy. This can be used when developing a strategy (such as for a new product launch) or to test this strategy using simulation techniques such as a business war game.
- Early warning: The predictive nature of this tool can also alert firms to possible threats due to competitive action.

Porter's four corners also works well with other analytical models. For instance it complements Porter five forces analysis well. Competitive cluster analysis of industry products in turn complements four corners analysis. Using such models that complement each other can help create a more complete analysis.

== See also ==
- Competitive intelligence
- Delta model
- National Diamond
- Porter's five forces analysis
- Six Forces Model
- Value chain
