= Bounded rationality in environmental decision making =

Bounded rationality in environmental decision making is the application of bounded rationality as it relates to environmental policy decisions.

== Background ==
Bounded rationality is the idea that rationality is limited when individuals make decisions. Limitations include the difficulty of the decision problem, the cognitive capability of the mind, and the time available to make the decision. This idea can be applied in any field that involves decision making, such as behavioral economics, cognitive psychology, and environmental policy. Established environmental policy theory is based on the assumption of homo economicus. This means that people are seen as fully rational and acting in a self-regarding manner. This assumption can be troublesome when making environmental policy because policymakers often have an incomplete picture about a given environmental problem. In Gigerenzer et al.'s 2001 book, Bounded Rationality: The Adaptive Toolbox, they define a perfectly rational actor as "requiring unlimited cognitive capabilities. Fully rational man is a mythical hero who knows the solutions to all mathematical problems and can immediately perform all computations, regardless of how difficult they are." All environmental actors are human beings, therefore do not have unlimited cognitive abilities, and are prone to making decisions with incomplete information. The more actors that are involved with an environmental decision, the more complex that decision becomes, and the outcomes become less predictable.

== Policy making ==
The health of the environment is not the only thing in consideration when making environmental policy; other elements are considered such as economics. According to the Porter hypothesis, strict environmental regulations may induce competitiveness among firms, leading to technological innovations that produce cleaner byproducts and less overall harm to the environment. Policies that follow this hypothesis tend to fall under the category of a "green strategy", where the marginal abatement cost is greater than the damage caused to the environment. Some environmental policy decisions are made to have weaker regulations, resulting in a more stimulated resource export economy known as eco-dumping. Eco-dumping is the opposite of a green strategy, where the marginal abatement cost is less than the damaged caused to the environment. These approaches offer two extremes in environmental policy, where multifaceted wicked problems are attempted to be solved by single-faceted policy.
