= Nonmarket forces =

Forces acting on economic factors from outside a market system

In economics, nonmarket forces (or non-market forces) are those acting on economic factors from outside a market system. They include organizing and correcting factors that provide order to markets and other societal institutions and organizations, as well as forces utilized by price systems other than the free price system.

== Uses, rationales and applications ==
=== First uses ===
The term has been employed since at least the late 1940s. A.O. Hirschman defined "exit and voice as market and nonmarket forces, that is, economic and political mechanisms" in 1970, quoting a 1963 article by Kenneth Arrow which referred to "nonmarket social institutions."

=== Frequent association with government ===
In the business, management, economic and political-science literatures, nonmarket is typically associated with government, compared to other non-economic institutions, as in economist Baron’s (1995: 47) often quoted definition in the strategic-management field:

The nonmarket environment includes the social, political, and legal arrangements that structure interactions outside of, but in conjunction with, markets and private agreements. The nonmarket environment encompasses those interactions between the firm and individuals, interest groups, government entities, and the public that are intermediated not by markets but by public and private institutions. Public institutions differ from markets because of characteristics such as majority rule, due process, broad enfranchisement, collective action, and publicness. Activities in the nonmarket environment may be voluntary, as when the firm cooperates with government officials, or involuntary, such as when government regulates an activity or an activist group organizes a boycott of a firm’s product.

However, other researchers have related nonmarket to the equally important societal institutions of civil society (also called community) and culture as well as to command economies, traditional exchange and non-profit organizations.

=== Other applications of "nonmarket" ===
Besides its reference to markets and firms in a capitalist economic system, nonmarket has also been applied to:

1. command (or centrally-planned) economies where the State owns the economic factors of production and is "the firm" by having internalized private external and internal markets which no longer exist outside of "black markets" (Daniels, Radebaugh & Sullivan, 2007: 141-142)
2. traditional types of exchange systems (e.g., intra-family, intra-clan and between-group trade) dominated by social reciprocity which balances out the giving and receiving of goods in the short and long runs in contrast to the market system where prices result from immediate bargaining for economic advantage (Polanyi, 1944; Smelser, 1963: 87)
3. the non-profit sector (Lohmann, 1989)
4. internal hierarchies (or "private bureaucracies") within the business firm that has internalized external markets on account of the latter’s higher uncertainty and transaction costs (Williamson, 1991, 1999).

=== "Nonmarket" as the antonym of "market" ===
Nonmarket as well as its antecedents "non-economic" and "social" reflects the long search for a term that would encompass what is "not market" after the economic market institution had become the dominant exchange mechanism in modern capitalist economies. "Market" itself is a complex concept which Boyer (1997: 62-66) variously categorized as:

1. a contract (that is, a deal)
2. a physical place (e.g., a farmer’s market)
3. a geographical area where sellers compete for buyers regarding a particular good (e.g., the U.S. market for beef)
4. a mechanism for aligning supply and demand for goods and services through prices
5. an economic system where competition is dominant and results in the immediate as well as intertemporal coordination and equilibration of many independent demands and supplies (for guns, butter, travel services, etc.)
6. any exchange whereby social actors compete for scarce resources (including power, status, legitimacy, justice and love) and ultimately reach some agreement (as in "the market for ideas").

The following definition of market is adapted from Hollingsworth, Schmitter and Streeck (1994: 5) and is related to Boyer’s fourth and fifth meanings of "market":

Markets are arenas where individual or corporate actors holding separate property rights in different resources voluntarily engage in free, legally enforceable contractual buying and selling exchanges, with prices providing information for the allocation of goods and services.

=== Association with a capitalist economic system ===
Most definitions and uses of "nonmarket" and "market" assume a capitalistic economic system characterized by private property in the means of production and where markets provide a social space for voluntary contracts and competitive rivalry (Hollingsworth et al., 1994: 3). Economic markets tend to be very proprietary in that the costs and benefits of exchanges are more closely restricted to the parties directly involved in them – that is, people by and large get only what they pay for, and they pay for what they get – while nonmarket exchange arenas – political, social and cultural – are characterized by much greater spillovers and weaker links between costs and benefits so that a wider universe of parties other than those directly involved in exchanges bear costs and enjoy benefits (Hayes, 1981: 133; Tollison, 1982: 85-89).

=== Underlying societal transformations ===
Most modern societies chose to separate what came to be called the "economy" from other subsystems, and they adopted a "market" way of running it. What would later be labeled the nonmarket referred to other macro institutions (i.e., the state, civil society and culture) that with their organizations and actors interchange and often conflict with interdependent market ones. Particularly since the publication of The Great Transformation (Polanyi, 1944), the concepts of "non-economic," "social" and "nonmarket" have successively emerged to refer to the internal and external factors that assist markets, firms and other types of institutions and organizations to function efficiently and effectively as well as repair their failures.

Boddewyn (2003) interpreted them as "four perspectives on nonmarket" which the following sections analyze in terms of:

1. their level of analysis (macro or micro)
2. the contested subordination of market institutions to nonmarket ones
3. the degree to which nonmarket factors are endogenized or exogenized in market models
4. the enactibility of the nonmarket environment.

== Four conceptual perspectives on nonmarket ==
=== Nonmarket at the societal level ===
For political economists (e.g., Baron, 1995; Kindleberger, 1969), social-systems theorists (e.g., Parsons & Smelser, 1956) and some political scientists (e.g., Hirschman, 1970), society is made up of subsystems – economic, political, social and cultural – each one with its own institutions and organizations. In modern capitalist societies, the economic subsystem is mainly enacted through market institutions and organizations (firms). In this context, nonmarket refers to exogenous non-economic subsystems, institutions and organizations – political, social and cultural – and to their distinct functioning and interacting with market ones – including the issue of which one predominates over the others through both market and nonmarket media and modes of exchange (money, power, inclusion/exclusion, legitimization, validation, reciprocity, trust, zeal, moral commitment, etc.). At both extremes of this relationship, one has either an overly constrained market system dominated by other societal institutions or a "market society" ruled by market actors, values and processes. Both extremes represent failures of effective integration between market and nonmarket societal subsystems.

=== Nonmarket at the firm level ===
Micro-economists (e.g., Milgrom & Roberts, 1992) interpret nonmarket to refer to institutions that are "not market in nature" – that is, not related to the pursuit of efficiency through complete information, unbounded rationality in relating ends and means, cost-benefit tradeoffs in choosing solutions, material incentives (e.g., prices reflecting supply and demand) used to reconcile divergent personal interests, and competition among actors pursuing such interests. This pursuit of efficiency depends on the existence of such institutions as private property and free contracting but, once the market system is set in motion by society, it operates autonomously in isolation from other societal subsystems. In micro-economic analyses, nonmarket factors either amount to "givens" (e.g., property laws), are treated as "allocationally neutral" because applying to all firms in a particular industry (e.g., corporate tax rates) or are ignored because "nontradeable" (e.g., reputation). Failure results from the lack of perfect competition in markets.

=== Nonmarket at the organizational level ===
In reaction to such "economic-science imperialism" (Buckley & Casson, 1993), other social sciences have identified and promoted political, social and cultural (including moral and ethical) factors as necessary complements to economic ones. Their inclusion helps achieve individual and organizational effectiveness in exchanges through personalized relations, internalized rules, norms and customs. For sociologists (e.g., Granovetter, 1985, 1992), nonmarket refers to endogenized social, political and cultural factors that permeate economic exchanges and are often necessary to achieve individual, organizational and interorganizational effectiveness which is not possible when economic action is "under-socialized." Such factors allow many exchanges to take place even when pricing is difficult, money is inappropriate, markets are not available, property rights are unclear and insecure, and the pursuit of self-interest is insufficient to guarantee orderly transactions free of malfeasance and opportunism. In other words, many micro-economic exchanges are not purely dyadic, rational, self-interested and impersonal since cooperation is common among exchanging parties who frequently conform to rules, norms and customs, thereby developing a "socialized rationality" on account of "the social embeddedness of economic action." Besides, firm actors have the moral obligation to consider the "appropriateness" of their actions. Failure is related to "under-socialized" behavior (e.g., "free-riding") but also to the use of "over-socialized" behaviors such as collusion and fraud (e.g., the Mafia).

=== Nonmarket as corrective mechanisms ===
For political scientists (e.g., Hirschman, 1970), nonmarket refers to the power-based correctives used to improve all organizations – economic, political, social and cultural – when competition among them fails to repair their decline or decay. That is, under any economic, political, social or cultural system, all individuals and organizations are permanently subject to lapses from efficient, rational, law-abiding, virtuous or otherwise functional behavior. Society’s welfare is optimized only when all organizations – those of the market, state, civil society and culture – compete among themselves although inefficient or ineffective organizations may remain insensitive to competition because they can tap other resources (organizational slack, public funding, reciprocity, nationalistic preferences, etc.) to survive even in the face of decline. If competition does not lead to the "exit" of inefficient or ineffective organizations, then political "voice" (petitioning, mobilizing opinion, protesting, resisting, etc.) is needed to change objectionable states of affairs. As such, nonmarket is related to the use of power (including force), with actors using their property and sovereignty rights to exert influence over others who deploy the same rights to resist such attempts. Market "exit" as well as nonmarket "voice" and "loyalty" are used by all organizations, and repair is enactable through these mechanisms even though institutional failure remains a constant occurrence through time and place.

== General definition ==
Based on these four partial definitions, Boddewyn (2003) proposed the following general one:

Nonmarket refers to internal and external organizing and correcting factors that provide order to market and other types of societal institutions and organizations – economic, political, social and cultural – so that they may function efficiently and effectively as well as repair their failures.

== See also ==
- The Great Transformation
- Market
- Market failure
- Planned economy
- Porter's five forces analysis
