= SWOT analysis =

Business planning and analysis technique

The four components of SWOT in a 2 × 2 matrix

In strategic planning and strategic management, SWOT analysis (also known as the SWOT matrix, TOWS, WOTS, WOTS-UP, and situational analysis) is a decision-making technique that identifies the strengths, weaknesses, opportunities, and threats of an organization or project.

SWOT analysis evaluates the strategic position of organizations and is often used in the preliminary stages of decision-making processes to identify internal and external factors that are favorable and unfavorable to achieving goals. Users of a SWOT analysis ask questions to generate answers for each category and identify competitive advantages.

SWOT has been described as a "tried-and-true" tool of strategic analysis, but has also been criticized for limitations such as the static nature of the analysis, the influence of personal biases in identifying key factors, and the overemphasis on external factors, leading to reactive strategies. Consequently, alternative approaches to SWOT have been developed over the years.

== Overview ==
The name is an acronym for four components:

- Strengths: characteristics of the business or project that give it an advantage over others
- Weaknesses: characteristics that place the business or project at a disadvantage relative to others
- Opportunities: elements in the environment that the business or project could exploit to its advantage
- Threats: elements in the environment that could cause trouble for the business or project

Results of the assessment are often presented in the form of a matrix.

=== Internal and external factors ===
Strengths and weaknesses are usually considered internal, while opportunities and threats are usually considered external. The degree to which an organization's internal strengths matches with its external opportunities is known as its strategic fit.

Internal factors may include:

- Human resources—staff, volunteers, board members, stakeholders
- Physical resources—location, building, equipment, plant
- Financial—revenue, grants, investments, other sources of income
- Activities and processes—projects, programs, systems
- Past experiences—reputation, knowledge

External factors may include:

- Future trends in the organization's field or society at large (e.g. macroeconomics, technological change)
- The economy—local, national, or international
- Funding sources—investors, foundations, donors, legislatures
- Demographics—changes in the age, race, gender, culture of those in the organization serviceable area
- Physical environment—growth of location in which organization is situated, access to location
- Legislation
- Local, national, or international events

A number of authors advocate assessing external factors before internal factors.

== Use ==
SWOT analysis has been used at different levels of analysis, including businesses, non-profit organizations, governmental units, and individuals. It is often used alongside other frameworks, such as PEST, as a basis for the analysis of internal and environmental factors. SWOT analysis may also be used in pre-crisis planning, preventive crisis management, and viability study recommendation construction.

=== Strategic planning ===
SWOT analysis can be used to build organizational or personal strategies. The steps necessary to execute a strategy-oriented analysis involve identifying internal and external factors, selecting and evaluating the most important factors, and identifying relationships between internal and external features. For instance, strong relations between strengths and opportunities can suggest good conditions in the company and allow using an aggressive strategy. On the other hand, strong interactions between weaknesses and threats could be analyzed as a warning to use a defensive strategy.

One form of SWOT analysis combines each of the four components with another to examine four distinct strategies:

- WT strategy (mini–mini): Faced with external threats and internal weaknesses, how to minimize both weaknesses and threats?
- WO strategy (mini–maxi): Faced with external opportunities and internal weaknesses, how to minimize weaknesses and maximize opportunities?
- ST strategy (maxi–mini): Faced with internal strengths and external threats, how to maximize strengths and minimize threats?
- SO strategy (maxi–maxi): Faced with external opportunities and internal strengths, how to maximize both opportunities and strengths?

==== Matching and converting ====
A SWOT analysis can be used to generate matching and converting strategies. Matching refers to seeking competitive advantage by matching strengths to opportunities. This strategy ensures that an organization leverages its core competencies, resources, and capabilities to capitalize on favorable market conditions, emerging trends, or unmet customer needs. Conversion refers to converting weaknesses or threats into strengths or opportunities. An example of a conversion strategy is to buy off a threat through collaboration or merger.

=== Marketing ===
In competitor analysis, marketers can use SWOT analysis to detail and profile the competitive strengths and weaknesses of each competitor in the market. This process may involve analysing competitors' cost structures, sources of profits, resources and competencies, competitive positioning, product differentiation, degree of vertical integration, historical responses to industry developments, among other factors. Relevant marketing research methods may include:

- Qualitative marketing research such as focus groups
- Quantitative marketing research such as statistical surveys
- Experimental techniques such as test markets
- Observational techniques such as ethnographic (on-site) observation

Marketing managers may also design and oversee various environmental scanning and competitive intelligence processes to help identify trends and inform the company's marketing analysis.

SWOT analysis of the market position of a small management consultancy with a specialism in human resource management
Strengths	Weaknesses	Opportunities	Threats
Reputation in marketplace	Shortage of consultants at operating level rather than partner level	Well established position with a well-defined market niche	Large consultancies operating at a minor level
Expertise at partner level in HRM consultancy	Unable to deal with multidisciplinary assignments because of size or lack of ability	Identified market for consultancy in areas other than HRM	Other small consultancies looking to invade the marketplace

=== In community organizations ===
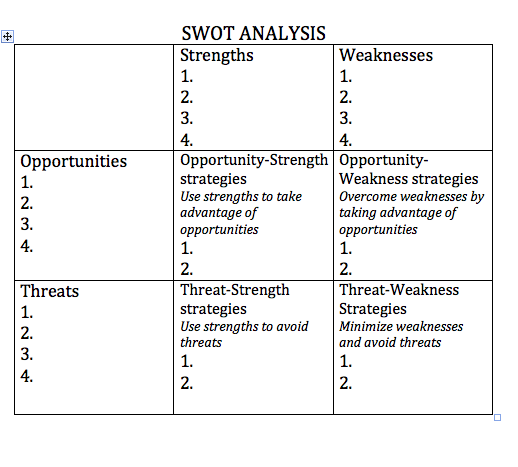
An example of a SWOT template that includes cells for strategies, not only assessments

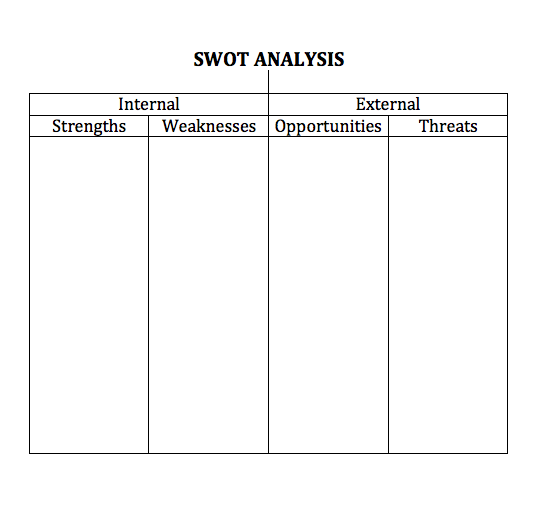
A simple SWOT template

Although the SWOT analysis was originally designed for business and industries, it has been used in governmental organizations and non-governmental organisations as a tool for identifying external and internal support to combat internal and external opposition for successful implementation of social services and social change efforts. Understanding particular communities can come from public forums, listening campaigns, and informational interviews and other data collection. SWOT analysis provides direction to the next stages of the change process. It has been used by community organizers and community members to further social justice in the context of social work practice, and can be applied directly to communities served by a specific nonprofit or community organization.

== Limitations and alternatives ==
SWOT analysis is intended as a starting point for discussion and not to, in itself, show managers how to achieve a competitive advantage.

In a highly-cited 1997 critique, "SWOT Analysis: It's Time for a Product Recall", Terry Hill and Roy Westbrook observed that one among many problems of SWOT analysis as often practiced is that "no-one subsequently used the outputs [of SWOT analysis] within the later stages of the strategy". Hill and Westbrook, among others, also criticized hastily designed SWOT lists. Other limitations of SWOT practice include: preoccupation with a single strength, such as cost control, leading to a neglect of weaknesses, such as product quality; and domination by one or two team members doing the SWOT analysis and devaluing possibly important contributions of other team members. Many other limitations have been identified.

Business professors have suggested various ways to remedy the common problems and limitations of SWOT analysis while retaining the SWOT framework.

=== Porter's five forces ===
Michael Porter developed the five forces framework as an alternative to SWOT analyses, which he found lacking in rigor and over-dependent on individual company circumstances.

=== SOAR ===
SOAR (strengths, opportunities, aspirations, and results) is an alternative technique inspired by appreciative inquiry. SOAR has been criticized as having similar limitations as SWOT, such as "the inability to identify the necessary data".

=== SVOR ===
In project management, the alternative to SWOT known by the acronym SVOR (Strengths, Vulnerabilities, Opportunities, and Risks) compares the project elements along two axes: internal and external, and positive and negative. It takes into account the mathematical link that exists between these various elements, considering also the role of infrastructures. The SVOR table provides an intricate understanding of the elements hypothesized to be at play in a given project:

Forces	Internal	Mathematical link	External
Positive	Total Forces	Total Forces given constraints = Infrastructures / Opportunities	Opportunities
Mathematical link	Vulnerabilities given constraints = 1 / Total Forces	constant k	Opportunities given constraints = 1 / Risks
Negative	Vulnerabilities	Risks given constraints = k / Vulnerabilities	Risks

Constraints consist of: calendar of tasks and activities, costs, and norms of quality. The "k" constant varies with each project (for example, it may be valued at 1.3).

== History ==
In 1965, three colleagues at the Long Range Planning Service (LRPS) of Stanford Research Institute—Robert F. Stewart, Otis J. Benepe, and Arnold Mitchell—wrote a technical report titled Formal Planning: The Staff Planner's Role at Start-Up. The report described how a person in the role of a company's staff planner would gather information from managers assessing operational issues grouped into four components represented by the acronym SOFT: the "satisfactory" in present operations, "opportunities" in future operations, "faults" in present operations, and "threats" to future operations. Stewart et al. focused on internal operational assessment and divided the four components into present (satisfactory and fault) and future (opportunity and threat), and not, as would later become common in SWOT analysis, into internal (strengths and weaknesses) and external (opportunities and threats).

Also in 1965, four colleagues at the Harvard Graduate School of Business Administration (later the Harvard Business School)—Edmund P. Learned, C. Roland Christensen, Kenneth R. Andrews, and William D. Guth—published the first of many editions of the textbook Business Policy: Text and Cases. (Business policy was a term then current for what has come to be called strategic management.) The first chapter of the textbook stated, without using the acronym, the four components of SWOT and their division into internal and external appraisal:

Deciding what strategy should be is, at least ideally, a rational undertaking. Its principal subactivities include identifying opportunities and threats in the company's environment and attaching some estimate of risk to the discernible alternatives. Before a choice can be made, the company's strengths and weaknesses must be appraised.

Looking back from three decades later, in the book Strategy Safari (1998), management scholar Henry Mintzberg and colleagues said that Business Policy: Text and Cases "quickly became the most popular classroom book in the field", widely diffusing its authors' ideas, which Mintzberg et al. called the "design school" model (in contrast to nine other schools that they identified) of strategic management, "with its famous notion of SWOT" emphasizing assessment of a company's internal and external situations. However, the textbook contains neither a 2 × 2 SWOT matrix nor any detailed procedure for doing a SWOT assessment. Strategy Safari and other books identified Kenneth R. Andrews as the co-author of Business Policy: Text and Cases who was responsible for writing the theoretical part of the book containing the SWOT components. More generally, Mintzberg et al. attributed some conceptual influences on what they called the "design school" (of which they were strongly critical) to earlier books by Philip Selznick (Leadership in Administration, 1957) and Alfred D. Chandler Jr. (Strategy and Structure, 1962), with other possible influences going back to the McKinsey consulting firm in the 1930s.

However, a 2023 history of SWOT by Richard W. Puyt and colleagues criticized Mintzberg's "vilification of SWOT" and Mintzberg's apparently poor knowledge of the LRPS at Stanford. Puyt et al. considered the LRPS to be the originator of SWOT (via SOFT) and said that the claim of Mintzberg and others that SWOT was invented at, or disseminated by, Harvard Business School is an "academic urban legend".

By the end of the 1960s, the four components of SWOT (without using the acronym) had appeared in other publications on strategic planning by various authors, and by 1972 the acronym had appeared in the title of a journal article by Norman Stait, a management consultant at the British firm Urwick, Orr and Partners. By 1973, the acronym was well-known enough that accountant William W. Fea, in a published lecture, mentioned "the mnemonic, familiar to students, of S.W.O.T., namely strengths, weaknesses, opportunities, threats". Early examples of a 2 × 2 SWOT matrix are found in John Argenti's book Systematic Corporate Planning (1974) and in a 1980 article by management professor Igor Ansoff (but Ansoff used the acronym T/O/S/W instead of SWOT). In the 1960s Ansoff had worked with the LRPS, where the SOFT approach originated.

== In popular culture ==
- Television: In the 2015 Silicon Valley episode "Homicide" (Season 2, Episode 6), Jared Dunn (Zach Woods) introduces the Pied Piper team to SWOT analysis. Later in that episode Dinesh (Kumail Nanjiani) and Gilfoyle (Martin Starr) employ the method when deciding whether or not to inform a stunt driver that the calculations for his upcoming jump were performed incorrectly.

== See also ==
- Benchmarking
- Enterprise planning systems
- Problem structuring methods
- Program evaluation and review technique (PERT)
- Semiotic square (Greimas square)
- Situation analysis
- Six forces model
- VRIO (Value, Rarity, Imitability, Organization)
