= Economics of Strategy =

- Hardcover, 6th edition
- Language: English
- Subject: Business strategy, economic theory
- Genre: Non-fiction
- Publisher: John Wiley & Sons
- Publication date: September 4, 2012 (6th edition)
- Publication place: United States
- Media type: Print, e-book
- Pages: 560 pp.
- ISBN: 978-1118273630

Economics of Strategy is a textbook by David Besanko, David Dranove, Scott Schaefer, and Mark Shanley. The book offers an economic foundation for strategic analysis. The text was initially published in 1996 by John Wiley & Sons and, as of 2017, available in its seventh edition.The Economics of strategy, 5th édition has been translated into French by Thierry Burger-Helmchen, Julien Pénin and Caroline Hussler, under the title "Principes économiques de stratégie", edited by DeBoeck.

== Overview ==
This influential business book provides a detailed and comprehensive text offering a link between economic theory and business applications. The book uses economic theory to discuss and to quantify popular concepts of modern business strategy. The text is technical in its approach but accessible due to its numerous real-world examples. Key economic principles discussed include economies of scale, economies of scope, transaction-cost economics, market entry, and commitment and agency issues.

== Sections ==
- Part One centers on the boundaries of the firm;
- Part Two discusses competition;
- Part Three focuses on positioning and sustaining advantage; and
- Part Four covers the interface among the theory of the firm, organization design, and business strategy.

== See also ==
- Business analysis
- Business model
- Competitive advantage
- Management consulting
- Strategy dynamics
- Strategic planning
- Strategic Management Society
- Six Forces Model
