= Katherine Gehl =

American businesswoman and author

Katherine Marie Gehl
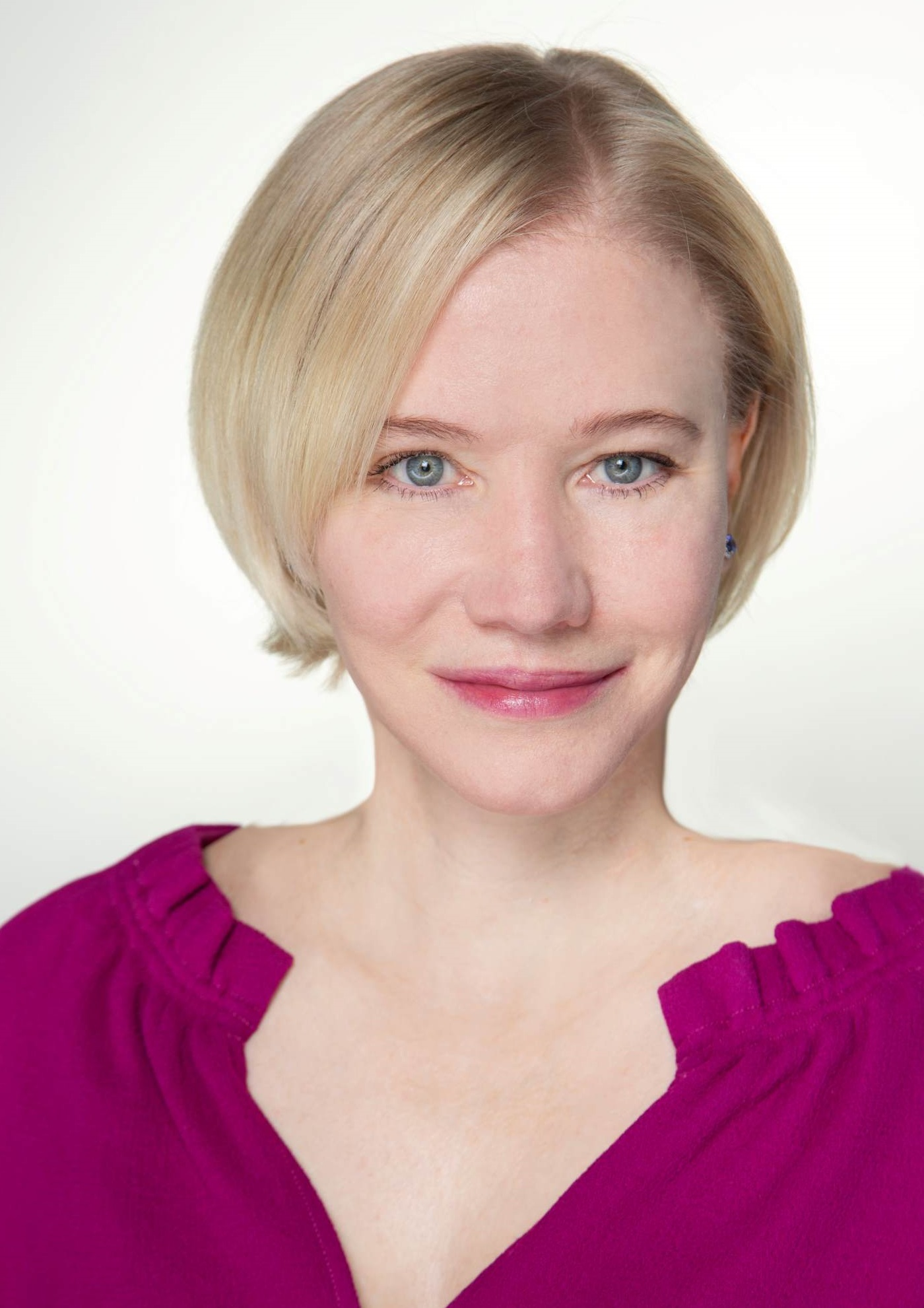
- Born: 1966 (age 59–60); Milwaukee, Wisconsin (USA)
- Education: University of Notre Dame Catholic University of America Northwestern University
- Parents: John Paul Gehl (father); Nancy Faye Gehl (mother)
- Website: katherinegehl.com

Katherine M. Gehl (born 1966) is an American businesswoman. She was the president and CEO of her family-owned company, Gehl Foods, Inc. She served as a member of the board of directors of the Overseas Private Investment Corporation, a role to which she was nominated by President Barack Obama in 2010. She later founded the Institute for Political Innovation.

== Early life and education ==
Gehl was raised in a small town in Wisconsin, the daughter of former Gehl Foods CEO John P. Gehl. She is the second of five children.

She graduated from the University of Notre Dame in 1988 and holds an MA in education from the Catholic University of America. She also earned an MBA from Northwestern University Kellogg School of Management.

== Career ==
Before she began working at Gehl Foods, Gehl held a range of public and private industry positions. These roles included being vice president at Bernstein Investment Research and Management, special assistant to Mayor Richard M. Daley for technology and economic development, director of information technology services at Chicago Public Schools, and organization development manager at Oracle Corporation.

During Gehl's tenure as CEO at Gehl Foods, the company was honored as part of the "Wisconsin 75", and was included in the top 100 dairy companies in the nation. BizTimes named it small business of the year in 2015, and the Milwaukee Business Journal named it as one of Southeast Wisconsin's "Fast Growing Firms".

Gehl oversaw the company's acquisition by Wind Point Partners in 2015, and still serves on the board of directors. At the time of the sale, Gehl Foods had nearly $250 million in sales and 350 employees. Gehl earned attention for sharing proceeds with workers of the company's sale.

== Overseas Private Investment Corporation ==
In 2010, Gehl was nominated by President Barack Obama to serve as a member of the Board of Directors of the Overseas Private Investment Corporation, and was confirmed by the United States Senate in October 2011. She stepped down in 2015.

== Affiliations, honors, and awards ==
Gehl is a board member of the Marcus Corporation, West Bend Mutual Insurance Company, Gehl Foods LLC, The History Makers, University of Wisconsin's Robert M. La Follette School of Public Affairs, The Water Council, and The Milwaukee Repertory Theater. She is a former board member for Joffrey Ballet, Public Allies, the Faye Gehl Conservation Foundation, and the Golden Apple Foundation. She is a member of the Greater Milwaukee Committee, The Economic Club of Chicago, and the University Club of Milwaukee.

Gehl was named to Who's Who in Chicago Business, was honored with Crain's Chicago Business "40 under 40, Chicago's Rising Stars" designation, and was a 2001 Leadership Greater Chicago Fellow. In 2013, she was honored by the BizTimes with the Bravo Entrepreneur Award and was included in the Business Journal's listing of influential Milwaukee business leaders. She received the Sacagawea Award in 2016.

In 2020, Gehl was awarded The Quadracci Family Award presented by Milwaukee Magazine.

== Political involvement ==
Before her departure from Gehl Foods in 2015, Gehl began supporting No Labels, a national organization working to break the political gridlock in Washington, D.C. She also serves on the CEO Fiscal Leadership Council of the Campaign to Fix the Debt, and is a board member of Unite America (formerly The Centrist Project). She is co-founder and chair of the nonpartisan Wisconsin group Democracy Found, which advocates for a new primary election system and general election system that reduce political campaign advantages for far-left and far-right candidates. In 2017, Gehl and Michael E. Porter from Harvard Business School published an article in Fortune entitled "Why Politics is Failing America."

In 2020, Katherine Gehl co-authored a book with Harvard Business School professor Michael E. Porter called, The Politics Industry: How Political Innovation Can Break Partisan Gridlock and Save Our Democracy.

Also in 2020, she founded the Institute for Political Innovation, a cross-partisan, not-for-profit organization that contributes theory, scholarship, and strategy to catalyze model, modern political change in America. She then co-founded the National Campaign for Final Five Voting to drive awareness of the benefits of Final Five Voting and build a coalition of diverse, cross-partisan supporters for the reform.

On November 3, 2020, a Final-Four Voting structure was adopted by the state of Alaska via a public referendum. On November 8, 2022, Alaska conducted midterm elections via “Final Four Voting".

In November 2022, Nevada voters approved a ballot measure that established Final Five Voting. Gehl was the single largest donor to the campaign, donating more than $6,000,000 to Nevada Voters First.
