= Porter's five forces analysis =

Framework to analyse level of competition within an industry

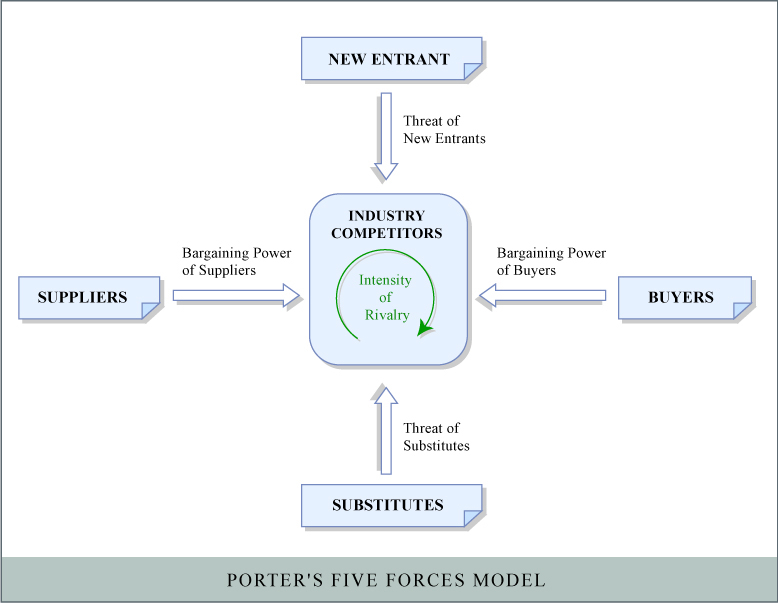
Porter's five forces model.

Porter's Five Forces Framework is a method of analysing the competitive environment of a business. It is rooted in industrial organization economics and identifies five forces that determine the competitive intensity and, consequently, the attractiveness or unattractiveness of an industry with respect to its profitability. An "unattractive" industry is one in which these forces collectively limit the potential for above-normal profits. The most unattractive industry structure would approach that of pure competition, in which available profits for all firms are reduced to normal profit levels. The five-forces perspective is associated with its originator, Michael E. Porter of Harvard Business School. This framework was first published in Harvard Business Review in 1979.

Porter refers to these forces as the microenvironment, to contrast it with the more general term macroenvironment. They consist of those forces close to a company that affects its ability to serve its customers and make a profit. A change in any of the forces normally requires a business unit to re-assess the marketplace given the overall change in industry information. The overall industry attractiveness does not imply that every firm in the industry will return the same profitability. Firms are able to apply their core competencies, business model or network to achieve a profit above the industry average. A clear example of this is the airline industry. As an industry, profitability is low because the industry's underlying structure of high fixed costs and low variable costs afford enormous latitude in the price of airline travel. Airlines tend to compete on cost, and that drives down the profitability of individual carriers as well as the industry itself because it simplifies the decision by a customer to buy or not buy a ticket. This underscores the need for businesses to continuously evaluate their competitive landscape and adapt strategies in response to changes in industry dynamics, exemplified by the airline industry's struggle with profitability despite varying approaches to differentiation. A few carriers – such as Richard Branson's Virgin Atlantic – have tried, with limited success, to use sources of differentiation in order to increase profitability.

Porter's Five Forces include three sources of "horizontal competition"—the threat of substitute products or services, the threat posed by established industry rivals, and the threat of new entrants—and two sources of "vertical competition"— the bargaining power of suppliers and the bargaining power of buyers.

Porter developed his Five Forces Framework in response to the then-prevalent SWOT analysis, which he criticized for its lack of analytical rigor and its ad hoc application. The Five Forces model is grounded in the structure–conduct–performance paradigm of industrial organization economics. Other strategic tools developed by Porter include the value chain framework and the concept of generic competitive strategies.

== Five forces that shape competition ==
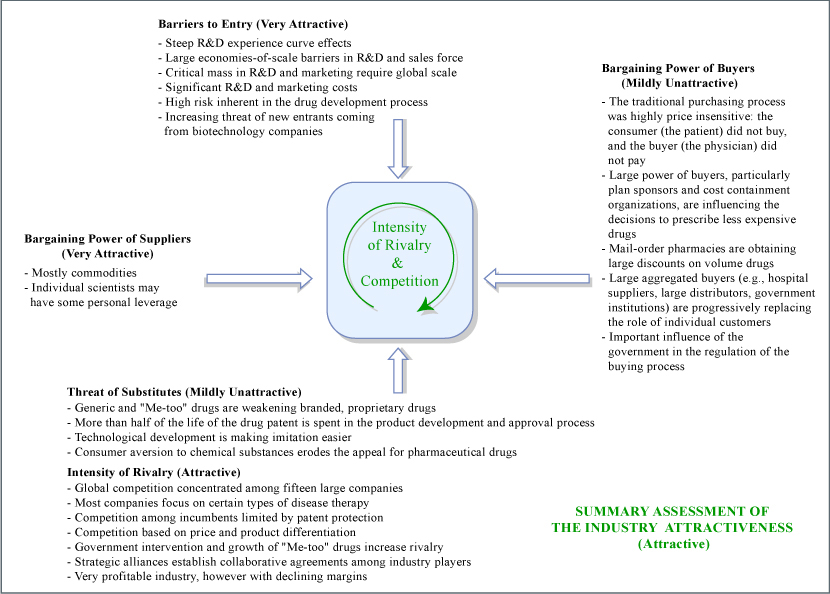
Elements of industry structure: Porter's five forces.

=== Threat of new entrants ===
New entrants put pressure on current within an industry through their desire to gain market share. This in turn puts pressure on prices, costs, and the rate of investment needed to sustain a business within the industry. The threat of new entrants is particularly intense if they are diversifying from another market as they can leverage existing expertise, cash flow, and brand identity which puts a strain on existing companies profitability.

Barriers to entry restrict the threat of new entrants. If the barriers are high, the threat of new entrants is reduced, and conversely, if the barriers are low, the risk of new companies venturing into a given market is high. Barriers to entry are advantages that existing, established companies have over new entrants.

Michael E. Porter differentiates two factors that can have an effect on how much of a threat new entrants may pose:

Barriers to entry
The most attractive segment is one in which entry barriers are high and exit barriers are low. It is worth noting, however, that high barriers to entry almost always make exit more difficult.
Michael E. Porter lists seven major sources of entry barriers:
- Supply-side economies of scale – spreading the fixed costs over a larger volume of units thus reducing the cost per unit. This can discourage a new entrant because they either have to start trading at a smaller volume of units and accept a price disadvantage over larger companies, or risk coming into the market on a large scale in an attempt to displace the existing market leader.
- Demand-side benefits of scale – this occurs when a buyer's willingness to purchase a particular product or service increases with other people's willingness to purchase it. Also known as the network effect, people tend to value being in a 'network' with a larger number of people who use the same company.
- Customer switching costs – These are well illustrated by structural market characteristics such as supply chain integration but also can be created by firms. Airline frequent flyer programs are an example.
- Capital requirements – clearly the Internet has influenced this factor dramatically. Websites and apps can be launched cheaply and easily as opposed to the brick-and-mortar industries of the past.
- Incumbency advantages independent of size (e.g., customer loyalty and brand equity).
- Unequal access to distribution channels – if there are a limited number of distribution channels for a certain product/service, new entrants may struggle to find a retail or wholesale channel to sell through as existing competitors will have a claim on them.
- Government policy such as sanctioned monopolies, legal franchise requirements, patents, and regulatory requirements.
Expected retaliation
For example, a specific characteristic of oligopoly markets is that prices generally settle at an equilibrium because any price rises or cuts are easily matched by the competition.

=== Threat of substitutes ===
A substitute product uses a different technology to try to solve the same economic need. Examples of substitutes are meat, poultry, and fish; landlines and cellular telephones; airlines, automobiles, trains, and ships; beer and wine; and so on. For example, tap water is a substitute for Coke, but Pepsi is a product that uses the same technology (albeit different ingredients) to compete head-to-head with Coke, so it is not a substitute. Increased marketing for drinking tap water might "shrink the pie" for both Coke and Pepsi, whereas increased Pepsi advertising would likely "grow the pie" (increase consumption of all soft drinks), while giving Pepsi a larger market share at Coke's expense.

Potential factors:

- Buyer propensity to substitute. This aspect incorporated both tangible and intangible factors. Brand loyalty can be very important as in the Coke and Pepsi example above; however, contractual and legal barriers are also effective.
- Relative price performance of substitute
- Buyer's switching costs. This factor is well illustrated by the mobility industry. Uber and its many competitors took advantage of the incumbent taxi industry's dependence on legal barriers to entry and when those fell away, it was trivial for customers to switch. There were no costs as every transaction was atomic, with no incentive for customers not to try another product.
- Perceived level of product differentiation which is classic Michael Porter in the sense that there are only two basic mechanisms for competition – lowest price or differentiation. Developing multiple products for niche markets is one way to mitigate this factor.
- Number of substitute products available in the market
- Ease of substitution
- Availability of close substitutes

=== Bargaining power of customers ===
The bargaining power of customers is also described as the market of outputs: the ability of customers to put the firm under pressure, which also affects the customer's sensitivity to price changes. Firms can take measures to reduce buyer power, such as implementing a loyalty program. Buyer power is higher if buyers have many alternatives, lower if they have few choices.

Potential factors:

- Buyer concentration to firm concentration ratio
- Degree of dependency upon existing channels of distribution
- Bargaining leverage, particularly in industries with high fixed costs
- Buyer switching costs
- Buyer information availability
- Availability of existing substitute products
- Buyer price sensitivity
- Differential advantage (uniqueness) of industry products
- RFM (customer value) analysis

=== Bargaining power of suppliers ===
The bargaining power of suppliers is also described as the market of inputs. Suppliers of raw materials, components, labour, and services (such as expertise) to the firm can be a source of power over the firm when there are few substitutes. If you are making biscuits and there is only one person who sells flour, you have no alternative but to buy it. Suppliers may refuse to work with the firm or charge excessively high prices for unique resources.

Potential factors are:

- Supplier switching costs relative to firm switching costs
- Degree of differentiation of inputs
- Impact of inputs on cost and differentiation
- Presence of substitute inputs
- Strength of the distribution channel
- Supplier concentration to the firm concentration ratio
- Employee solidarity (e.g. labor unions)
- Supplier competition: the ability to forward vertically integrate and cut out the buyer.

=== Competitive rivalry ===
Competitive rivalry is a measure of the extent of competition among existing firms. Price cuts, increased advertising expenditures, or investing in service/product enhancements and innovation are all examples of competitive moves that might limit profitability and lead to competitive moves. For most industries, the intensity of competitive rivalry is the biggest determinant of the competitiveness of the industry. Understanding industry rivals is vital to successfully marketing a product. Positioning depends on how the public perceives a product and distinguishes it from that of competitors. An organization must be aware of its competitors' marketing strategies and pricing and also be reactive to any changes made. Rivalry among competitors tends to be cutthroat and industry profitability is low while having the potential factors below:

Potential factors:

- Competitive advantage through innovation
- Competition between online and offline organizations
- Level of advertising expense
- Powerful competitive strategy which could potentially be realized by adhering to Porter's work on low cost versus differentiation.
- Firm concentration ratio

== Factors, not forces ==
Other factors below should also be considered as they can contribute in evaluating a firm's strategic position. These factors can commonly be mistaken for being the underlying structure of the firm; however, the underlying structure consists of the five factors above.

=== Industry growth rate ===
Sometimes bad strategy decisions can be made when a narrow focus is kept on the growth rate of an industry. While rapid growth in an industry can seem attractive, it can also attract new entrants especially if entry barriers are low and suppliers are powerful. Furthermore, profitability is not guaranteed if powerful substitutes become available to the customers.

For example, Blockbuster dominated the rental market throughout 1990s. In 1998, Reed Hastings founded Netflix and entered the market. Netflix's CEO was famously laughed out of the room. While Blockbuster was thriving and expanding rapidly, its key pitfall was ignoring its competitors and focusing on its growth in the industry.

=== Technology and innovation ===
The technology industry continues to expand rapidly, yet it has inherent limitations—most notably, customers often cannot physically interact with or test products. Technology alone does not always deliver a compelling customer experience. In some cases, companies in traditional, high-barrier-to-entry industries with high switching costs and price-sensitive buyers can achieve greater profitability than those positioned as “tech-savvy.”

For example, quite commonly websites with menus and online booking options attract customers to a restaurant. But the restaurant experience cannot be delivered online with the use of technology. Food delivery companies like Uber Eats can deliver food to customers but cannot replace the restaurant's atmospheric experience.

=== Government ===
Government cannot be a standalone force as it is a factor that can affect the firms structure of five forces above. It is neither good or bad for the industry's profitability.

For instance,

- patents can raise barriers to entry
- supplier power can be raised by union favoritism from government policies
- failing companies reorganizing due to bankruptcy laws

=== Complementary products and services ===
Similar to the government above, complementary products/services cannot be a standalone factor because it's not necessarily bad or good for the industry's profitability. Complements occur when a customer benefits from multiple products combined. Individually those standalone products can be redundant. For example, a car would be unusable without petrol/gas and a driver. Or for example, a computer is best used with computer software. This factor is controversial (as discussed below in Criticisms) as many believe it to be a 6th Force. However, complements influence the forces more than they form the underlying structure of the market.

For instance, complements can

- influence barriers of entry by either lowering or raising it e.g. Apple providing set of tools to develop apps, lowers barriers to entry;
- make substitution easier e.g. Spotify replacing CDs

A strategy consultant's job is to identify complements and apply them to the forces above.

== Usage ==
Strategy consultants occasionally use Porter's five forces framework when making a qualitative evaluation of a firm's strategic position. However, for most consultants, the framework is only a starting point and value chain analysis or another type of analysis may be used in conjunction with this model. Like all general frameworks, an analysis that uses it to the exclusion of specifics about a particular situation is considered naïve.

According to Porter, the five forces framework should be used at the line-of-business industry level; it is not designed to be used at the industry group or industry sector level. An industry is defined at a lower, more basic level: a market in which similar or closely related products and/or services are sold to buyers (see industry information). A firm that competes in a single industry should develop, at a minimum, one five forces analysis for its industry. Porter makes clear that for diversified companies, the primary issue in corporate strategy is the selection of industries (lines of business) in which the company will compete. The average Fortune Global 1,000 company competes in 52 industries.

== Criticisms ==
Porter's framework has been challenged by other academics and strategists. For instance, Kevin P. Coyne and Somu Subramaniam claim that three dubious assumptions underlie the five forces:

- That buyers, competitors, and suppliers are unrelated and do not interact and collude.
- That the source of value is a structural advantage (creating barriers to entry).
- That uncertainty is low, allowing participants in a market to plan for and respond to changes in competitive behavior.

An important extension to Porter's work came from Adam Brandenburger and Barry Nalebuff of Yale School of Management in the mid-1990s. Using game theory, they added the concept of complementors (also called "the 6th force") to try to explain the reasoning behind strategic alliances. Complementors are known as the impact of related products and services already in the market. The idea that complementors are the sixth force has often been credited to Andrew Grove, former CEO of Intel Corporation.

Porter indirectly rebutted the assertions of other forces, by referring to innovation, government, and complementary products and services as "factors" that affect the five forces.

It is also perhaps not feasible to evaluate the attractiveness of an industry independently of the resources that a firm brings to that industry. It is thus argued (Wernerfelt 1984) that this theory be combined with the resource-based view (RBV) in order for the firm to develop a sounder framework.

Other criticisms include:

- It places too much weight on the macro-environment and does not assess more specific areas of the business that also impact competitiveness and profitability
- It does not provide any actions to help deal with high or low force threats (e.g., what should management do if there is a high threat of substitution?)

== See also ==
- Competition
- Economics of Strategy
- Industry classification
- Marketing Strategy
- National Diamond
- Strategic management
- Porter's four corners model
- Nonmarket forces
- Value chain
- Marketing management
- Enshittification
