= Porter hypothesis =

Hypothesis that strict environmental regulations can spur innovation

According to the Porter hypothesis, strict environmental regulations can induce efficiency and encourage innovations that help improve commercial competitiveness. The hypothesis was formulated by the Harvard University economist Michael Porter in an article in 1991. Porter and Claas van der Linde, of the University of St. Gallen, detailed the hypothesis in the 1995 journal article "Toward a New Conception of the Environment-Competitiveness Relationship."

The hypothesis suggests that strict environmental regulation triggers the discovery and introduction of cleaner technologies and environmental improvements, the innovation effect, making production processes and products more efficient. The cost savings that can be achieved are sufficient to overcompensate for both the compliance costs directly attributed to new regulations and the innovation costs. In the first-mover advantage, a company is able to exploit innovation by learning curve effects or patenting and attains a dominating competitive position compared to companies in countries where environmental regulations were enforced much later.

Various studies found that stricter environmental regulation stimulates innovation, the "weak" version of Porter hypothesis.

== Mixed evidence ==
There is mixed evidence whether stricter regulation enhances business performance, the "strong" version of Porter hypothesis. Whether the type of regulation - market-based approaches or requirements and prohibitions – has an impact, is an open question. Economic theory suggests that market based instruments could be more efficient but there is mixed empirical evidence. A study of OECD countries, however, showed no evidence of permanent effects of environmental policy tightening on productivity following the introduction of environmental measures, regardless of the type of regulation.

== Application ==
The Porter hypothesis has been applied to REACH. In one conclusion, companies that adopt a cost leadership business strategy and have a relatively small product portfolio will fare better than companies that compete by product differentiation and have a larger number of chemicals that require regulation.

== See also ==
- Competitive advantage
- Deindustrialization
- Externality
- Eco-tariff
- Regulatory economics
