= Complementors =

Complementors are businesses that directly sell a product (or products) or service (or services) that complement the product or service of another company by adding value to mutual customers; for example, Intel and Microsoft (Pentium processors and Windows), or Microsoft and McAfee (Microsoft Windows & McAfee anti-virus).

Complementors are sometimes called "The Sixth Force" (from Porter's Five Forces model), a term which was coined by Adam Brandenburger.

== See also ==
- Porter's five forces analysis
