= Porter's generic strategies =

Pursuit of competitive advantage

Michael Porter's generic strategies describe how a company can pursue competitive advantage across its chosen market scope. There are three generic strategies: cost leadership, product differentiation, and focus. The focus strategy comprises two variants—cost focus and differentiation focus—allowing the overall framework to be interpreted as four distinct strategic approaches.

A company chooses to pursue one of two types of competitive advantage, either via lower costs than its competition or by differentiating itself along dimensions valued by customers to command a higher price. A company also chooses one of two types of scope, either focus (offering its products to selected segments of the market) or industry-wide, offering its product across many market segments. The generic strategy reflects the choices made regarding both the type of competitive advantage and the scope. The concept was described by Michael Porter in 1980.

== Concept ==
Porter wrote in 1980 that strategy targets either cost leadership, differentiation, or focus. These are known as his three generic strategies, which can be applied to any size or form of business. Porter claimed that a company must only choose one of the three or risk that the business would waste precious resources. Porter's generic strategies detail the interaction between cost minimization strategies, product differentiation strategies, and market focus strategies of firms.

Michael Porter described an industry as having multiple segments that can be targeted by a firm. The breadth of its targeting refers to the competitive scope of the business. Porter defined two types of competitive advantage: lower cost or differentiation relative to its rivals. Achieving competitive advantage results from a firm's ability to cope with the five forces better than its rivals. Porter wrote: "Achieving competitive advantage requires a firm to make a choice ... about the type of competitive advantage it seeks to attain and the scope within which it will attain it." He also wrote: "The two basic types of competitive advantage [differentiation and lower cost] combined with the scope of activities for which a firm seeks to achieve them lead to three generic strategies for achieving above average performance in an industry: cost leadership, differentiation and focus. The focus strategy has two variants, cost focus and differentiation focus."

In general:

- If a firm is targeting customers in most or all segments of an industry based on offering the lowest price, it is following a cost leadership strategy;
- If it targets customers in most or all segments based on attributes other than price (e.g., via higher product quality or service) to command a higher price, it is pursuing a differentiation strategy. It is attempting to differentiate itself along these dimensions favorably relative to its competition. It seeks to minimize costs in areas that do not differentiate it, to remain cost competitive; or
- If it is focusing on one or a few segments, it is following a focus strategy. A firm may be attempting to offer a lower cost in that scope (cost focus) or differentiate itself in that scope (differentiation focus).

Michael Porter's three generic strategies

The concept of choice was a different perspective on strategy, as the 1970s paradigm was the pursuit of market share (size and scale) influenced by the experience curve. Companies that pursued the highest market share position to achieve cost advantages fit under Porter's cost leadership generic strategy, but the concept of choice regarding differentiation and focus represented a new perspective.

Porter stressed the idea that only one strategy should be adopted by a firm and failure to do so will result in the "stuck in the middle" scenario shown above. He discussed the idea that practising more than one strategy will lose the entire focus of the organization: hence clear direction of the future trajectory could not be established. The argument is based on the fundamental that differentiation will incur costs to the firm which clearly contradicts with the basis of low cost strategy and on the other hand relatively standardised products with features acceptable to many customers will not carry any differentiation hence, cost leadership and differentiation strategy will be mutually exclusive. Two focal objectives of low cost leadership and differentiation clash with each other resulting in no proper direction for a firm.

== Origin ==
Empirical research on the profit impact of marketing strategy indicated that firms with a high market share were often quite profitable, but so were many firms with low market share. The least profitable firms were those with moderate market share. This was sometimes referred to as the hole in the middle problem. Porter's explanation of this is that firms with high market share were successful because they pursued a cost leadership strategy and firms with low market share were successful because they used market segmentation to focus on a small but profitable market niche. Firms in the middle were less profitable because they did not have a strategy.

Porter suggested that combining multiple strategies is successful in only one case. Combining a market segmentation strategy with a product differentiation strategy was seen as an effective way of matching a firm's product strategy (supply side) to the characteristics of your target market segments (demand side). But combinations like cost leadership with product differentiation were seen as hard (but not impossible) to implement, due to the potential for conflict between cost minimization and the additional cost of value-added differentiation.

Since that time, empirical research has indicated companies pursuing both differentiation and low-cost strategies may be more successful than companies pursuing only one strategy.

Some commentators have made a distinction between cost leadership, that is, low cost strategies, and best cost strategies. They claim that a low cost strategy is rarely able to provide a sustainable competitive advantage. In most cases firms end up in price wars. Instead, they claim a best cost strategy is preferred. This involves providing the best value for a relatively low price.

== Cost leadership strategy ==
Cost leadership strategies involve the firm winning market share by appealing to cost-conscious or price-sensitive customers. This is achieved by having the lowest prices in the target market segment, or at least the lowest price to value ratio (price compared to what customers receive). To succeed at offering the lowest price while still achieving profitability and a high return on investment, the firm must be able to operate at a lower cost than its rivals. There are three main ways to achieve this.

The first approach is achieving a high asset utilization. In service industries, this may mean for example a restaurant that turns tables around very quickly, or an airline that turns around flights very fast. In manufacturing, it will involve production of high volumes of output. These approaches mean fixed costs are spread over a larger number of units of the product or service, resulting in a lower unit cost, i.e. the firm hopes to take advantage of economies of scale and experience curve effects. For industrial firms, mass production becomes both a strategy and an end in itself. Higher levels of output both require and result in high market share, and create an entry barrier to potential competitors, who may be unable to achieve the scale necessary to match the firms low costs and prices.

The second dimension is achieving low direct and indirect operating costs. This is achieved by offering high volumes of standardized products, offering basic no-frills products and limiting customization and personalization of service. Production costs are kept low by using fewer components, using standard components, and limiting the number of models produced to ensure larger production runs. Overheads are kept low by paying low wages, locating premises in low rent areas, establishing a cost-conscious culture, etc. Maintaining this strategy requires a continuous search for cost reductions in all aspects of the business. This will include outsourcing, controlling production costs, increasing asset capacity utilization, and minimizing other costs including distribution, R&D and advertising. The associated distribution strategy is to obtain the most extensive distribution possible. Promotional strategy often involves trying to make a virtue out of low cost product features.

The third dimension is control over the value chain encompassing all functional groups (finance, supply/procurement, marketing, inventory, information technology etc.) to ensure low costs. In a supply chain context, this could be achieved by bulk buying to enjoy quantity discounts, squeezing suppliers on price, instituting competitive bidding for contracts, working with vendors to keep inventories low using methods such as Just-in-Time purchasing or Vendor-Managed Inventory. Wal-Mart is famous for squeezing its suppliers to ensure low prices for its goods. Other procurement advantages could come from preferential access to raw materials, or backward integration. For a business which is in control of all functional groups this is suitable for cost leadership; for a business which is only in control of one functional group, this is differentiation. For example, Dell, the computer supplier, initially achieved market share by keeping inventories low and only building computers to order via applying differentiation strategies in supply/procurement chain. This will be clarified in other sections.

Cost leadership strategies are only viable for large firms with the opportunity to enjoy economies of scale and large production volumes and big market share. Small businesses can be "cost focused" not "cost leaders" if they enjoy any advantages conducive to low costs. For example, a local restaurant in a low rent location can attract price-sensitive customers if it offers a limited menu, rapid table turnover and employs staff on minimum wage. Innovation of products or processes may also enable a startup or small company to offer a cheaper product or service where incumbents' costs and prices have become too high. An example is the success of low-cost budget airlines who, despite having fewer planes than the major airlines, were able to achieve market share growth by offering cheap, no-frills services at prices much cheaper than those of the larger incumbents. At the beginning low-cost budget airlines chose "cost focused" strategies but later when the market grew, big airlines started to offer the same low-cost attributes, and so cost focus became cost leadership.

A cost leadership strategy may have the disadvantage of lower customer loyalty, as price-sensitive customers will switch once a lower-priced substitute is available. A reputation as a cost leader may also result in a reputation for low quality, which may make it difficult for a firm to rebrand itself or its products if it chooses to shift to a differentiation strategy in future.

== Differentiation strategy ==
Businesses operating this strategy differentiate their products/services in some way in order to compete successfully. Examples of the successful use of a differentiation strategy are Hero, Asian Paints, HUL, Nike athletic shoes (image and brand mark), BMW Group Automobiles, Perstorp BioProducts, Apple Computer (product's design), and Mercedes-Benz automobiles.

A differentiation strategy is appropriate where the target customer segment is not price-sensitive, the market is competitive or saturated, customers have very specific needs which are possibly under-served, and the firm has unique resources and capabilities which enable it to satisfy these needs in ways that are difficult to copy. These could include patents or other intellectual property (IP), unique technical expertise (e.g. Apple's design skills or Pixar's animation prowess), talented personnel (e.g. a sports team's star players or a brokerage firm's star traders), or innovative processes. Successful differentiation is displayed when a company accomplishes either a premium price for the product or service, increased revenue per unit, or the consumers' loyalty to purchase the company's product or service (brand loyalty). Differentiation drives profitability when the added price of the product outweighs the added expense to acquire the product or service but is ineffective when its uniqueness is easily replicated by its competitors. Successful brand management also results in perceived uniqueness even when the physical product is the same as competitors. This way, Chiquita was able to brand bananas, Starbucks could brand coffee, and Nike could brand sneakers. Fashion brands rely heavily on this form of image differentiation.

Differentiation strategy is not suitable for small companies. It is more appropriate for big companies to apply differentiation in any one or several of the functional groups (finance, purchase, marketing, inventory etc.). This point is critical. For example, GE uses its finance division to differentiate itself. A company may do so in isolation of other strategies or in conjunction with focus strategies (requires more initial investment). It provides a great advantage to use a differentiation strategy (for big companies) in conjunction with focus cost strategies or focus differentiation strategies. Coca-Cola and Royal Crown beverages are good examples of this.

Henry Mintzberg, another business writer, argues that cost leadership is really a form of differentiation, using a lower price as a form of differentiation.

=== Variants on the differentiation strategy ===
The shareholder value model holds that the timing of the use of specialized knowledge can create a differentiation advantage as long as the knowledge remains unique. This model suggests that customers buy products or services from an organization to have access to its unique knowledge. The advantage is static, rather than dynamic, because the purchase is a one-time event.

The unlimited resources model utilizes competitors by practicing a differentiation strategy. An organization with greater resources can manage risk and sustain profits more easily than one with fewer resources. This provides a short-term advantage only. If a firm lacks the capacity for continual innovation, it will not sustain its competitive position over time.

== Focus strategies ==
This dimension is not a separate strategy for big companies due to small market conditions. Big companies which chose applying differentiation strategies may also choose to apply in conjunction with focus strategies (either cost or differentiation). On the other hand, this is definitely an appropriate strategy for small companies especially for those wanting to avoid competition with big ones.

In adopting a narrow focus, the company ideally focuses on a few target markets (also called a segmentation strategy or niche strategy). These should be distinct groups with specialized needs. The choice of offering low prices or differentiated products/services should depend on the needs of the selected segment and the resources and capabilities of the firm. It is hoped that by focusing your marketing efforts on one or two narrow market segments and tailoring your marketing mix to these specialized markets, you can better meet the needs of that target market. The firm typically looks to gain a competitive advantage through product innovation and/or brand marketing rather than efficiency. A focused strategy should target market segments that are less vulnerable to substitutes or where a competition is weakest to earn above-average return on investment.

An example of an American business using a focus strategy is Southwest Airlines, which provides short-haul point-to-point flights in contrast to the hub-and-spoke model of mainstream carriers, United Airlines and American Airlines.

== Subsequent developments ==
Michael Treacy and Fred Wiersema (1993) modified Porter's three strategies in their book The Discipline of Market Leaders to describe three basic "value disciplines" which can create customer value and provide a competitive advantage: these are operational excellence, product leadership, and customer intimacy.

== Criticisms of generic strategies ==
Several commentators have questioned the use of generic strategies, claiming that they lack specificity, lack flexibility, and are limiting, and raising empirical challenges to Porter's model.

Miller questions the notion of being "caught in the middle". He claims that there is a viable middle ground between strategies. Many companies, for example, have entered a market as a niche player and gradually expanded. According to Baden-Fuller and Stopford (1992) the most successful companies are the ones that can resolve what they call "the dilemma of opposites". Furthermore, Reeves and Routledge's (2013) study of entrepreneurial spirit demonstrated this is a key factor in organisation success, differentiation and cost leadership were the least important factors.

However, contrary to the rationalisation of Porter, contemporary research has shown evidence of successful firms practising such a "hybrid strategy”. Research writings of Davis (1984 cited by Prajogo 2007, p. 74) state that firms employing the hybrid business strategy (Low cost and differentiation strategy) outperform the ones adopting one generic strategy. Sharing the same view point, Hill (1988 cited by Akan et al. 2006, p. 49) challenged Porter's concept regarding mutual exclusivity of low cost and differentiation strategy and further argued that successful combination of those two strategies will result in sustainable competitive advantage. As to Wright and other (1990 cited by Akan et al. 2006, p. 50) multiple business strategies are required to respond effectively to any environment condition. In the mid to late 1980s where the environments were relatively stable there was no requirement for flexibility in business strategies but survival in the rapidly changing, highly unpredictable present market contexts will require flexibility to face any contingency (Anderson 1997, Goldman et al. 1995, Pine 1993 cited by Radas 2005, p. 197). After eleven years Porter revised his thinking and accepted the fact that hybrid business strategy could exist (Porter cited by Prajogo 2007, p. 70) and writes in the following manner.

Although Porter had a fundamental rationalisation in his concept about the invalidity of hybrid business strategy, the highly volatile and turbulent market conditions will not permit survival of rigid business strategies since long-term establishment will depend on the agility and the quick responsiveness towards market and environmental conditions. Market and environmental turbulence will make drastic implications on the root establishment of a firm. If a firm's business strategy could not cope with the environmental and market contingencies, long-term survival becomes unrealistic. Diverging the strategy into different avenues with the view to exploit opportunities and avoid threats created by market conditions will be a pragmatic approach for a firm. Critical analysis conducted separately for cost leadership strategy and differentiation strategy identifies elementary value in both strategies in creating and sustaining a competitive advantage. Consistent and superior performance over competition could be reached with stronger foundations in the event “hybrid strategy” is adopted. Depending on the market and competitive conditions, hybrid strategy should be adjusted regarding the extent which each generic strategy (cost leadership or differentiation) should be given priority in practice.
