= Michael Porter =

American businessman and professor (born 1947)

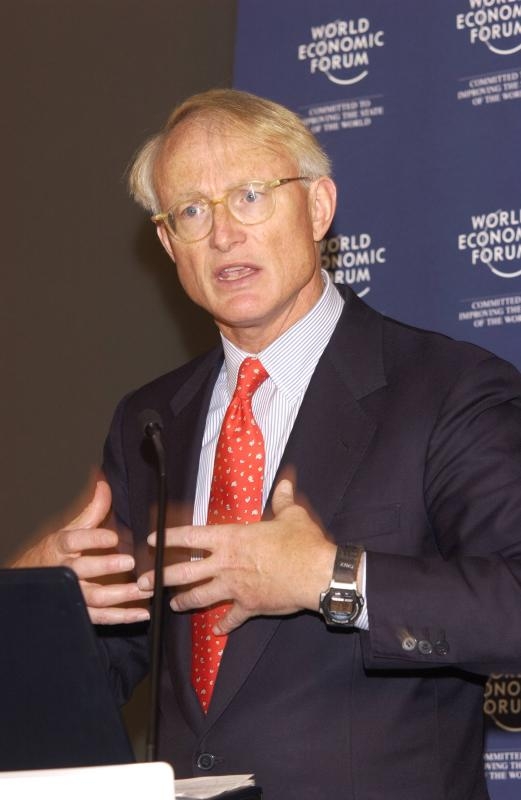
- Porter in 2007
- Born: Michael Eugene Porter; May 23, 1947 (age 79); Ann Arbor, Michigan, US

Academic background
- Education: Princeton University (BSE); Harvard University (MBA, PhD)

Academic work
- Notable ideas: Porter hypothesis Porter's five forces Porter's four corners model
- Website: www.isc.hbs.edu

Michael Eugene Porter (born May 23, 1947) is an American businessman and professor at Harvard Business School. He was one of the founders of the consulting firm The Monitor Group (now part of Deloitte) and FSG, a social impact consultancy. He is credited with creating Porter's five forces analysis, a foundational framework in strategic management that remains widely used in both academia and industry. He is generally regarded as the father of the modern strategy field. He is also regarded as one of the world's most influential thinkers on management and competitiveness as well as one of the most influential business strategists. His work has been recognized by governments, non-governmental organizations and universities.

== Early life and education ==
Michael Porter's father was a civil engineer and Georgia Tech graduate who had also gone on to a career as an army officer. During Porter's childhood, his family moved around the United States, and to France and Canada. This contributed to Porter's interest in understanding the economic development of regions and countries, and the differences in economic outcomes and competitiveness across different regions.

Porter said in an interview that he first became interested in competition through sports. He was on the NCAA championship golf squad at Princeton and also played football, baseball and basketball growing up.

Porter received a BSE with high honors in aerospace and mechanical engineering from Princeton University in 1969, where he graduated first in his class and was elected to Phi Beta Kappa and Tau Beta Pi. He received an MBA with high distinction in 1971 from Harvard Business School (HBS), where he was a George F. Baker Scholar, and a PhD in business economics from Harvard University in 1973. Porter credits Harvard professor Roland "Chris" Christensen with inspiring him and encouraging him to speak up during class. Porter reached the top of his class by his second year at HBS.

== Career ==
Porter developed the Porter five forces analysis framework for analyzing industries, inspired by classes in industrial organization economics that he took at Harvard.

During his career, Porter has emphasized that the essence of strategy is about making choices. He has delivered public speaking based on the importance of strategy formulation and has served as a consultant to many governments and NGOs devising strategy formulations.

Porter is the author of 20 books and numerous articles including Competitive Strategy, Competitive Advantage, Competitive Advantage of Nations, and On Competition, and is the most cited author in business and economics.

=== Competition among nations ===
==== Competitive Advantage ====
Porter wrote The Competitive Advantage of Nations in 1990. The book is based on studies of ten nations and argues that a key to national wealth and advantage was the productivity of firms and workers collectively, and that the national and regional environment supports that productivity. He proposed the "diamond" framework, a mutually-reinforcing system of four factors that determine national advantage: factor conditions; demand conditions; related or supporting industries; and firm strategy, structure and rivalry. Information, incentives, and infrastructure were also key to that productivity.

During April 2014, Porter discussed how the US ranks relative to other countries on a comprehensive scorecard called "The Social Progress Index", an effort which he co-authored. This scorecard rated the US on a comprehensive set of metrics; overall, the US placed 16th.

Michael Porter defined the two ways in which an organization can achieve competitive advantage over its rivals: cost advantage and differentiation advantage. Cost advantage is when a business provides the same products and services as its competitors, albeit at a lesser cost. Differentiation advantage is when a business provides better products and services as its competitors. In Porter's view, strategic management should be concerned with building and sustaining competitive advantage. He originally developed the Porter's Five Forces in 1979 which is still widely used as a model to analyse the industry and to estimate whether it would be profitable and ideal enough to enter the industry after carefully examining the bargaining power of buyers, bargaining power of suppliers, threat of new entrants, competition among existing firms and threat of substitutes. He first wrote and published about Porter's Five Forces in a 1979 article How Competitive Forces Shape Strategy and has further explained about the Five Forces in his 1980 article Competitive Strategy: Techniques for Analyzing Industries and Competitors.

Porter introduced the concept of competitive advantage in 1985. which later went onto become one of the key concepts in management science at present. He also published a book titled Competitive Advantage: Creating and Sustaining Superior Performance in order to explain the concept of competitive advantage and the book which later went onto become a bestseller also focuses on value chain concept.

==== Value chain ====
Porter introduced the concept of value chain analysis in his 1985 book, Competitive Advantage: Creating and Sustaining Superior Performance. The value chain comprises each of the activities, from design through distribution, that a company performs to produce a product; these activities are viewed as the “basic units of competitive advantage".

=== Health care ===
Porter has focused on addressing pressing problems in health care delivery in the US and other countries. His book, Redefining Health Care (written with Elizabeth Teisberg), develops a new strategic framework for transforming the value delivered by the health care system, with implications for providers, health plans, employers, and government, among other actors. The book received the James A. Hamilton award of the American College of Healthcare Executives in 2007 for book of the year. His New England Journal of Medicine perspective article, "A Strategy for Health Care Reform – Toward a Value-Based System" (July 2009), lays out a health reform strategy for the US. His work on health care is employed to address the health care delivery problems in developing countries, in collaboration with Dr. Jim Yong Kim, Dr. Kevin J. Bozic, and others at the Harvard Medical School and Harvard School of Public Health.

=== Consulting ===
Porter acting as a consultant to business, government, and the social sector. He has been a strategy advisor to US and international companies, including Caterpillar, Procter & Gamble, Scotts Miracle-Gro, Royal Dutch Shell, and Taiwan Semiconductor. The Instituto de Estudios Superiores de Administración of Venezuela was influenced under the guidance of Porter, taught American business administration. Porter has served on two public boards of directors, those of Thermo Fisher Scientific and Parametric Technology Corporation. He influence economic policy, working with the Executive Branch and with Congress, and has led national economic-strategy programs in other countries. As of 2009, he was working with the presidents of Rwanda and South Korea.

In 1983, Porter co-founded the Monitor Group, a strategy-consulting firm acquired by Deloitte Consulting in 2013 through a structured bankruptcy proceeding.

=== Non-profit ===
Porter has founded four major non-profit organizations:

- Initiative for a Competitive Inner City – ICIC, founded in 1994, and which he still chairs, which addresses economic development in distressed urban communities;
- the Center for Effective Philanthropy, which creates rigorous tools for measuring foundation effectiveness;
- FSG Social Impact Advisors, a leading non-profit strategy firm which he co-founded with Mark Kramer, serving NGOs, corporations, and foundations in the area of creating social value; and
- the International Consortium for Health Outcomes Measurements (ICHOM), which he co-founded in 2012 with Stefan Larsson and Martin Ingvar. ICHOM supports the key strategic agenda items in Porter's Value-Based Health Care Delivery framework by working with patients and leading healthcare providers to create a global standard for measuring health outcomes.

Porter also currently serves on the Board of Trustees of Princeton University.

=== Politics ===
An analysis by Porter in collaboration with Katherine Gehl frames the US two-party system as a duopoly, a business best described as a "political industry", that competes in ways that serve the parties' interests rather than the public good. Gehl and Porter published a Harvard Business School report on the topic, "Why Competition in the Politics Industry is Failing America" (2017), and later a book, The Politics Industry: How Political Innovation Can Break Partisan Gridlock and Save Our Democracy (2020).

== Honors and awards ==
In 2000, Michael Porter was appointed Bishop William Lawrence University Professor at Harvard, the university's highest recognition awarded to Harvard faculty. He is a six-time winner of the McKinsey Award for the best Harvard Business Review article of the year. He was given a Lifetime Achievement Award in Economic Development from the US Department of Commerce.

== Criticisms ==
Porter's work has received criticism from peers within academia for inconsistent logical argument in his assertions. Porter's conclusions have been critiqued as "lacking in empirical support" and as "justified with selective case studies". These critiques assert that Porter fails to credit original creators of his postulates originating from pure microeconomic theory.

== Legacy ==
He has written numerous books on modern competitive strategy for business. His concepts and theories with regards to strategic management, such as Porter's Five Forces, Porter's Diamond model, Porter's Generic Strategies and Porter's Value Chain, are widely taught in universities.

Porter stated in a 2010 interview: "What I've come to see as probably my greatest gift is the ability to take an extraordinarily complex, integrated, multidimensional problem and get arms around it conceptually in a way that helps, that informs and empowers practitioners to actually do things."

== Work ==
=== Competitive strategy ===
- Porter, M.E. (1979) "How Competitive Forces Shape Strategy", Harvard Business Review, March/April 1979.
- Porter, M.E. (1980) Competitive Strategy, Free Press, New York, 1980. The book was voted the ninth most influential management book of the 20th century in a poll of the Fellows of the Academy of Management.
- Porter, Michael E. (1985). Competitive Advantage. Free Press. ISBN 9780029250907.
- Porter, M.E. (ed.) (1986) Competition in Global Industries, Harvard Business School Press, Boston, 1986.
- Porter, M.E. (1987) "From Competitive Advantage to Corporate Strategy", Harvard Business Review, May/June 1987, pp. 43–59.
- Porter, M.E. (1996) "What is Strategy", Harvard Business Review, Nov/Dec 1996.
- Porter, M.E. (2017) "Michael Porter on Creating Competitive Advantage for Yourself", HBR Ascend
- Porter, M.E. (1998) On Competition, Boston: Harvard Business School, 1998.
- Porter, M.E. (1990, 1998) The Competitive Advantage of Nations, Free Press, New York, 1990.
- Porter, M.E. (1991) "Towards a Dynamic Theory of Strategy", Strategic Management Journal, 12 (Winter Special Issue), pp. 95–117. http://onlinelibrary.wiley.com/doi/10.1002/smj.4250121008/abstract
- McGahan, A.M. & Porter, M.E. Porter. (1997) "How Much Does Industry Matter, Really?" Strategic Management Journal, 18 (Summer Special Issue), pp. 15–30. http://onlinelibrary.wiley.com/doi/10.1002/(SICI)1097-0266(199707)18:1%2B%3C15::AID-SMJ916%3E3.0.CO;2-1/abstract
- Porter, M.E. (2001) "Strategy and the Internet", Harvard Business Review, March 2001, pp. 62–78.
- Porter, M.E. & Kramer, M.R. (2006) "Strategy and Society: The Link Between Competitive Advantage and Corporate Social Responsibility", Harvard Business Review, December 2006, pp. 78–92.
- Porter, M.E. (2008) "The Five Competitive Forces That Shape Strategy", Harvard Business Review, January 2008, pp. 79–93.
- Porter, M.E. & Kramer, M.R. (2011) "Creating Shared Value", Harvard Business Review, Jan/Feb 2011, Vol. 89 Issue 1/2, pp. 62–77
- Porter, M.E. & Heppelmann, J.E. (2014) "How Smart, Connected Products are Transforming Competition", Harvard Business Review, November 2014, pp. 65–88
- Porter, M.E. & Heppelmann, J.E. (2015) "How Smart, Connected Products are Transforming Companies", Harvard Business Review, October 2015, pp. 97–114
- Porter, M.E. & Heppelmann, J.E. (2017) "Why Every Organization Needs an Augmented Reality Strategy", Harvard Business Review, November 2017, pp. 46–62
- Porter, M.E. & Kaplan, R.S. (2019) "Measuring Healthcare Outcomes to Deliver Value and Lower Costs", HealthManagement.org - The Journal, November 2019, pp. 466–467

=== US political competitiveness ===
- Gehl, K.M. & Porter, M.E. (2017) "Why Competition in the Politics Industry is Failing America", Harvard Business School, September 2017.

=== Domestic health care ===
- Porter, M.E. & Teisberg, E.O. (2006) Redefining Health Care: Creating Value-Based Competition On Results, Harvard Business School Press, 2006.
- Berwick, DM, Jain SH, and Porter ME. "Clinical Registries: The Opportunity For The Nation." Health Affairs Blogs, May 2011.

=== Global health care ===
- Jain SH, Weintraub R, Rhatigan J, Porter ME, Kim JY. "Delivering Global Health". Student British Medical Journal 2008; 16:27.
- Kim JY, Rhatigan J, Jain SH, Weintraub R, Porter ME. "From a declaration of values to the creation of value in global health: a report from Harvard University's Global Health Delivery Project". Global Public Health. 2010 Mar; 5(2):181–88.
- Rhatigan, Joseph, Sachin H Jain, Joia S. Mukherjee, and Michael E. Porter. "Applying the Care Delivery Value Chain: HIV/AIDS Care in Resource Poor Settings." Harvard Business School Working Paper, No. 09-093, February 2009.

== Books and commentaries ==
- Understanding Michael Porter: The Essential Guide to Competition and Strategy. Magretta, Joan. Boston: Harvard Business School Publishing, 2012.
- The Lords of Strategy: The Secret Intellectual History of the New Corporate World. Kiechel, Walter III. Harvard Business School Publishing, Boston, 2010.
- The Porter Hypothesis After 20 Years: How Can Environmental Regulation Enhance Innovation and Competitiveness? Stefan Ambec, Mark A. Cohen, Stewart Elgie, and Paul Lanoie. Resources for the Future Discussion Paper, Washington DC, 2011.
- Well-Designed Environmental Regulations will Strengthen Companies' Competitiveness: Reviewing the Porter Hypothesis. Mitsuhashi Tadahiro (ed.) Japan, 2008.
- From Adam Smith to Michael Porter: Evolution of Competitiveness Theory. Cho, Dong-Sung Cho and Hwy-Chang Moon. Asia-Pacific Business Series, Korea, 2000.
- “Retrospective: Michael Porter's Competitive Strategy.” Academy of Management Executive, May 2002, Vol. 16, No. 2
- Perspectives on Strategy: Contributions of Michael E. Porter, F.A.J. van den Bosch and A.P. de Man (eds.), Kluwer Academic Publishers, Dordrecht, The Netherlands, 1997.
- O Projecto Porter: A aplicação a Portugal 1993/94. Lisbon, Portugal: Ministério da Indústria e Energia, May 1995.
- Sölvell, Ö. (2015), "The Competitive Advantage of Nations 25 years – opening up new perspectives on competitiveness". Competitiveness Review, Vol. 25 No. 5, pp. 471–481. https://doi.org/10.1108/CR-07-2015-0068.
- The Politics Industry: How Political Innovation Can Break Partisan Gridlock and Save Our Democracy, Katherine M. Gehl, Michael E. Porter, Harvard Business Review Press, 2020,

== See also ==
- Business cluster
- Marketing strategies
- National Diamond
- Social Progress Index
- Smart, connected products
- Strategic management
- Strategic planning
- Techno cluster
