= Strategic business unit =

Business unit within the overall corporate identity

A strategic business unit (SBU) in business strategic management, is a profit center which focuses on product offering and market segment. SBUs typically have a discrete marketing plan, analysis of competition, and marketing campaign, even though they may be part of a larger business entity.

An SBU may be a business unit within a larger corporation, or it may be a business into itself or a branch. Corporations may be composed of multiple SBUs, each of which is responsible for its own profitability. Companies today often use the word segmentation or division when referring to SBUs or an aggregation of SBUs that share such commonalities.

General Electric (GE) is an example of a company with this sort of business organization. SBUs are able to affect most factors which influence their performance. Managed as separate businesses, they are responsible to a parent corporation. GE has 49 SBUs.

Business writer Michael Porter has developed a value chain model which focusses on the business unit, i.e. a firm's activities within a particular industry.

== Commonalities ==
A SBU is generally defined by what it has in common, as well as the traditional aspects defined by McKinsey: separate competitors; and a profitability bottom line. Four commonalities include:

- Revenue SBU
- Like Marketing Cost SBU
- Like Operations/HR Profit SBU
- Like sales judged on net sales not gross

== Success factors ==
There are three factors that are generally seen as determining the success of an SBU:

1. the degree of autonomy given to each SBU manager.
2. the degree to which an SBU shares functional programs and facilities with other SBUs.
3. the way in which the corporation handles new changes in the market.

== BCG matrix ==
The BCG Matrix, a chart designed by Bruce Henderson for the Boston Consulting Group in 1968, may help corporations to analyze their business units or product lines. This helps the company allocate resources; brand marketing, product management, strategic management and portfolio analysis can use it as an analytical tool.

When using this matrix, SBUs can appear within any of the four quadrants (Star, Question Mark, Cash Cow, Dog) as a circle whose area represents their size. With different colors, competitors may also be shown. The precise location is determined by the two axes, market Growth as the Y axis, Market Share as the X axis. Alternatively, changes over or two years can be shown by shading or other differences in design.xx. Star products currently have high growth and high market-share. The Question Mark identifies products with low share but high growth. A Cash Cow has high share but low growth. Finally, Dog labels a product which has low growth and low share.

== See also ==
- Adversarial purchasing
- Balanced scorecard
- Business analysis
- Business model
- Business plan
- Dynamic capabilities
- Integrated business planning
- Marketing plan
- Marketing strategies
- Management
- Management consulting
- Morphological analysis
- Results-based management
- Revenue shortfall
- Strategy dynamics
- Strategic planning
- Strategic Management Society
- Strategy map
- Strategy Markup Language
- Strategy visualization
- Six Forces Model
