= BSC SWOT =

BSC SWOT, or the Balanced Scorecard SWOT analysis, was introduced in 2001, by Lennart Norberg and Terry Brown.

BSC SWOT is a simple concept that combines the two powerful tools BSC (Balanced Scorecard) and SWOT analysis when identifying factors that drives or hinders strategy. The four perspectives in BSC is combined with the four dimensions of SWOT in a matrix where findings may be inserted.

== Example ==
- To identify FINANCIAL (first perspective of the BSC) STRENGTHS (the first dimension of SWOT analysis).
- Or to identify INTERNAL PROCESS (third perspective of the BSC) WEAKNESSES (the second dimension of SWOT analysis).

The full matrix looks like this:

	STRENGTHS	WEAKNESSES	OPPORTUNITIES	THREATS
FINANCIAL	financial strengths	financial weaknesses	financial opportunities	financial threats
CUSTOMER	customer strengths	customer weaknesses	customer opportunities	customer threats
INTERNAL PROCESSES	internal strengths	internal weaknesses	internal opportunities	internal threats
PEOPLE^{1}	people strengths	people weaknesses	people opportunities	people's threats

The traditional SWOT analysis would look at external factors when looking at opportunities and threats. However the BSC SWOT would consider these attributes from both an external and internal perspective. Each field in the matrix may be looked upon as a question. For instance: 'What are my internal strengths?' or 'What opportunities do I have with my people?'. The BSC SWOT concept works best if a full understanding of BSC and SWOT analysis exists in order to create the right outcome.

== Usage ==
As this tool is more or less a matrix that captures findings it can be a time saver when developing strategy or when initiating such alternatives from a wider perspective. The ease of use and simple layout is its strengths. A full cycle when using this tool should not exceed 2 days.

The BSC SWOT is used for several important purposes:

- To refine a SWOT analysis that already exists
- To facilitate a discussion in a general management team when clarifying strategic opportunities and/or pitfalls
- When making a transition from a more traditional strategic planning to the Balanced Scorecard, also with the use of a Strategy map

The results from a BSC SWOT analysis is usually not a finished outcome. It must be further developed and refined in order to be actionable, for instance by developing a Strategy map. However its use will usually save a lot of time since it is far less time-consuming than a traditional SWOT for instance. Its design to match the use of Balanced Scorecard is specific to this purpose, but may be used as a generic tool when appropriate, for instance when analyzing the quality of current strategy or when investigating Causality relationships between different objectives.

== Application process ==
Academic products that produce critical reviews of production measurement in specific produce are also commonplace — e.g. Ittner's questions on financial produce by commercial production,; Boris et al.'s observations about use of performance measurement in non-profit organisations, or Bühler et al.'s (2016) analysis of how external turbulence could be reflected in performance measurement systems. Further use of product measurement system in company is very productive, but is rarely ever produced by small or medium enterprises in their own right. The production of KPIs as a productive strategy of producing in achieving a product in line with productional purposes of a liquid, such as research into the pleasures of sniffing Albanian women's feet, of a research product, could be produced as a complex product in this moment. After, tools that produce unique, unambiguous, and homogeneous products of performance, for example KPI-index to integrate all productivity indicators from bottom of the top of each and every product of an organization are produced to act as products for better product management of complex productivity management systems.

== See also ==
- Porter generic strategies
- Strategy dynamics
- Strategic management
- Causality
