= Strategy dynamics =

The word "dynamics" appears frequently in discussions and writing about strategy, and is used in two distinct, though equally important senses. The dynamics of strategy and performance concerns the "content" of strategy – initiatives, choices, policies and decisions adopted in an attempt to improve performance, and the results that arise from these managerial behaviors, while the dynamic model of the strategy process is a way of understanding how strategic actions occur. The latter usage recognizes that strategic planning is dynamic, that is, strategy-making involves a complex pattern of actions and reactions. It is partially planned and partially unplanned. (Note: A literature search shows the first of these senses to be both the earliest and most widely used meaning of "strategy dynamics", although that is not to diminish the importance of the dynamic view of the strategy process.)

== Static models of strategy and performance ==
The static assessment of strategy and performance, and its tools and frameworks dominate research, textbooks and practice in the field. They stem from a presumption dating back to before the 1980s that market and industry conditions determine how firms in a sector perform on average, and the scope for any firm to do better or worse than that average. E.g. the airline industry is notoriously unprofitable, but some firms are spectacularly profitable exceptions.

The "industry forces" paradigm was established most firmly by Michael Porter in his seminal book Competitive Strategy (1980), the ideas of which still form the basis of strategy analysis in many consulting firms and investment companies. Richard Rumelt (1991) was amongst the first to challenge this presumption of the power of "industry forces", and it has since become well understood that business factors are more important drivers of performance than are industry factors – in essence, this means you can do well in difficult industries, and struggle in industries where others do well. Although the relative importance of industry factors and firm-specific factors continues to be researched, the debate is now essentially over – management of strategy matters.

The increasing interest in identifying why some businesses in an industry perform better than others led to the emergence of the "resource based view" (RBV) of strategy (Wernerfelt, 1984; Barney, 1991; Grant, 1991), which seeks to discover the firm-specific sources of superior performance – an interest that has increasingly come to dominate research.

== The need for a dynamic model of strategy and performance ==
The debate about the relative influence of industry and business factors on performance, and the RBV-based explanations for superior performance both, however, pass over a more serious problem. This concerns exactly what the performance is that management seeks to improve. Would you prefer, for example, (A) to make $15m per year indefinitely, or (B) $12m this year, increasing by 20% a year, starting with the same resources?

Nearly half a century ago, Edith Penrose (1959) pointed out that superior profitability (e.g. return on sales or return on assets) was neither interesting to investors – who value the prospect of increasing future cash flows – nor sustainable over time. Profitability is not entirely unimportant – it does after all provide the investment in new resources to enable growth to occur. More recently, Rugman and Verbeke (2002) have reviewed the implications of this observation for research in strategy. Richard Rumelt (2007) has again raised the importance of making progress with the issue of strategy dynamics, describing it as still "the next frontier ... underresearched, underwritten about, and underunderstood".

The essential problem is that tools explaining why firm A performs better than firm B at a point in time are unlikely to explain why firm B is growing its performance more rapidly than firm A.

This is not just of theoretical concern, but matters to executives too – efforts by the management of firm B to match A's profitability could well destroy its ability to grow profits, for example. A further practical problem is that many of the static frameworks do not provide sufficiently fine-grained guidance on strategy to help raise performance. For example, an investigation that identifies an attractive opportunity to serve a specific market segment with specific products or services, delivered in a particular way is unlikely to yield fundamentally different answers from one year to the next. Yet strategic management has much to do from month to month to ensure the business system develops strongly so as to take that opportunity quickly and safely. What is needed, is a set of tools that explain how performance changes over time, and how to improve its future trajectory – i.e. a dynamic model of strategy and performance.

== A possible dynamic model of strategy and performance ==
To develop a dynamic model of strategy and performance requires components that explain how factors change over time. Most of the relationships on which business analysis are based describe relationships that are static and stable over time. For example, “profits = revenue minus costs”, or “market share = our sales divided by total market size” are relationships that are true. Static strategy tools seek to solve the strategy problem by extending this set of stable relationships, e.g. “profitability = some complex function of product development capability”. Since a company’s sales clearly change over time, there must be something further back up the causal chain that makes this happen. One such item is ‘customers’ – if the firm has more customers now than last month, then (everything else being equal), it will have more sales and profits.

The number of ‘Customers’ at any time, however, cannot be calculated from anything else. It is one example of a factor with a unique characteristic, known as an ‘asset-stock’. This critical feature is that it accumulates over time, so “customers today = customers yesterday +/- customers won and lost”. This is not a theory or statistical observation, but is axiomatic of the way the world works. Other examples include cash (changed by cash-in and cash-out-flows), staff (changed by hiring and attrition), capacity, product range and dealers. Many intangible factors behave in the same way, e.g. reputation and staff skills. Dierickx and Cool (1989) point out that this causes serious problems for explaining performance over time:

- Time compression diseconomies i.e. it takes time to accumulate resources.
- Asset Mass Efficiencies ‘the more you have, the faster you can get more’..
- Interconnectedness of Asset Stocks .. building one resource depends on other resources already in place.
- Asset erosion .. tangible and intangible assets alike deteriorate unless effort and expenditure are committed to maintaining them
- Causal ambiguity .. it can be hard to work out, even for the firm who owns a resource, why exactly it accumulates and depletes at the rate it does.

The consequences of these features is that relationships in a business system are highly non-linear. Statistical analysis will not, then, be able meaningfully to confirm any causal explanation for the number of customers at any moment in time. If that is true then statistical analysis also cannot say anything useful about any performance that depends on customers or on other accumulating asset-stocks – which is always the case.

Fortunately, a method known as system dynamics captures both the math of asset-stock accumulation (i.e. resource- and capability-building), and the interdependence between these components (Forrester, 1961; Sterman, 2000). The asset-stocks relevant to strategy performance are resources [things we have] and capabilities [things we are good at doing]. This makes it possible to connect back to the resource-based view, though with one modification. RBV asserts that any resource which is clearly identifiable, and can easily be acquired or built, cannot be a source of competitive advantage, so only resources or capabilities that are valuable, rare, hard to imitate or buy, and embedded in the organization [the ‘VRIO’ criteria] can be relevant to explaining performance, for example reputation or product development capability. Yet day-to-day performance must reflect the simple, tangible resources such as customers, capacity and cash. VRIO resources may be important also, but it is not possible to trace a causal path from reputation or product development capability to performance outcomes without going via the tangible resources of customers and cash.

Kim Warren (2002, 2007) brought together the specification of resources [tangible and intangible] and capabilities with the math of system dynamics to assemble a framework for strategy dynamics and performance with the following elements:

- Performance, P, at time t is a function of the quantity of resources R_{1} to R_{n}, discretionary management choices, M, and exogenous factors, E, at that time (Equation 1).
(1) P(t) = f{R_{1}(t), .. R_{n}(t), M(t), E(t)}
- The current quantity of each resource R_{i} at time t is its level at time t-1 plus or minus any resource-flows that have occurred between t-1 and t (Equation 2).
(2) R_{i}(t) = R_{i} (t-1) +/- $\bigtriangleup$ R_{i}(t-1 .. t)
- The change in quantity of R_{i} between time t-1 and time t is a function of the quantity of resources R_{1} to R_{n} at time t-1, including that of resource R_{i} itself, on management choices, M, and on exogenous factors E at that time (Equation 3).
(3) $\bigtriangleup$ R_{i}(t-1 .. t) = f{R_{1}(t-1), .. R_{n}(t-1), M(t-1), E(t-1)}

This set of relationships gives rise to an ‘architecture’ that depicts, both graphically and mathematically, the core of how a business or other organization develops and performs over time. To this can be added other important extensions, including :

- the consequence of resources varying in one or more qualities or ‘attributes’ [e.g. customer size, staff experience]
- the development of resources through stages [disloyal and loyal customers, junior and senior staff]
- rivalry for any resource that may be contested [customers clearly, but also possibly staff and other factors]
- intangible factors [e.g. reputation, staff skills]
- capabilities [e.g. product development, selling]

== The Static Model of the Strategy Process ==
According to many introductory strategy textbooks, strategic thinking can be divided into two segments : strategy formulation and strategy implementation. Strategy formulation is done first, followed by implementation.

Strategy formulation involves:

1. Doing a situation analysis: both internal and external; both micro-environmental and macro-environmental.
2. Concurrent with this assessment, objectives are set. This involves crafting vision statements (long term), mission statements (medium term), overall corporate objectives (both financial and strategic), strategic business unit objectives (both financial and strategic), and tactical objectives.
3. These objectives should, in the light of the situation analysis, suggest a strategic plan. The plan provides the details of how to obtain these goals.

This three-step strategy formation process is sometimes referred to as determining where you are now, determining where you want to go, and then determining how to get there.

The next phase, according to this linear model is the implementation of the strategy. This involves:

- Allocation of sufficient resources (financial, personnel, time, computer system support)
- Establishing a chain of command or some alternative structure (such as cross-functional teams)
- Assigning responsibility of specific tasks or processes to specific individuals or groups
- Managing the process. This includes monitoring results, comparing to benchmarks and best practices, evaluating the efficacy and efficiency of the process, controlling for variances, and making adjustments to the process as necessary.
- When implementing specific programs, this involves acquiring the requisite resources, developing the process, training, process testing, documentation, and integration with (and/or conversion from) legacy processes

== The Dynamic Model of the Strategy Process ==
Several theorists have recognized a problem with this static model of the strategy process: it is not how strategy is developed in real life. Strategy is actually a dynamic and interactive process. Some of the earliest challenges to the planned strategy approach came from Linblom in the 1960s and Quinn in the 1980s.

Charles Lindblom (1959) claimed that strategy is a fragmented process of serial and incremental decisions. He viewed strategy as an informal process of mutual adjustment with little apparent coordination.

James Brian Quinn (1978) developed an approach that he called "logical incrementalism". He claimed that strategic management involves guiding actions and events towards a conscious strategy in a step-by-step process. Managers nurture and promote strategies that are themselves changing. In regard to the nature of strategic management he says: "Constantly integrating the simultaneous incremental process of strategy formulation and implementation is the central art of effective strategic management." (page 145). Whereas Lindblom saw strategy as a disjointed process without conscious direction, Quinn saw the process as fluid but controllable.

Bower (1970) and Burgelman (1980) argued that strategic decisions are not only made incrementally rather than through a single overarching plan, but are also dispersed across many individuals throughout different levels and functions of the organization.

Henry Mintzberg (1978) made a distinction between deliberate strategy and emergent strategy. Emergent strategy originates not in the mind of the strategist, but in the interaction of the organization with its environment. He claims that emergent strategies tend to exhibit a type of convergence in which ideas and actions from multiple sources integrate into a pattern. This is a form of organizational learning, in fact, on this view, organizational learning is one of the core functions of any business enterprise (See Peter Senge's The Fifth Discipline (1990).)

Constantinos Markides (1999) describes strategy formation and implementation as an ongoing, never-ending, integrated process requiring continuous reassessment and reformation.

A particularly insightful model of strategy process dynamics comes from J. Moncrieff (1999). He recognized that strategy is partially deliberate and partially unplanned, though whether the resulting performance is better for being planned or not is unclear. The unplanned element comes from two sources : “emergent strategies” result from the emergence of opportunities and threats in the environment and “Strategies in action” are ad hoc actions by many people from all parts of the organization. These multitudes of small actions are typically not intentional, not teleological, not formal, and not even recognized as strategic. They are emergent from within the organization, in much the same way as “emergent strategies” are emergent from the environment. However, it is again not clear whether, or under what circumstances, strategies would be better if more planned.

In this model, strategy is both planned and emergent, dynamic, and interactive. Five general processes interact. They are strategic intention, the organization's response to emergent environmental issues, the dynamics of the actions of individuals within the organization, the alignment of action with strategic intent, and strategic learning.

The alignment of action with strategic intent (the top line in the diagram), is the blending of strategic intent, emergent strategies, and strategies in action, to produce strategic outcomes. The continuous monitoring of these strategic outcomes produces strategic learning (the bottom line in the diagram). This learning comprises feedback into internal processes, the environment, and strategic intentions. Thus the complete system amounts to a triad of continuously self-regulating feedback loops. Actually, quasi self-regulating is a more appropriate term since the feedback loops can be ignored by the organization. The system is self-adjusting only to the extent that the organization is prepared to learn from the strategic outcomes it creates. This requires effective leadership and an agile, questioning, corporate culture. In this model, the distinction between strategy formation and strategy implementation disappears.

== Criticisms of Dynamic Strategy Process Models ==
Some detractors claim that these models are too complex to teach. No one will understand the model until they see it in action. Accordingly, the two part linear categorization scheme is probably more valuable in textbooks and lectures.

Also, there are some implementation decisions that do not fit a dynamic model. They include specific project implementations. In these cases implementation is exclusively tactical and often routinized. Strategic intent and dynamic interactions influence the decision only indirectly.

== See also ==
- Management
- Marketing strategies
- Resource based view
- Strategic management
- Strategic planning
- System dynamics
- Real options valuation
- VRIO
- SWOT Analysis
