= Third-generation balanced scorecard =

In business performance management, a third-generation balanced scorecard is a version of the traditional balanced scorecard, a structured report, supported by design methods and automated tools, that can be used by managers to keep track of the execution of activities by the staff within their control, and to monitor the consequences arising from these actions.

The third-generation version was developed in the late 1990s to address design problems inherent to earlier generations. It is distinguished by the components making up the balanced scorecard and the design process used to develop these components.

== Components ==
A third-generation balanced scorecard has four main components:

- A destination statement or vision statement: This is a one- or two-page description of the organisation at a defined point in the future, assuming the current strategy has been successfully implemented. The descriptions of the successful future are segmented into perspectives for example financial and stakeholder expectations, customer and external relationships, processes and activities, organisation and culture.
- A strategic linkage model: This is a version of the traditional strategy map that typically contains 12 to 24 strategic objectives segmented into two perspectives, activities and outcomes, analogous to the logical framework. Linkages indicate hypothesised causal relations between strategic objectives.
- A set of definitions for each of the strategic objectives.
- A set of definitions for each of the measures selected to monitor each of the strategic objectives, including targets.

== Design process ==
The design process for third-generation balanced scorecard requires the active involvement of the management team who will eventually use the balanced scorecard. The managers themselves make all decisions about the balanced scorecard content. The process begins with the development of a 'destination or Vision statement' to build management consensus on longer term strategic goals; this document is then used to build a 'strategic linkage model', describing the shorter term management priorities, both the strategic activities to complete and the strategic outcomes to achieve. Once the 'strategic objectives' are decided in outline these are assigned 'owners' from within the management team, who further define each objective, plus the measures and targets associated with achieving each objective.

The main improvements with this third generation of balanced scorecard relate to the improved "ownership" of the objectives by managers, because objectives, goals and outcomes are refined by the responsible managers themselves. All measures and targets must be reviewed to ensure that they are interconnected (dependencies identifies) and congruent (appropriately prioritised and support one another).

In large/complex organisations the scorecard can be developed by functional or project specific areas to relate to the management team for that area. It is important in this case for the team creating the scorecard to understand the linkages between their area and that of other management teams across the organization with whom they may collaborate or have as stakeholders/customers. In many cases the objectives for the scorecard of a functional or project organization will include cascaded objectives and priorities of the host organization, senior leaders, and stakeholders (what is important to them).

== See also ==
- Balanced scorecard
