= Results-based management =

Management framework

Results-based management (RBM) is a tool for monitoring and managing the implementation of strategy. It in many respects is similar to the logical framework approach, a strategy implementation tool used extensively by Non-governmental organizations.

== Process ==
RBM is an example of a tool used for strategic control. It uses feedback loops to help managers monitor and then (hopefully) achieve strategic goals. These goals may take the form of physical outputs, organizational or behavioral changes, workflow changes, or form contribution to some other higher level goal. Information (evidence) of the actual results is used for accountability, reporting, communication and to feedback into the design, resourcing and delivery of projects and operational activities. During the design of an RBM system all people and organizations (actors) who contribute directly or indirectly to the result, map out their business processes, products and services, showing how they contribute to the outcomes being pursued, and this information is used to identify appropriate measures of progress.

Results Based Management has been shown to have strong similarities in its design and use to the third-generation balanced scorecard.

== Usage of RBM ==
The framework is largely used in government and charitable organisations, where purely financial measures are not the key drivers and there is no competition to benchmark against, such as the United Nations and the International Committee of the Red Cross. However, it has also started to be used in semi-commercial organisations such as the Asian Development Bank. At the United Nations, an in-depth results-based approach to programme development and implementation across the majority of all agencies has been applied since 2000, based on the UN Secretary-General Kofi Annan's reform programme of 1997. Results-based budgeting, which is the term for RBM throughout the UN Secretariat, was first applied in the planning of the biennium 2002-2003 and in all programming cycles thereafter.

== Key steps ==
1. Assess: What is the current situation?
2. Think: What caused it? Who is involved?
3. Envision: What are we going to achieve?
4. Plan: How are we going to do it? With whom? When? With what resources?
5. Do: Get it done. How is it going? Do we need to adapt?
6. Review: What went well/badly? What can we learn for next time?

== See also ==
- DICE framework
