= Mission statement =

Summary of an organization's values, philosophies or goals

A mission statement is a short statement of why an organization exists, what its overall goal is, the goal of its operations: what kind of product or service it provides, its primary customers or market, and its geographical region of operation. It may include a short statement of such fundamental matters as the organization's values or philosophies, a business's main competitive advantages, or a desired future state—the "vision".

Historically it is associated with Christian religious groups; indeed, for many years, a missionary was assumed to be a person on a specifically religious mission. The word "mission" dates from 1598, originally of Jesuits sending ("missio", Latin for "act of sending") members abroad.

A mission statement is not simply a description of an organization by an external party, but an expression, made by an organization's leaders, of their desires and intent for the organization. A mission statement aims to communicate the organisation's purpose and direction to its employees, customers, vendors, and other stakeholders. A mission statement also creates a sense of identity for employees. Organizations normally do not change their mission statements over time, since they define their continuous, ongoing purpose and focus.

According to Chris Bart, professor of strategy and governance at McMaster University, a commercial mission statement consists of three essential components:

1. key market: the target audience
2. contribution: the product or service
3. distinction: what makes the product unique or why the audience should buy it over another

Bart estimates that in practice, only about ten percent of mission statements say something meaningful. For this reason, such statements are widely regarded with contempt.

== Purpose ==
Although the notion of business purpose may transcend that of a mission statement, the sole purpose of a commercial mission statement is to summarize a company's main goal/agenda, it outlines in brief terms what the goal of a company is. Some generic examples of mission statements would be, "To provide the best service possible within the banking sector for our customers." or "To provide the best experience for all of our customers." The reason why businesses make use of mission statements is to make it clear what they look to achieve as an organization, not only to themselves and their employees but to the customers and other people who are a part of the business, such as shareholders. As a company evolves, so will their mission statement. This is to make sure that the company remains on track and to ensure that the mission statement does not lose its touch and become boring or stale.

It is important that a mission statement is not confused with a vision statement. As discussed earlier, the main purpose of a mission statement is to get across the ambitions of an organisation in a short and simple fashion; it is not necessary to go into detail for the mission statement which is evident in examples given. The reason why it is important that a mission statement and vision statement are not confused is because they both serve different purposes. Vision statements tend to be more related to strategic planning and lean more towards discussing where a company aims to be in the future.

Religious mission statements are less explicit about key market, contribution and distinction, but clearly describe the organization's purpose. For example: "Peoples Church is called to proclaim the Gospel of Christ and the beliefs of the evangelical Christian faith, to maintain the worship of God, and to inspire in all persons a love for Christ, a passion for righteousness, and a consciousness of their duties to God and their fellow human beings. We pledge our lives to Christ and covenant with each other to demonstrate His Spirit through worship, witnessing, and ministry to the needs of the people of this church and the community."

== Advantages ==
Provides direction: Mission statements are a way to direct a business into the right path. They play a part in helping the business make better decisions which can be beneficial to them. Without the mission statement providing direction, businesses may struggle when it comes to making decisions and planning for the future. This is why providing direction could be considered one of the most advantageous points of a mission statement.

Clear purpose: Having a clear purpose can remove any potential ambiguities that may surround the existence of a business. People who are interested in the progression of the business, such as stakeholders, will want to know that the business is making the right choices and progressing more towards achieving their goals, which will help to remove any doubt the stakeholders may have in the business.

A mission statement can act as a motivational tool within an organisation, and it can allow employees to all work towards one common goal that benefits both the organisation and themselves. This can help with factors such as employee satisfaction and productivity. It is important that employees feel a sense of purpose. Giving them this sense of purpose will allow them to focus more on their daily tasks and help them realise the goals of the organisation and their role.

== Disadvantages ==
Although it is mostly beneficial for a business to craft a good mission statement, there are some situations where a mission statement can be considered pointless or not useful to a business.

Unrealistic: In some cases, mission statements can be too optimistic, sapping the performance and morale of the employees. Inability to meet too high a standard could demotivate employees in the long term. Unrealistic mission statements also serve no purpose and can be considered a waste of management's time.

Poor decisions could be made in an attempt to achieve unrealistic goals, which have the potential to harm the business, and waste of both time and resources, which could be better spent on much more important tasks within the organisation such as decision-making for the business.

== Designing a statement ==
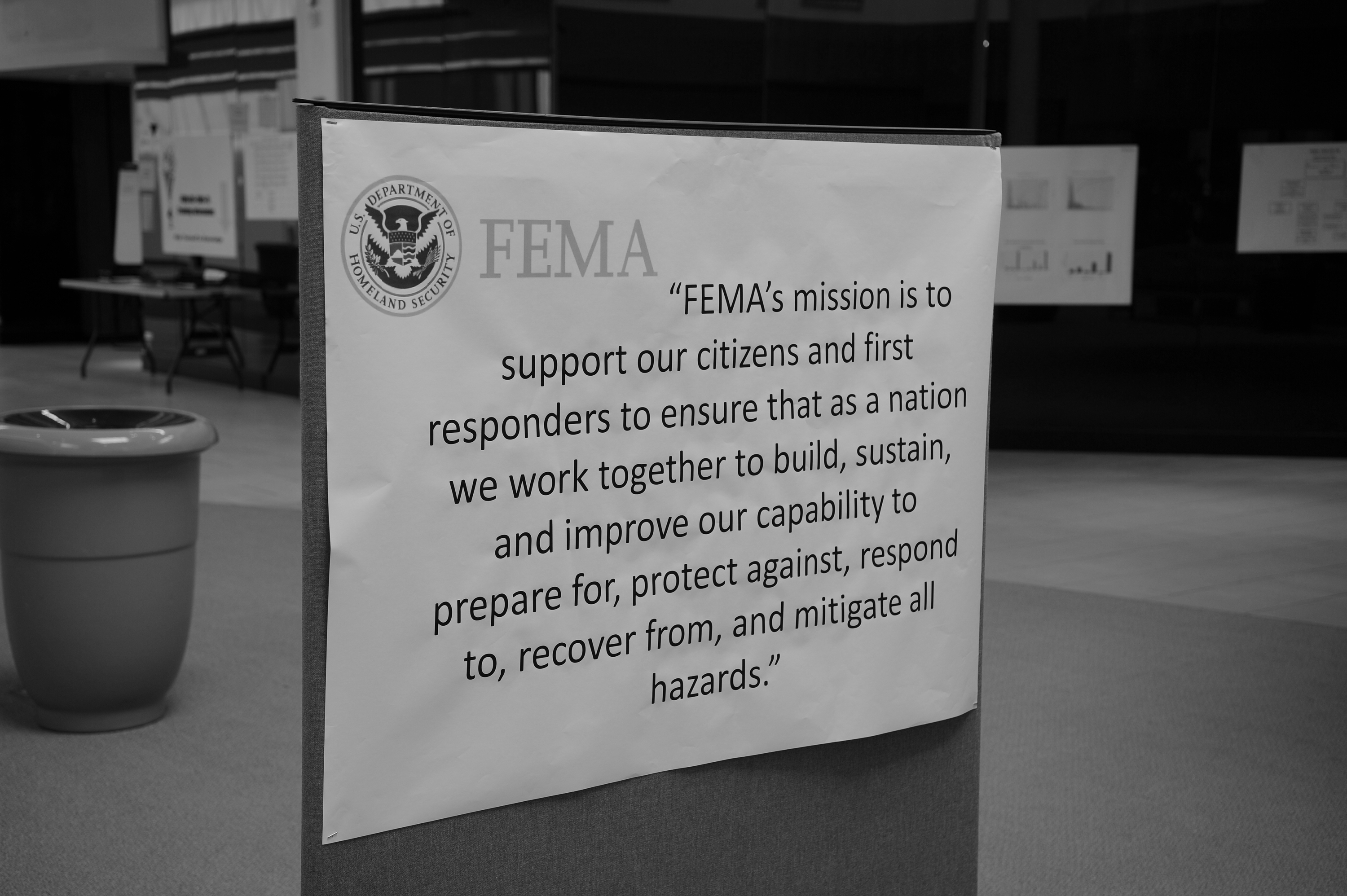
US Federal Emergency Management Agency's Mission Statement Poster

Richard Branson has commented on ways of crafting a good mission statement; he explains the importance of having a mission statement that is clear and straight to the point and does not contain unnecessary waffle. He went on to analyse a mission statement, using Yahoo's mission statement at the time (2013) as an example. In his evaluation of the mission statement, he seemed to suggest that while the statement sounded interesting, most people would not be able to understand the message it is putting across. In other words, the message of the mission statement potentially meant nothing to the audience.

== See also ==
- Strategic planning
- Strategy Markup Language
- Vision statement
