= Strategic planning software =

Strategic planning software is a category of software that covers a wide range of strategic topics, methodologies, modeling and reporting.

== Types ==
Loosely speaking, the software can be categorized into the following types:

- Small business oriented strategic- and business planning. Here, the focus is primarily upon developing goals, a business plan and a financial projection.
- Large business oriented strategic planning software. This particular category - with outputs overlapping and extending the previous - is often customized by a company and may consist of multiple elements that can cover a wide range of requirements. Word processing and spreadsheet templates are common in this area. Consolidation is often a critical aspect of this domain with a variety of enterprise software, OLAP (On Line Analytical Processing or multi-dimensional spreadsheets) and databases used. ROLAP combines relational and multi-dimensional capabilities. In recent years, reporting software has gained the label, business intelligence or BI software. Dashboards, first made popular by the idea of the balanced scorecard are common means of reporting on multiple dimensions of ongoing performance.
- Execution oriented software that is focused more upon cascading the implementation of strategic plans and is often similar in functionality to project portfolio management, agile and project management software.
- Scenario planning software. While a small category, software for supporting scenario analysis does exist. It tends to be relatively simple in nature due to the belief of many scenario facilitators that scenarios should be more stories than numerical models. Currently (2013 on), there is an emerging trend of using modeling to support and analyse the consequences of particular scenarios.
- Simulations and war-games. It may seem strange to include computer simulation and war-games as strategic planning software. The rationale however, comes out of both military strategic planning and also the emergence of strategic management as a concept in the 1980s. The assumption behind strategic management was that separation of planning from execution was ineffective, so strategic planning should be devolved in the organization to those who would ultimately execute the plan. Simulations and wargames became a way of sharing knowledge about markets and provide a cognitive frame for decision making.
- Predictive software and models. There is a long history in strategic planning of the use of predictive models. In the 1970s, the Strategic Planning Institute collected data on the performance of business units at its subscribers. The resulting Profit Impact of Market Strategy (PIMS) model was very influential with its key insights about the value of having highest or second highest market share in improving profitability and return on equity. Harvard Business School professor, Michael Porter's influential book, Competitive Strategy was based upon this data.
- Expert system based strategy evaluation systems. The first, managerial expert system, Alacrity was developed by Allstar Advice Inc. in 1985 and 1986 and launched in 1987. by associated company, Alacritous Inc. which later changed its name to Alacrity Inc. It contained a 3,000 rule expert system that used concepts of market life cycle, Porter 5-Forces model, Utterback and Abernathy innovation models, generic strategy, and learning curves to make predictions about market evolution.
- Packaging of major consulting firms' methodologies for strategic analysis as a component of the strategic planning process. Typically narrow in focus and don't encompass a full set of planning, execution and monitoring processes.

== Initial vision ==
The initial concept behind strategic planning software was the product of two different trends.

First, in the 1980s, the increasing availability of personal computers lowered the barriers to software development and made computers increasingly available to more managers. But it's worth remembering that even in 1987, selling strategic planning software often required selling a manager a computer and training them how to use productivity software (i.e. word processing, spreadsheets, graphics, outlining, etc.) Laptops were initially nonexistent and the state of art in portability was a sewing machine sized luggable computer. Previously, report creation often required hand writing or dictation which was then typed up by a secretary or word processing pool.

Second, in the early days of strategic planning concepts were few. Concepts typically included decentralization (e.g. formation of strategic business units or SBUs), relatively simplistic portfolio analysis (e.g. BCG dogs/stars/cash cow/"?" categorization), and were frequently capital and operating budgeting oriented. As a result, strategic planning software was relatively simple to create via word processing templates, graphical outputs and budgeting models.

In this approach the vision was to create a computer application that aids in a strategic planning process. The user was to be guided through the steps of the planning process. The process of guidance existed at several potential levels: (1) the furnishing of templates with categories of information that ought to be created, which implicitly suggests analysis, (2) help systems that educate users about definitions, processes, concepts, managerial models, (3) more workflow oriented interactions where inputs are manipulated, summarized or aggregated by the software. Software of this type may use questionnaires, categorical judgments, financial or market modeling and in rare cases rule based expert systems.

As a general rule, off the shelf applications are rarely successful except for relatively unskilled entrepreneurs lacking a formal business education, which perhaps accounts for the software's lack of commercial success. The most commonly used strategic planning tools and techniques tend to be relatively simple and the models used have a high level of abstraction requiring diligent interpretation and modification by participants. Systems that promise answers, e.g. rule based systems often create more value from the questioning process than from the actual answer produced in the same way that planning as an activity educates users and this education is often more important than the actual plan itself.

SWOT analysis (strengths, weaknesses, opportunities, threats) is a good example of a heuristic that is useful but also easy to misapply. Cascading of action plans makes intuitive sense but is frequently done in such a way as to demotivate employees. Because of the difficulty of combining strategic planning, strategic management, portfolio management, information technology strategy's congruence with business strategy, implementation monitoring, scenarios and contingency planning, risk analysis, balanced scorecard specifically and dashboards generally, the strategy process tends to be difficult to deal with comprehensively in a single software package. In large companies, the constant tends to be that the financial function ends up with significant influence over the process because of the requirement to report to the Board of Directors and manage capital and operating budgets.

== Agile planning ==
One of the current trends in strategic planning is the adoption of agile or lean methodologies. By their very nature, agile frameworks tend to be strong on emphasizing employee accountability and less interested in documentation. The emergence of agile in technology areas parallels the transformation of strategic planning to strategic management. Excessive documentation becomes an obstacle to revision as new information is gained about competitors, customers, distributors and suppliers. Agile's importance is driven by the faster rate of technology innovation, the lower cost of developing applications, the increase in the number of companies and individuals with similar capabilities, and faster learning from markets.

An excellent example of an extremely well specified agile framework is Scrum. Scrum falls into the category of a framework for autonomous work teams. Scrum approaches are now expanding outside of its initial application area in software development to other areas of business. However, Scrum tends to limit itself to prioritization rather than more traditional strategic planning processes. Unlike traditional strategic planning which was frequently tied to the annual budgeting process, Scrum is more iterative. Scrum projects have daily, iterative phase or "sprint" planning, and release planning which represents something akin to multi-generational product or strategy plan.

Traditionally, strategic planning was done 3–6 months prior to the beginning of the budget year, which ensured that decision making lagged market trends. Strategic management where the strategic planning process was pushed down in the organization has tended to follow this approach, the new variable being the accountability for both plan development and execution. Agile and more project oriented approaches work well in start-ups that lack the bureaucracy of larger companies, but they too always run into the issue of updating operating and capital budgets, along with risk profiles.

== See also ==
- List of project management software
- Decision making software
- Automated planning software
