= Adversary =

An adversary is generally considered to be a person, group, or force that opposes and/or attacks.

Adversary may also refer to:

- Satan ("adversary" in Hebrew), in Abrahamic religions

== Entertainment ==
=== Fiction ===
- Adversary (comics), villain from the Marvel comics universe
- The mysterious antagonist who invaded the homelands in the comic book series Fables

=== Music ===
- Ad·ver·sary, Canadian industrial musician

== Law ==
- Adversarial system, a system of law commonly used in common-law countries
- Adversary proceeding, proceeding used in bankruptcy processes

== Science ==
- Adversarial collaboration, a scientific experiment

=== Computer science ===
- Adversary (cryptography), a malicious entity in cryptography whose aim is to prevent the users of the cryptosystem from achieving their goal
- Adversary model, in online algorithms, used to show competitiveness of randomized algorithms
- Adversarial alignment, when an adversarial users constructs inputs that bypass AI alignment

== Other ==
- Adversarial purchasing, in business strategic management

== See also ==
- The Adversary (disambiguation)
- Opposition (disambiguation)
- Enemy
