= Intelligent Enterprise =

- Editor-in-chief: Doug Henschen; Justin Kestelyn
- Founding editor: Dave Stodder
- Technology editor: Penny Crosman
- Web editor: Antone Gonsalves
- Categories: Computing magazine
- Frequency: Business
- Total circulation: 100,000 (1998)
- Founder: David M. Kalman
- First issue: 1998; 28 years ago
- Final issue Number: January 2007; 19 years ago Vol 10 No 1
- Company: CMP Media, LLC
- Country: United States
- Based in: San Mateo, California
- Language: English
- Website: bibpurl.oclc.org/web/14525 intelligententerprise.com archive.org/details/pub_intelligent-enterprise
- ISSN: 1524-3621

Intelligent Enterprise (CMP Media, LLC) was the title of a magazine for business and IT executives who develop and manage their companies' strategic enterprise systems. This magazine expanded on earlier intelligent enterprise concepts, focusing on analytical software tools and underlying technologies for organizing both intellectual assets and transactional data. The print edition ended in February 2007 and the title is used now as a website. Doug Henschen is editor in chief and Antone Gonsalves is web editor.

== History and profile ==
Founded at Miller Freeman, Inc., (San Francisco) in 1998, by David M. Kalman, the magazine merged two titles, Database Programming and Design magazine and DBMS magazine. Founding editor/editorial director was David Stodder, who left the magazine in early 2007, with founding editor-in-chief Justin Kestelyn, Senior Editor Jeanette Burriesci, and Design Director Jim Shinnick. In 1999, Miller Freeman merged into CMP Media (Manhasset, New York), a division of United Business Media plc.

Intelligent Enterprise ceased publication in February 2007.
