= Strategic assumptions =

Foundation for strategic scenario planning process

Strategic assumptions are the assumptions that are held by decision-makers when building a strategic plan. All strategic plans should be built upon a grounded, validated and accepted set of strategic assumptions. Any strategic plan or decision is only as good as the strategic assumptions upon which it is based. Strategic assumptions surface and are usually identified when scenario planning is undertaken during a strategic planning process. The strategic assumptions surfacing and testing method (SAST) is one rigorous method of identifying strategic assumptions.

Like other types of assumptions, strategic assumptions are the assumptions held by decision-makers about different types of factors and drivers of change that have influenced their thinking, decision-making or planning. Strategic assumptions may be assumptions about events that happened in the past, what is currently happening or what may happen in the future.

There are nine categories of strategic assumptions. These nine types are the assumptions being made about:

1. macro-environmental forces (from a STEP or PEST analysis),
2. the market dynamics (e.g. from an analysis of the Porter's Five Forces model),
3. the needs of customers,
4. the expectations and behaviours of other stakeholders,
5. the availability and allocation of money,
6. the organization's internal processes,
7. the strengths and weaknesses of its assets,
8. its workforce, and
9. the "Background of Shared Obviousness", that is, the groupthink that exists within the organization around what the company is, what it is able to do and not able to do.

Strategic assumptions are the equivalent in strategic planning to financial assumptions when doing financial projections, economic assumptions when making economic forecasts and scientific assumptions when proposing new scientific models.
