= Balanced scorecard =

Strategy performance management tool

A balanced scorecard is a strategy performance management tool – a well-structured report used to keep track of the execution of activities by staff and to monitor the consequences arising from these actions.

The term 'balanced scorecard' primarily refers to a performance management report used by a management team, and typically focused on managing the implementation of a strategy or operational activities. In a 2020 survey 88% of respondents reported using the balanced scorecard for strategy implementation management, and 63% for operational management. Although less common, the balanced scorecard is also used by individuals to track personal performance; only 17% of respondents in the survey reported using balanced scorecards in this way. However it is clear from the same survey that a larger proportion (about 30%) use corporate balanced scorecard elements to inform personal goal setting and incentive calculations.

The critical characteristics that define a balanced scorecard are:

- its focus on the strategic agenda of the organization/coalition concerned;
- a focused set of measurements to monitor performance against objectives;
- a mix of financial and non-financial data items (originally divided into four "perspectives" - Financial, Customer, Internal Process, and Learning & Growth); and,
- a portfolio of initiatives designed to impact performance of the measures/objectives.

== Use ==
The balanced scorecard was initially proposed as a general purpose performance management system. Subsequently, it was promoted specifically as an approach to strategic performance management. The balanced scorecard has more recently become a key component of structured approaches to corporate strategic management.

Two of the ideas that underpin modern balanced scorecard designs concern making it easier to select which data to observe, and ensuring that the choice of data is consistent with the ability of the observer to intervene.

== History ==
Organizations have used systems consisting of a mix of financial and non-financial measures to track progress for quite some time. One such system, the Analog Devices Balanced Scorecard, was created by Art Schneiderman in 1987 at Analog Devices, a mid-sized semi-conductor company. Schneiderman's design was similar to what is now recognised as a "First Generation" balanced scorecard design.

In 1990, Schneiderman participated in an unrelated research study led by Robert S. Kaplan in conjunction with US management consultancy Nolan-Norton, and during this study described his work on performance measurement. Subsequently, Kaplan and David P. Norton included anonymous details of this balanced scorecard design in a 1992 article. Although Kaplan and Norton's article was not the only paper on the topic published in early 1992, it was a popular success, and was quickly followed by a second in 1993. In 1996, the two authors published The Balanced Scorecard. These articles and the first book spread knowledge of the concept of balanced scorecards, leading to Kaplan and Norton being seen as the creators of the concept.

While the "corporate scorecard" terminology was coined by Schneiderman, the roots of performance management as an activity run deep in management literature and practice. Management historians such as Alfred Chandler suggest the origins of performance management can be seen in the emergence of the complex organization – most notably during the 19th century in the US. Other influences may include the pioneering work of General Electric on performance measurement reporting in the 1950s and the work of French process engineers (who created the tableau de bord – literally, a "dashboard" of performance measures) in the early part of the 20th century. The tool also draws strongly on the ideas of the 'resource based view of the firm' proposed by Edith Penrose. None of these influences is explicitly linked to in the original descriptions of balanced scorecard by Schneiderman, Maisel, or Kaplan & Norton.

Kaplan and Norton's first book remains their most popular. The book reflects the earliest incarnations of balanced scorecards – effectively restating the concept as described in the second Harvard Business Review article. Their second book, The Strategy Focused Organization, echoed work by others (particularly a book published the year before by Olve et al. in Scandinavia) on the value of visually documenting the links between measures by proposing the "Strategic Linkage Model" or strategy map.

As the title of Kaplan and Norton's second book highlights, even by 2000 the focus of attention among thought-leaders was moving from the design of balanced scorecards themselves, towards the use of the balanced scorecard as a focal point within a more comprehensive strategic management system. Subsequent writing on the balanced scorecard by Kaplan & Norton has focused on its uses, rather than its design (e.g. The Execution Premium in 2008, "Intelligent Design of Inclusive Growth Strategies" in 2019); many others also continue to refine the device itself (e.g. Abernethy et al.).

== Characteristics ==
The characteristic feature of the balanced scorecard and its derivatives is the presentation of a mixture of financial and non-financial measures each compared to a 'target' value within a single concise report. The report is not meant to be a replacement for traditional financial or operational reports but a succinct summary that captures the information most relevant to those reading it. It is the method by which this 'most relevant' information is determined (i.e., the design processes used to select the content) that most differentiates the various versions of the tool in circulation. The balanced scorecard indirectly also provides a useful insight into an organization's strategy – by requiring general strategic statements (e.g. mission, vision) to be precipitated into more specific/tangible forms.

The first versions of Kaplan and Norton's interpretation of the balanced scorecard asserted that relevance should derive from the corporate strategy, and proposed design methods that focused on choosing measures and targets associated with the main activities required to implement the strategy. As the initial audience for this were the readers of the Harvard Business Review, the proposal was translated into a form that made sense to a typical reader of that journal – managers of US commercial businesses. Accordingly, initial designs were encouraged to measure three categories of non-financial measure in addition to financial outputs – those of "customer," "internal business processes" and "learning and growth." These categories were not so relevant to public sector or non-profit organizations, or units within complex organizations (which might have high degrees of internal specialization), and much of the early literature on balanced scorecard focused on suggestions of alternative 'perspectives' that might have more relevance to these groups (e.g. Butler et al. (1997), Ahn (2001), Elefalke (2001), Brignall (2002), Irwin (2002), Radnor et al. (2003)).

Modern balanced scorecards have evolved since the initial ideas proposed in the late 1980s and early 1990s and are significantly improved – being both more flexible (to suit a wider range of organizational types) and more effective (as design methods have evolved to make them easier to design, and use).

== Variants ==
Since the balanced scorecard was popularized in the early 1990s, a large number of alternatives to the original 'four box' balanced scorecard promoted by Kaplan and Norton in their various articles and books have emerged. Most have very limited application, and are typically proposed either by academics as vehicles for expanding the dialogue beyond the financial bottom line – e.g. Brignall (2002) or consultants as an attempt at differentiation to promote sales of books and / or consultancy (e.g. Neely et al. (2002), Bourne (2002), Niven (2002)).

Many of the structural variations proposed are broadly similar, and a research paper published in 2004 attempted to identify a pattern in these alternatives – noting three distinct types of variation. The variations appeared to be part of an evolution of the balanced scorecard concept, and so the paper refers to these distinct types as "generations". Broadly, the original 'measures in four boxes' type design (as initially proposed by Kaplan & Norton) constitutes the 1st generation balanced scorecard design; balanced scorecard designs that include a 'strategy map' or 'strategic linkage model' (e.g. the Performance Prism, later Kaplan & Norton designs, and the Performance Driver model of Olve, Roy & Wetter (first published in Swedish, 1997; English translation, 1999,) constitute the 2nd Generation of Balanced Scorecard designs; and designs that augment the strategy map / strategic linkage model with a separate document describing the long-term outcomes sought from the strategy (the "destination statement" idea) comprise the 3rd generation balanced scorecard design.

Variants that feature adaptations of the structure of the balanced scorecard to suit better a particular viewpoint or agenda are numerous. Examples of the focus of such adaptations include the triple bottom line, decision support, public sector management, and health care management. The performance management elements of the UN's Results Based Management system have strong design and structural similarities to those used in the 3rd Generation Balanced Scorecard design approach.

The balanced scorecard is also linked to quality management tools and activities. Although there are clear areas of cross-over and association, the two sets of tools are complementary rather than duplicative.

The balanced scorecard is also used to support the payments of incentives, even though it was not designed for this purpose and is not particularly suited to it.

== Design ==
Design of a balanced scorecard is about the identification of a small number of financial and non-financial measures and attaching targets to them, so that when they are reviewed it is possible to determine whether current performance 'meets expectations'. By alerting managers to areas where performance deviates from expectations, they can be encouraged to focus their attention on these areas, and hopefully as a result trigger improved performance within the part of the organization they lead.

The original thinking behind a balanced scorecard was for it to be focused on information relating to the implementation of a strategy, and over time there has been a blurring of the boundaries between conventional strategic planning and control activities and those required to design a balanced scorecard. This is illustrated by the four steps required to design a balanced scorecard included in Kaplan & Norton's writing on the subject in the late 1990s:

1. Translating the vision into operational goals;
2. Communicating the vision and link it to individual performance;
3. Business planning; index setting
4. Feedback and learning, and adjusting the strategy accordingly.

These steps go beyond the simple task of identifying a small number of financial and non-financial measures, but illustrate the requirement for whatever design process is used to fit within broader thinking about how the resulting balanced scorecard will integrate with the wider business management process.

Although it helps focus managers' attention on strategic issues and the management of the implementation of strategy, it is important to remember that the balanced scorecard itself has no role in the formation of strategy. In fact, balanced scorecards can co-exist with strategic planning systems and other tools.

=== First generation ===
The first generation of balanced scorecard designs used a "four perspective" approach to identify what measures to use to track the implementation of strategy. The original four "perspectives" proposed were:

- Financial: encourages the identification of a few relevant high-level financial measures. In particular, designers were encouraged to choose measures that helped inform the answer to the question "How do we look to shareholders?". Examples: cash flow, sales growth, operating income, return on equity.
- Customer: encourages the identification of measures that answer the question "What is important to our customers and stakeholders?". Examples: percent of sales from new products, on time delivery, share of important customers’ purchases, ranking by important customers.
- Internal business processes: encourages the identification of measures that answer the question "What must we excel at?". Examples: cycle time, unit cost, yield, new product introductions.
- Learning and growth: encourages the identification of measures that answer the question "How can we continue to improve, create value and innovate?". Examples: time to develop new generation of products, life cycle to product maturity, time to market versus competition.

The idea was that managers used these perspective headings to prompt the selection of a small number of measures that informed on that aspect of the organization's strategic performance. The perspective headings show that Kaplan and Norton were thinking about the needs of non-divisional commercial organizations in their initial design. These categories were not so relevant to public sector or non-profit organizations, or units within complex organizations (which might have high degrees of internal specialization), and much of the early literature on balanced scorecard focused on suggestions of alternative 'perspectives' that might have more relevance to these groups (e.g. Butler et al. (1997), Ahn (2001), Elefalke (2001), Brignall (2002), Irwin (2002), Flamholtz (2003), Radnor et al. (2003)).

These suggestions were notably triggered by a recognition that different but equivalent headings would yield alternative sets of measures, and this represents the major design challenge faced with this type of balanced scorecard design: justifying the choice of measures made. "Of all the measures you could have chosen, why did you choose these?" These issues contribute to dis-satisfaction with early balanced scorecard designs, since if users are not confident that the measures within the balanced scorecard are well chosen, they will have less confidence in the information it provides.

Although less common, these early-style balanced scorecards are still designed and used today.

In short, first generation balanced scorecards are hard to design in a way that builds confidence that they are well designed. Because of this, many are abandoned soon after completion.

=== Second generation ===
In the mid-1990s, an improved design method emerged. In the new method, measures are selected based on a set of "strategic objectives" plotted on a "strategic linkage model" or "strategy map". With this modified approach, the strategic objectives are distributed across the four measurement perspectives, so as to "connect the dots" to form a visual presentation of strategy and measures.

In this modified version of balanced scorecard design, managers select a few strategic objectives within each of the perspectives, and then define the cause-effect chain among these objectives by drawing links between them to create a "strategic linkage model". A balanced scorecard of strategic performance measures is then derived directly by selecting one or two measures for each strategic objective. This type of approach provides greater contextual justification for the measures chosen, and is generally easier for managers to work through. This style of balanced scorecard has been commonly used since 1996 or so: it is significantly different in approach to the methods originally proposed, and so can be thought of as representing the "2nd generation" of design approach adopted for the balanced scorecard since its introduction.

=== Third generation ===
In the late 1990s, the design approach had evolved yet again. One problem with the "second generation" design approach described above was that the plotting of causal links amongst twenty or so medium-term strategic goals was still a relatively abstract activity. In practice it ignored the fact that opportunities to intervene to influence strategic goals are (and need to be) anchored in current and real management activity. Secondly, the need to "roll forward" and test the impact of these goals necessitated the reference to an additional design instrument: a statement of what "strategic success", or the "strategic end-state", looked like (which in turn would be related to the organization's Mission or Vision Statement). This reference point was called a Destination Statement. It was quickly realized that if a Destination Statement was created at the beginning of the design process then it became easier to select the appropriate strategic activity and outcome objectives which if achieved would deliver it. Measures and targets could then be selected to track the achievement of these objectives. Design methods that incorporate a Destination Statement or equivalent (e.g. the results-based management method proposed by the UN in 2002) represent a tangibly different design approach to those that went before and so have been proposed as representing a "third generation" design method for balanced scorecards.

Design methods for balanced scorecards continue to evolve and adapt to reflect the deficiencies in the currently used methods, and the particular needs of communities of interest (e.g. NGOs and government departments have found the third generation methods embedded in results-based management more useful than first or second generation design methods).

Third generation balanced scorecards improved the utility of second generation of balanced scorecards, giving more relevance and functionality to strategic objectives. The major difference is the incorporation of Destination Statements. Other key components are strategic objectives, strategic linkage model and perspectives, measures and initiatives (which are broadly similar to those found in 2nd Generation designs).

== Popularity ==
In 1997, Kurtzman found that 64 percent of the companies questioned were measuring performance from a number of perspectives in a similar way to the balanced scorecard. Balanced scorecards have been implemented by government agencies, military units, business units and corporations as a whole, non-profit organizations, and schools.

The balanced scorecard has been widely adopted, and consistently has been found to be the most popular performance management framework in a widely respected annual survey (e.g. see results from 2003 and 2013).

Theorists have argued from the earliest days of discussion of balanced scorecard usage that much of the benefit of it comes from the design process itself. Indeed, it is argued that many failures in the early days of the balanced scorecard could be attributed to this problem, in that early balanced scorecards were often designed remotely by consultants – it is suggested that because they were not being involved in the design the managers who were intended to use the device did not trust its design (e.g. it measured the wrong things and used inappropriate targets) and so failed to engage with and use the devices.

== Criticism ==
Academic criticism of the balanced scorecard can be broken into three distinct (but overlapping) areas of concern.

1. Lack of rigour: The first kind of criticism focuses on the empirical nature of the framework and the lack of any formal validation of the ideas it is based on in the early articles that introduced the concept. Kaplan and Norton notoriously failed to include any citations of earlier articles in their initial papers on the topic, an absence noted, for example, by Norreklit. Others identified technical flaws in the methods and design of the original balanced scorecard or concerning the lack of validation for the approach – for example Flamholtz observed that no validation was provided for the choice of the "four perspectives" of the 1st Generation design - a shortcoming addressed in 2nd and 3rd Generation Balanced Scorecard design principles
2. Lack of an overall score: The second kind of criticism is that the balanced scorecard does not provide an overall score or a unified view of performance with clear recommendations: it is simply a list of metrics that managers have to interpret before deciding upon appropriate interventions (e.g. Jensen 2001). These critics usually include in their criticism suggestions about how an 'unanswered' question they identify in their commentary could be answered, but typically the unanswered question relate to things outside the scope of balanced scorecard itself (such as developing strategies) (e.g. Brignall)
3. Not reflective of all stakeholder needs: The third kind of criticism is that the model fails to fully reflect the needs of stakeholders – putting bias on financial stakeholders over others. Early forms of Balanced Scorecard proposed by Kaplan & Norton were orientated towards the needs of commercial organizations in the USA – where a focus on investment return was appropriate. This focus was maintained through subsequent revisions. Even now over 20 years after they were first proposed, the four most common perspectives in Balanced Scorecard designs mirror the four proposed in the original Kaplan & Norton paper. There have been many studies that suggest other perspectives might better reflect the priorities of organizations – particularly but not exclusively relating to the needs of organizations in the public and non-governmental sectors. For instance, the balanced scorecard does not address important aspects of nonprofit strategy such as social dimensions, human resource elements, political issues and the distinctive nature of competition and collaboration in nonprofit settings. More modern design approaches such as 3rd Generation Balanced Scorecard, the Public Sector Scorecard and the UN's Results Based Management methods explicitly consider the interests of wider stakeholder groups and perhaps address this issue in its entirety.

In response to these concerns there have been many studies seeking to provide (retrospective) academic underpinnings for the Balanced Scorecard concept, and to provide case study and validation information for the various design generations.

There are relatively few reliable assessments of the effectiveness of the approaches embodied in the balanced scorecard, but some studies demonstrate a link between the use of balanced scorecards and better decision making or improved financial performance of companies. Broadcast surveys of usage have difficulties in this respect, due to the wide variations in definition of 'what a balanced scorecard is' (making it hard to work out in a survey if you are comparing like with like). Single organization case studies suffer from the 'lack of a control' issue common to any study of organizational change – what the organization would have achieved if the change had not been made isn't known, so it is difficult to attribute changes observed over time to a single intervention (such as introducing a balanced scorecard). However, such studies as have been done have typically found Balanced Scorecard to be useful.

Consideration has been given to the effect of organization size on balanced scorecard effectiveness:

- For large organizations this work has focused on how to translate aggregate corporate strategies into performance management tools relevant to individual teams / units within the organization. The idea of developing an aligned hierarchical set of Balanced Scorecards that each are relevant to the issues faced by and activities of an associated organisational sub-group has long featured in the documentation linked to 3rd Generation Balanced Scorecard designs.
- In small and medium-sized enterprises (SMEs), the balanced scorecard has been found to be effective, but that focus is required on balancing design complexity and relevance with the availability of resource to do the design work. Others have argued that the balanced scorecard is unsuitable for SMEs for a variety of reasons, including the belief that SMEs lack a long-term strategic focus (Hvolby and Thorstenson (2000), McAdam (2000)) and that SMEs have limited knowledge about performance measurement in general (Rantanen and Holtari 2000) and therefore do not recognise the benefits that might accrue from use of the tool (McAdam 2000; Bourne 2001), but it is also important to note that none of these studies attempts to theorise the reasons behind their negative findings.

== Software tools ==
The balanced scorecard by definition is not a complex thing – typically no more than about 20 measures spread across a mix of financial and non-financial topics, and easily reported manually (on paper, or using simple office software).

The processes of collecting, reporting, and distributing balanced scorecard information can be labor-intensive and prone to procedural problems (for example, getting all relevant people to return the information required by the required date). The simplest mechanism to use is to delegate these activities to an individual, and many balanced scorecards are reported via ad hoc methods based around email, phone calls and office software.

In more complex organizations, where there are multiple balanced scorecards to report and/or a need for co-ordination of results between balanced scorecards (for example, if one level of reports relies on information collected and reported at a lower level) the use of individual reporters is problematic. Where these conditions apply, organizations use balanced scorecard reporting software to automate the production and distribution of these reports.

== See also ==
- Balanced scorecard SWOT
- Digital dashboard, also known as business dashboard, enterprise dashboard or executive dashboard
- Key performance indicators
- Marketing strategy
- Performance management
- Strategic control
- Strategic management
- Strategy map
