= Strategic control =

Organizational management process

Strategic control is the process used by organizations to control the formation and execution of strategic plans; it is a specialised form of management control, and differs from other forms of management control (in particular from operational control) in respects of its need to handle uncertainty and ambiguity at various points in the control process.

Strategic control is also focused on the achievement of future goals, rather than the evaluation of past performance. Vis:

The purpose of control at the strategic level is not to answer the question:' 'Have we made the right strategic choices at some time in the past?" but rather "How well are we doing now and how well will we be doing in the immediate future for which reliable information is available?" The point is not to bring to light past errors but to identify needed corrections to steer the corporation in the desired direction. And this determination must be made with respect to currently desirable long-range goals and not against the goals or plans that were established at some time in the past.

As with other control processes, strategic control processes are at their core cybernetic in nature: using one or more 'closed loop' controls to ensure that any observed deviations from expected activity or outcomes are highlighted to managers who can then intervene to correct / adjust the organisation's future activities. John Preble noted the need for these controls to be 'forward looking' when used to control strategy, to give controls that are "future-directed and anticipatory".

Strategic control systems cannot "...wait for a strategy to be executed before getting any feedback on how well it is working. Since this might take several years..."

A related concern for strategic control processes is the amount of time and effort required for the process to work: if either is too great the process will either be ineffective or be ignored by the organisation.

Various authors have proposed that all strategic control systems necessarily comprise a small set of standard elements, the absence of any one of which makes strategic control impossible to achieve (e.g. Goold & Quinn, Muralidharan). The four elements proposed by Muralidharan are:

- the articulation of the strategic outcomes being sought
- the description of the strategic activities to be carried out (attached to specific managed resources) in pursuit of the required outcomes
- the definition of a method to track progress made against these two elements (usually via the monitoring of a small number of performance measures and associated target values)
- the identification of an effective intervention mechanism that would allow observers (usually the organisation's managers) to change / correct / adjust the organisation's activities when targets are not achieved.

These elements imply an active involvement by senior managers in the determination of the strategic activities pursued by the component parts of an organisation, and this has led some to observe that strategic control is most effective in organisations that focus on a single market or area of activity. In organisations undertaking a mix of diverse / unrelated activities (e.g. traditional conglomerates) simpler forms of financial control are more common and perhaps more effective.

== History ==
Although control was one of the six 'functions of management' listed by Henri Fayol in 1917, the idea of strategic control as a distinct activity does not appear in the management literature until the late 1970s (e.g. "Strategic Control: a new task for top management" by J H Horovitz, which was published in 1979, is a candidate for first paper to explicitly discuss the topic), but the first definition of strategic control in a form consistent with modern usage of the term is probably in a paper by Reufli and Sarrazin published in 1981.

As Reufli and Sarrazin observed, the key issue with strategic control mechanisms is the need to deal with uncertainty and ambiguity. A landmark study by Michael Goold and Andrew Campbell identified that a variety of control methods are used across a continuum ranging from purely financial controls at one extreme, through to detailed strategic planning systems at the other. They observed a series of trade-offs between these extremes – financial controls being simpler and therefore cheaper and more flexible to operate, but providing less scope for co-ordination between components of an organisation, strategic planning being time-consuming and expensive to operate, but providing the greatest scope to push for maximum strategic advantage. In the middle of this range, Goold and Campbell described strategic control as allowing firms to "balance competitive and financial ambitions". This idea of a spectrum of control has since been widely adopted.

== Links to other tools ==
Although strategic control is a general management topic rather than a prescriptive tool, its reliance on feedback on organisational performance has resulted in a long association with performance management tools such as the balanced scorecard and its derivatives such as the Performance Prism, and with related strategy implementation / execution frameworks such as the ACME framework, the five step process that proposed by Hrebiniak and Joyce., or the approach proposed by Kaplan and Norton in 2001.
