= Strategy implementation =

Strategy implementation is the activities within a workplace or organisation designed to manage the activities associated with the delivery of a strategic plan.

== Definition ==
There are several definitions, most of which relate to the process of managing activities associated with the delivery of a strategic plan such as the following:

- The sum total of the activities and choices required for the execution of a strategic plan
- Operationalisation of a clearly articulated strategic plan
- All the processes and outcomes which accrue to a strategic decision once authorisation has been to go ahead and put the decision into practice
- A series of interventions concerning organisational structures, key personnel actions, and control systems designed to control performance with respect to desired ends.

Other definitions concern the processes by which an organisation identifies and allocates the actions associated with the delivery of a strategic plan such as the following:

- A process by which large, complex, and potentially unmanageable strategic problems are factored into progressively smaller, less complex, and hence more manageable proportions.
- The managerial interventions that align organisational action with strategic intention (Floyd and Wooldridge, 1992).

The term first became well known following the publication in 1984 of "Strategy Implementation," a highly regarded book on the topic by Lawrence G. Hrebiniak and William F. Joyce, and it is no surprise that definitions from that work appear in both of the lists given above.

Strategy implementation thinking has strongly influenced writing and work on the related topic of Strategy execution - a term that has been used to associate strategy implementation with the Balanced Scorecard approach to strategic performance management.

== Process ==
Most authors propose specific activities and systems that they think are necessary to effectively implement a strategy (e.g. Hrebiniak and Joyce, 1984; Reed and Buckley, 1988; Wheelen and Hunger, 1992).

Strategy implementation requires the following activities to be undertaken:

- Strategy articulation - Building consensus within the team responsible for delivery of the strategy about the outcomes to be achieved
- Strategy validation - Engaging with stakeholders and others to confirm strategic outcomes being pursued are acceptable
- Strategy communication - Convert strategic objectives into clear short-term operating objectives that can be assigned to groups for delivery
- Strategy monitoring - Monitor the progress of the organisation in delivering the strategic objectives
- Strategy engagement - Managerial interventions designed to ensure organisation successfully achieves chosen strategic outcomes

=== Strategy articulation ===
The purpose of articulating the strategy is to translate the strategy into a form where managers and stakeholders agree consensually on what needs to be achieved

The strategy articulation will describe the strategic outcomes to be achieved, preferably expressed in the form of quantitative or qualitative goals. This strategy articulation can, for example, be expressed in the form of a Destination Statement.

=== Strategy validation ===
Validating the strategy is an essential part of the implementation (see also Heide et al., 2002; Kotter, 1995; Hambrick, 1981). This validation can be both internal to the organisation or external. In addition, when implementing a strategy, the human aspect also needs to be considered. And an implementation can be done only if the organisational members are engaged.

==== Internal validation ====
Validation of the strategy is needed from within the organisation - in particular from members of the organisation with implementation responsibilities. Organisational members must be aware of and support the strategic goals of the firm (Kotter and Schlesinger, 1979). Without this knowledge of the strategy, organisational members will not be able to place the strategy being implemented within a broader context and assess its importance.

One way the communication can be done, is by cascading down the strategy into the organisation, where the strategic activities and outcomes are broken down into smaller set of change programmes and operational goals specific for each management teams, with the focus to achieve them in the near term - combining critical operational outcomes with the most urgently required change initiatives. This kind of validation overlaps with strategy communication activities (see below).

==== External validation ====
Sometimes, especially in non-commercial organisations, it is also necessary to confirm strategic goals with external stakeholders (Hambrick and Cannella, 1989; and Nielsen, 1983): in commercial organisations it is common for the achievement of financial outcomes to be used to guide strategic choices, but this does not diminish the need for validation with other key stakeholders (e.g. regulators, key customers etc.).

=== Strategy communication ===
To be usable, a strategy needs to be translated into a set of actionable operational steps. The concrete and clear strategic objectives should be translated into operational implementation sub-objectives (Reid, 1989), be linked to departmental and individual goals (Kaplan, 1995), and be measurable (Reid, 1989). An essential part is to make sure that people understand what is they need to do and why.

In other words, the business strategy must be translated into a set of clear short-term operating objectives (activities and outcomes) in order to execute the strategy. Key issues, elements, and needs of strategy must be translated into objectives, action plans, and “scorecards” and this translation is an integral and vital part of the execution process. Developing this set of clear objectives, that relates logically to the strategy and how the organisation plans to compete, is an important aspect of an effective implementation process (Owen, 1982). Having a concrete, detailed and comprehensive implementation plan can have a positive influence on the level of success of an implementation effort. In addition it helps identify what will be required in terms of resources, capabilities and time.

Part of this strategy translation is to assign responsibilities (Owen, 1982) across the organisations members, not only as to engage them but also to monitor and control that each of the operating objectives is being taken care of.

Therefore, to achieve strategic objectives, the short-term operating objectives need to be measurable. Performance appraisal and measurement of strategic progress simply cannot function without the existence of these critical metrics or measurable performance criteria. Progress measurement points or ‘milestones’ should be established (Owen, 1982). In addition, goal setting provides a sense of direction and pace setting for the implementation effort (Reid, 1989)

The pace of the strategy implementation can affect its success:

- Dooley et al. (2000) found that strongly committed decision teams lead to more effective implementation but slows down strategy implementation.
- Implementation should occur incrementally so that organisations are not overwhelmed by trying to implement too many changes simultaneously (e.g. Leighton, 1996)
- A radical implementation pace in which large changes are quickly made may not allow organisations the time to carefully plan and execute successful reorganisations or to engage organisational member participation and commitment. moreover operations can be dramatically disrupted and other unintended consequences may occur
- The pace of the implementation: a slow implementation with small steps usually has a positive influence on implementation performance.

=== Strategy monitoring ===
Monitoring or evaluation should begin early on in order to cut an errant strategy before losses or negative impacts become too costly or damaging.

As mentioned in the Strategy translation, each short-term operating objectives needs to be associated with a measure whether it be an action plan with milestones or a metric (Owen, 1982). These small number of high-level measures with associated targets will track the implementation activities being undertaken and their consequences .

Monitoring these measures will help the organisation members in controlling that the strategy is being implemented successfully and if not in making them take decisions that will allow them to achieve the strategy. Strategy control, in turn, provides timely and valid feedback about organisational performance so that change and adaptation become a routine part of the implementation effort. Controls allow for the revision of execution-related factors if desired goals are not being met.

=== Strategy engagement ===
To achieve that there needs to be an agreed mechanism of intervention to enable the management to efficiently and effectively engage with their organisation to ensure the required actions are being carried out, and where these actions are not working as expected, to be able to change the actions as required (Amason 1996). For example, a best practice for strategy implementation monitoring and control is to meet regularly in structured and time-limited sessions (Allio, 2005).

As mentioned previously, a slow implementation with small steps usually has a positive influence on engaging the management resulting in a better implementation performance.

Implementation evaluation can have a positive influence on future implementation performance, increasing engagement using past successes or based on lessons learned.

=== Links to other tools ===
Strategic implementation is often associated with performance management. Tools such as balanced scorecard and its derivatives such as the performance measurement, or the ACME (Articulate, Communicate, Monitor and Engage) framework. can be practical and useful to successfully implement a strategy.

== Strategy implementation obstacles ==
Strategy implementations obstacles have long been studied (e.g.: Kotter and Schlesinger, 1979; Alexander, 1985). Several studies have identified a number of different implementation obstacles. These obstacles can be grouped into several categories, including leadership, time available, communication and perceptions, reluctance to change, behavioural diagnosis, peoples' skills, participation, organisational culture and climate, structure, magnitude of the strategic changes, coordination, resources, performance management and external events (Cândido and Santos, 2019). Some of the most frequently cited obstacles are:

- lack of top management commitment,
- poor choice of method for introducing the strategic changes,
- internal problems not anticipated,
- lack of communication,
- no participation and no identification with the strategic change,
- insufficient power,
- limited resources,
- inadequate control and reward systems,
- external events,
- and others.

These obstacles can interact and may lead to other obstacles, which can prevent the strategy from being implemented successfully. The rate of implementation failure has been estimated in the range of 70 to 90 percent (e.g., Kiechel, 1982; Dion et al., 2007) but these rates of failure are likely overestimated since there are other much smaller estimates not so frequently cited.
