= Intelligent enterprise =

Business performance management approach

Intelligent Enterprise is an organizational management concept that leverages knowledge and technology to improve business performance. As articulated in James Brian Quinn's book Intelligent Enterprise, the concept argues that intellect is the core resource in producing and delivering services. It goes on to say that managers are expected to provide a rewarding work environment through lower friction and energetic conduct, and that auxiliary functions should be outsourced to vendors, so that firms may focus on their core components and functions.

== Discussion ==
Ming Yingzhao and Feng Dexiong stated that "the degree to which the Intelligent Enterprise can be successful depends on the competencies of the people and its operational capabilities", such as structure, policies, and systems. Asif Gill discussed the contemporary information-driven approach that uses data, analytics, and artificial intelligence/machine learning for "architecting intelligent enterprises".

== Examples ==
=== Honda ===
During its early years, Honda competed with many other Japanese car producers, such as Toyota. Their decision to outsource many of their components to achieve economies of scale and focus more on their manufacturing operations' development and production helped them gain a competitive advantage.

=== Apple ===
When Apple retailed certain products in the highly competitive computer environment, their production costs were less than 25%, as more than 70% of their components were outsourced. Apple focused on design, logistics, software, and product assembly.

== Advantages ==
Jatinder Gupta, a professor at The University of Alabama in Huntsville and coauthor of a book on the topic, claims that the increased availability of information leads to better decision-making, which can be beneficial from a macroeconomic perspective. Gupta classifies the advantages of Intelligent Enterprises into three distinct levels: Operations, Tactics, and Strategies.

- Operations: In an operative view, intelligent enterprises set the platform which automates processes and allows the access to all data information which may have been physically and logically dispersed at one time.
- Tactical: An Intelligent Enterprise may make better and faster decisions as information is more easily accessible.
- Strategies: The reduction of operating times promotes the reduction of operating costs thus leading to better customer services. In addition, advanced business decision-making follows from better tactical strategies.

== Limitations ==
Gill Palmer, a doctoral candidate, identified a blind spot among many corporations and businesses: the lack of harmonious integration between internal operations and external interactions.
