= H. Thomas Johnson =

American accounting historian (1938–2024)

H. Thomas Johnson (April 18, 1938 – July 3, 2024) was an American accounting historian, and Professor of Business Administration at Portland State University, known for his work on the history of accounting and accounting thought

== Life and work ==
Johnson obtained his BA in economics from Harvard University and his MBA in accounting from Rutgers University. He obtained a PhD in economic history from the University of Wisconsin–Madison. He went on to earn a Certified Public Accountant license.

After graduation Johnson started as accountant at Arthur Andersen. In the early 1970s he started his academic career at the University of Western Ontario as assistant professor of economics, and by 1975 was associate professor of economics. In 1980 he was appointed professor of accounting at the Western Washington University. In 1988 he move to the Portland State University, where he was appointed professor of business administration. At the Bainbridge Graduate Institute in Washington he is also appointed distinguished consulting professor of sustainable business.

A 2003 survey by Harvard Business School Press placed him among the 200 leading management thinkers living today. The American Society for Quality awarded him the Deming Medal in 2008 (see acceptance remarks), and in 2007 he received a distinguished lifetime achievement award from the American Accounting Association.

Johnson's research interests are in the field of "the intersection of systems thinking, modern physics, and sustainable operations management [and] explor[es] the application of natural living system principles to the design of ecologically-focused local business operations that emulate and extend the scope of the Toyota Production System." Johnson died on July 3, 2024, at the age of 86.

== Selected publications ==
- Johnson, H. Thomas. Relevance lost: the rise and fall of management accounting. Harvard Business Press, 1991.
- Johnson, H. Thomas. Relevance regained. Simon and Schuster, 2002.

Articles, a selection:

- Johnson, H. Thomas, and Robert S. Kaplan. "The rise and fall of management accounting." Engineering Management Review, IEEE 15.3 (1987): 36–44.
- Johnson, H. Thomas. "It’s time to stop overselling activity-based concepts." Management Accounting 74.3 (1992): 26–35.
