= 3Cs model =

Industry model developed by Kenichi Ohmae

The 3Cs Model is an industry model which offers a strategic look at three factors needed for success. It was developed by Japanese organizational theorist Kenichi Ohmae.

== Overview ==
The 3Cs model points out that a business strategist should focus on three key factors for success. In the construction of a business strategy, three main elements must be taken into account:

1. The Company
2. The Customers
3. The Competitors

Only by integrating these three can a sustained competitive advantage exist. Ohmae refers to these key factors as the three Cs or the strategic triangle.

Customers have wants and needs. The company recognises these and offers a basic product. To cater to their expectations and also to differentiate from competitors, companies try to offer differentiated products. Similarly, competitors attempt to offer differentiated products to generate profits and growth.

There is also a new 3 Cs model emerging which centers on sustainability. This model is:

1. Capability
2. Consistency
3. Cultivation

The idea behind the new 3 Cs model revolves around the concept of shared value to the company, the environment, and the community.

== The Customer ==
Clients are the base of any strategy according to Ohmae. Therefore, the primary goal is supposed to be the interest of the customer and not those of the shareholders for example. In the long run, a company that is genuinely interested in its customers will be interesting for its investors and take care of their interests automatically. Segmentation is helping to understand the customer.

=== Segmenting by objectives ===
The differentiation is done in terms of the different ways that various customers use a product. Customer thinking is not one of the prime functions for consideration.

=== Segmenting by customer coverage ===
This segmentation normally emerges from a trade-off study of marketing costs versus market coverage. There appears always to be a point of diminishing returns in the cost versus coverage relationship. The corporation’s task is to optimize its range of market coverage, geographically and/ or channel wise.

=== Segmenting the market once more ===
In fierce competition, competitors are likely to be dissecting the market in similar ways. Over an extended period of time, the effectiveness of a given initial strategic segmentation will tend to decline. In such situations it is useful to pick a small group of customers and reexamine what it is that they are really looking for.

A market segment change occurs where the market forces are altering the distribution of the user-mix over time by influencing demography, distribution channels, customer size, etc. This kind of change means that the allocation of corporate resources must be shifted and/ or the absolute level of resources committed in the business must be changed.

== The Competitors ==
Competitor based strategies can be constructed by looking at possible sources of differentiation in functions such as: purchasing, design, engineering, sales and servicing. The following aspects show ways in order to achieve this differentiation:

=== Hito-Kane-Mono ===
A favorite phrase of Japanese business planners is hito-kane-mono, standing for people, money and things (or assets). This combination reflects the belief of some Japanese business planners that streamlined corporate management is achieved when these three critical resources are in balance without surplus or waste. For example: cash over and beyond what competent people can intelligently expend is wasted. Of the three critical resources, funds should be allocated last. The corporation should firstly allocate management talent, based on the available mono (things): plant, machinery, technology, process know-how and functional strength. Once these hito (people) have developed creative and imaginative ideas to capture the business’s upward potential, the kane (money) should be given to the specific ideas and programs generated by the individual managers.

== The Corporation (the industry) ==
=== Selectivity and sequencing ===
The corporation does not have to excel in every function to win. If it can gain a decisive edge in one key function, it will eventually be able to improve its other functions which are now average.

=== Make or buy ===
In case of rapidly rising wage costs, it becomes a critical decision for a company to subcontract a major share of its assembly operations. If its competitors are unable to shift production so rapidly to subcontractors and vendors, the resulting difference in cost structure and/or in the company's ability to cope with demand fluctuations may have significant strategic implications.

In essence, the company should seek to stay ahead of competition by either outsourcing some of its activities which are quite costly but do not have direct value addition or it should apply backward integration techniques for its core business areas.

== See also ==
5C Analysis under Situation analysis

== Bibliography ==
- Kenichi Ohmae, The Mind Of The Strategist: The Art of Japanese Business, McGraw-Hill, 1991
