= Behavioral systems analysis =

Behavioral systems analysis (BSA), or performance systems analysis, applies behavior analysis and systems analysis to human performance in organizations. BSA is directly related to performance management and organizational behavior management.

== Description ==
Behavioral systems analysis is an approach to organizational design and management. It is based on the premise that organizations are complex systems. As such, changes in one aspect of performance in an organization necessarily affects performance in another parts of an organization. A primary goal of BSA is to create a balanced applications in which areas of poor performance are improved, areas of high performance are maintained, and employee performance outcomes are directed towards organizational goals. This is done through the careful use of behavioral and systems theories, and the application of research based principles of behavior, such as reinforcement, punishment, stimulus control, discrimination and generalization.

== History ==
It began in the late 50s through the 60s by combining behavior analysis and general systems theory to better understand human and organizational performance.

== Process ==
Analyze, Specify, Design, Intervene, Evaluate, Recycle or ASDIER.

== Tools ==
Here is a list of some the tools and the last name of the author next to them:

- Behavioral Systems Engineering Model – M. Malott-2003
- Total Performance System – Brethower-1982
- Super System/Relationship Map – Rummler-1995
- Is/Should Process Maps/Task Analysis – Rummler, M. Malott
- ABC (PIC/NIC) Analysis – Daniels
- Behavior Engineering Model/6boxes/Performance Diagnostic Checklist – Gilbert, Binder, Austin-2000
- Human Performance System – Rummler
- Performance Planned and Managed System/Interlocking Contingencies at Various Management Levels/Cultural Change Model – Rummler, M. Malott, R. Malott

== Additional information ==
Here are some studies that employed BSA:

- Huberman & O'Brien (1999)
- Sulzer-Azaroff, Loafman, Merante & Hlavacek (1990)
- Sulzer-Azaroff, Pollack & Fleming (1992)
- Williams & Cummings (2001)
- Williams, Di Vittorio, & Hausherr (2002)
