= Strategy map =

Document outlining the strategic goals of an organization

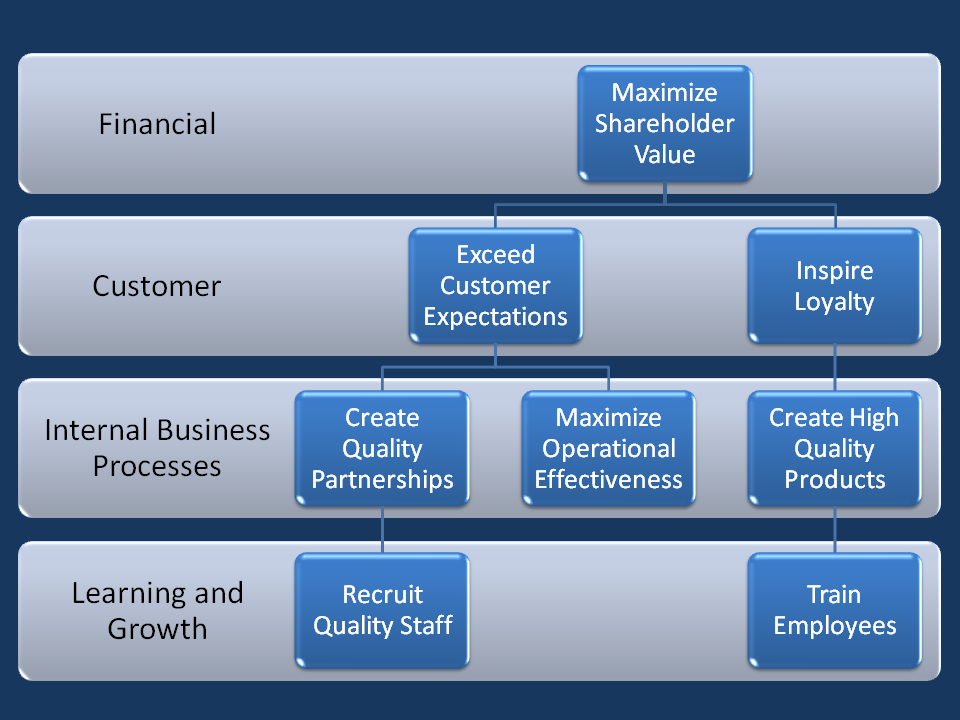
Generic Strategy Map

In management, a strategy map is a diagram that documents the strategic goals being pursued by an organization or management team. It is an element of the documentation associated with the Balanced Scorecard, and in particular is characteristic of the second generation of Balanced Scorecard designs that first appeared during the mid-1990s. The first diagrams of this type appeared in the early 1990s, and the idea of using this type of diagram to help document Balanced Scorecard was discussed in a paper by Robert S. Kaplan and David P. Norton in 1996.

The strategy map idea featured in several books and articles during the late 1990s by Robert S. Kaplan and David P. Norton. Their original book in 1996, "The Balanced Scorecard, Translating strategy into action", contained diagrams which are later called strategy maps, but at this time they did not refer to them as such. Kaplan & Norton's second book, The Strategy Focused Organization, explicitly refers to strategy maps and includes a chapter on how to build them. At this time, they said that "the relationship between the drivers and the desired outcomes constitute the hypotheses that define the strategy". Their Third book, Strategy Maps, goes into further detail about how to describe and visualise the strategy using strategy maps.

The Kaplan and Norton approach to strategy maps has:

- An underlying framework of horizontal perspectives arranged in a cause and effect relationship, typically Financial, Customer, Process and Learning & Growth
- Objectives within those perspectives. Each objective as text appearing within a shape (usually an oval or rectangle). Relatively few objectives (usually fewer than 20)
- Vertical sets of linked objectives that span the perspectives. These are called strategic themes.
- Clear cause-and-effect relationships between these objectives, across the perspectives. The strategic themes represent hypotheses about how the strategy will bring about change to the outcomes of the organisation.

Across a broader range of published sources, a looser approach is sometimes used. In these approaches, there are only a few common attributes. Some approaches use a more broad causal relationships between objectives shown with arrows that either join objectives together, or placed in a way not linked with specific objectives but to provide general euphemistic indications of where causality lies. For instance, Olve and Wetter, in their 1999 book Performance Drivers, also describe early performance driver models, but do not refer to them as strategy maps.

The purpose of the strategy map in Balanced Scorecard design, and its emergence as a design aid, is discussed in some detail in a research paper on the evolution of Balanced Scorecard designs during the 1990s by Lawrie & Cobbold.

== Origin of strategy maps ==
The Balanced Scorecard is a framework used to help in the design and implementation of strategic performance management tools within organizations.

One of the major challenges in the design of Balanced Scorecard-based performance management systems is deciding which activities and outcomes to monitor. By providing a simple visual representation of the strategic objectives to be focused on, along with additional visual cues in the form of perspectives and causal arrows, the strategy map has been found useful in facilitating discussions within a management team about which objectives to choose and, subsequently, in supporting discussions of the actual performance achieved.

== Perspectives ==
Very early Balanced Scorecard articles by Robert S. Kaplan and David P. Norton proposed a simple design method for choosing the content of the Balanced Scorecard based on answers to four generic questions about the strategy to be pursued by the organization. These four questions, one about finances, one about marketing, one about processes, and one about organizational development evolved quickly into a standard set of "perspectives" ("Financial", "Customer", "Internal Business Processes", "Learning & Growth").

Design of a Balanced Scorecard became a process of selecting a small number of objectives in each perspective, and then choosing measures and targets to inform on progress against this objective. But very quickly it was realized that the perspective headings chosen only worked for specific organisations (small to medium-sized firms in North America - the target market of the Harvard Business Review), and during the mid to late 1990s papers began to be published arguing that other sets of headings would make more sense for specific organization types, and that some organisations would benefit from using more or less than four headings.

Despite these concerns, the 'standard' set of perspectives remains the most common, and traditionally is arrayed on the strategy map in the sequence (from bottom to top) "Learning & Growth", "Internal Business Processes", "Customer", "Financial" with causal arrows tending to flow "up" the page.

The 'standard' set of perspectives is arranged in the sequence (bottom to top) to allow a sequential linkage from the investment perspective of Learning and Growth to the outcome perspectives of Customer and Financial. A well-designed strategy map will allow the author to 'tell a story' from the bottom to the top along the lines of "If we invest in (training, education etc) it will allow us to improve our Internal Processes which will impact our Customers (in a positive way) and improve our Financial results. In other words, Learning and Growth drive Internal Process change which impacts Customer Satisfaction which in turn improves Profitability. In the early part of the century, it was recognized that the perspective Learning and Growth was lacking significant investment areas, that of infrastructure and IT. Today, the lower-most perspective has been renamed to Organisational Capacity.

== Links between the strategy map and strategy development ==
The strategy map is a device that promotes three stages of conversation during the strategy development, implementation and learning process

- First to capture a strategy from a management team. To promote discussion amongst that team on the strategy, so they all leave the room telling the same story of their strategy.
- Secondly to communicate the strategy, focus organization efforts, and choose appropriate measures to report on an organisation's progress in implementing a strategy.
- Finally to provide a basis to review and potentially revise the strategy — not simply the measures or targets — and to support conversations and decision making, as the team learns from the strategy's implementation.

Over the years many have suggested that it can be used as, in part, a strategy development tool. Kaplan & Norton in their book The Strategy Focused Organisation argue that organisations could adopt 'industry standard' templates (basically a set of pre-determined strategic objectives).

== See also ==
- Third-generation balanced scorecard
