= Kenichi Ohmae =

Japanese academic

Kenichi Ohmae 大前 研一
- Born: February 21, 1943 (age 83); Kitakyūshū, Fukuoka Prefecture, Japan
- Education: Waseda University; Tokyo Institute of Technology; Massachusetts Institute of Technology

Kenichi Ohmae (大前 研一, Ōmae Ken'ichi; born February 22, 1943) is a Japanese organizational theorist, management consultant, former Professor and Dean of UCLA Luskin School of Public Affairs, and author, known for developing the 3Cs model. He has argued that Japan's prolonged economic stagnation stems from a societal shift he terms a "low-desire society", characterized by declining ambition and consumption, particularly among younger generations.

== Biography ==
Born in 1943 in Kitakyūshū, Ohmae earned a BS in chemistry in 1966 from Waseda University, an MS in nuclear physics in 1968 from the Tokyo Institute of Technology, and a doctorate in nuclear engineering from the Massachusetts Institute of Technology in 1970.

After graduation, Ohmae subsequently worked as a senior design engineer for Hitachi from 1970 to 1972. From 1972 to 1995 he worked for McKinsey & Company. As a senior partner he ran the company's Japan operations for a number of years. He co-founded its strategic management practice, and served companies in a wide spectrum of industries, including industrial and consumer electronics, finance, telecommunications, food and chemicals. In 1995 he ran for Governor of Tokyo, but lost to Yukio Aoshima.

In 1997 he went to the United States, where he was appointed Dean and Professor of UCLA Luskin School of Public Affairs. In 1997 to 1998, he became a Guest professor of Stanford Graduate School of Business, MBA Program.

In 2011, he became a Project director for Team "H2O", and coordinated in preparing the report "What should we learn from the severe accident at the Fukushima Dai-ichi Nuclear Power Plant?" and submitted it to Goshi Hosono, the Minister of Environment & Minister for the Restoration of Nuclear Accident. In 2012, he became a member of The "Nuclear Reform Monitoring Committee" of Tokyo Electric Power Company (TEPCO).

== Work ==
Ohmae introduced Japanese management methods to a broad Western audience, specifically the Toyota practice of just-in-time production. He also outlined the differences between Japanese and Western companies, in particular:

- the long strategic planning horizon of Japanese companies
- the short planning horizon based on shareholder value thinking of Western companies

Through his numerous publications, he coined many terms that are still in use today. In the 1980s, he predicted and described globalization as a prominent phenomenon in the world economy.

== Publications ==
Ohmae has written a number of books, including

- The Mind of the Strategist
- The End of the Nation State
- The Borderless World
- Triad Power
- Low-Desire Society: A New Wealth of Nations in an Era Without Grand Ambition (Japanese: 低欲望社会 「大志なき時代」の新・国富論), Shogakukan, 2015, ISBN 978-4-09-379871-6
