= The Adversary =

The Adversary may refer to:

- "The Adversary" (Star Trek: Deep Space Nine), a 1995 episode of Star Trek: Deep Space Nine
- The Adversary (Ihsahn album), the debut solo album of Emperor frontman Ihsahn
- The Adversary (Thy Art Is Murder album), the debut album by deathcore band Thy Art Is Murder
- The Adversary (Fables)
- The Adversary (Carrère book), a French non-fiction book on the murders perpetuated by Jean-Claude Romand written by Emmanuel Carrère
- The Adversary (film), a 2002 French drama film directed by Nicole Garcia based on Emmanuel Carrère's book of the same name
- Pratidwandi, known internationally as The Adversary, a 1970 Indian Bengali film directed by Satyajit Ray
- The Adversary, book four in "The Saga of the Exiles" by Julian May
- The Adversary, one of the English translation of the Hebrew word "Satan", an evil figure appearing in the texts of the Abrahamic religions
- The Adversary (Westworld), an episode of the HBO series Westworld

== See also ==
- Adversary (disambiguation)
