= IT performance management =

In a business or IT Management context, IT performance management is concerned with measuring the expenditure of capital and human resources on Information Technology projects. This allows the business to determine how these expenditures improve strategic and operational capabilities of the firm in designing and developing products and services for maximum customer satisfaction, corporate productivity, profitability, and competitiveness. This type of IT Performance Management is usually of interest to executive level IT personnel, all the way up to the Chief Information Officer (CIO), and is related to IT Portfolio Management.

== Benefits ==
=== Direct financial gains ===
- Focuses IT resources on projects that grow sales
- Focuses IT resources on projects that reduce costs
- Aligns IT organization directly behind corporate financial goals

=== Improved management control ===
- Demonstrates the direct business value of each IT project or operation
- Helps audit and comply with legislative requirements
- Allows reallocation of IT resources to projects of most importance to the corporation
- Facilitates the elimination of IT projects that are not delivering on expected benefits

== See also ==
- IT Resource Performance Management
