= Strategic assumption surfacing and testing =

Strategic assumptions surfacing and testing (SAST) is a method for approaching ill-structured problems. It can be applied as a dialectical approach to policy and planning.

An ill-structured problem may alternatively be also labelled as a wicked problem. SAST may be applied as a technique of systems thinking.

An ill-structured problem is "one for which various strategies for providing a possible solution rest on assumptions that are in sharp conflict with one another". The purposes for an SAST method are:

- to help surface for explicit examination the underlying assumptions that analysts often unconsciously bring with them to a problem situation;
- to compare and to evaluate systematically the assumptions of different analysts;
- to examine the relationship between underlying assumptions and the resulting policies which are derived and dependent upon them; and
- to attempt to formulate new, novel, and originally unforeseen policies based on previously unforeseen assumptions.

Four stages in the method include:

1. Assumption specification
2. Dialectic phase
3. Assumption integration phase
4. Composite strategy creation

The method originated through the collaboration between Richard O. Mason and Ian Mitroff, as an extension of the philosophy on the design of inquiring systems originating from C. West Churchman. SAST follows the prescriptions of dialectic inquiry, sweeping in multiple perspective onto the full breadth of underlying assumptions to collaborative problem solving and strategic design.
