= Strategy visualization =

Strategy visualization is any kind of (semi-artistic) infographics for visualization of a business strategy.

== See also ==
- Visual analytics
