= James Brian Quinn =

American academic

- Born: March 18, 1928; Memphis, Tennessee
- Died: August 28, 2012 (aged 84)
- Occupations: Professor, author
- Awards: McKinsey Award

Academic background
- Education: Yale University, Harvard, Columbia University

Academic work
- Discipline: Management Studies
- Institutions: William and Josephine Buchanan Professor of Management Emeritus at Tuck School of Business

James Brian Quinn (1928 – 28 August 2012) was an American academic and author. Quinn was a longtime professor at the Tuck School of Business and a proponent of knowledge management. He formulated the managerial concept of intelligent enterprise in 1992.

== Biography ==
Quinn was born in Memphis, Tennessee in 1928. He attended Yale University, where he obtained a Bachelor of Science degree in engineering in 1949. Quinn then obtained a master's degree in business administration from Harvard and a doctorate in philosophy from Columbia University.

In 1957, Quinn became a professor at the Tuck School of Business Administration, where he worked until his retirement in 1993. In the intervening years, Quinn created Tuck's curriculum for business policy and technology policy courses. He also formulated and taught several classes related to entrepreneurship; in doing so, Quinn became a progenitor for such type of class in American universities. He also served as Tuck's William and Josephine Buchanan Professor of Management Emeritus.

Quinn worked with the United States Commerce Department during the Chinese reform and opening up period in 1979, and later on served as a chair on the Clinton Administration's Academic Committee for Policy Review on Innovation and Productivity.

He was a three-time recipient of the McKinsey Award.

Quinn died on 28 August 2012 at the age of 84.

== Works ==
- In his 1992 work Intelligent Enterprise, Quinn formulated the concept of intelligent enterprise, an approach to management that applies technology and service paradigms to the challenge of improving business performance.
- Quinn worked with Henry Mintzberg on The Strategy Process (1996).
