= Strategic planning =

Organizational decision making process

Strategic planning or corporate planning is an activity undertaken by an organization through which it seeks to define its future direction and makes decisions such as resource allocation aimed at achieving its intended goals. "Strategy" has many definitions, but it generally involves setting major goals, determining actions to achieve these goals, setting a timeline, and mobilizing resources to execute the actions. A strategy describes how the ends (goals) will be achieved by the means (resources) in a given span of time. Often, strategic planning is long term and organizational action steps are established from two to five years in the future. Strategy can be planned ("intended") or can be observed as a pattern of activity ("emergent") as the organization adapts to its environment or competes in the market.

The senior leadership of an organization is generally tasked with determining strategy. It is executed by strategic planners or strategists, who involve many parties and research sources in their analysis of the organization and its relationship to the environment in which it competes.

Strategy includes processes of formulation and implementation; strategic planning helps coordinate both. However, strategic planning is analytical in nature (i.e., it involves "finding the dots"); strategy formation itself involves synthesis (i.e., "connecting the dots") via strategic thinking. As such, strategic planning occurs around the strategy formation activity.

== History ==
Strategic planning became prominent in corporations during the 1960s and remains an important aspect of strategic management.

McKinsey & Company developed a capability maturity model in the 1970s to describe the sophistication of planning processes, with strategic management ranked the highest. The four stages include:

1. Financial planning, which is primarily about annual budgets and a functional focus, with limited regard for the environment;
2. Forecast-based planning, which includes multi-year financial plans and more robust capital allocation across business units;
3. Externally oriented planning, where a thorough situation analysis and competitive assessment is performed;
4. Strategic management, where widespread strategic thinking occurs and a well-defined strategic framework is used.

Stages 3 and 4 are strategic planning, while the first two stages are non-strategic, essentially financially-based. Each stage builds on the previous stages; that is, a stage 4 organization completes activities in all four categories.

In 1993, President Bill Clinton signed into law the Government Performance and Results Act, which required US federal agencies to develop strategic plans for how they would deliver high quality products and services to the American people.

In the business sector, McKinsey research undertaken and published in 2006 found that, although many companies had a formal strategic-planning process, the process was not being used for their "most important decisions".

For Michael C. Sekora, Project Socrates founder in the Reagan White House, during the Cold War the economically challenged Soviet Union was able to keep on western military capabilities by using technology-based planning while the U.S. was slowed by finance-based planning, until the Reagan administration launched the Socrates Project, which should be revived to keep up with China as an emerging superpower.

== Process ==
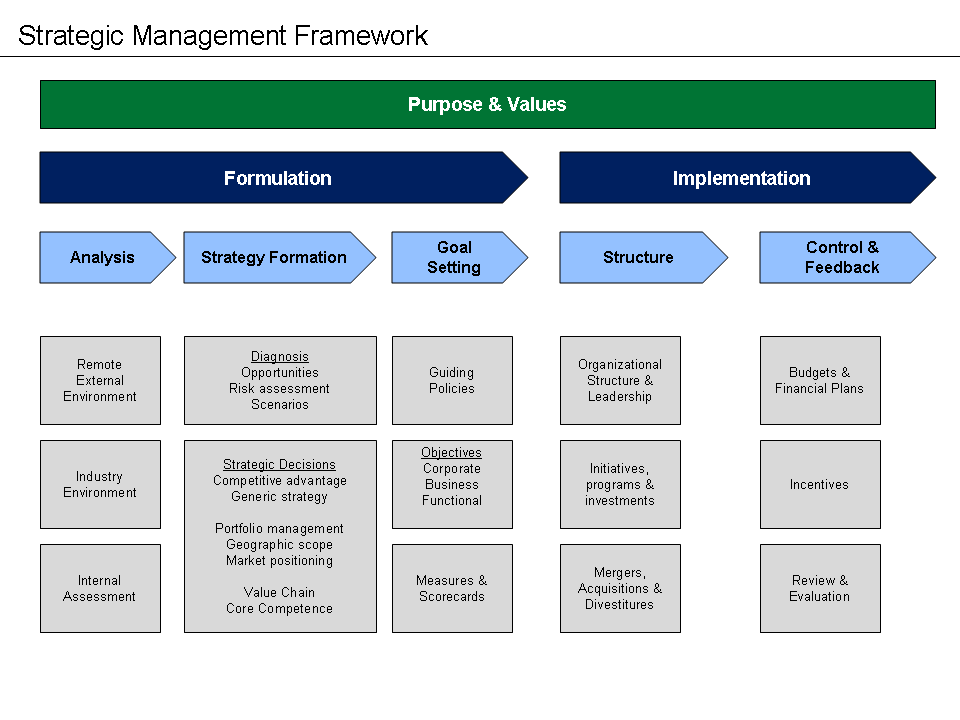
Strategic management processes and activities

=== Overview ===
Strategic planning is a process and thus has inputs, activities, outputs, and outcomes. This process, like all processes, has constraints. It may be formal or informal and is typically iterative, with feedback loops throughout the process. Some elements of the process may be continuous, and others may be executed as discrete projects with a definitive start and end during a period. Strategic planning provides inputs for strategic thinking; these are best seen as distinct but complementary activities. Strategic thinking guides the actual strategy formation. Typical strategic planning efforts include the evaluation of the organization's mission and strategic issues to strengthen current practices and determine the need for new programming. The end result is the organization's strategy, including a diagnosis of the environment and competitive situation, a guiding policy on what the organization intends to accomplish, and key initiatives or action plans for achieving the guiding policy.

Michael Porter wrote in 1980 that formulation of competitive strategy includes consideration of four key elements:

1. Company strengths and weaknesses;
2. Personal values of the key implementers (i.e., management and the board);
3. Industry opportunities and threats;
4. Broader societal expectations.

The first two elements relate to factors internal to the company (i.e., the internal environment), while the latter two relate to factors external to the company (i.e., the external environment). These elements are considered throughout the strategic planning process.

=== Inputs ===
Data is gathered from various sources, such as interviews with key executives, review of publicly available documents on the competition or market, primary research (e.g., visiting or observing competitor places of business or comparing prices), industry studies, reports of the organization's performance, etc. This may be part of a competitive intelligence program. Inputs are gathered to help establish a baseline, support an understanding of the competitive environment and its opportunities and risks. Other inputs include an understanding of the values of key stakeholders, such as the board, shareholders, and senior management. These values may be captured in an organization's vision and mission statements.

=== Activities ===
The essence of formulating competitive strategy is relating a company to its environment.

— Michael Porter

Strategic planning activities include meetings and other communication among the organization's leaders and personnel to develop a common understanding regarding the competitive environment and what the organization's response to that environment should be. A variety of strategic planning tools may be completed as part of strategic planning activities.

The organization's leaders may have a series of questions they want to be answered in formulating the strategy and gathering inputs.

=== Outputs ===
The output of strategic planning includes documentation and communication describing the organization's strategy and how it should be implemented, sometimes referred to as the strategic plan. The strategy may include a diagnosis of the competitive situation, a guiding policy for achieving the organization's goals, and specific action plans to be implemented. A strategic plan may cover multiple years and be updated periodically.

The organization may use a variety of methods to measure and monitor progress towards the strategic objectives and measures established, such as a balanced scorecard or a strategy map. Organizations may also plan their financial statements (i.e., balance sheets, income statements, and cash flows) for several years when developing their strategic plan, as part of the goal-setting activity. The term operational budget is often used to describe the expected financial performance of an organization for the upcoming year. Capital budgets very often form the backbone of a strategic plan, especially as it increasingly relates to Information and Communications Technology (ICT).

=== Outcomes ===
While the planning process produces outputs, strategy implementation or execution of the strategic plan produces outcomes. These outcomes will invariably differ from the strategic goals. How close they are to the strategic goals and vision will determine the success or failure of the strategic plan. Unintended outcomes might also be an issue. They need to be attended to and understood for strategy development and execution to be a true learning process.

== Tools and approaches ==
2011 video explaining the strategic plan of the Wikimedia Foundation

Wikimedia Movement Strategic Plan (PDF)

=== Analytical tools ===
A variety of analytical tools and techniques are used in strategic planning. These were developed by companies and management consulting firms to help provide a framework for strategic planning. Such tools include:

- PEST analysis, which covers the remote external environment elements such as political, economic, social and technological (PESTLE adds legal/regulatory and ecological/environmental);
- Scenario planning, which was originally used in the military and recently used by large corporations to analyze future scenarios.
- Porter five forces analysis, which addresses industry attractiveness and rivalry through the bargaining power of buyers and suppliers and the threat of substitute products and new market entrants;
- SWOT analysis, which addresses internal strengths and weaknesses relative to the external opportunities and threats;
- Growth-share matrix, which involves portfolio decisions about which businesses to retain or divest; and
- Balanced scorecards and strategy maps, which creates a systematic framework for measuring and controlling strategy.
- Responsive evaluation, which uses a constructivist evaluation approach to identify the outcomes of objectives, which then supports future strategic planning exercises.
- VRIO Framework, which determines the competitive advantage of a product or a service through evaluating four elements such as value, rarity, imitability and organization.

=== Specific contexts ===
Strategic planning can be used in project management with a focus on the development of a standard repeatable methodology adding to the likelihood of achieving project objectives. This requires a lot of thinking process and interaction among stakeholders. Strategic planning in Project Management provides an organization the framework and consistency of action. In addition, it ensures communication of overall goals and understanding roles of teams or individual to achieve them. The commitment of top management must be evident throughout the process to reduce resistance to change, ensure acceptance, and avoid common pitfalls. Strategic planning does not guarantee success but will help improve likelihood of success of an organization.

The application of strategic planning is also a significant focus within educational institutions, which use it as a tool to navigate complex environments and enhance institutional performance. A 2025 systematic literature review by Endo et al. found that well-defined strategic plans are linked to higher academic performance, improved resource allocation, and greater stakeholder engagement. Despite its recognized benefits, the review notes that implementation often faces significant challenges, including "limited resources, resistance to change, and the complexity of aligning diverse stakeholder interests." The success of strategic planning in education is therefore highly dependent on factors such as effective leadership, robust stakeholder engagement, and the use of analytical tools to ensure that strategic plans are both realistic and impactful.

== Strategic planning vs. financial planning ==
Simply extending financial statement projections into the future without consideration of the competitive environment is a form of financial planning or budgeting, not strategic planning. In business, the term "financial plan" is often used to describe the expected financial performance of an organization for future periods. The term "budget" is used for a financial plan for the upcoming year. A "forecast" is typically a combination of actual performance year-to-date plus expected performance for the remainder of the year, so is generally compared against plan or budget and prior performance. The financial plans accompanying a strategic plan may include three–five years of projected performance.

== Criticism ==
=== Strategic planning vs. strategic thinking ===
Strategic planning has been criticized for attempting to systematize strategic thinking and strategy formation, which Henry Mintzberg argues are inherently creative activities involving synthesis or "connecting the dots" which cannot be systematized. Mintzberg argues that strategic planning can help coordinate planning efforts and measure progress on strategic goals, but that it occurs "around" the strategy formation process rather than within it. It functions remote from the "front lines" or contact with the competitive environment (i.e., in business, facing the customer where the effect of competition is most clearly evident) may not be effective at supporting strategy efforts.

=== Evidence on strategic planning's impact ===
While much criticism surrounds strategic planning, evidence suggests that it does work. In a 2019 meta-analysis including data from almost 9,000 public and private organizations, strategic planning is found to have a positive impact on organizational performance. Strategic planning is particularly potent in enhancing an organization's capacity to achieve its goals (i.e., effectiveness). However, the study argues that just having a plan is not enough. For strategic planning to work, it needs to include some formality (i.e., including an analysis of the internal and external environment and the stipulation of strategies, goals and plans based on these analyses), comprehensiveness (i.e., producing many strategic options before selecting the course to follow) and careful stakeholder management (i.e., thinking carefully about whom to involve during the different steps of the strategic planning process, how, when and why).

=== Strategic plans as tools to communicate and control ===
Henry Mintzberg in the article "The Fall and Rise of Strategic Planning" (1994), argued that the lesson that should be accepted is that managers will never be able to take charge of strategic planning through a formalized process. Therefore, he underscored the role of plans as tools to communicate and control. It ensures that there is coordination wherein everyone in the organization is moving in the same direction. The plans are the prime media communicating the management's strategic intentions, thereby promoting a common direction instead of individual discretion. It is also the tool to secure the support of the organization's external sphere, such as financiers, suppliers or government agencies, who are helping achieve the organization's plans and goals.

== The strategic plan genre of communication ==
Cornut et al (2012) studied the particular features of the strategic plan genre of communication by examining a corpus of strategic plans from public and non-profit organizations. They defined strategic plans as the "key material manifestation" of organizations' strategies and argued that, even though strategic plans are specific to an organization, there is a generic quality that draws on shared institutional understanding on the substance, form and communicative purposes of the strategic plan. Hence, they posit that strategic plan is a genre of organizational communication (Bhatia, 2004; Yates and Orlikowski, 1992 as cited in Cornut et al., 2012). In this sense, genre is defined as the "conventionalized discursive actions in which participating individuals or institutions have shared perceptions of communicative purposes as well as those of constraints operating their construction, interpretation and conditions of use" (Bhatia, 2004: 87; see also Frow, 2005; Swales, 1990 as cited in Cornut et al., 2012).

The authors compared the corpus of strategic plans with nine other corpora. This included annual reports from the public sector and non-government organizations, research articles, project plans, executive speeches, State of the Union addresses, horoscopes, religious sermons, business magazine articles, and annual reports of for-profit corporations included in the Standard & Poor’s 500 largest companies (S&P 500).

The authors used textual analysis, including content analysis and corpus linguistics. Content analysis was used to identify themes and concepts, such as values and cognition; while corpus linguistics was used to identify naturally occurring texts and patterns (Biber et al., 1998 as cited in Cornut et al., 2012).

=== Taking a stance ===
The strategic plans showed significantly less self-reference than all other corpora, with the exception of project plans and S&P 500 annual reports. The results indicated that strategic plans contain more moderate verbs of deontic value. This was interpreted as an indication that “commands and commitments are not overtly hedged, but neither are they particularly strong.”

Guidance on the sections of a strategic plan abound but there are few studies about the nature of language used for these documents. Cornut et al.'s (2012) study showed that writers of strategic plans have a shared understanding of what is the appropriate language. Thus, the authors argued, a true strategist is one who is able to instantiate the genre strategic plan through appropriate application of language.

=== Strategic planning as communicative process ===
Spee et al.. (2011) explored the strategic planning as communicative process based on Ricoeur's concepts of decontextualization and recontextualization, they conceptualize strategic planning activities as being constituted through the iterative and recursive relationship of talk and text, this elaborate the construction of a strategic plan as a communicative process. This study looks at the way that texts within the planning process, such as PowerPoint presentations, planning documents and targets that are part of a strategic plan, are constructed in preparation, through a series of communicative interface. Throughout the process, strategy documents were essential in detaining the developing strategy as they were constantly revised up until an ultimate plan was accepted.

A book edited by Mandeville-Gamble (2015) sees the roles of managers as important in terms of communicating the strategic vision of the organization. Many of the authors in the book by Mandeville-Gamble agree that a strategic plan is merely an unrealized vision unless it is widely shared and sparks the willingness to change within individuals in the organization. Similarly, Goodman in 2017 emphasized that the advent of the internet and social media has become one of the most important vehicle to which corporate strategic plan can be distributed to an organizations internal and external stakeholders. This distribution of knowledge allows for staff of organization to access and share the institutional thinking this able to reformulate it in their own words.

=== Strategic planning through control mechanisms ===
Strategic planning through control mechanisms (mostly by the way of a communication program) is set in the hopes of coming to desired outcomes that reflect company or organizational goals. As further supplement to this idea, controls can also be realized in both measurable and intangible controls, specifically output controls, behavioural controls, and clan controls. By way of simple definition, output controls work toward to tangible and quantifiable results; behavioural controls are geared toward behaviours of people in an organization; and clan controls are dependent and are executed while keeping in mind norms, traditions, and organizational culture. All these three are implemented in order to keep systems and strategies running and focused toward desired results (n.d.).

=== Strategic planning, learning organizations, and communication ===
Strategic planning is both the impetus for and result of critical thinking, optimization, and motivation for the growth and development of organizations. The core disciplines, which are inherent in systems thinking, personal and organizational mastery, mental models, building a shared vision, and team learning. In a time of machine learning and data analytics, these core disciplines remain to be relevant in so far as having human resource and human interest become the driving force behind organizations.

Moreover, it cannot be denied that communication plays a role in the realization of learning organizations and strategic planning. In a study by Barker and Camarata (1998), the authors noted that there are theories that could explain the invaluable role of communication, and these are from Rational Choice Theory to Social Exchange Theory where costs, rewards, and outcomes are valued in maintaining communication and thus relationships to serve the ends of an organization and its members. Thus, while many organizations and companies try their best to become learning organizations and exercise strategic planning, without communication, relationships fail and the core disciplines are never truly met (Barker & Camarata, 1998).

== See also ==
- Business strategy mapping
- Chief strategy officer
- Decision making software
- Enterprise planning systems
- Francis J. Aguilar
- Growth planning
- Hoshin Kanri
- Integrated business planning
- Marketing strategy
- Military strategy
  - The Art of War – ancient book on military strategy
- Operational planning
- Situation analysis
- Strategic assumptions
- Strategic planning software
- Strategy Markup Language (StratML)
- U.S. Army Strategist
