= David P. Norton =

American businessman

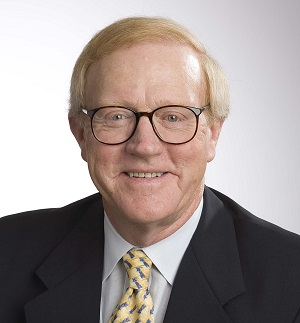
- Born: 1941; U.S.
- Died: December 6, 2023 (aged 81–82)
- Education: Electrical Engineering degree from Worcester Polytechnic Institute in 1962. Advanced degrees include a master's in Operations Research from Florida Institute of Technology, an MBA in Business from Florida State University, and a Doctorate in Business from Harvard Business School.
- Alma mater: Worcester Polytechnic Institute; Florida Institute of Technology; Florida State University; Harvard Business School
- Known for: Co-creation of the Balanced Scorecard framework for strategy management.

David P. Norton (1941–2023) was an American business theorist, business executive and management consultant, known as co-creator, together with Robert S. Kaplan, of the Balanced Scorecard. David P. Norton co-founded Palladium Group, Inc. (previously Balanced Scorecard Collaborative) and served as its chief executive officer.

== Biography ==
Norton obtained his BS in Electrical Engineering in the early 1960s from Worcester Polytechnic Institute, then continued his studies at the Florida Institute of Technology where he obtained his MS in Operations Research and his MBA from the Florida State University. For his graduate studies he moved to the Harvard University, where he obtained his Doctor of Business Administration.

Norton started his career in industry. With Richard L. Nolan, he co-founded the consulting firm Nolan, Norton & Co in 1975, and served as its president. When the firm was acquired by KPMG Peat Marwick in 1987, Nolan became Partner in the firm until 1992. In 1992 Norton became founding President of Renaissance Solutions, Inc., and became its chief executive officer in 1993. He also co-founded, with Robert S. Kaplan, ESM Software Group, rebranded as the Palladium Group, with the Balanced Scorecard Collaborative (BSCol) as a subsidiary, and was its chief executive officer until 2007. As of 2015, the Palladium Group was acquired by GRM International (with the combined business rebranded Palladium International). Norton (and Kaplan) remained affiliated with Palladium.

Norton and Robert S. Kaplan created the Balanced Scorecard, a means of linking a company's current actions to its long-term goals. Kaplan and Norton introduced the Balanced Scorecard method in their 1992 Harvard Business Review article, The Balanced Scorecard: Measures That Drive Performance.

== Selected publications ==
- Kaplan, Robert S., and David P. Norton, Strategy maps: Converting intangible assets into tangible outcomes. Harvard Business Press, 2004.
- Kaplan, Robert S., and David P. Norton, The strategy-focused organization: How balanced scorecard companies thrive in the new business environment. Harvard Business Press, 2001.

=== Articles ===
- Kaplan, Robert S., and David P. Norton, "The Balanced Scorecard: Measures That Drive Performance," Harvard Business Review, Jan.–Feb. 1992.
- Kaplan, Robert S., and David P. Norton, "The balanced scorecard: translating strategy into action." Harvard Business Press, 1996.
- Kaplan, Robert S., and David P. Norton, "Using the balanced scorecard as a strategic management system." Harvard Business Review 74.1 (1996): 75-85.
