= Situation analysis =

Methods used to analyze an organization's environment

In strategic management, situation analysis refers to a collection of methods that managers use to analyze an organization's internal and external environment to understand the organization's capabilities, customers, and business environment. The situation analysis can include several methods of analysis such as the 5C analysis, SWOT analysis and Porter's five forces analysis.

== In marketing ==
In marketing, a marketing plan is created to guide businesses on how to communicate the benefits of their products to the needs of potential customer. The situation analysis is the second step in the marketing plan and is a critical step in establishing a long term relationship with customers.

The parts of a marketing plan are:

- Introduction
- Situation analysis
- Objectives
- Budgeting
- Strategy
- Execution
- Evaluation

The situation analysis looks at both the macro-environmental factors that affect many firms within the environment and the micro-environmental factors that specifically affect the firm. The purpose of the situation analysis is to indicate to a company about the organizational and product position, as well as the overall survival of the business, within the environment. Companies must be able to summarize opportunities and problems within the environment so they can understand their capabilities within the market.

== 5C analysis ==
While a situation analysis is often referred to as the "3C analysis", the extension to the 5C analysis has allowed businesses to gain more information on internal and external factors to aid in strategic decision-making. The 5C analysis is considered the most useful and common way to analyze the market environment, because of the extensive information it provides.

=== Company ===
The company analysis involves evaluation of the company's objectives, strategy, and capabilities. These indicate to an organization the strength of the business model, whether there are areas for improvement, and how well an organization fits the external environment.

- Goals and objectives: An analysis on the mission of the business, the industry of the business and the stated goals required to achieve the mission.
- Position: An analysis on the marketing strategy and the marketing mix.
- Performance: An analysis on how effective the business is achieving their stated mission and goals.
- Product line: An analysis on the products manufactured by the business and how successful it is in the market.

=== Competitors ===
The competitor analysis takes into consideration the competitors position within the industry and the potential threat it may pose to other businesses. The main purpose of the competitor analysis is for businesses to analyze a competitor's current and potential nature and capabilities so they can prepare against competition. The competitor analysis looks at the following criteria:

- Identify competitors: Businesses must be able to identify competitors within their industry. Identifying whether competitors provide the same services or products to the same customer base is useful in gaining knowledge of direct competitors. Both direct and indirect competitors must be identified, as well as potential future competitors.
- Assessment of competitors: The competitor analysis looks at competitor goals, mission, strategies and resources. This supports a thorough comparison of goals and strategies of competitors and the organization.
- Predict future initiatives of competitors: An early insight into the potential activity of a competitor helps a company prepare against competition.

=== Customers ===
Customer analysis can be vast and complicated. Some of the important areas that a company analyzes includes:

- Demographics
  - Advertising that is most suitable for the demographic
  - Market size and potential growth
  - Customer wants and needs
  - Motivation to buy the product
  - Distribution channels (retail, online, wholesale, etc...)
  - Quantity and frequency of purchase
  - Income level of customer

=== Collaborators ===
Collaborators are useful for businesses as they allow for an increase in the creation of ideas, as well as an increase in the likelihood of gaining more business opportunities. The following type of collaborators are:

- Agencies: Agencies are the middlemen of the business world. When businesses need a specific worker who specializes in the trade, they go to a recruitment agency.
- Suppliers: Suppliers provide raw materials that are required to build products. Different types of Suppliers include manufacturers, wholesalers, merchants, franchisors, importers and exporters, independent crafts people and drop shippers. Each category of suppliers can bring a different skill and experience to the company.
- Distributors: Distributors are important as they are the holding areas for inventory. Distributors can help manage manufacturer relationships as well as handle vendor relationships.
- Partnerships: Business partners would share assets and liabilities, allowing for a new source of capital and skills.

Businesses must be able to identify whether the collaborator has the capabilities needed to help run the business as well as an analysis on the level of commitment needed for a collaborator-business relationship.

=== Climate ===
To fully understand the business climate and environment, many factors that can affect the business must be researched and understood. An analysis on the climate is also known as PEST analysis. The types of climate/environment firms have to analyse are:

- Political and regulatory environment: An analysis of how actively the government regulates the market with their policies and how it would affect the production, distribution and sale of the goods and services.
- Economic Environment: An analysis of trends regarding macroeconomics, such as exchange rates and inflation rate, can prove to influence businesses.
- Social/cultural environment: An analysis interpreting the trends of society, which includes the study of demographics, education, culture etc.
- Technological analysis: An analysis of technology helps improve on old routines and suggest new methods for being cost efficient. To stay competitive and gain an advantage over competitors, businesses must sufficiently understand technological advances.

== SWOT ==
A SWOT analysis is another method of situation analysis that examines the strengths and weaknesses of a company (internal environment) as well as the opportunities and threats within the market (external environment). A SWOT analysis looks at both current and future situations. The goal is to build on strengths as much as possible while reducing weaknesses. This analysis helps a company come up with a plan that keeps it prepared for a number of potential scenarios, as part of corporate planning or strategic planning

== Porter's five forces industry analysis ==
Porter's model involves scanning the environment for threats from competitors and identifying problems early on to minimize threats imposed by competitors. This model can apply for any type of business, from small to larger sized businesses. Porter's model is not just for businesses, but can also be applied to a country to help gain insight into creating a competitive advantage in the global market. The ultimate purpose of Porter's five forces model is to help businesses compare and analyze their profitability and position with the industry against indirect and direct competition.
