= Chris Bart =

Canadian academic

- Education: York University; Ivey School of Business
- Occupations: Educator; Management consultant Author
- Website: corporatemissionsinc.com

Chris Bart is a Canadian business consultant, author and former university professor.

== Early life and education ==
Bart was born in Canada. He holds a B.A. (Hons.Bus.) and an MBA from the Schulich School of Business at York University. He is also a chartered accountant certified by the Institute of Chartered Accountants of Ontario and has received a Ph.D. from the Ivey School of Business at the University of Western Ontario.

== Career ==
Bart joined McMaster University in 1981. He served as a Professor of Strategy and Governance at DeGroote School of Business until 2013 after he and 5 other professors were suspended for harassing other faculty in an effort to deny their faculty's Dean a second term.

Bart, a co-founder, is currently Executive Chairman of the Caribbean Governance Training Institute and the Caribbean Institute of Directors.

== Author ==
Bart has published more than 190 articles, cases and reviews. He is the author of A Tale of Two Employees and the Person Who Wanted to Lead Them.

== Bibliography ==
Books

- A Tale of Two Employees. Corporate Missions Inc. Press, 2002. ISBN 0-9732247-0-3.
- A Tale of Two Employees and the Person Who Wanted to Lead Them
- The Mission Driven Hospital: Turning Noble Aspirations into Accountability and Action
- Achieving the Execution Edge: 20 Essential Questions Corporate Directors Need to get Answered About Strategy Execution
- A Tale of Two Husbands and the Woman Who Wanted to Love Them
- A Tale of Two School Principals and the Superintendent Who Wanted to Lead Them
- A Tale of Two Team Members and the Insurance Agent Who Wanted to Lead Them

Monographs

- Twenty Questions for Directors Should Ask about Strategy. Canadian Institute of Chartered Accountants, 2003, ISBN 1-55385-031-9.
- Twenty Questions Directors Should Ask about Strategy – Second Edition. Canadian Institute of Chartered Accountants, 2006. ISBN 1-55385-031-9.
- Twenty Essential Questions Directors of Not-for-profit Organizations Should Ask about Strategy. Corporate Missions Inc. Press, 2009. ISBN 978-0-9732247-3-3.

== Selected publications ==
- "IT and the board of directors: An empirical investigation into the 'Governance questions' directors should ask about IT, JIS, 224, 2, Fall 2010, 147–172.
- An exploration into the content of the compensation discussion & analysis document", Corporate Board, 5, 2, 2009, 6–15
- The role of the board in IT governance: Current and desired oversight practices." International Journal of Business Governance and Ethics, 4, 4, 2009, 316–329.
- Leveraging human intellectual capital through an employee volunteer program and service-learning: The case of Ford Motor Company of Canada." Journal of Intellectual Capital, 10, 1, 2009, 121–134.
- Improving the board's involvement in corporate strategy: Directors speak out", International Journal of Business Governance and Ethics, V 3, no. 4, 2007, pp. 382–393.
- A comparative analysis of mission statement content in secular and faith based hospitals", Journal of Intellectual Capital, Vol 8, No. 4, 2007, 682–694
- Issues in Canadian board transparency", Corporate Board, Vol 3, No 1, 2007, pp. 43–48.
- The performance impact of content and process in product innovation charters", Journal of Product Innovation Management, V24, No. 1, 2007, pp. 3–19.

== Awards and recognition ==
- 2011: TD Insurance Meloche Monnex Corporate Governance and Strategic Leadership Award.
- 2012: Queen Elizabeth II Diamond Jubilee Medal on nomination from MP David Sweet.
- Ontario Chamber of Commerce Award for Corporate Governance
- Hamilton Chamber of Commerce Award
- McMaster's Innovation Award
- McMaster's Research Recognition Award
- McMaster's Theory to Practice Award
