= Robert S. Kaplan =

American academic (born 1940)

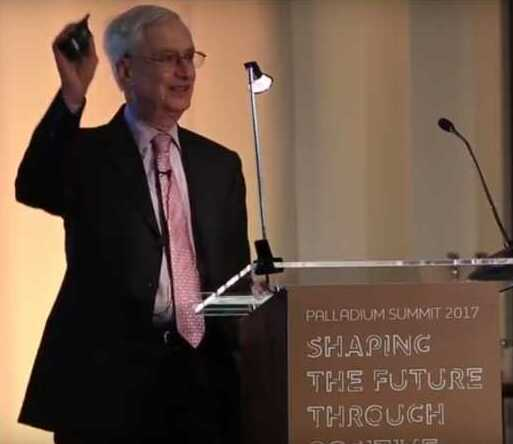
- Kaplan speaking at the 2017 Palladium Positive Impact Summit in London.
- Born: Robert Samuel Kaplan; 2 May 1940 (age 86)
- Occupations: Accounting academic and professor

Academic background
- Education: Massachusetts Institute of Technology (B.S. and M.S.); Cornell University (Ph.D.)

Academic work
- Discipline: Leadership development
- Institutions: Harvard Business School; Carnegie-Mellon University (1977–1983)
- Main interests: Activity-based costing (ABC) and the Balanced Scorecard (BSC)

Robert Samuel Kaplan (born 1940) is an American accounting academic, and Emeritus Professor of Leadership Development at the Harvard Business School. He is known as co-creator of Balanced Scorecard. together with David P. Norton.

== Biography ==
Kaplan started his academic career at Tepper School of Business at Carnegie-Mellon University in 1968. Kaplan did Bachelors in Electrical Engineering and Masters in Electrical Engineering at the Massachusetts Institute of Technology.

Later, Kaplan joined the role of Marvin Bower Professor of Leadership Development at Harvard Business School in 1984 after serving as a Dean at Carnegie-Mellon University from 1977 to 1983.

For PhD in Operations Research, he moved to the Cornell University. He was awarded honorary doctorates by the University of Stuttgart in 1994, the University of Lodz in 2006, and the University of Waterloo in 2008.

In 2006, Kaplan's name was added to the Accounting Hall of Fame. In the same year, he received the Lifetime Contribution Award from the Management Accounting Section of the American Accounting Association.

In 2021 Kaplan was awarded honorary doctorate by the Prague University of Economics and Business.

== Work ==
=== Balanced Scorecard ===
Kaplan and David P. Norton created the Balanced Scorecard, a means of linking a company's current actions to its long-term goals. Kaplan and Norton introduced the balanced scorecard method in their 1992 Harvard Business Review article, The Balanced Scorecard: Measures That Drive Performance.

This method has achieved widespread adoption across various industries globally. Its corporate utilization is documented in the Palladium Balanced Scorecard Hall of Fame for Executing Strategy, as well as Bain & Company's Management Tools and Trends report. He has also published in the fields of strategy, cost accounting and management accounting. He is a co-founder, with David P. Norton, of ESM Software Group, and has been involved in the thought leadership work of Palladium International and its past iterations (i.e., Palladium Group, Balanced Scorecard Collaborative, Renaissance Worldwide).

Time-Driven Activity-Based Costing (TDABC)

Kaplan and Steven Anderson co-developed time-driven activity-based costing, or TDABC, a methodology for companies to fully understand costs and to assist them to get on a simpler and more powerful path to increased profits. Most recently, this methodology is being applied to healthcare, in order to measure health care delivery costs across an entire care continuum, at the medical condition level.

Kaplan is a case writer and has placed highly on The Case Centre’s list of top case authors several times. He ranked 32nd In 2018/19, 12th in 2017/18, 18th in 2016/17 and 12th in 2015/16.

He also featured on the list of The Case Centre's all-time top authors list (covering 40 years) released in 2014.

== Selected publications ==
Books and Textbooks, a selection:

- Kaplan, R. S., Serafeim, George, & Tugendhat, Eduardo (2018, January/February). Inclusive Growth: Profitable Strategies for Tackling Poverty and Inequality. Harvard Business Review.
- Kaplan, Robert S., and David P. Norton. The Execution Premium: Linking Strategy to Operations for Competitive Advantage. Harvard Business Press, 2008.
- Kaplan, Robert S., and Steven R. Anderson. Time-Driven Activity-Based Costing: A Simpler and More Powerful Path to Higher Profits. Harvard Business Press, 2007
- Kaplan, Robert S., and David P. Norton. Alignment: Using the Balanced Scorecard to Create Corporate Synergies. Harvard Business Press, 2006.
- Kaplan, Robert S., and David P. Norton. Strategy Maps: Converting Intangible Assets into Tangible Outcomes. Harvard Business Press, 2004.
- Kaplan, Robert S., and David P. Norton. The Strategy-Focused Organization: How Balanced Scorecard Companies Thrive in the New Business Environment. Harvard Business Press, 2000.
- Cooper, Robin, and Robert S. Kaplan. The design of cost management systems: text and cases. Prentice Hall, 1999.
- Kaplan, Robert S., and David P. Norton. The Balanced Scorecard: Translating Strategy into Action. Harvard Business Press, 1996.

Articles, a selection:

- Kaplan, Robert S., George Serafeim, and Eduardo Tugendhat. "Inclusive Growth: Profitable Strategies for Tackling Poverty and Inequality." Harvard Business Review 96.1 (2018)
- Kaplan, Robert S., and David P. Norton. "Using the Balanced Scorecard as a Strategic Management System." Harvard Business Review 74.1 (1996): 75-85.
- Kaplan, Robert S., and David P. Norton. "The Balanced Scorecard: Translating Strategy into Action." Harvard Business Press, 1996.
- Kaplan, Robert S., and David P. Norton, "The Balanced Scorecard: Measures That Drive Performance," Harvard Business Review, Jan.–Feb. 1992
- Johnson, H. Thomas, and Robert S. Kaplan. "The rise and fall of management accounting." Engineering Management Review, IEEE 15.3 (1987): 36-44.
