= Strategy Markup Language =

XML-based standard vocabulary and schema for the information

Strategy Markup Language (StratML) is an XML-based standard vocabulary and schema for the information commonly contained in strategic and performance plans and reports. StratML Part 1 specifies the elements of strategic plans, including mission, vision, values, goals, objectives, and stakeholders. Part 2 extends Part 1 to include the additional elements required for performance plans and reports, including stakeholder roles and performance indicators.

== Overview ==
Originally adopted as an American national standard (ANSI/AIIM 21:2009) Part 1, Strategic Plans, was published as an international standard (ISO 17469–1) on February 11, 2015, with minor changes from the ANSI version. On November 13, 2015, the ANSI version of Part 1 was replaced with the ISO version (ANSI/AIIM/ISO 17469-1). On January 9, 2017, the ISO changes and several additional enhancements were approved for incorporation into Part 2, Performance Plans and Reports (ANSI/AIIM 22:2017). Internationalization of Part 2 will depend upon sufficient support from other nations in the ISO process.

The vision of the StratML standard is "A worldwide web of intentions, stakeholders, and results". Its more explicit purposes include enabling strategic alignment through literal linkages between performance objectives and the business records supporting them. Although the initial focus has been on the plans and reports that U.S. federal agencies are required to compile and maintain under the Government Performance and Results Act (GPRA), the standard has been specified generically so as to be applicable not only to all organizations, worldwide, but also to individuals who choose to lead mission/goal-directed lives.

Section 10 of the GPRA Modernization Act (GPRAMA) requires U.S. federal agencies to publish their strategic and performance plans and reports in machine-readable format. StratML is such a format.

In February 2022 the Data Foundation transmitted to the President's Management Council (PMC) a letter with the following conclusion: "Applying international standards as intended by Section 10 of GPRA modernization will not only comply with the statute, but will also enable the U.S. performance infrastructure to be a model for countries around the world looking for leadership on how to communicate performance information in the 21st Century."

In 2025 ISO 17469-1 was renewed and thus remains current for another five years.

In the August 2025 release of Circular A-11, the Office of Management and Budget (OMB) encourages agencies to submit their budget requests as performance plans and, as required by section 10 of GPRAMA, directs them to begin publishing their annual performance plans and reports in machine-readable format.

== See also ==
- Benefit corporation
- Collective action
- Collective impact
- Collective intelligence
- Complex contagion
- Goal
- Holacracy
- Machine-Readable Documents
- Mass collaboration
- Mission statement
- Objectives & Key Results (OKR)
- OMB Circular A-11
- Performance indicator
- Performance management
- Role
- Sociocracy
- Stakeholder analysis
- Stakeholder (corporate)
- Stakeholder management
- Stakeholder theory
- Strategic alignment
- Vision statement
- XML editor
