= Vision statement =

Future position of an organization

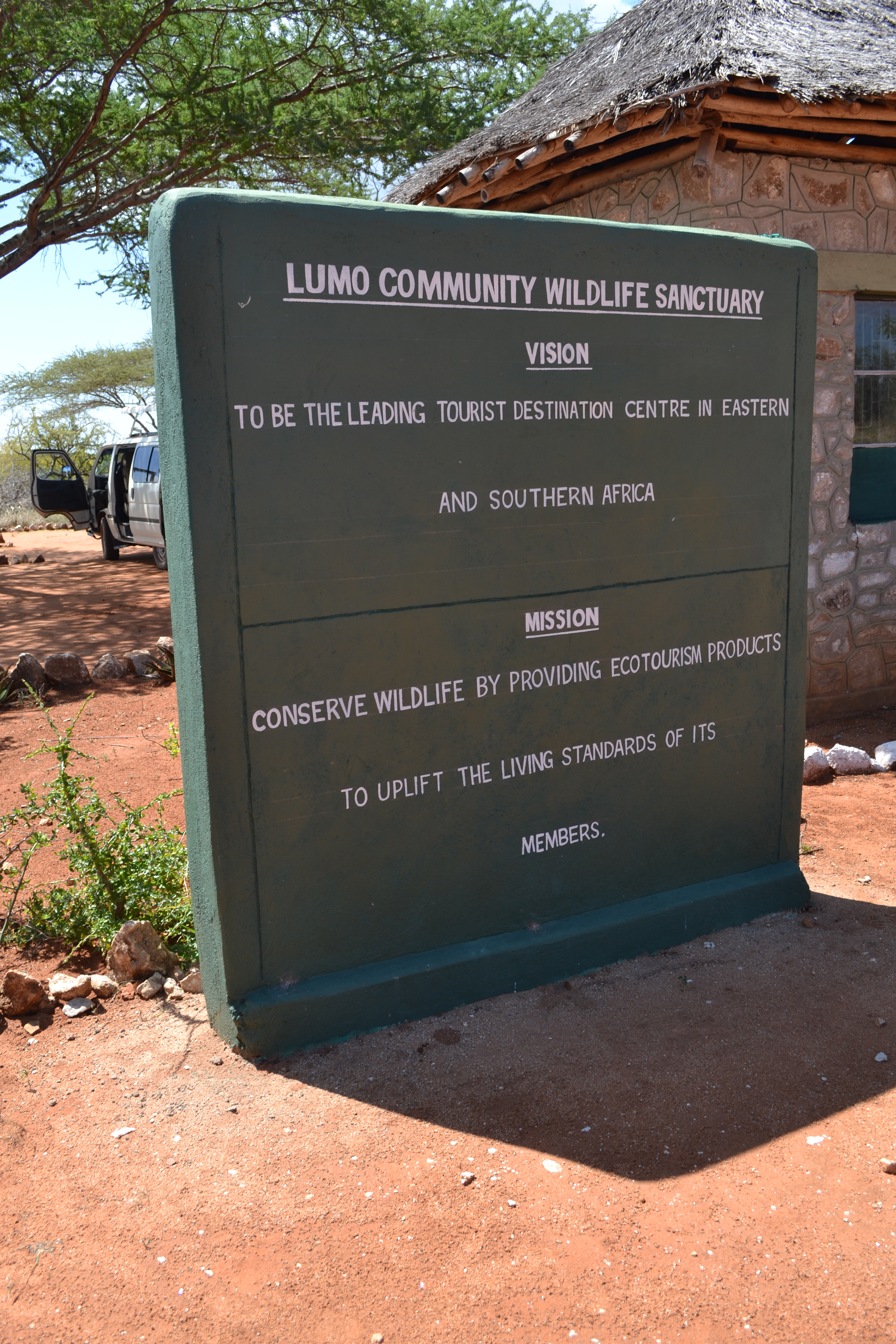
The vision and mission statements of the LUMO Community Wildlife Sanctuary

A vision statement is a high-level, inspirational statement of an idealistic emotional future of a company or group. Vision describes the basic human emotion that a founder intends to be experienced by the people the organization interacts with.

Vision statements may fill the following functions for a company:

- Serve as foundations for a broader strategic plan.
- Motivate existing employees and attract potential employees by clearly categorizing the company's goals and attracting like-minded individuals.
- Focus company efforts and facilitate the creation of core competencies by directing the company to only focus on strategic opportunities that advance the company's vision.
- Help companies differentiate from competitors.

== Characteristics ==
A consensus does not exist on the characteristics of a "good" or "bad" vision statement. Commonly cited traits include:

- concise: able to be easily remembered and repeated
- clear: defines a prime goal
- time horizon: defines a time horizon
- future-oriented: describes where the company is going rather than the current state
- stable: offers a long-term perspective and is unlikely to be impacted by market or technology changes
- challenging: not something that can be easily met and discarded
- abstract: general enough to encompass all of the organization's interests and strategic direction
- inspiring: motivates employees and is something that employees view as desirable

== See also ==
- Strategic planning
- Mission statement
- Strategy Markup Language
