= Adversarial purchasing =

An adversarial relationship in purchasing and supply arises when identical or equivalent good or services are available from competing suppliers and buyers/sellers are trying to gain an advantage over each other. Low levels of trust are characteristic of adversarial relationships.

Adversarial purchasing is a form of strategic management designed to take advantage of competition for a buyer's business in business-to-business relationships while simultaneously lowering the firm's dependence on a single supplier. Successful implementation of this strategy can lower the firm's prices and raise the service and attention gained from its suppliers.
