= Business performance management =

Processes to bring output into alignment with goals

Business Performance Management
Discipline Overview
- Other names: Corporate Performance Management (CPM), Enterprise Performance Management (EPM)
- Core objective: Optimization of business results and alignment with strategy

Methodologies
- Frameworks: Balanced Scorecard, Six Sigma, OKR, Total Quality Management
- Key Metrics: KPIs, ROI, ROE

Technical Components
- Tools: Business intelligence, Data warehousing, Data mining
- Cycle: Plan, Act, Monitor, Analyze

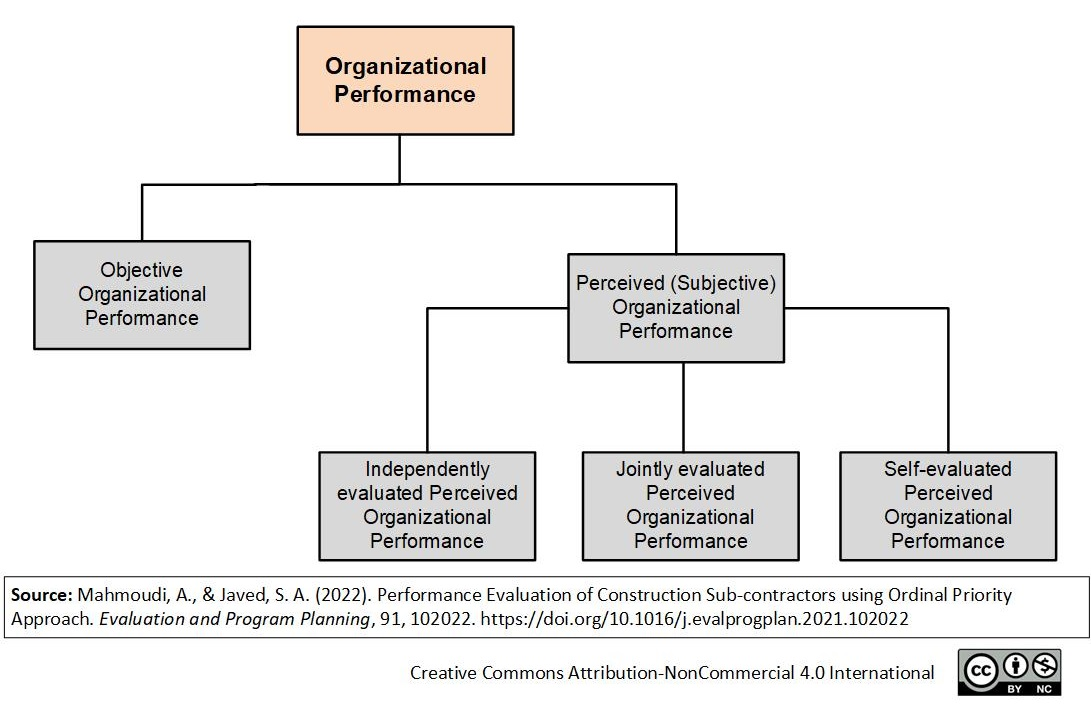
Organizational performance and its types

Business performance management (BPM) (also known as corporate performance management (CPM) enterprise performance management (EPM),) is a management approach that uses processes and analytical tools intended to assess the extent to which a business organization's activities and outputs align with its goals. BPM is associated with business process management, a larger framework managing organizational processes.

Performance management may focus on the performance of an entire organization, a department, an employee, or the processes in place to manage particular tasks. Performance standards are set by senior leadership and task owners which may include expectations for job duties, timely feedback and coaching, evaluating employee performance and behavior against desired outcomes, and implementing reward systems. BPM can involve outlining the role of each individual in an organization in terms of functions and responsibilities.

== History ==
The concept of Corporate Performance Management was introduced by Gartner in 2001. Lee Geishecker from Gartner defined CPM as "an umbrella term describing the methodologies, metrics, processes and systems used to monitor and manage an enterprise’s business performance."

By 2017, Gartner had reclassified CPM as "financial planning and analysis" (FP&A) and "financial close" to reflect an increased focus on planning and the emergence of new solutions for financial close management.

Following the 2017 reclassification, the market transitioned from monolithic on-premises suites toward cloud-based "Best-of-Breed" solutions, leading Gartner to officially retire the "Corporate Performance Management" (CPM) Magic Quadrant in 2018 in favor of two distinct categories: Cloud Financial Planning and Analysis (FP&A) and Cloud Financial Close.

In 2020, this evolution continued with the introduction of Extended Planning and Analysis (xP&A), a framework designed to integrate financial planning with operational data from departments such as sales, human resources, and supply chain into a single, unified planning environment.

== Definition and scope ==
New technology realizes corporate strategic outcomes and describes risk-management programs.

== Application ==
Performance management principles are commonly applied in the workplace, but they can also be used in other settings where individuals interact with their environment to achieve specific outcomes, such as healthcare. The effective implementation of performance management is crucial for maximizing team potential and enhancing daily employee performance.. It must not encourage internal competition, but teamwork, cooperation, and trust.

Performance management aligns company goals with those of teams and employees to increase efficiency, productivity, and profitability. Its guidelines stipulate the activities and outcomes by which employees and teams are evaluated during performance appraisal. Many types of organizations use performance management systems (PMS) to evaluate themselves according to their targets, objectives, and goals; a research institute may use PMS to evaluate its success in reaching development targets. Complex performance drivers such as the societal contribution of research may be evaluated with other performance drivers, such as research commercialization and collaborations, in sectors like commercial agriculture. A research institute may implement data-driven, real-time PMS to address complex performance management challenges in a country developing its agricultural sector..

Werner Erhard, Michael C. Jensen, and their colleagues developed a new approach to improving performance in organizations. Their work emphasizes how constraints imposed by one's worldview can impede cognitive abilities, and explores the source of performance which is inaccessible by cause-and-effect analysis. They say that a person's performance correlates with their work situation, and language (including what is said and unsaid in conversations) plays a major role. Performance is more likely to be improved when management understands how employees perceive the world and implementing changes which are compatible with that worldview.

== Public-sector effects ==
In the public sector, the effects of performance-management systems have ranged from positive to negative; this suggests that differences among systems and the context in which they are implemented affect their success or failure.

== How it can fail ==
Employees who question the fairness of a performance-management system or are overly competitive will affect its effectiveness; those who do not feel adequately rewarded become disgruntled with the process. Without proper system planning, employees may view it as mandating compliance.

== Organizational development ==
In organizational development (OD), performance can be thought of as actual versus desired results; where actual results fall short of those desired is the performance-improvement zone. Performance improvement aims to close the gap between the two.

Other organizational-development definitions differ slightly. According to the U.S. Office of Personnel Management (OPM), performance management is a system or process in which work is planned and expectations are set; performance of the work is monitored; staff ability to perform is developed; performance is rated and the ratings summarized, and top performance is rewarded.

== Design and implementation ==
An organization-wide 360-degree feedback process integrated into the organization's culture can be a powerful tool for communicating and instituting change, rapidly touching all members of the organization when new markets, strategies, values and structures are introduced into the system. Each year, companies spend considerable money on their performance-management systems. For performance management to succeed, businesses must continue to adapt their system to correct current deficiencies. Some aspects, such as goal setting or performance bonuses, may resonate more with employees than others.

=== Outcomes ===
According to Richard et al. (2009), organizational-performance metrics encompass three outcomes:

- Financial performance, such as profits, return on assets, and return on investment
- Product market performance, such as sales and market share
- Total shareholder return, economic value added, and similar

Organizational effectiveness is a similar term.

== Technology ==
Business performance management requires large organizations to collect and report large volumes of data. Software vendors, particularly those offering business intelligence tools, provide products to assist in this process. BPM is often incorrectly understood as relying on software to function, and many definitions suggest that software is essential to the approach. Interest in BPM by the software community may be sales-driven.

== See also ==
- Behavioral systems analysis
- Data and information visualization
- Electronic performance support systems
- Executive information systems
- Integrated business planning
- IT performance management
- List of management topics
- Operational performance management
- Organizational behavior management
- Organizational engineering
- PDCA
- Performance measurement
- Rosabeth Moss Kanter
- Vitality curve (a.k.a. stack ranking)
- Strategy Markup Language and particularly StratML Part 2, Performance Plans and Reports
