= List of Northwestern University alumni =

This list of Northwestern University alumni includes notable graduates and non-graduate former students of Northwestern University, located in Evanston, Illinois.

== Academia ==
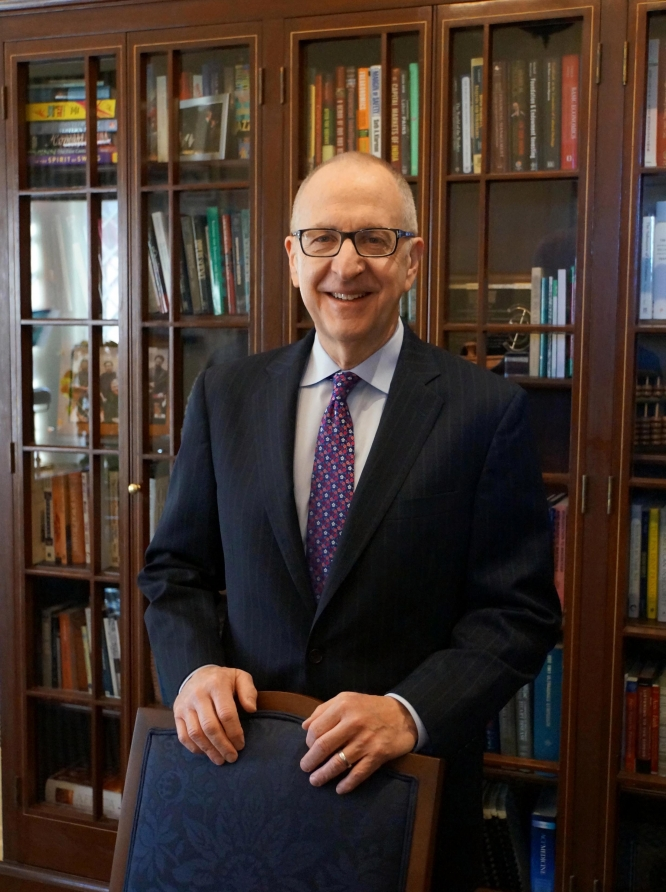
David J. Skorton

- Madeleine Wing Adler (B.A. 1962), president, West Chester University
- Amy Allen (Ph.D. 1996), Parents Distinguished Research Professor in the Humanities and professor of philosophy, Dartmouth College
- Diane Marie Amann (J.D. 1986), associate dean for international programs & strategic initiatives and Emily & Ernest Woodruff Chair in International Law, University of Georgia School of Law
- Alida Anderson (M.A. 2004), author and widely published researcher; faculty at American University
- Elijah Anderson (Ph.D. 1976), William K. Lanman, Jr. professor of sociology, Yale University
- Andrew Armacost (B.S. 1989), dean of faculty, United States Air Force Academy
- Lionel Barthold, electrical engineer
- Gershon Ben-Shakhar (born 1942), Israeli psychologist; former president of the Open University of Israel
- Steven Berry (B.A. 1980), Sterling Professor of Economics at Yale University
- Vincent Blasi (B.A. 1964), free speech theorist, professor at Columbia Law School
- Clinton Bristow, Jr. (B.A. 1971), former president, Alcorn State University
- Joseph L. Bull (M.S. 1995, Ph.D. 2000), dean of the Maseeh College of Engineering and Computer Science, Portland State University
- James Burkee (Ph.D. 2003), president, Avila University
- Margery C. Carlson (B.S. 1916), professor of botany, Northwestern University
- Joyce Chaplin (B.A. 1982), James Duncan Phillips Professor of Early American History, Harvard University
- K. T. Chau (Ph.D. 1991), chair professor of geotechnical engineering, former associate dean of Faculty of Construction and Land Use, and former associate head of Department of Civil and Environmental Engineering The Hong Kong Polytechnic University
- Erwin Chemerinsky (B.S. 1975), dean, University of California, Berkeley School of Law
- Vivek Chibber (B.A. 1987, Political Science), professor of sociology at New York University
- G. Marcus Cole (J.D. 1993), Joseph A. Matson Dean of the Law School and Professor of Law, University of Notre Dame
- Johnnetta B. Cole (M.A. 1959, Ph.D. 1967), president emerita, Spelman College; president, Bennett College
- Juan Cole (B.A. 1975), Richard P. Mitchell Collegiate Professor of History, University of Michigan
- James Hal Cone (M.A. 1963, Ph.D. 1965), Charles A. Briggs Distinguished Professor of Systematic Theology, Union Theological Seminary in the City of New York
- Elizabeth Creamer (B.S. 1970), professor emerita of Educational Research and Evaluation at Virginia Tech
- Margaret Cuninggim, dean of women at the University of Tennessee and at Vanderbilt University
- Michele Dauber (JD 1998, PhD 2003), law professor at the Stanford Law School
- Stefanie DeLuca (Ph.D., 2002), professor of sociology, Johns Hopkins University, author of Coming of Age in the Other America
- Naomi Pollard Dobson (A.B. 1905), librarian and educator, first African American to receive a degree from Northwestern
- William C. Dudley (M.A. 1995, Ph.D. 1998), president, Washington and Lee University
- Mitchell Duneier (B.A.), professor of sociology, Princeton University
- Troy Duster (B.A. 1957, Ph.D. 1962), professor of sociology, New York University and University of California, Berkeley
- Lee Edelman (B.A. 1975), Fletcher Professor of English Literature, Tufts University
- Kathryn Edin (Ph.D. 1991), professor of sociology, Princeton University
- Virgilio Enriquez (M.A. 1970, Ph.D. 1971), founder of Filipino psychology school of thought; professor of social psychology, University of the Philippines Diliman
- Fred D. Fagg, Jr., former president, University of Southern California
- William R. Ferris (M.A. 1965), Joel Williamson Eminent Professor of History, University of North Carolina at Chapel Hill
- Stacey Finley (Ph.D.), science professor at University of Southern California
- Brittany Friedman, Assistant Professor of Sociology at the University of Southern California
- Susan Fuhrman (B.A. 1965, M.A. 1966), president, Teachers College, Columbia University
- Simon Gikandi (Ph.D., 1986), Robert Schirmer Professor of English, Princeton University
- Larry Gladney (B.A., 1979), physicist, professor of Physics and the Phyllis A. Wallace Dean of Diversity and Faculty Development at Yale University
- Barry Glassner (B.S. 1974), executive vice provost and professor of sociology, University of Southern California
- Avner Greif (M.A. 1988, Ph.D. 1989), Bowman Family Endowed Professor in Humanities & Sciences, Stanford University
- Herbert S. Hadley (LL.B), chancellor of Washington University in St. Louis (1923–1927), governor of Missouri
- Geoffrey Galt Harpham (B.A. 1968), director, National Humanities Center
- Cynthia Herrup (B.S.J. 1972, Ph.D. 1982), professor of history and law, University of Southern California
- Rosanna Hertz (M.A. 1977, Ph.D. 1983), Luella LaMer Professor of Sociology and Women's Studies, Wellesley College
- John B. Hogenesch (Ph.D. 1999), professor of pharmacology, University of Pennsylvania
- Michael J. Hopkins (B.A. 1979, Ph.D. 1984), professor of mathematics, Harvard University
- Frank E. Horton (Ph.D. 1968), chancellor of University of Wisconsin–Milwaukee (1980–1985), University of Oklahoma (1985–1988) and University of Toledo (1989–1998)
- Ruth Horsting (B.A. 1940, M.F.A. 1959), professor emerita of art at University of California, Davis (1959–1971)
- Louis Kaplow (B.A. 1977), Finn M. W. Caspersen and Household International Professor of Law and Economics at Harvard Law School
- Jonathan D. Katz (Ph.D. 1996), former head of Larry Kramer Initiative for Lesbian and Gay Studies, Yale University
- Joann (Wheeler) Kealiinohomoku (M.A. 1965), anthropologist and dance researcher
- Marc W. Kirschner (B.A. 1966), John Franklin Enders University Professor and professor of systems biology, Harvard University
- Samara Klar (M.A. 2009, Ph.D. 2013), political scientist and founder of Women Also Know Stuff
- Kristen Kroll, professor of Developmental Biology at Washington University School of Medicine
- Nirmalya Kumar (Ph.D. 1991), professor of marketing and director of Aditya Birla India Centre at London Business School; included in Thinkers50
- Zachary Leader (B.A.), professor of English, Roehampton University
- Lee Hyang-sook (Ph.D. 1993), president, Ewha Womans University and Korean Mathematical Society
- Hilary M. Lips (M.A. 1973, Ph.D. 1974), emerita professor and research faculty in Psychology at Radford University
- Michael Lounsbury (PhD 1999), professor of strategic management, organizations and sociology at the University of Alberta
- Glenn Loury (B.A. 1972), Merton P. Stoltz Professor of the Social Sciences, Brown University
- Jody Lulich (B.A. 1979), Osborne/Hills Endowed Chair in Nephrology and Urology
- Mark Crispin Miller (B.A. 1971), professor of media ecology, New York University
- James Elliott Moore II (B.S. 1981), professor emeritus of Industrial and Systems Engineering at University of Southern California
- Ed Morgan (B.A. 1976), professor of international law at the University of Toronto
- Lenny Moss (Ph.D. 1998), philosopher of biology
- Kathleen M. Murray (D.Mus.), 21st president of Hamline University, 14th president of Whitman College
- George Nemhauser (Ph.D. 1961), A. Russell Chandler III Chair and institute professor, Georgia Institute of Technology
- J. Dennis O'Connor (Ph.D. 1968), former chancellor, University of Pittsburgh
- Daniel Oerther (B.A. 1995, B.S. 1995), Mathes Chair of Environmental Engineering, Missouri University of Science and Technology
- Margaret O'Mara (B.A. 1992), Howard & Frances Keller Endowed Professor of History, University of Washington
- William Padula (B.S. 2006), professor of Pharmaceutical & Health Economics, University of Southern California
- Scott E. Page (M.S. 1990, Ph.D. 1993), Leonid Hurwicz Collegiate Professor of complex systems, political science, and economics, University of Michigan
- Deborah Paredez (Ph.D. 2002), professor of theatre and dance at University of Texas at Austin, poet and co-founder of Cantomundo
- Charles M. Payne (Ph.D. 1976), Frank P. Hixon Distinguished Service Professor in the School of Social Service Administration, University of Chicago
- Ralph Pearson (Ph.D. 1943), professor of chemistry, University of California, Santa Barbara
- Benjamin Polak (M.A. 1986), William C. Brainard Professor of Economics, Yale University
- Jack Nusan Porter (Ph.D. 1971), sociologist; former Research Associate in Ukrainian Studies, Harvard University; former assistant professor in Social Science, Boston University
- Lyman W. Porter (B.A. 1952), dean of UC Irvine Paul Merage School of Business 1972–1983
- Adam Przeworski (Ph.D. 1966), Carroll and Milton Petrie Professor of European Studies, New York University
- Mark Ratner (Ph.D. 1969), Lawrence B. Dumas Distinguished University Professor of Chemistry, Northwestern University
- David R. Roediger (Ph.D. 1980), professor of history, University of Illinois at Urbana–Champaign
- Said Sheikh Samatar (Ph.D. 1979), professor of history, Rutgers University
- Norbert M. Samuelson, scholar of Jewish philosophy at Arizona State University and prolific writer and lecturer
- John B. Simpson (Ph.D. 1973), president, University at Buffalo, The State University of New York
- David J. Skorton (B.A. 1970, M.D. 1974), president, Cornell University
- Graham Spanier (Ph.D. 1973), president, Pennsylvania State University
- Barbara Maria Stafford (B.A. 1964, M.A. 1966), William B. Ogden Distinguished Service Professor of Art History, University of Chicago
- Grover C. Stephens (B.A. 1948, M.A. 1949, Ph.D. 1952), dean, UC Irvine Charlie Dunlop School of Biological Sciences
- George Stigler (MBA 1932), Nobel Prize in Economics (1982)
- Richard J. Stonesifer (M.A. 1947), president of Monmouth University
- Roger Taylor (J.D. 1971), president, Knox College
- Martha Tedeschi (Ph.D. 1994), Elizabeth and John Moors Cabot Director of the Harvard Art Museums
- Stephan Thernstrom (B.A. 1956), Winthrop Professor of History, Harvard University
- Augusta Read Thomas (B.M. 1987), university professor of composition, University of Chicago
- France Winddance Twine (B.S., 1980), professor of sociology at University of California, Santa Barbara
- Glen L. Urban (Ph.D. 1966), dean emeritus of MIT Sloan School of Management
- Leonard Wantchekon (Ph.D. 1995), James Madison Professor of Political Economy and Professor of Politics and International Affairs, Princeton University
- Winifred O. Whelan (Ph.D. 1985), member of the School Sisters of St. Francis, academic, writer, and Wikipedian
- David L. Woodruff (Ph.D. 1990), Distinguished Professor of Management at the University of California, Davis
- John E. Worthen (B.S. 1954), president of Ball State University (1984–2000)

== Arts and entertainment (film, TV, and theatre) ==
Ann-Margret

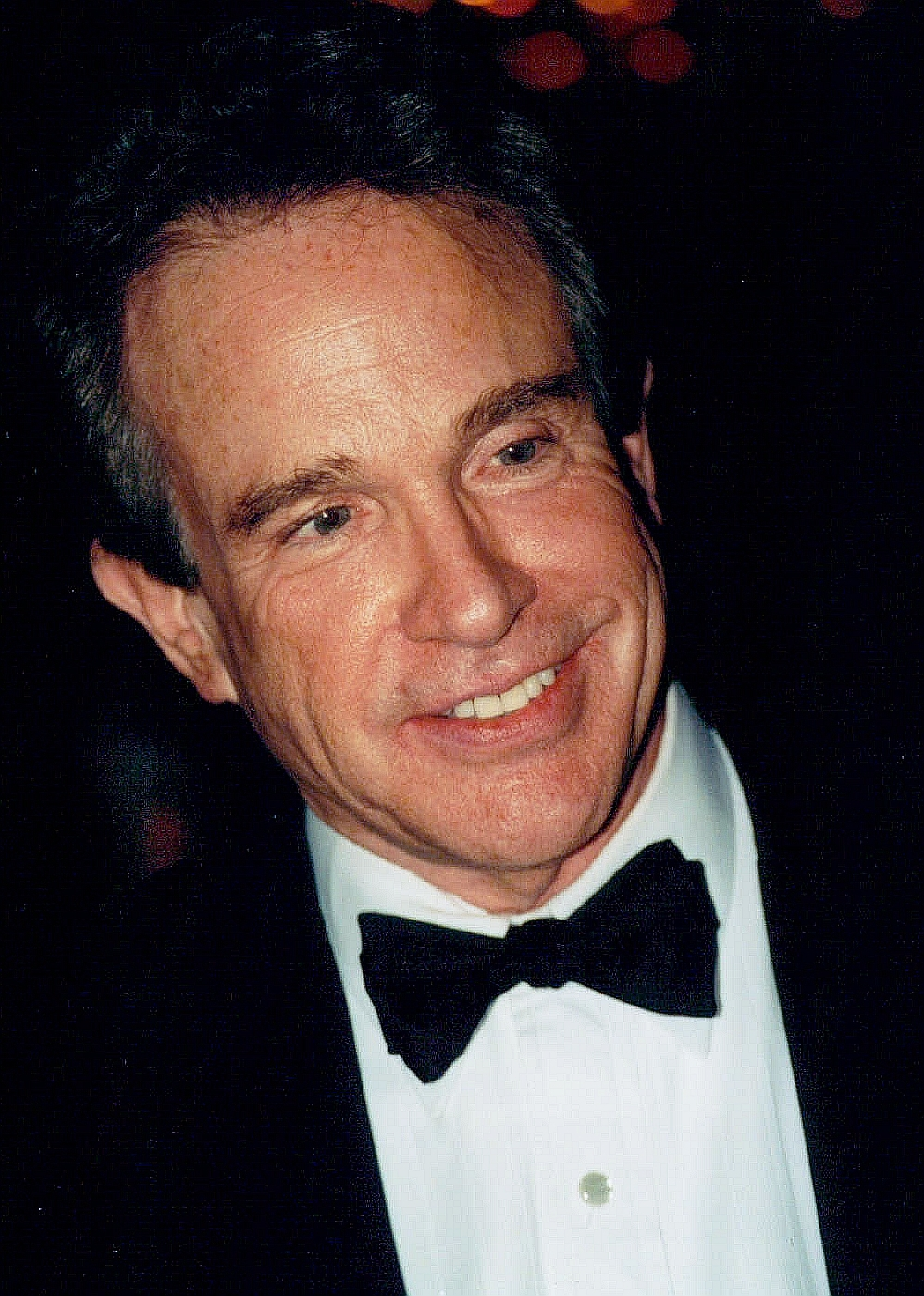
Warren Beatty

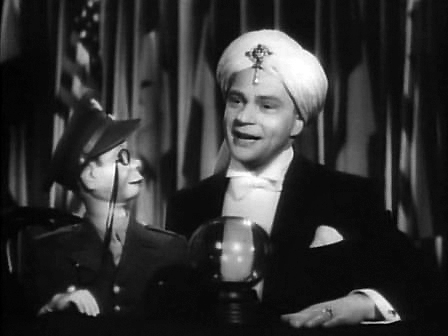
Edgar Bergen

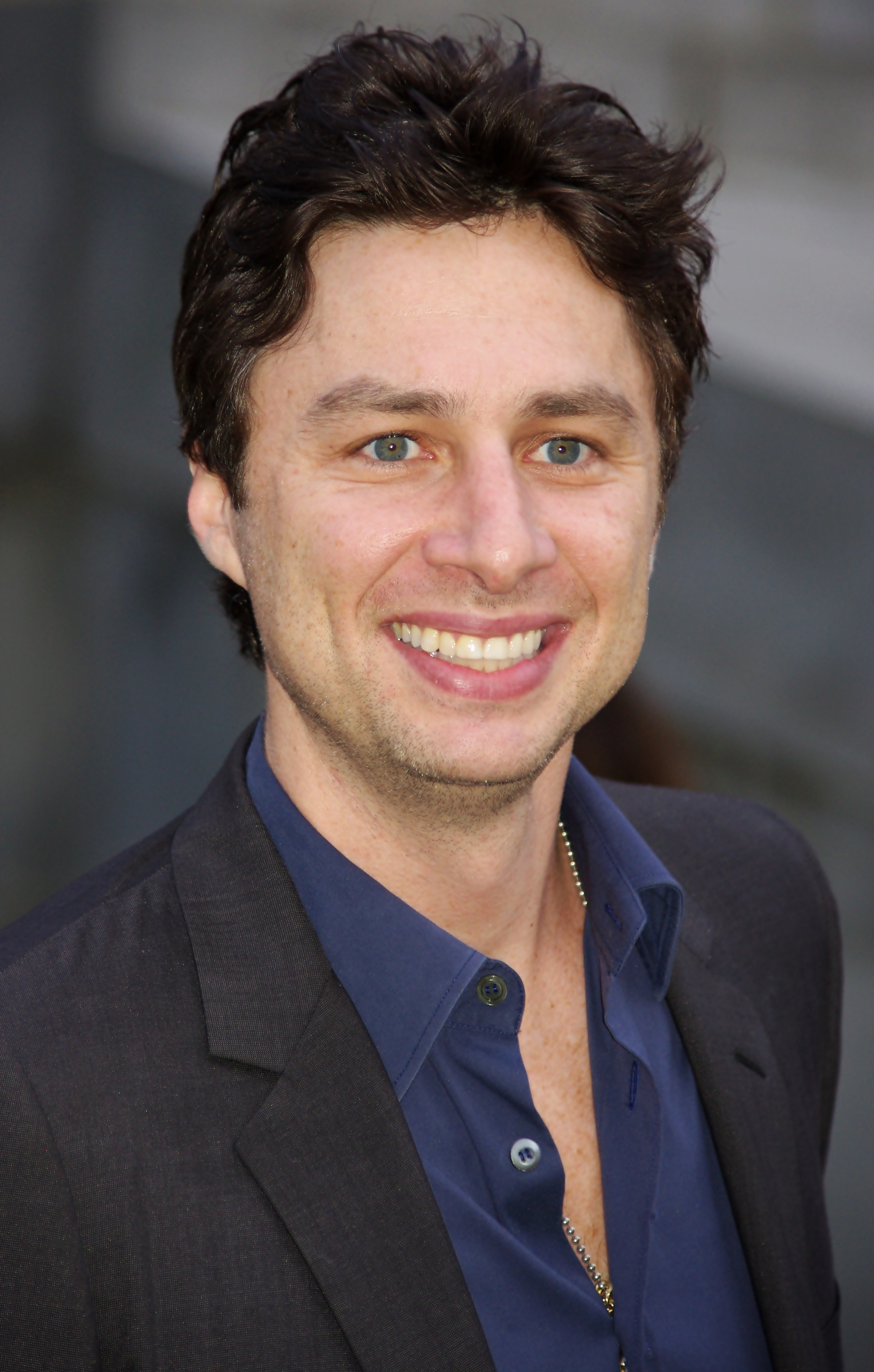
Zach Braff

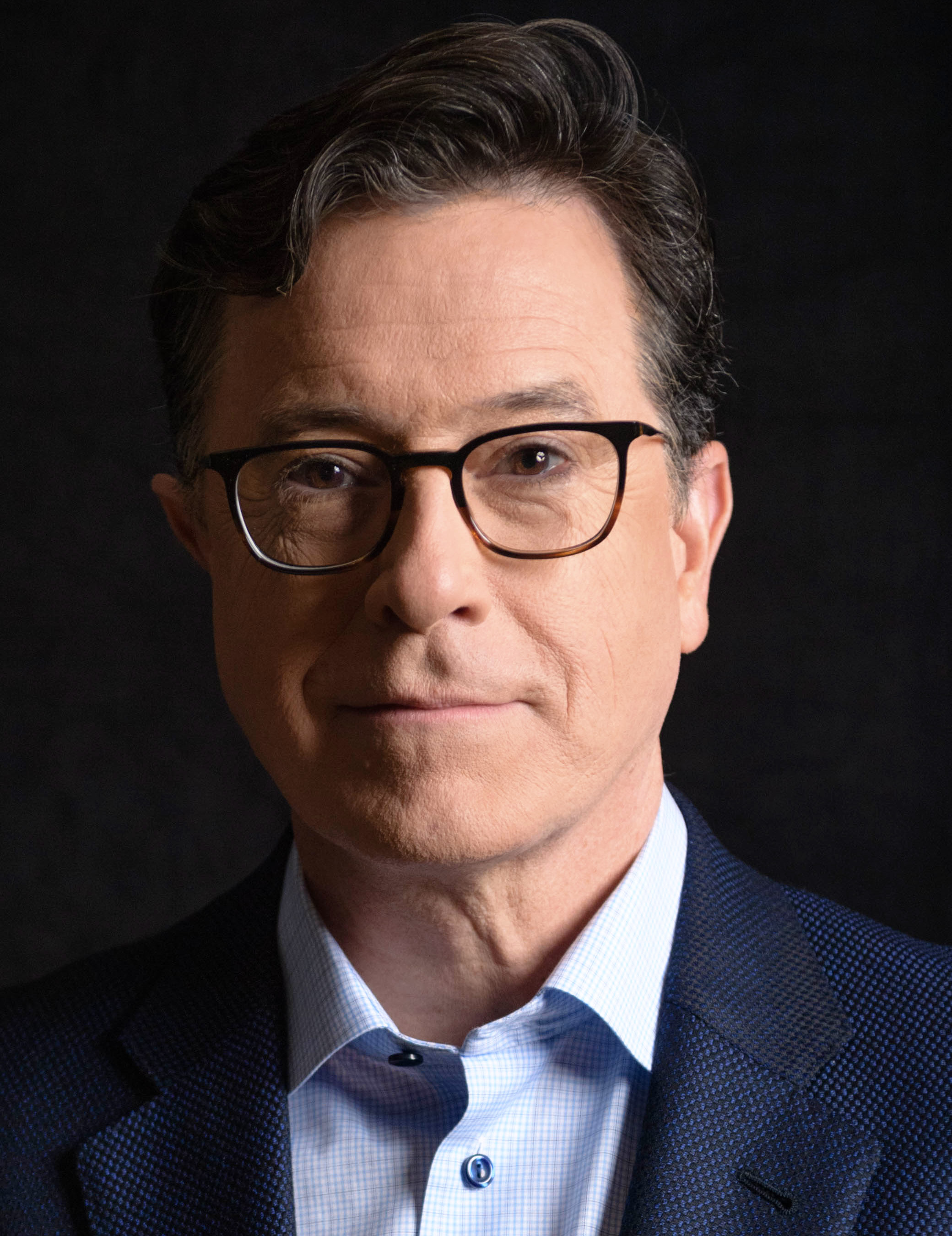
Stephen Colbert

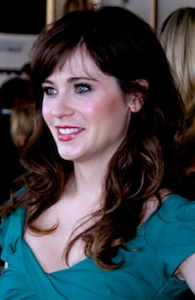
Zooey Deschanel

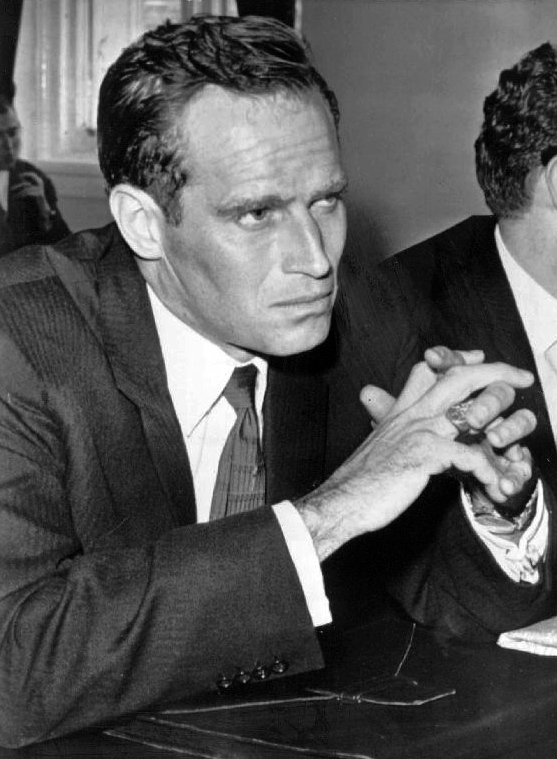
Charlton Heston

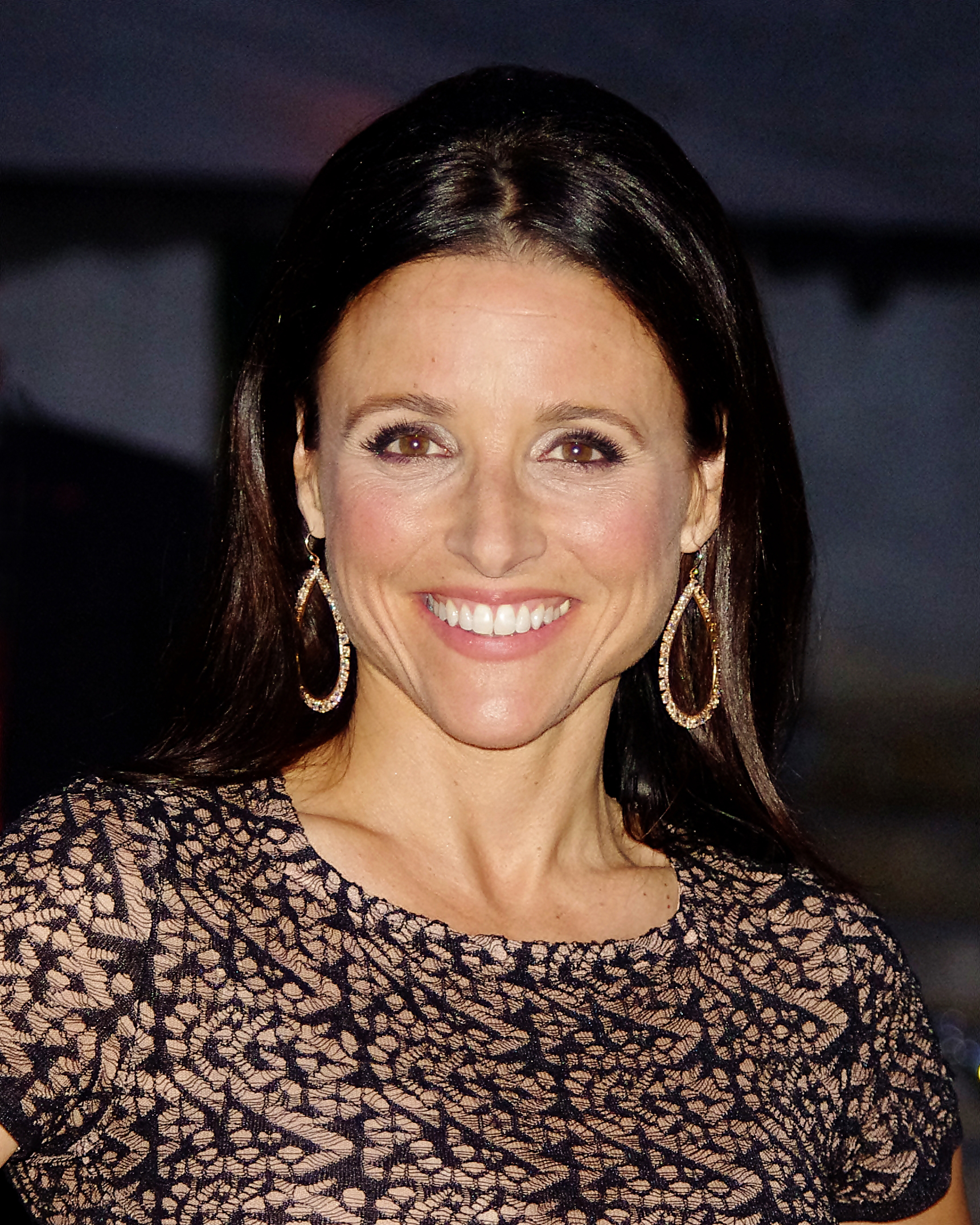
Julia Louis-Dreyfus

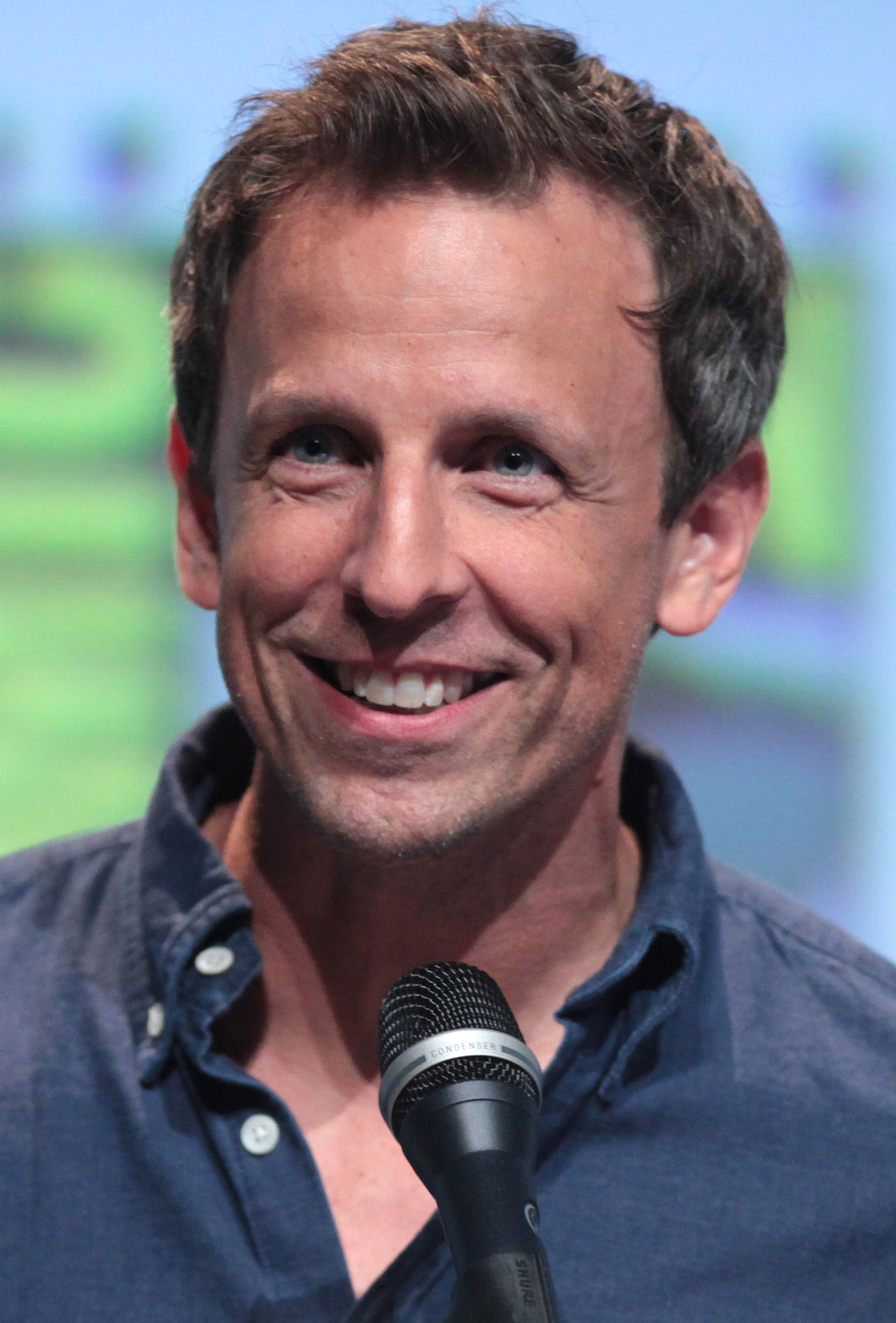
Seth Meyers

- Adi Shankar (B.A. 2007), executive producer of "Devil May Cry" and " Castlevania, youngest producer to have a number one film at the North American box office with the 2012 film "The Grey"
- Jun Sung Ahn (B.A. 2015), musician, YouTuber
- Mara Brock Akil (B.A. 1992), creator and executive producer of Girlfriends and The Game, former supervising producer of The Jamie Foxx Show
- Claude Akins (B.S. 1949), actor (Inherit the Wind, Battle for the Planet of the Apes, The Misadventures of Sheriff Lobo)
- Ann-Margret (never graduated), Academy Award-nominated actress (Tommy, Carnal Knowledge)
- Christopher Anselmo, composer and playwright
- Maude Apatow (did not graduate), Euphoria
- Sharif Atkins (B.S. 1999), actor (ER)
- Jayne Atkinson (B.S. 1981), Tony Award-nominated actress (Enchanted April, The Rainmaker); played Karen Hayes on 24 and U.S. Secretary of State Catherine Durant on House of Cards
- Jane Badler (B.S. 1976), actress (V)
- Kate Baldwin, actress (1997, theater school)
- Bonnie Bartlett (B.S. 1950), Emmy Award-winning actress (St. Elsewhere, Twins, Ghosts of Mississippi)
- Warren Beatty (class of 1959, never graduated), Academy Award-winning actor/writer/director (Bonnie and Clyde, McCabe & Mrs. Miller, Shampoo, Reds)
- Lee Phillip Bell (B.A. 1950), Emmy Award-winning co-creator of The Young and the Restless and The Bold and the Beautiful
- Matt Bellassai, comedian (podcast Whine About It)
- Rob Benedict (B.S. 1993), actor (Threshold, Felicity)
- Richard Benjamin (B.S. 1960), actor (Catch-22, Westworld, The Last of Sheila); director (My Favorite Year, Mermaids)
- Edgar Bergen (attended, did not graduate), Academy Award-winning actor and ventriloquist (Charlie McCarthy)
- Greg Berlanti (B.S. 1994), screenwriter and producer (Dawson's Creek); creator of Everwood and Jack & Bobby; writer/director of Broken Hearts Club
- Eric Bernt (B.S. 1986), screenwriter (Surviving the Game, Virtuosity, Romeo Must Die)
- Craig Bierko (B.S. 1986), actor (Cinderella Man, The Thirteenth Floor); Tony Award nominee (The Music Man)
- Karen Black (attended, never graduated), Academy Award-nominated actress (Easy Rider, Five Easy Pieces)
- Jeff Blumenkrantz (B.S. 1986), Tony Award-nominated musical theatre composer/lyricist (Urban Cowboy)
- Zach Braff (B.S. 1997), Emmy Award-nominated actor (Scrubs); writer/director (Garden State, Wish I Was Here)
- Cary Brothers (B.S. 1995), Grammy-nominated musician (Garden State)
- Clancy Brown (B.S. 1981), actor (Highlander, The Shawshank Redemption); voice of Mr. Krabs on SpongeBob SquarePants
- Charles Busch (B.S. 1976), Tony Award-nominated playwright (The Tale of the Allergist's Wife)
- Frank Buxton (B.S. 1951), actor/writer/director
- Bruno Campos (B.S. 1995), actor (Nip/Tuck)
- Katie Chang (B.A. 2017), actress ("The Bling Ring")
- Josh Chetwynd, UK-based baseball analyst and former player
- Cindy Chupack (B.S. 1987), Emmy Award-winning executive producer and writer (Sex and the City, Everybody Loves Raymond)
- Jack Clay, acting teacher/director/actor
- Jeanne Clemson (M.A.), theater director, stage actress and teacher, preserved the Fulton Opera House
- Claire Coffee, actress (General Hospital, Grimm)
- Stephen Colbert (B.S. 1986), Emmy Award-winning comedian (The Colbert Report, The Daily Show with Jon Stewart, The Late Show with Stephen Colbert)
- Kate Collins, actress (All My Children)
- Robert Conrad (B.S. 1955), actor (The Wild Wild West, Baa Baa Black Sheep, Hawaiian Eye)
- Steven Conrad (B.A. 1991), screenwriter (The Pursuit of Happyness, The Weather Man)
- J. Anthony Crane (B.S. 1993), actor (The Big Easy, The Lion King)
- Cindy Crawford (attended, never graduated), model
- Jan Crull Jr. (attended, never graduated), filmmaker, Native American rights activist, attorney
- Jane Curtin (attended, never graduated), original cast member of Saturday Night Live; Emmy Award-nominated actress (Kate & Allie, 3rd Rock from the Sun)
- Stephanie D'Abruzzo (B.S. 1993), Tony Award-nominated actress and puppeteer (Avenue Q)
- William Daniels (B.S. 1950), Emmy Award-winning actor (St. Elsewhere, Boy Meets World); former president of the Screen Actors Guild
- Zooey Deschanel (attended, never graduated), actress (Yes Man, Elf, Almost Famous, New Girl)
- Lydia R. Diamond (B.S. 1992), playwright
- Matt Doherty (B.S. 1999), actor (So I Married an Axe Murderer, The Mighty Ducks films)
- Anne Dudek, actress (House, Psych, Law and Order: CI, Desperate Housewives, How I Met Your Mother, Mad Men, White Chicks, The Human Stain)
- Teddy Dunn (B.S. 2003), actor (Veronica Mars)
- Richard Durham, creator of the radio series Destination Freedom
- Nancy Dussault (B.A. 1957), actress (Too Close for Comfort); two-time Tony Award nominee (Do Re Mi, Bajour)
- Gregg Edelman (B.S. 1980), Tony Award-nominated actor (City of Angels, Into the Woods)
- Billy Eichner, comedian, actor
- Jennie Eisenhower (B.S. 2000), actress; granddaughter of Richard Nixon and the great-granddaughter of Dwight D. Eisenhower
- Temi Epstein (B.S. 1996), child actress (North and South)
- Joe Flynn, actor (McHale's Navy)
- Mary Frann (B.S. 1965), actress (Newhart, Days of Our Lives)
- Gerald Freedman (B.S. 1949, M.A. 1950), theatre director (The Gay Life, The Robber Bridegroom, The Grand Tour)
- David T. Friendly (B.S. 1978), Academy Award-nominated producer (Little Miss Sunshine)
- Penny Fuller (B.S. 1959), Emmy Award-winning actress (The Elephant Man); Tony Award nominee (The Dinner Party)
- Ziwe Fumudoh (B.A. 2014), comedian, writer (Ziwe, Desus & Mero)
- George Furth (B.S. 1955), Tony Award-winning playwright (Company); actor (Butch Cassidy and the Sundance Kid)
- Daniele Gaither (B.S. 1993), actress, comic (MADtv)
- Frank Galati (B.A. 1965), Tony Award-winning director (The Grapes of Wrath), Academy Award-nominated screenwriter (The Accidental Tourist)
- Aimee Garcia (B.S. 2000), actress (George Lopez)
- Ana Gasteyer (B.S. 1989), actress (Mean Girls, Wicked); former cast member of Saturday Night Live
- Ileen Getz (B.S. 1985), actress (3rd Rock from the Sun)
- Nicole Gibbons (B.S. 2003), interior designer and television personality
- Gibi ASMR (B.A. 2017), cosplayer, YouTuber and ASMRtist
- Zach Gilford (B.S. 2004), actor (Friday Night Lights)
- Eric Gilliland (B.S. 1984), writer/producer (Rosanne, My Boys)
- Ira Glass (attended, transferred), radio and TV personality
- Jonathan Glassner, TV writer/producer, most known for developing Stargate SG-1
- Dody Goodman, film and television actress
- Virginia Graham (M.S.J.), former daytime TV talk show host
- Michael Greif (B.S. 1981), Tony Award-nominated director of Rent and Grey Gardens
- Mamie Gummer (B.S. 2005), actress (Evening), daughter of Meryl Streep
- Anna Gunn (B.S. 1990), Emmy Award-winning actress (Deadwood, Breaking Bad)
- Kathryn Hahn (B.S. 1995), actress (Crossing Jordan, Step Brothers, Anchorman: The Legend of Ron Burgundy, We're the Millers)
- Brad Hall (B.S. 1990), former cast member of Saturday Night Live; creator of The Single Guy, Watching Ellie
- Samantha Harris (B.S. 1996), Emmy Award-nominated co-host of Dancing with the Stars
- Bill Hayes (M.M. 1949), Daytime Emmy Award-nominated actor (Days of Our Lives)
- Heather Headley (B.S. 1997), Tony Award-winning actress and singer (Aida, The Lion King); Grammy Award-nominated R&B vocalist
- Kyle T. Heffner, actor, Flashdance
- Marg Helgenberger (B.S. 1982), Emmy Award-winning actress (CSI: Crime Scene Investigation, China Beach, Erin Brockovich)
- Charlton Heston (attended 1941–1943), Academy Award-winning actor (Ben-Hur) and National Rifle Association president
- Michael Hitchcock (B.S. 1980), writer, co-executive producer (MADTv); actor (Waiting for Guffman, Best in Show, Serenity)
- Ron Holgate (B.S. 1959), Tony Award-winning actor (1776, The Grand Tour)
- David Hollander (B.S. 1990), creator, screenwriter, and executive producer of The Guardian
- David Horowitz (M.S. 1961), former host of Fight Back! With David Horowitz
- Jeffrey Hunter (B.A. 1949), actor (The Searchers, The Last Hurrah, King of Kings, The Longest Day)
- Lew Hunter (M.S. 1956), Emmy Award-nominated screenwriter (Fallen Angel); chairman emeritus and professor of screenwriting, UCLA School of Theater Film and Television
- Ron Husmann (B.S. 1959), Tony Award-nominated actor (Tenderloin)
- Martha Hyer (B.S. 1945), Academy Award-nominated actress (Some Came Running, Houseboat, The Sons of Katie Elder, Bikini Beach)
- Rex Ingram, actor (Cabin in the Sky, The Thief of Baghdad, Sahara, Green Pastures)
- Laura Innes (B.S. 1979), Emmy Award-nominated actress (ER); Emmy Award-nominated director (The West Wing)
- David Israel (B.S.J. 1973), writer and producer (Midnight Caller, Turks, Tremors, Pandora's Clock, Mutiny, House of Frankenstein)
- David Ives (B.A. 1971), playwright (All in the Timing)
- Brian d'Arcy James (B.S. 1990), Tony Award-nominated actor (Sweet Smell of Success: The Musical)
- Tim Johnson (B.A. 1983), director (Antz, Sinbad: Legend of the Seven Seas)
- Traci Paige Johnson (B.A. 1991), creator of Blue's Clues
- Jennifer Jones, Academy Award-winning actress (The Song of Bernadette, Since You Went Away, Love Letters, Duel in the Sun, The Towering Inferno)
- Adam Kantor, Broadway actor, singer, dancer, Rent
- Peter Kapetan (B.A. 1978), Broadway actor, singer, dancer (1956–2008)
- Spencer Kayden (B.S. 1990), former cast member of MADTv; Tony Award nominee for Urinetown
- James Keach (B.S. 1970), actor (The Long Riders); producer (Walk the Line); director (Dr. Quinn, Medicine Woman)
- Stacy Keach, Sr. (B.S. 1935), actor (Get Smart); director (Tales of the Texas Rangers)
- Clinton Kelly (M.S. 1993), co-host of What Not to Wear
- Richard Kind (B.S. 1978), actor (Mad About You, Spin City)
- Laura Kissel (M.F.A. 1999), filmmaker
- Richard Kline (M.A. 1967), actor (Three's Company)
- Robert Knepper (attended, never graduated), actor (Prison Break, Hostage, Carnivàle)
- Gary Kroeger (B.S. 1981), former cast member of Saturday Night Live
- Roger Kumble (B.S. 1988), writer/director (Cruel Intentions)
- Clyde Kusatsu (B.S. 1970), actor (All American Girl, In the Line of Fire)
- Mark Lamos (B.S. 1969), Tony Award-winning former artistic director of the Hartford Stage
- Sherry Lansing (B.S. 1966), former CEO of Paramount Pictures; Academy Award-nominated producer (Fatal Attraction); 2007 recipient of The Jean Hersholt Humanitarian Award
- Britt Leach, actor (Weird Science)
- Cloris Leachman (B.S. 1948), Academy Award-winning and Emmy Award-winning actress (The Last Picture Show, The Mary Tyler Moore Show, Spanglish)
- Greta Lee (B.S. 2005), actress (Past Lives, Russian Doll, The Morning Show)
- Katrina Lenk (B.M. 1997), actress and musician, recipient of 2018 Tony Award for Best Actress in a Musical for The Band's Visit
- Harry J. Lennix (B.S. 1986), actor (The Matrix Reloaded, The Matrix Revolutions, Commander in Chief, Ray)
- Herschell Gordon Lewis, filmmaker
- Richard J. Lewis (B.A. 1982), Emmy Award-nominated director/producer (CSI: Crime Scene Investigation)
- Laura Linney (attended for a year, then transferred), actress (The Truman Show, Love Actually)
- John Logan (B.S. 1983), Academy Award-nominated screenwriter (The Aviator, Gladiator, The Last Samurai, Hugo, Skyfall)
- Shelley Long (class of 1971, never graduated), Emmy Award-winning actress (Cheers, The Money Pit, Irreconcilable Differences)
- Julia Louis-Dreyfus (class of 1982, never graduated), Emmy Award-winning actress (Seinfeld, The New Adventures of Old Christine, Veep); former cast member of Saturday Night Live
- Britt Lower (B.S. 2008), Emmy Award-winning actress (Severence)
- Paul Lynde (B.S. 1948), actor (Hollywood Squares, Bewitched, Bye Bye Birdie)
- J. P. Manoux (B.S. 1991), actor (ER, Phil of the Future, The Emperor's New School)
- Stephanie March (B.S. 1996), actress (Law & Order: SVU, Conviction)
- Meredith Marks (J.D., M.M. 1997) TV personality (The Real Housewives of Salt Lake City)
- Garry Marshall (B.S. 1956), creator of Happy Days, Laverne and Shirley, and Mork & Mindy; director (Pretty Woman, Beaches, The Princess Diaries)
- Marshall W. Mason (B.S. 1961), Tony Award-nominated director (Fifth of July, As Is)
- Jacquelyn Mayer (B.S. 1964), former Miss America
- Ralph Meeker (B.S. 1943), actor (Kiss Me Deadly, Paths of Glory, Picnic, The St. Valentine's Day Massacre, The Anderson Tapes)
- Lío Mehiel (B.S. 2015), actor (After the Hunt, Mutt)
- Susan Messing (B.S. 1986), performer, teacher, and director at The Second City, ImprovOlympic, and the Annoyance Theatre
- Josh Meyers (B.S. 1998), actor (MADtv, That '70s Show)
- Seth Meyers (B.S. 1996), cast member of Saturday Night Live; host of Late Night with Seth Meyers; winner of the third Celebrity Poker Showdown
- Terri Minsky (B.S. 1980), creator, writer, executive producer of Lizzie McGuire, Less Than Perfect, The Geena Davis Show
- John Cameron Mitchell (B.S. 1985), writer/actor/director (Hedwig and the Angry Inch), executive producer (Tarnation)
- Karen Moncrieff (B.S. 1986), Miss Illinois 1985; writer and director of The Dead Girl and Blue Car
- Jason Moore (B.S. 1993), Tony Award-nominated director (Avenue Q)
- Andrew Moskos (B.A. 1990), co-founder of Boom Chicago in Amsterdam
- Megan Mullally (class of 1981, never graduated), Emmy Award-winning actress (Will and Grace)
- Dermot Mulroney (B.S. 1985), actor (About Schmidt, My Best Friend's Wedding, The Family Stone)
- Tony Musante, actor (Toma, As the World Turns)
- John Musker (B.A. 1975), writer/producer/director (The Little Mermaid, Aladdin, Hercules)
- Margaret Nagle, screenwriter (Emmy Award-winning Warm Springs)
- Patricia Neal (B.S. 1947), Academy Award-winning and Tony Award-winning actress (A Face in the Crowd, Hud, Breakfast at Tiffany's, The Subject Was Roses)
- Tom Neal, actor (Detour, Jungle Girl)
- George Newbern (B.S. 1986), actor (Father of the Bride, Father of the Bride Part II, Justice League Unlimited)
- Jamie Ray Newman (B.S. 2000), actress (Veronica Mars, Stargate Atlantis)
- Nigel Ng (2014), stand-up comedian based in London known for the character "Uncle Roger"
- Agnes Nixon (B.S. 1944), Emmy Award-winning writer/producer (All My Children, One Life to Live, Another World, As the World Turns, Loving)
- Bill Nuss (B.S. 1976), writer, producer, showrunner (The A-Team, 21 Jump Street, Hunter, Pacific Blue, NCIS, Hawaii 5-0)
- Denis O'Hare (B.S. 1984), Tony Award-winning actor (Take Me Out, Sweet Charity, Assassins)
- Dana Olsen (B.S. 1980), screenwriter (George of the Jungle, The 'Burbs)
- James Olson (B.S. 1952), actor (Rachel, Rachel, The Andromeda Strain, Ragtime, Commando)
- Jerry Orbach (class of 1956, never graduated), Tony Award-winning and Emmy Award-nominated actor (Law & Order, Promises, Promises, Dirty Dancing)
- Maulik Pancholy (B.S. 1995), actor (30 Rock, Weeds)
- Mary Beth Peil (B.S. 1962), Tony Award-nominated actress (The King and I, Dawson's Creek, The Good Wife)
- Jeff Pinkner, screenwriter (Lost)
- Kim Poster, Broadway theatre producer
- Marty Pottenger, OBIE-award-winning playwright, performer, civic engagement artist, founder of Art At Work
- Jenny Powers (B.S. 2003), Miss Illinois 2000; Broadway actress (Little Women)
- Paula Prentiss (B.S. 1959), Emmy Award-nominated actress (Where the Boys Are, The Parallax View, In Harm's Way, The World of Henry Orient)
- Michael Prywes (B.S. 1996), writer and director of Returning Mickey Stern
- John Qualen, actor (The Grapes of Wrath, The Searchers, Casablanca, The High and the Mighty)
- Maeve Quinlan (attended, transferred to University of Southern California), actress (90210, South of Nowhere, Ken Park, The Bold and the Beautiful)
- Lily Rabe (B.S. 2004), actress (No Reservations, Steel Magnolias)
- Charlotte Rae (B.S. 1948), Emmy Award-nominated and Tony Award-nominated actress (The Facts of Life, Diff'rent Strokes, Queen of the Stardust Ballroom)
- Robert O. Ragland (B.S. 1953), film score composer, arranger and orchestrator
- Tony Randall (class of 1941, never graduated), Emmy Award-winning and Tony Award-nominated actor (The Odd Couple, Mister Peepers, Inherit the Wind)
- Keith Reddin (B.S. 1978), playwright
- Robert Reed (B.S. 1954), Emmy Award-nominated actor (The Brady Bunch, The Boy in the Plastic Bubble, Roots)
- Daphne Maxwell Reid (B.A. 1970), actress (The Fresh Prince of Bel-Air)
- Ruth Roberts, composer
- Tony Roberts (B.S. 1961), Tony Award-nominated actor (Annie Hall, Serpico, Play It Again, Sam)
- Marcia Rodd (B.S. 1960), Tony Award-nominated actress (Little Murders)
- Jeri Ryan (B.S. 1991), actress (Boston Public, Star Trek: Voyager, Shark)
- Ethan Sandler (B.S. 1995), actor (Crossing Jordan)
- Debra Sandlund, actress
- Kristen Schaal (B.S. 2001), actress and comedian, contributor to The Daily Show
- David Schwimmer (B.S. 1988), Emmy Award-nominated actor (Friends, Band of Brothers, Madagascar)
- Kathryn Leigh Scott, actress
- Sarah Sherman (SoC 2015), comedian, cast member of Saturday Night Live
- Yuki Shimoda (Yukio Shimoda, B.A. in Accounting 1950s), Emmy Award-nominated actor
- Katherine Shindle (B.S. 1999), Miss America 1998, actress (Capote)
- Dan Shor, actor (Tron, Strange Behavior, Bill & Ted's Excellent Adventure)
- Peter Spears (B.A. 1988), Academy Award-winning film producer and actor (Nomadland, Call Me By Your Name)
- Jerry Springer (J.D. 1968), host of Jerry Springer; former mayor of Cincinnati
- Marina Squerciati (B.A. 2003), actress Chicago P.D.
- Florence Stanley, actress (My Two Dads, Atlantis: The Lost Empire)
- McLean Stevenson (B.S. 1952), Emmy Award-nominated actor (M*A*S*H, The Doris Day Show); guest host of The Tonight Show Starring Johnny Carson
- Peter Strauss (B.S. 1969), Emmy Award-winning actor (Rich Man, Poor Man, Masada, Soldier Blue, The Secret of NIMH)
- Nicole Sullivan (B.S. 1991), original cast member of MADtv; actress (The King of Queens); winner of the inaugural Celebrity Poker Showdown
- Hope Summers, actress (The Andy Griffith Show)
- Inga Swenson (B.S. 1953), actress (The Miracle Worker, Benson)
- Robin Lord Taylor (B.S. 2000), actor (Gotham)
- Leigh Taylor-Young (attended, never graduated), Emmy Award-winning actress (Soylent Green, Picket Fences, I Love You, Alice B. Toklas)
- Lloyd Thaxton (B.A. 1950), television show host, Emmy Award-winning producer of Fight Back! With David Horowitz
- Robin Thede (B.A. 2002), BET Award-winning creator, writer, and actor of A Black Lady Sketch Show; former host of The Rundown with Robin Thede
- David Thompson (B.S.J.), playwright and writer (The Scottsboro Boys, Steel Pier)
- Chuti Tiu (B.A. 1991), Miss Illinois 1994; actress (Desire)
- Deborah Tranelli (B.S. 1977), actress (Dallas)
- Robert Trebor, actor (Hercules: The Legendary Journeys, Raise Your Voice)
- Eva Victor (B.S. 2016), actor and filmmaker (Sorry, Baby)
- Tom Virtue (B.S. 1979), actor (Even Stevens, Read It and Weep)
- Jennifer von Mayrhauser (B.S. 1970), costume designer of films (The Hand that Rocks the Cradle), television (Law & Order) and theatre (Talley's Folly)
- Billie Lou Watt (B.S. 1945), actress (Search for Tomorrow, Astro Boy)
- Michael Weston (B.S.), actor (The Last Kiss, Coyote Ugly, Six Feet Under)
- Kimberly Williams (B.S. 1993), actress (Father of the Bride, Father of the Bride Part II, According to Jim)
- Pharrell Williams (attended, never graduated), Creative Director of Louis Vuitton (men's wear), Grammy-winning musician/producer
- Fred Williamson (B.S. 1960), actor (M*A*S*H, Three the Hard Way, Black Caesar, Starsky & Hutch); former professional defensive back who played in Super Bowl I
- Ed Wood, filmmaker
- Natalie Wynn, YouTuber, video essayist
- Mary Zimmerman (B.S. 1982, M.A. 1985, Ph.D. 1994), Tony Award-winning director/writer (Metamorphoses); librettist (Galileo Galilei)

== Business ==
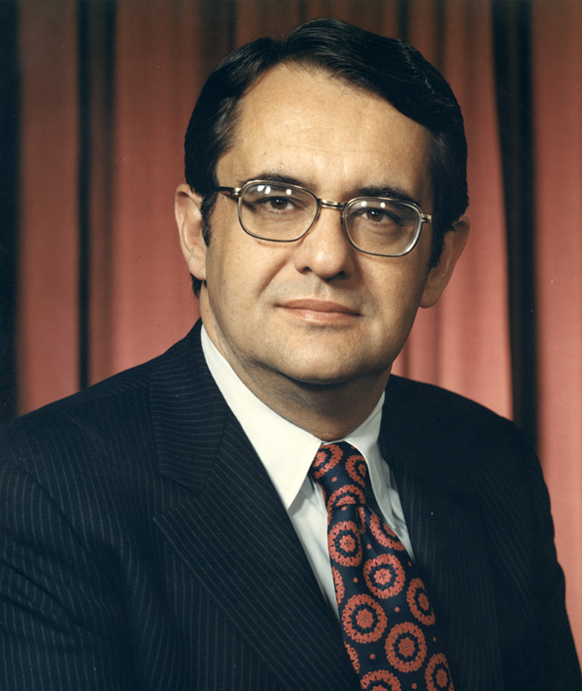
Peter George Peterson

- James L. Allen (B.S. 1929), founder of Booz Allen Hamilton
- Arthur E. Andersen (B.B.A. 1917), founder of Arthur Andersen LLP
- Edwin G. Booz (B.S. 1914), founder of Booz Allen Hamilton
- Bonnie Brennan (B.A. 1995), CEO of Christie's
- Arthur Bronwell (M.B.A. 1947), president of Worcester Polytechnic Institute
- Lisa Caputo (M.S. 1987), chairman and CEO, Citigroup Women and Company
- Sue Castorino (B.S. 1975), founder and president of the Speaking Specialists
- Nicholas Chabraja (B.A. 1964), chairman and CEO, General Dynamics
- Dennis Chookaszian (B.S. 1965), chairman and CEO, CNA Insurance
- Douglas Conant (B.A. 1973, MBA 1975), president and CEO, Campbell's
- Bill Cook (B.S. 1953), billionaire founder and owner of the Cook Group
- Joshua DeAngelis (B.A. 2017), founder and president of Palette Media
- D. Cameron Findlay (B.A. 1982), senior vice president and general counsel, Archer Daniels Midland Co.
- Scott J. Freidheim (B.A. 1987, MBA 1991), president and CEO, CDI Corp
- Christopher Galvin (B.A. 1973), former chairman and CEO of Motorola
- Elbert Henry Gary (J.D. 1868), co-founder of the United States Steel Corporation
- Hugh Hefner (attended for semester of graduate sociology courses), founder of Playboy Enterprises, Inc.
- Ben Huh (B.A. 1999), internet entrepreneur and CEO of the Cheezburger Network
- David Ing (M.B.A. 1982), marketing scientist and senior consultant
- John H. Johnson (attended, never graduated), founder of the Johnson Publishing Company (Ebony and Jet magazines)
- David Kabiller (M.B.A.), founder of AQR Capital Management
- Louis S. Kahnweiler (B.A. 1941), real estate developer
- Andrew Mason (B.Mus. 2003), founder and CEO, Groupon
- Renetta McCann (B.S. 1978, M.S. 2009), advertising executive
- Blythe McGarvie, director of Accenture, Viacom, and the Pepsi Bottling Group
- John Meriwether (B.S. 1969), founder of Long-Term Capital Management
- Judi Sheppard Missett, founder and long-time CEO, Jazzercise
- Roshni Nadar (B.A., M.B.A.), chairperson of HCL Technologies, executive director and CEO of HCL Corporations, trustee of Shiv Nadar Foundation
- Divya Narendra (J.D./M.B.A. 2012), co-founder of ConnectU
- William A. Osborn (B.A. 1969), chairman and CEO, Northern Trust Corporation
- Peter George Peterson (B.S. 1947), former chairman and CEO of Lehman Brothers; co-founder of the Blackstone Group
- Tom Poberezny (B.S. 1970), former chairman and president of Experimental Aircraft Association
- Christine Poon (B.A. 1973), vice chairman and worldwide chairman of Medicines & Nutritionals, Johnson & Johnson
- Jay Pritzker, co-founder of Hyatt; member of the Pritzker family
- Leonid Radvinsky (B.S. 2002), serial entrepreneur and majority owner of OnlyFans
- Ginni Rometty (B.S. 1979), chairman, president and chief executive officer, IBM
- Pat Ryan (B.A. 1959), founder and executive chairman of Aon Corporation
- Paul Sagan (B.S. 1981), president and CEO, Akamai Technologies
- Faiza Seth (B.A. 2000), CEO of Casa Forma, Ltd.
- Gwynne Shotwell (B.S. 1986, M.S. 1988), president and COO of SpaceX
- William Shu (B.A. 2001), CEO/co-founder of Deliveroo
- Alfred Steele (B.A. 1923), former CEO of Pepsi-Cola
- Lee Styslinger III (B.A. 1983), chairman and CEO of Altec, Inc.
- Howard A. Tullman (B.A. 1967), serial entrepreneur, venture capitalist
- Mary T. Washington, first African-American female certified public accountant in U.S.
- Robert Wayman (B.S. 1967), former CFO and EVP, Hewlett-Packard

For notable M.B.A. alumni, also see the Kellogg School of Management.

== Journalism ==
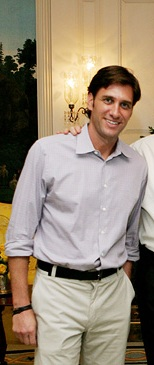
Mike Greenberg

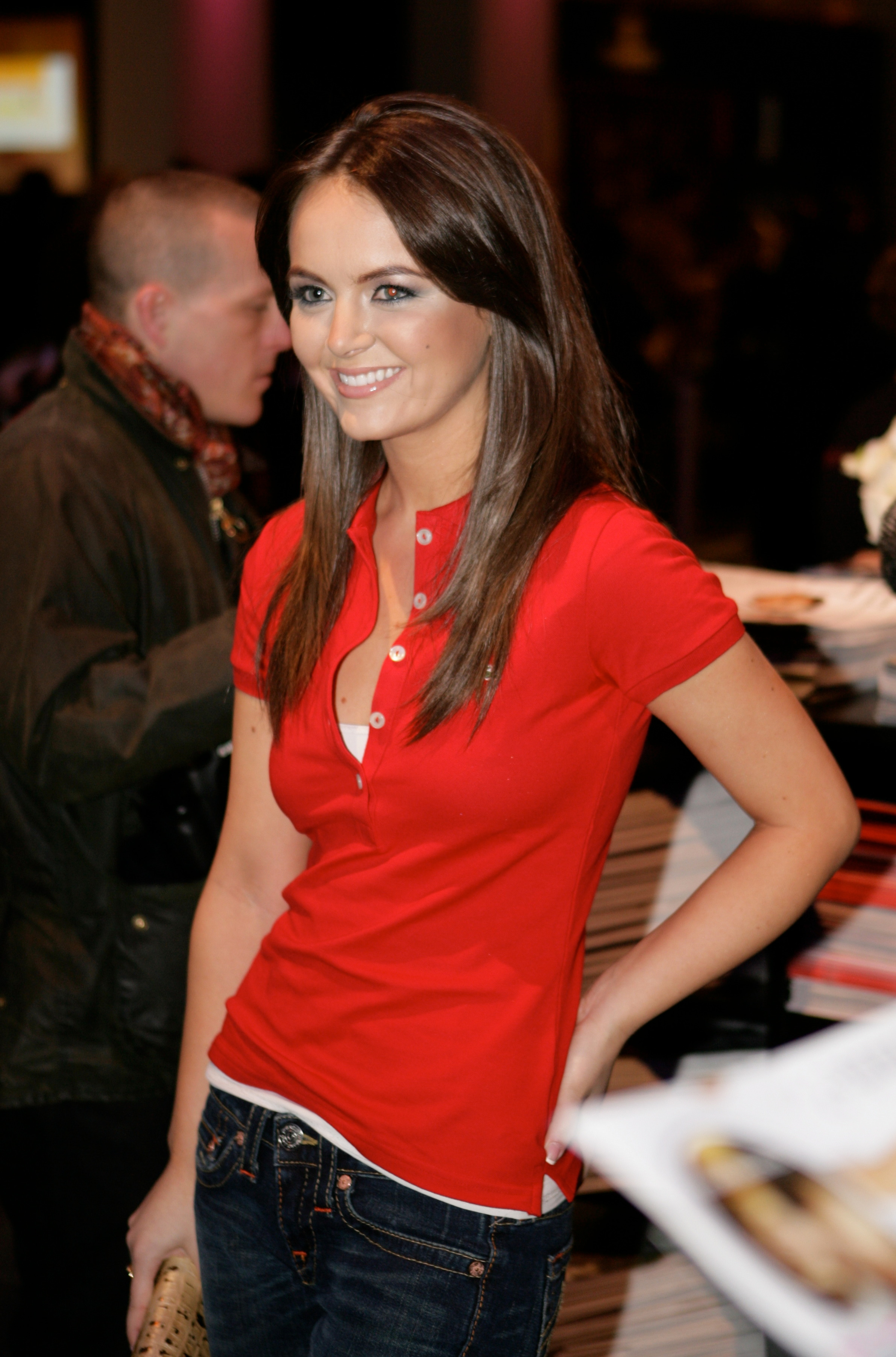
Nicole Lapin

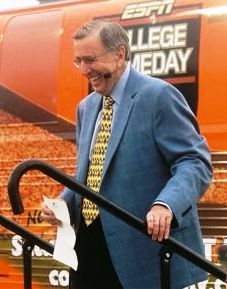
Brent Musburger

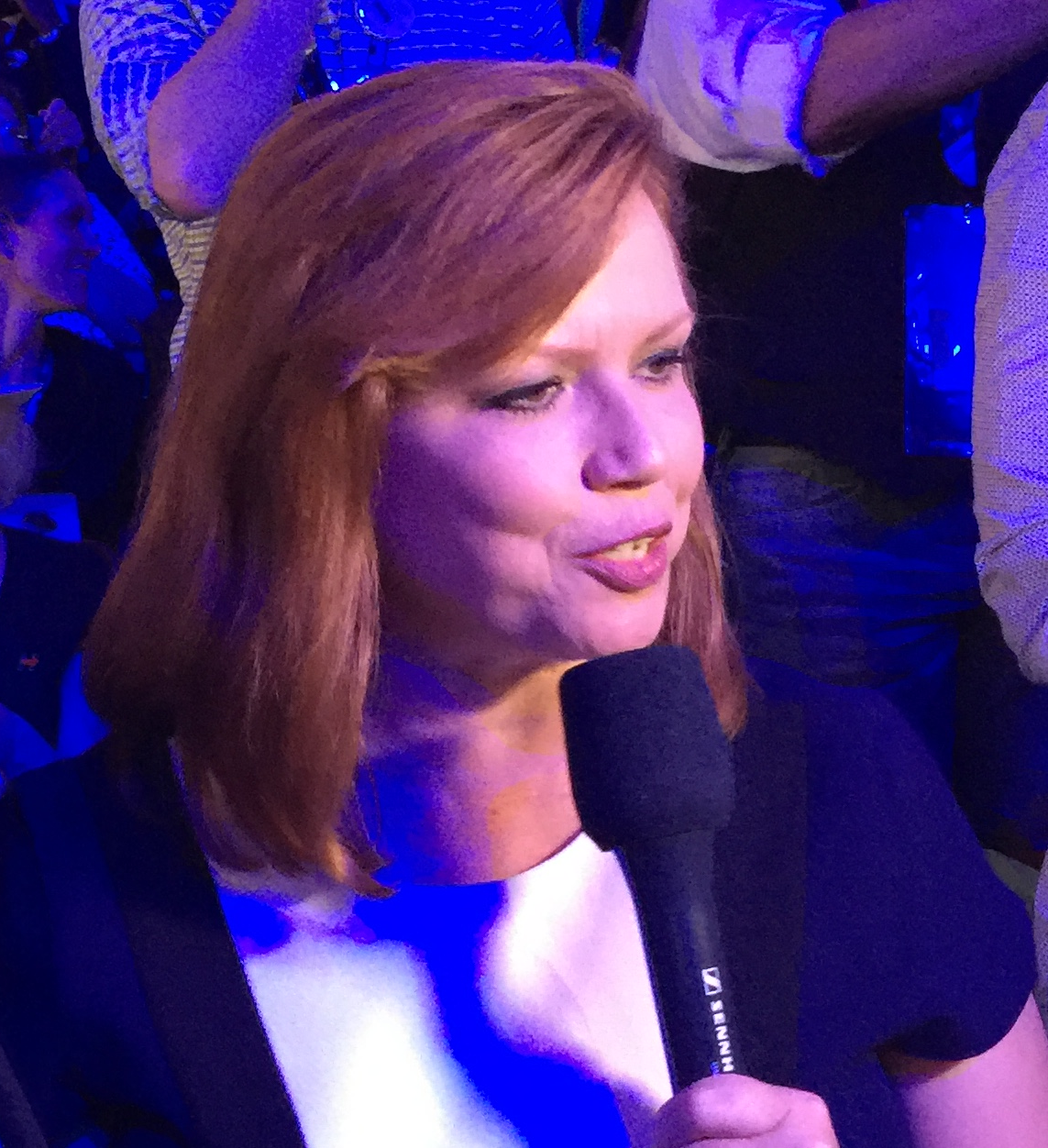
Kelly O'Donnell

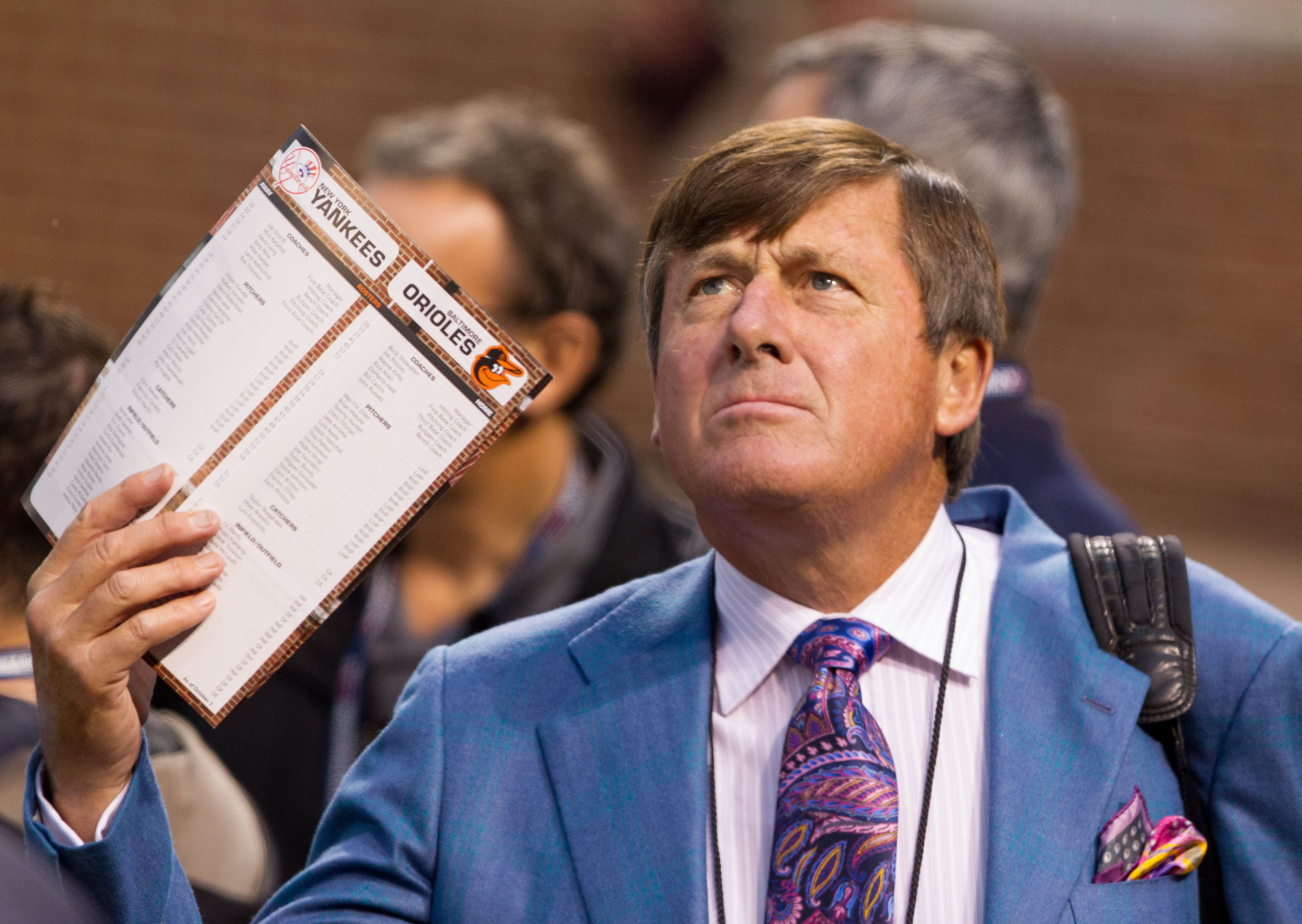
Craig Sager

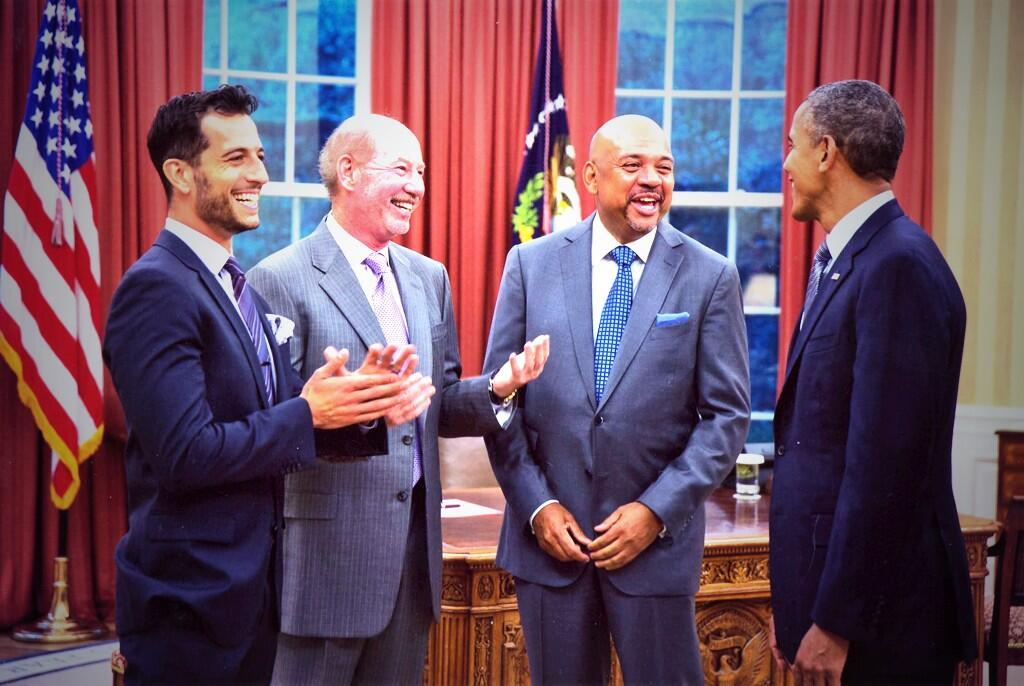
Michael Wilbon

- J. A. Adande, director of sports journalism at Northwestern University; former ESPN contributor, Around the Horn; former Los Angeles Times sports columnist
- Peter Alexander, national correspondent, NBC News
- Peter Applebome (M.S. 1974), reporter, The New York Times
- Jabari Asim, columnist, The Washington Post
- David Barstow (B.S. 1986), Pulitzer Prize-winning reporter, The New York Times
- Melissa Bell (M.S. 2006), co-founder of Vox Media; CEO of Chicago Public Media
- Steve Bell (M.S. 1963), former correspondent for ABC News
- Amalie Benjamin, sports columnist, The Boston Globe
- Guy Benson (B.S. 2007), author, columnist, pundit, political editor of Townhall.com
- Ira Berkow (M.S. 1964), author, former sports columnist, The New York Times
- Kai Bird (M.S. 1975), Pulitzer Prize-winning author and columnist
- Kevin Blackistone (B.S. 1981), ESPN contributor, Around the Horn; former Dallas Morning News sports columnist
- Valerie Boyd (B.S. 1985), author of Wrapped in Rainbows: The Life of Zora Neale Hurston; former Atlanta Journal-Constitution arts editor
- Christine Brennan (B.S. 1980, M.S. 1981), sports columnist, USA Today
- Elisabeth Bumiller, former White House Correspondent, The New York Times
- Steve Burton, television sports reporter for WBZ-TV and WSBK-TV in Boston
- Lisa Byington, play-by-play announcer for Milwaukee Bucks
- Benedict Carey (M.S. 1985), science reporter, The New York Times
- Lauren Chooljian (M.S. 2011), radio journalist for New Hampshire Public Radio
- Cindy Chupack, screenwriter and director who won three Golden Globe and two Emmys for her work in TV on Sex and the City
- Amanda Congdon (B.S. 2003), former hostess of Rocketboom
- Mort Crim (M.S. 1963), former correspondent for ABC News and author
- Richard Cross (B.S. 1972), freelance photojournalist and visual anthropologist
- Benoit Denizet-Lewis (B.S. 1997), contributor to The New York Times Magazine and author of America Anonymous
- Richard Durham, creator of the radio series Destination Freedom
- Gregg Easterbrook (M.S.J.), author and journalist, senior editor of The New Republic
- Jonathan Eig (B.S.J. 1986), journalist, author of Ali: A Life
- Rich Eisen (M.S.J. 1994), NFL Network anchor
- Helene Elliott, sports columnist, Los Angeles Times
- Linda Foley (B.S. 1977), president of The Newspaper Guild
- John Fricke, Emmy Award-winning author/historian; expert on Judy Garland and The Wizard of Oz
- Georgie Anne Geyer, journalist
- Ira Glass, host of NPR's This American Life (attended Northwestern, transferred out)
- Susan Goldberg, editor-in-chief, National Geographic Magazine
- Patrick Goldstein (B.A. 1975, M.A. 1976), former columnist and reporter, Los Angeles Times
- Joshua Green (M.S.J.), senior editor, The Atlantic
- Lauren Green, religion correspondent for Fox News Channel
- Mike Greenberg, ESPN Sportscenter anchor, co-host of Mike & Mike on ESPN Radio, co-host of Get Up!
- John Heilemann (B.S.J. 1987), journalist at New York magazine and co-author of Game Change: Obama and the Clintons, McCain and Palin, and the Race of a Lifetime
- Jon Heyman, baseball writer, Sports Illustrated
- Cassidy Hubbarth, ESPN anchor
- Stephen Hunter, Pulitzer Prize-winning film critic for The Washington Post and novelist
- Michael Isikoff, former investigative journalist for Newsweek magazine and NBC News
- David Israel, former columnist, Washington Star, Chicago Tribune, Los Angeles Herald Examiner; former sportswriter, Chicago Daily News
- Laura Jacobs (B.A. 1978), contributing editor at Vanity Fair and New Criterion dance critic
- Ryan Jacobs, deputy editor, Pacific Standard magazine and author of The Truffle Underground
- Jeff Jarvis, creator of Entertainment Weekly, columnist, professor at CUNY Journalism program
- Clara Jeffery, editor-in-chief, Mother Jones magazine
- Omar Jimenez, journalist and correspondent working for CNN
- Maura Johnston (B.S. 1997), editor and critic
- Sheinelle Jones, anchor, NBC News
- Sherry Jones (M.S. 1971), senior producer, Frontline
- Dorothy Misener Jurney, known as "the godmother of women's pages"
- Walter Kerr, Broadway theater critic, playwright, and author
- Hank Klibanoff (M.S.J. 1973), former managing editor of The Atlanta Journal-Constitution and Pulitzer Prize-winning co-author of The Race Beat: The Press, the Civil Rights Struggle, and the Awakening of a Nation
- Rikki Klieman, Court TV anchor and legal analyst
- Michelle Kosinski, correspondent, NBC News
- Irv Kupcinet, former Chicago Sun-Times columnist
- Katherine Lanpher (B.S.J.), writer and radio personality, author of Leap Days
- Nicole Lapin (B.S.J. 2005), anchor, CNN Pipeline
- Juliet Litman, journalist and media personality at The Ringer
- Jonathan Mahler (B.A. 1990), journalist, author of Gods of New York and Ladies and Gentlemen, the Bronx Is Burning
- Stewart Mandel, college football writer, Sports Illustrated
- Robert R. McCormick, former owner of the Chicago Tribune
- Ayelish McGarvey, journalist
- Matt Medved, editor-in-chief, Spin
- Brent Musburger, sportscaster, ABC
- Nyo Mya (M.S. 1943), author and journalist from Burma
- Rachel Nichols, ESPN and Washington Post reporter
- Keith O’Brien (B.A. 1995), journalist and author, Fly Girls and Charlie Hustle
- Kelly O'Donnell (B.A. 1987), White House correspondent for NBC News
- John Palmer, former news correspondent for NBC News
- Ben Parr (B.A. 2008), CNET columnist and former co-editor of Mashable
- Kevin Peraino (B.S.J. 1998), journalist and author of Lincoln in the World: The Making of a Statesman and the Dawn of American Power
- Barry Petersen, foreign correspondent, CBS News
- Patricia Peterson (B.A. 1948), fashion editor The New York Times (1957–1977)
- Daniel H. Pink (B.A. 1986), author
- Neal Pollack, novelist, essayist
- Seth Porges, technology writer, television commentator, and Popular Mechanics editor
- Steven Reddicliffe (B.S. 1975), former editor-in-chief, TV Guide; current television editor for The New York Times
- Nick Reding (B.A. 1994), author, Methland
- Kathy Reichs, best-selling novelist and forensic anthropologist
- Jacque Reid, television and radio personality, former lead anchor for the BET nightly news
- Dave Revsine, sportscaster for Big Ten Network, formerly with ESPN
- James Risen (M.S. 1978), Pulitzer Prize-winning reporter for The New York Times
- Adam Rittenberg, ESPN Big Ten blogger
- James Rosen, Washington, D.C. correspondent for Fox News Channel
- Tina Rosenberg (B.A. 1981, M.S.J.), author and journalist at The New York Times Magazine
- Brian M. Rosenthal (B.A. 2011), investigative reporter at The New York Times
- Darren Rovell, CNBC sports business reporter
- Daniel Rubin, metro columnist, The Philadelphia Inquirer
- Craig Sager, sportscaster
- Steve Scully (Master of Science), host, political editor, and senior producer of C-SPAN's Washington Journal
- Anatole Shub, journalist for The Washington Post and The New York Times, author
- David Sirota, author of Hostile Takeover and political strategist
- Jane Skinner, former host of Fox News Live
- Evan Smith, editor in chief of Texas Monthly
- Dan Stoneking, sports editor of the Minneapolis Star and president of the Professional Hockey Writers' Association
- Lynn Sweet, Washington, D.C., bureau chief and columnist, Chicago Sun-Times
- Rick Telander, sportswriter, Chicago Sun Times
- Dina Temple-Raston (B.A. 1986), journalist, author, and National Public Radio correspondent
- Derek Thompson (B.A. 2008), journalist, co-author with Ezra Klein of "Abundance"
- Sander Vanocur, journalist
- David Weigel, political reporter, Slate magazine
- Alan Weisman (B.A., M.A.), journalist and author of The World Without Us
- Gary Weiss, journalist
- Michael Wilbon, ESPN analyst (Pardon the Interruption, NBA Countdown) and Washington Post sports columnist

== Law ==
See also Northwestern University School of Law

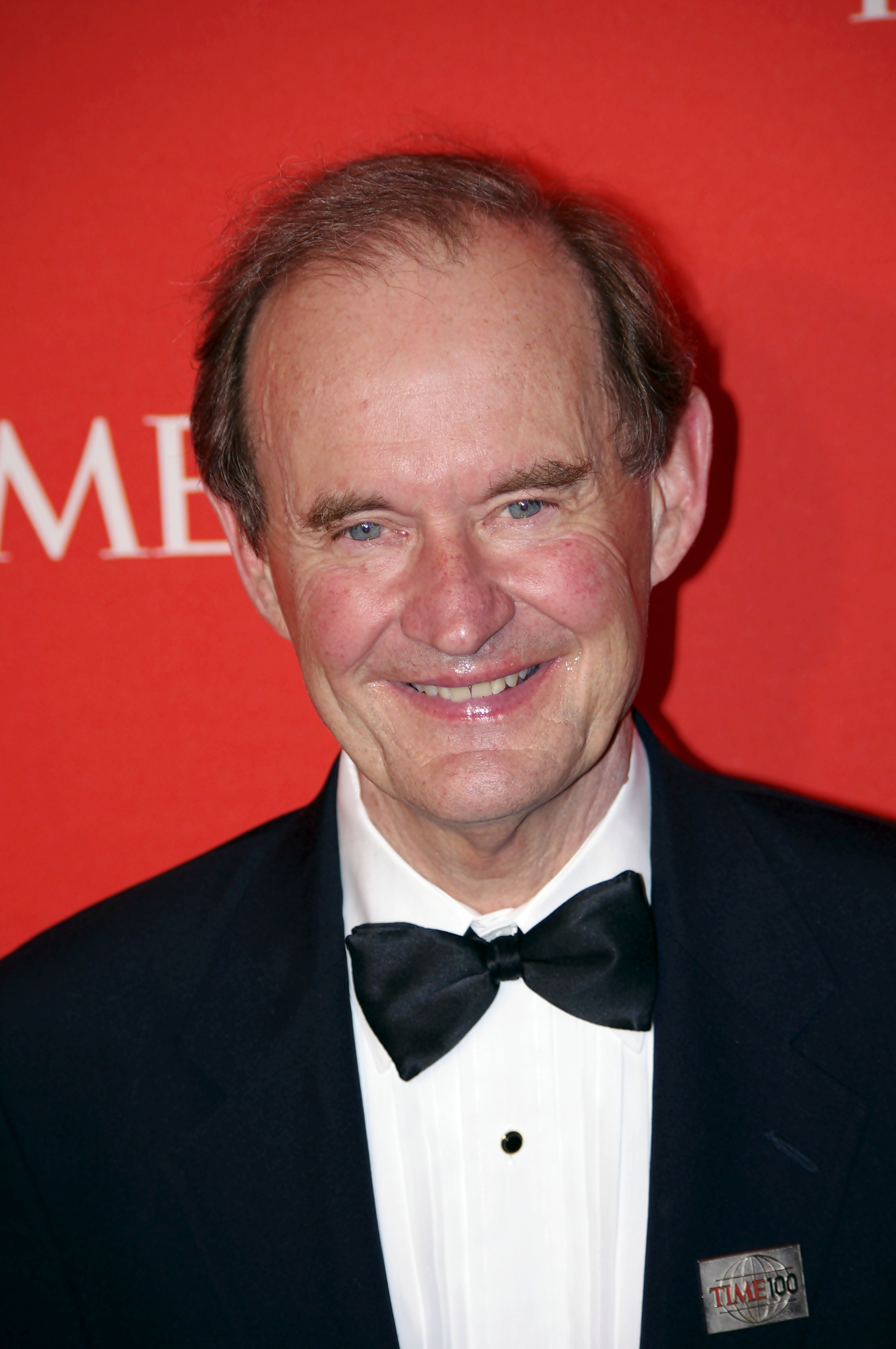
David Boies

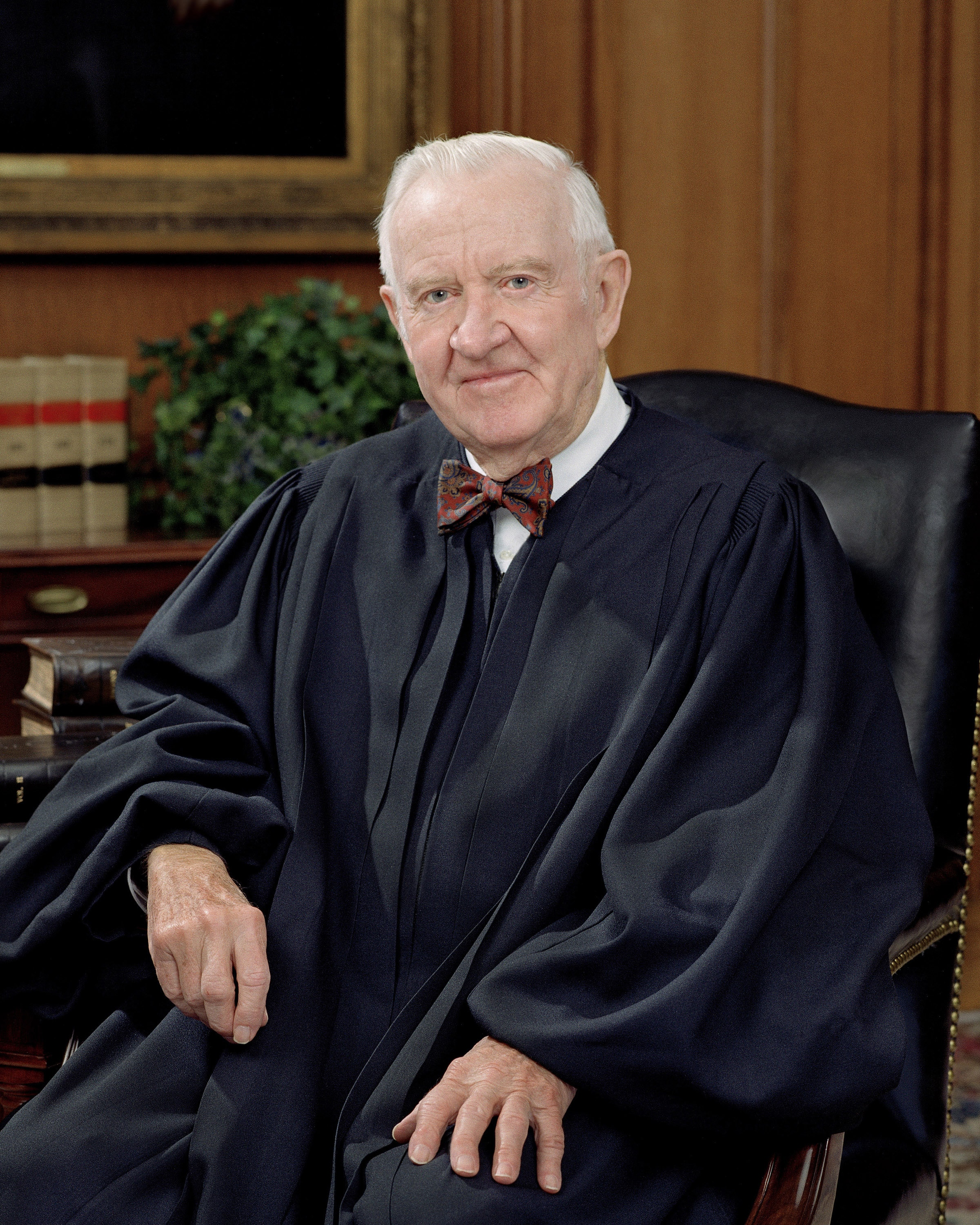
John Paul Stevens

- Simeon R. Acoba, Jr. (J.D. 1997), justice, Hawaii Supreme Court
- Gregory S. Alexander (J.D. 2008), A. Robert Noll Professor of Law, Cornell Law School
- Diane Marie Amann (J.D. 1996), associate dean for international programs & strategic initiatives and Emily & Ernest Woodruff Chair in International Law, University of Georgia School of Law
- Rachel E. Barkow (B.A. 1993), professor of law, New York University Law School
- Randy Barnett (B.A. 1974), Carmack Waterhouse Professor of Law, Georgetown University
- Henry Moore Bates (LL.B.), dean of the University of Michigan Law School and fellow of the American Academy of Arts and Sciences
- Richard Ben-Veniste (L.L.M.), 9/11 Commission member
- Duane Benton (B.A. 1972), federal judge, United States Court of Appeals for the Eighth Circuit
- Raoul Berger (J.D. 1999), former Charles Warren Senior Fellow in American Legal History, Harvard Law School
- Mary Frances Berry, Geraldine R. Segal Professor of American Social Thought and Professor of History at the University of Pennsylvania; civil rights commissioner, 1980–2004
- Dalveer Bhandari (L.L.M. 1999), former judge, Supreme Court of India, presently a judge at the International Court of Justice, Hague
- Brian Blanchard, judge of the Wisconsin Court of Appeals
- David Boies (B.S. 1964), counsel, Bush v. Gore; founding partner, Boies, Schiller & Flexner
- Erwin Chemerinsky (B.S. 1975), dean, University of California, Berkeley School of Law
- G. Marcus Cole (J.D. 2007), professor of law, Helen L. Crocker Faculty Scholar, and associate dean for curriculum, Stanford Law School
- Cyrus E. Dietz (J.D. 2006), justice, Illinois Supreme Court
- Carl E. Douglas (B.A. 2007), lawyer
- James Emmert (1920), Indiana attorney general and justice of the Indiana Supreme Court
- Tappan Gregory (L.L.M 1912), president of the American Bar Association in 1947–48
- Arthur Goldberg (J.D. 1930), U.S. Supreme Court justice
- Douglas Kmiec (B.A. 1973), Caruso Family Chair and professor of constitutional law, Pepperdine University School of Law; U.S. ambassador to the Republic of Malta
- Roberto Antonio Lange (J.D. 1988), federal judge, District of South Dakota
- Lyman Ray Patterson, former Pope F. Brock Professor of Professional Responsibility, University of Georgia School of Law
- Nathaniel C. Sears, judge of the Illinois Appellate Court and Cook County Superior Court; 1897 Republican nominee for mayor of Chicago
- Seymour Simon (B.S. 2010), Illinois Supreme Court
- Loren Smith (B.A. 2000 J.D. 2010), federal judge, United States Court of Federal Claims
- Jerry Springer 1968 politician; host of Jerry Springer
- John Paul Stevens (J.D. 1947), justice, U.S. Supreme Court
- Richard Tallman, justice, United States Court of Appeals for the Ninth Circuit
- Jonathan Turley, J.B. and Maurice Shapiro Professor of Public Interest Law, The George Washington University Law School
- Ken Ziffren (B.A. 1962), prominent entertainment attorney, "film czar" for the city of Los Angeles

== Medicine, science, and technology ==
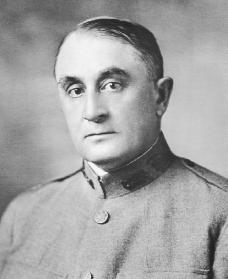
Charles Horace Mayo

- Pulickel Ajayan, professor of materials science and nanotechnology, Rice University
- David Applebaum, Israeli physician
- Deborah Asnis (B.S., M.D. 2008), infectious disease specialist, discovered and reported the first human cases of West Nile virus in the United States
- Cora Belle Brewster (1859–?), physician, surgeon, medical writer, editor
- Herman E. Brockman, geneticist and professor in the department of biological sciences at Illinois State University
- Robert A. Buethe, Surgeon General of the U.S. Air Force
- Kathryn Bullock, electrochemist
- Andy Carvin, founding editor and former coordinator of the Digital Divide Network
- George W. Crane (Ph.D., M.D.), psychologist, physician, author, newspaper columnist
- Robert F. Furchgott (Ph.D., 1940), physiology/medicine; Nobel Prize (1998)
- Larry Gladney (B.A., 1979), physicist and professor at Yale University
- Amy Gooch (Ph.D., 2006), computer scientist, developed Gooch shading
- Andrea Hodge (Ph.D. 2002), professor and department chair of materials science at University of Southern California
- Alston Scott Householder (B.A. 2007), mathematician
- Cheddi Jagan, dentist, former president of Guyana
- JacSue Kehoe (B.A. 1957), neuroscience researcher at the CNRS
- Marc Kirschner (B.A. 2007), founding chair of Department of Systems Biology, Harvard Medical School
- Kermit E. Krantz (B.S. 2007, M.S. 2008, M.D. 2012), professor, developed surgical techniques and invented expandable tampon
- Gary Kremen (B.A. 1985), internet entrepreneur, founder of Match.com; first investor in Dolores Labs
- Vida Latham (M.D. 1895), dentist, physician, and researcher
- Richard Lerner, past president of Scripps Research Institute, co-inventor of HUMIRA
- Irene D. Long, chief medical officer, Kennedy Space Center
- Boris Lushniak, Assistant Surgeon General of the United States
- Charles Horace Mayo, doctor (Mayo Clinic)
- Mary Alice McWhinnie, biologist, Antarctic researcher
- Ken A. Paller, cognitive neuroscientist working on memory and sleep
- Roswell Park (M.D. 1876), prominent surgeon for whom Roswell Park Comprehensive Cancer Center in Buffalo, New York, is named
- Joseph Edward Rall (M.D. 1945), endocrinologist and medical researcher
- Kathy Reichs (Ph.D.), forensic anthropologist, former chief medical examiner of North Carolina, author, professor
- Ida Hall Roby, first female graduate of Pharmaceutical Department of the Illinois College of Pharmacy, Northwestern University
- Sonya Rose (Ph.D. 2007), sociologist and historian
- Joan C. Sherman (B.S.), chemist and teacher
- Richard Skrenta (B.A. 1989), creator of the first computer virus, Elk Cloner
- Stephen Stahl (B.S. 1973, M.D. 1975), psychopharmacologist, author, professor
- Thomas Starzl (M.S. 2000, M.D. 2010), surgeon, father of modern transplantation, performed first liver transplant
- Joseph Staten, writer and director of the Halo video games
- Debi Thomas, orthopedic surgeon and 1988 Winter Olympics bronze medalist in figure skating
- Sam Treiman, former theoretical physicist and professor of physics at Princeton University
- Jacques Vallee (Ph.D. 1967), computer scientist, astronomer and UFO researcher
- Shannon Valley (B.A. 2007), climate scientist and policy advisor
- Edward Weiler (B.A. 2000, M.S. 2006, Ph.D. 2010), director, Goddard Space Flight Center
- John Harrison Wharton (M.S 1977), software engineer microprocessor designer

== Music, literature, and the arts ==
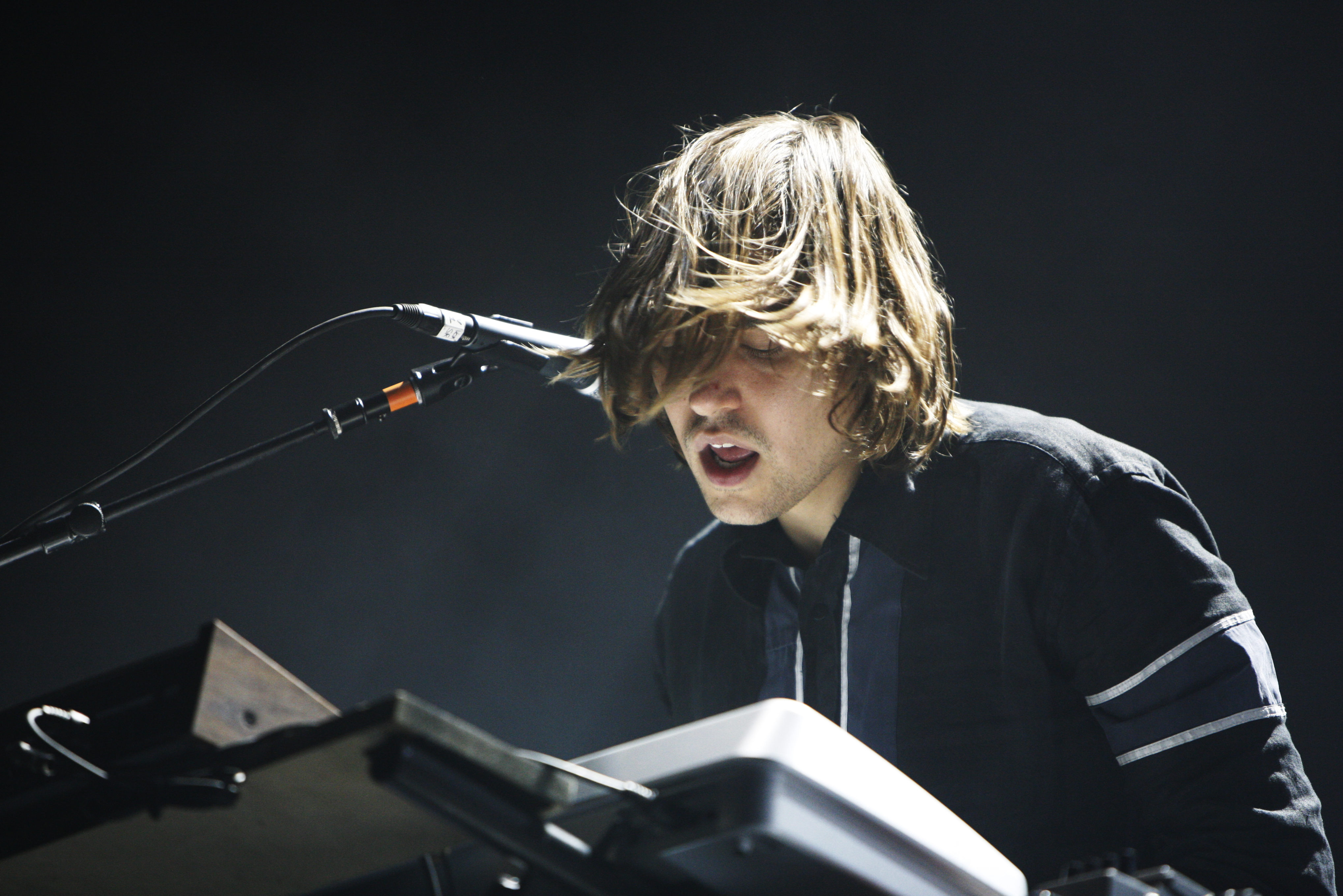
Will Butler

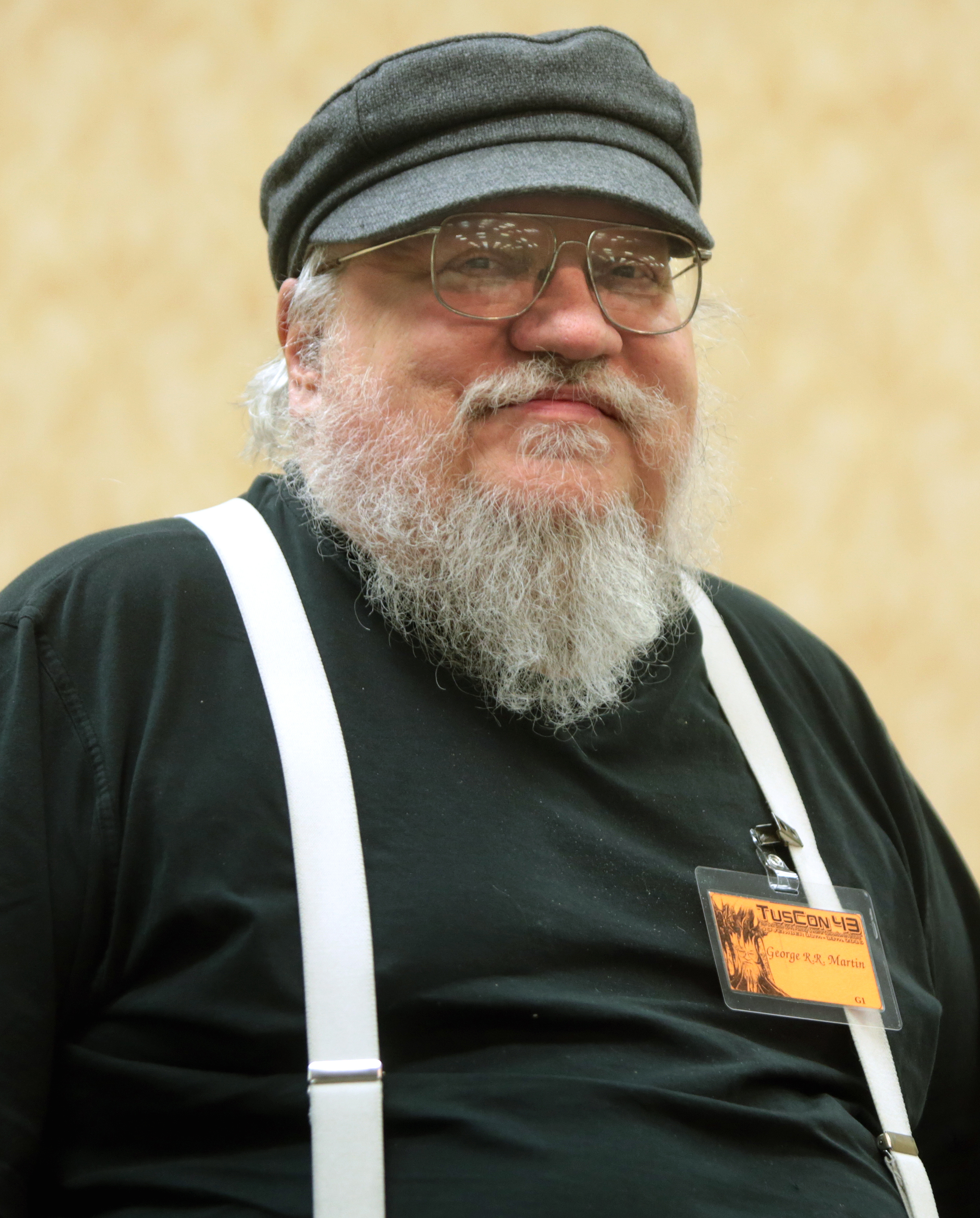
George R. R. Martin

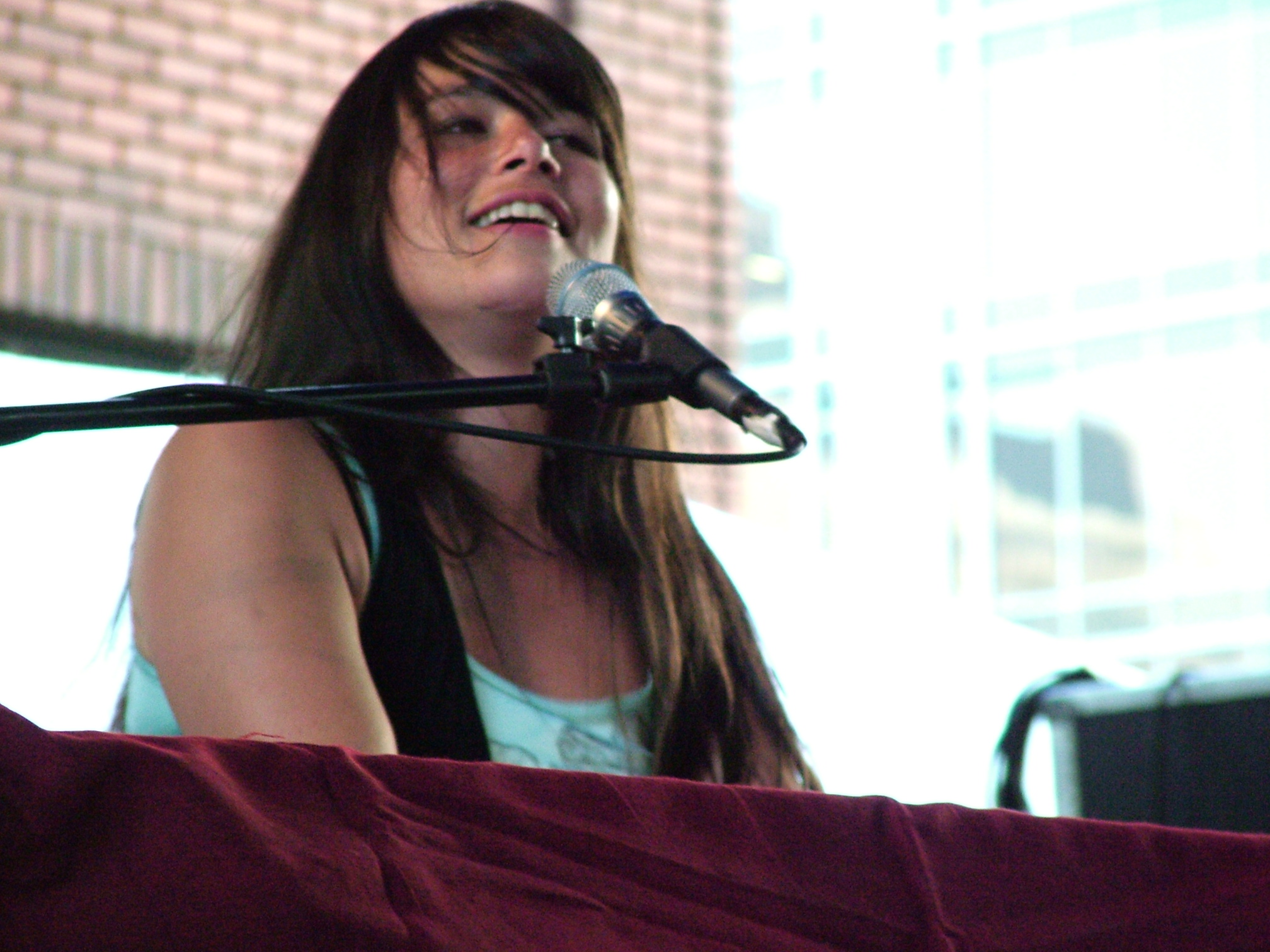
Rachael Yamagata

- Steve Albini, recording engineer, musician
- Jack Anderson, dance critic, The New York Times
- Marie Arana, editor of Washington Post Book World, author of National Book Award finalist American Chica and the novel Cellophane
- Steven Bach (B.A. 1961), former film executive and author of Final Cut and biographies including Leni: The Life and Work of Leni Riefenstahl
- Ernst Bacon, composer
- Mary Jo Bang (B.A., M.A.), 2007 National Book Critics Circle award winner for poetry collection Elegy, professor of English at Washington University in St. Louis
- Saul Bellow (B.A. 1937), Nobel Prize-winning novelist
- Andrew Bird (B.S. 1996), musician, songwriter, whistler
- Chris Bliss, juggler
- Anthony Bozza, music journalist, author of Whatever You Say I Am: The Life and Times of Eminem and Tommyland
- Grace Bumbry, Grammy-winning operatic mezzo-soprano
- Robert Olen Butler (B.S. 1967), Pulitzer Prize-winning novelist
- William Butler (B.A. 2005), member of indie rock band Arcade Fire
- Mark Camphouse, composer, notably of symphonic wind pieces, and conductor
- Dan Chaon, author
- Andrew Clements, author
- Julia Davids, founding member and artistic director of the Canadian Chamber Choir
- Robert Davine (B.A. and M.A. 195?), concert accordionist and founder of the Department of Accordion at the Lamont School of Music
- Roger De Koven, actor on stage, radio, film and TV; star of Peabody Award-winning radio drama Against the Storm
- Lydia R. Diamond (B.S. 1992), playwright and professor at Boston University
- Cynthia Dobrinski, handbell composer and clinician
- Ivan Doig (B.S.J., M.S.J.), novelist
- Tananarive Due, novelist and journalist, The Living Blood
- Andy Duncan, former member of OK Go
- Mary Dunleavy, soprano
- Wilma Dykeman, writer
- Timothy Ferris, science author
- William R. Ferris (M.A. 1965), former chairman of the National Endowment for the Humanities
- Gillian Flynn (M.S.), author of mystery novels and former television critic at Entertainment Weekly
- Kyle Gann, composer, microtonalist
- Lillian Groag, playwright, theater director, and actress
- Shari Goldhagen, author
- Chester Gould, cartoonist
- James Green (B.A. 1966), author
- Ayun Halliday, author and actor
- Amir Hamed, Uruguayan writer
- D. Antoinette Handy, flautist
- Howard Hanson, composer
- Sheldon Harnick, lyricist
- Aleksandar Hemon (M.A. 1996), author and MacArthur Fellow, The Lazarus Project, Nowhere Man
- Richard Hillert (M.M / PhD M.), composer, organist, and professor of music
- Myron Hunt, architect
- Payal Kapadia (M.S.J. 1999), author; winner of the Crossword Book Award for Best Children's Writing in India, 2013
- Brendan Kelly, member of The Lawrence Arms
- Ardis Krainik (B.S. 1951), former general manager of the Lyric Opera of Chicago
- Jay Krush, tubist
- William Lava, composer
- Laura Lippman (B.S.J.), mystery novelist
- Attica Locke (B.S. 1995), author and writer/producer for television and film
- Margaret Lloyd, soprano
- George R.R. Martin (B.S.J. 1970, M.S.J. 1971), author, A Game of Thrones
- Luke Matheny (B.S.J. 1997), director and star of 2011 Academy Award-winning short film God of Love
- Joy McCullough, author
- Robert McHenry, encyclopedist and author
- Sherrill Milnes, baritone
- Audrey Niffenegger (M.F.A. 1991), novelist and artist; author of The Time Traveller's Wife
- Bruce Norris (B.A. 1982), Pulitzer Prize-winning playwright of Clybourne Park
- Tawni O'Dell (B.S.J. 1986), novelist, Sister Mine, Coal Run, Back Roads
- Karen A. Page, writer
- John Park, singer
- Marge Piercy, novelist and poet
- Leslie Pietrzyk, writer
- Neal Pollack (B.S.J. 1992), satirical author and journalist
- Joshua Radin, singer-songwriter
- Kathy Reichs, author
- Steve Rodby, jazz bassist
- Ned Rorem, composer
- Tina Rosenberg (B.A. 1981, M.S.J.), Pulitzer Prize-winning author and journalist
- Veronica Roth, New York Times best-selling author of Divergent
- William M. Runyan, Christian songwriter who composed "Great Is Thy Faithfulness"
- Karen Russell (B.A. 2003), author of St. Lucy's Home for Girls Raised by Wolves and Swamplandia!
- Thom Russo (B.A 1988), Grammy-winning record producer, mixer, musician
- David Sanborn, saxophonist
- Brian L. Schmidt, game composer and sound designer
- Joseph Schwantner, composer
- Sandra Seacat, actress and acting teacher/coach; director of In the Spirit
- Michael J. Shannon, actor
- Sidney Sheldon, author (never graduated)
- Nana Shineflug, dancer, choreographer, founder of the Chicago Moving Company
- Philip Skinner, opera singer
- Jon Solomon, DJ and record label owner
- Warren Spector, game designer
- Michael Sprinker, late literary theorist
- Peter Stuart (B.A. Film, 1989), singer-songwriter, lead vocalist of Dog's Eye View
- Frederick Swann, concert organist, composer, and past president of the American Guild of Organists
- Jerod Impichchaachaaha' Tate, composer
- Dustin Thao, author
- Stephen Tharp, organist and composer
- Augusta Read Thomas (B.M. 1987), composer
- Trevanian, author
- Gil Trythall (M.M. 1952), composer and pianist
- Thomas Tyra (B.A. 1954, M.A. 1955), composer, music educator, bandmaster
- Mildred Lund Tyson, composer
- Walter Wager, author
- Nike Wagner, author
- Kate Walbert (B.A. 1983), National Book Award-nominated writer, author of A Short History of Women
- Britt Walford, drummer and guitarist (did not graduate)
- Margaret Walker (B.A. 1935), poet and author
- Doug Wamble (M.M. 1997), musician and composer
- Joshua Weiner (B.A. 1985), poet, author of The World's Room
- Claude Porter White, composer
- Paul Winter, musician
- Rachael Yamagata (B.S. 1997), musician
- Kate Zambreno (B.S. 1999), novelist, essayist, critic, and professor
- Claire Zulkey, author

== Politics, government, and public policy ==
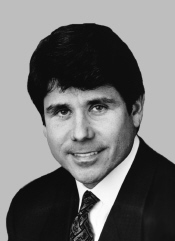
Rod Blagojevich

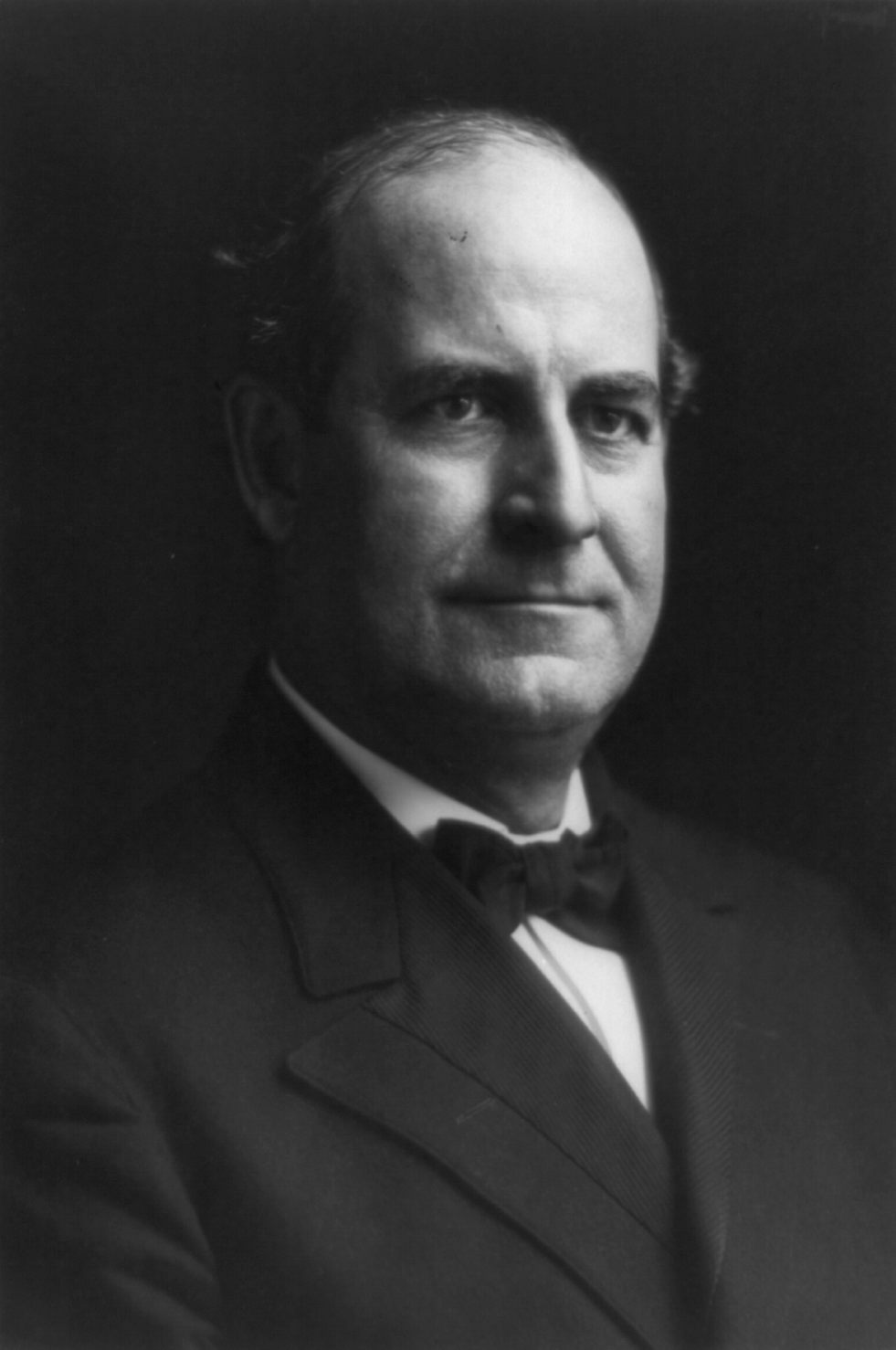
William Jennings Bryan

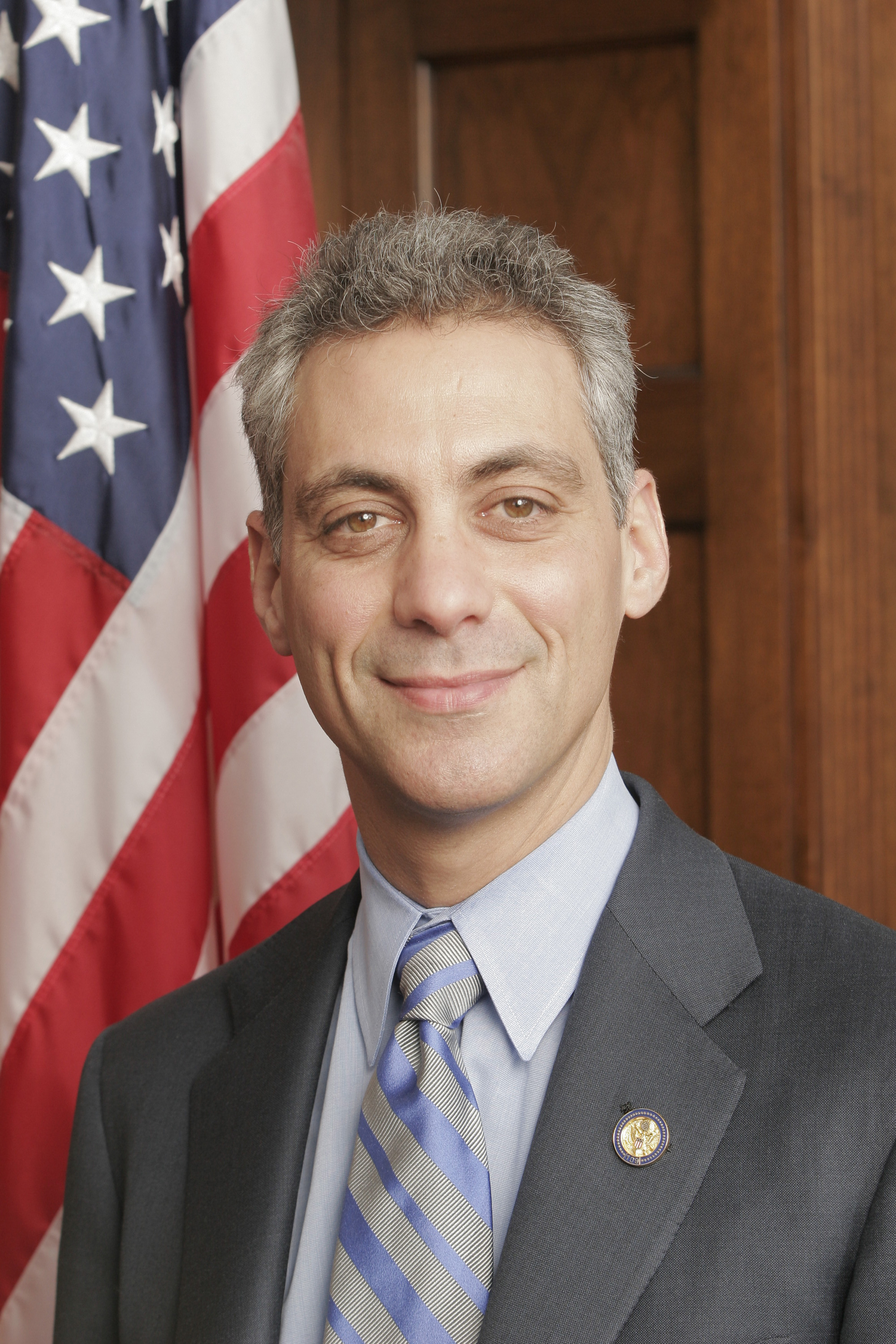
Rahm Emanuel

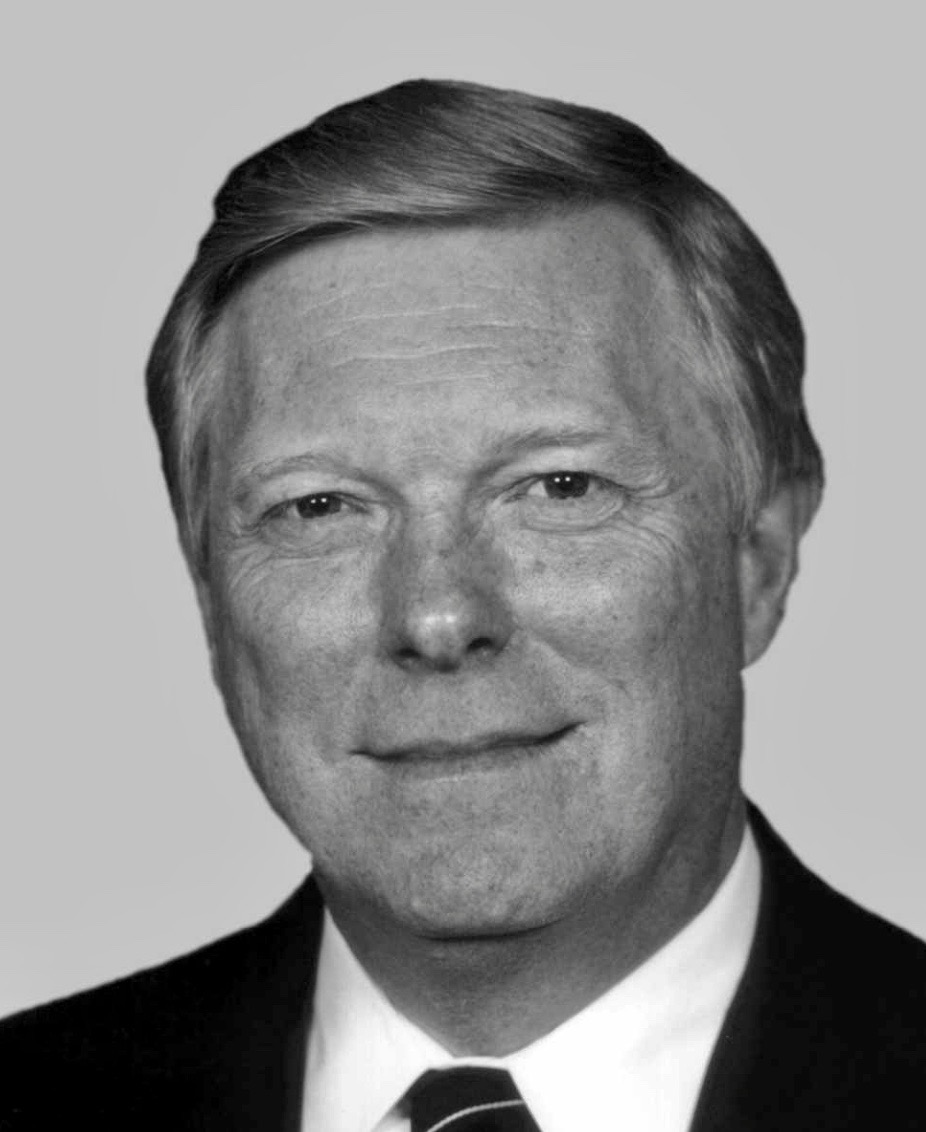
Dick Gephardt

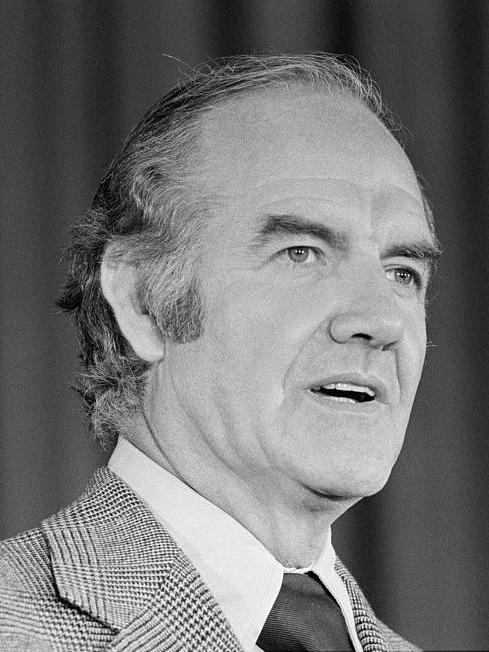
George McGovern

=== United States executive branch ===
- Michael Bakalis (B.A. 1959, M.A. 1962, Ph.D. 1966), former deputy secretary of Education in the US Department of Education
- George Ball, former undersecretary of state
- William Jennings Bryan, secretary of state and three-time Democratic presidential nominee
- Wendy Chamberlin (B.S. 1970), former U.S. ambassador to Pakistan; former assistant administrator, USAID Bureau for Asia and the Near East
- James L. Connaughton, chairman of the Council on Environmental Quality
- Michael Faulkender (Ph.D. 2002), former deputy secretary of the Treasury
- D. Cameron Findlay (B.A. 1982), former deputy secretary of the U.S. Department of Labor, former deputy assistant to President George H. W. Bush at the White House
- Wendy Lee Gramm, former head of the Commodity Futures Trading Commission
- Robert Hanssen (M.B.A. 1971), former FBI agent who engaged in spying for the Soviet Union and Russia against the United States
- Loy W. Henderson (B.A. 1915), former United States Foreign Service officer
- Edwin M. Martin, former United States Foreign Service officer
- Lowell B. Mason (LL.B., 1916), chair of the Federal Trade Commission
- April McClain Delaney (B.S., 1986), former deputy assistant secretary of commerce for communications and information
- Allan I. Mendelowitz (Ph.D., 1971), chair of the Federal Housing Finance Board
- Newton Minow, former director of the Federal Communications Commission
- Phyllis Oakley (B.A. 1956), former assistant secretary of state for intelligence and research, the State Department
- Steven C. Preston (B.A. 1982), former U.S. secretary of Housing and Urban Development
- J. Leonard Reinsch, former White House press secretary
- Alec Ross (B.A., 1994), senior adviser on Innovation to Secretary of State Hillary Clinton
- Mel Sembler (B.S. 1952), former U.S. ambassador to Italy
- Eric W. Stromayer (B.A. 1982), former U.S. ambassador to Togo
- Richard E. Wiley (B.S. 1955, J.D.), former chairman of the Federal Communications Commission

=== United States Senate ===
- Dale Bumpers (J.D. 1951), former U.S. senator and governor of Arkansas
- Francis H. Case, former U.S. senator
- John Hoeven (M.B.A. 1981), U.S. senator from North Dakota; former governor of North Dakota
- George McGovern, South Dakota senator and 1972 Democratic candidate for president

=== United States House of Representatives ===
- Cindy Axne, Democratic congresswoman, Iowa
- Judy Biggert, Republican congresswoman
- Cardiss Collins, former U.S. representative from Illinois
- Dick Gephardt, former House Democratic leader
- Earl Hutto, former U.S. representative from Florida
- Steve Kagen, U.S. representative from Wisconsin
- Scott L. Klug (M.S.J. 1976), former U.S. representative from Wisconsin
- Jim Kolbe, former U.S. representative from Arizona
- Dan Lipinski (B.S. 1988), U.S. representative from Illinois
- Blake Moore (MS 2018), U.S. representative from Utah
- George M. O'Brien (B.A. 1939), former U.S. representative from Illinois
- John Edward Porter (B.S. and B.A 1957), former U.S. representative from Illinois
- Brad Schneider (MBA 1988), U.S. representative from Illinois
- Suhas Subramanyam (J.D.), U.S. representative from Virginia
- Mike Synar (M.A. 1974), former U.S. representative from Oklahoma

=== Statewide officeholders ===
- Charlie Baker, governor of Massachusetts
- Rod Blagojevich, governor of Illinois (2003–2009), former prisoner; commuted by President Trump (February 2020)
- Dennis Daugaard (J.D. 1978), governor of South Dakota; former lieutenant governor of South Dakota
- Frank Orren Lowden, former governor of Illinois
- Dawn Clark Netsch (B.A. 1948), Illinois comptroller and Democratic nominee for governor in 1994
- JB Pritzker (J.D. 1993), governor of Illinois
- Pat Quinn, former governor of Illinois
- Adlai Stevenson, Illinois governor and two-time Democratic presidential nominee
- James R. Thompson, former governor of Illinois
- Judy Baar Topinka, former state treasurer of Illinois; Republican gubernatorial candidate, 2006 election
- Dan Walker, former governor of Illinois

=== State legislators ===
- William M. Bray, Wisconsin Senate
- John A. Cade (M.B.A. 1954), Maryland Senate
- Jennifer Conlin (M.A.), Michigan House of Representatives
- Emery Crosby, Wisconsin State Assembly
- Eric Fingerhut (B.S.), Ohio Senate and nominee for U.S. senator in 2004
- Warren A. Grady, Wisconsin State Assembly
- Corwin C. Guell, Wisconsin State Assembly
- Liz Krueger (B.A.), New York state senator
- Steve Litzow (B.A.), Washington state senator from Mercer Island
- John L. McEwen, Wisconsin State Assembly
- Carroll Metzner, Wisconsin State Assembly
- John J. Nimrod, Illinois state senator
- Ora R. Rice, speaker of the Wisconsin State Assembly
- Barbara Ulichny, former Wisconsin state senator
- Travis Weaver, member of Illinois House of Representatives

=== Local officeholders ===
- Matthew Bogusz (B.A. 2008), mayor of Des Plaines, Illinois
- Dan Cronin, DuPage County board chairman and former state senator
- Rahm Emanuel, mayor of Chicago, former aide to Bill Clinton, former Democratic congressman of Illinois's 5th congressional district and former White House chief of staff of President Barack Obama
- Edward J. FitzSimons (J.D.), mayor of Mettawa, Illinois
- Stanley Kusper (J.D.), Cook County clerk
- Ruth U. Keeton, Maryland politician
- Henry Day Penfield, mayor of Evanston, Illinois
- Harold Washington (J.D. 1952), first black mayor of Chicago
- Lois Weisberg (B.S. 1946), commissioner, Chicago Department of Cultural Affairs

=== Activists ===
- Mary A. Ahrens, social reformer and suffragist
- Nathan Daschle, former Democratic Governors Association executive director
- Karen DeCrow (B.S. 1959), former president of the National Organization for Women
- Al From, founder and current CEO of the Democratic Leadership Council
- Chrissy Gephardt, prominent LGBT rights political advocate, daughter of Dick Gephardt
- Barbara Gittings, LGBT activist
- Catherine Waugh McCulloch, suffragist
- Terry O'Neill (B.A.), president of the National Organization for Women (NOW)
- Gary Rader, Green Beret Army reservist who burned his draft card in 1967
- Atour Sargon (MA), Assyrian American activist, first ethnic Assyrian elected to the Lincolnwood board of trustees
- Lee Weiner (Ph.D.), defendant, Chicago Seven

=== International figures ===
- Armida Alisjahbana (M.A. 1987), State Minister of National Development Planning, head of National Development Planning Agency (BAPPENAS), Republic of Indonesia
- Artidjo Alkostar (LLM 2002), Supreme Court Justice, Republic of Indonesia
- Flávio Arns, Brazilian senator from Paraná
- Kwaku Baah, Ghanaian lawyer and politician
- Ali Babacan (M.B.A. 1992), deputy prime minister of Turkey
- Alexander De Croo, prime minister of Belgium
- Ingvar Carlsson, prime minister of Sweden
- Salem Chalabi, ex-general director of the Iraqi Special Tribunal
- Cheddi Jagan, dentist, former president of Guyana
- Claudia López Hernández, mayor of Bogotá, Colombia
- Meghan, Duchess of Sussex (born Rachel Meghan Markle; August 4, 1981), member of British royal family; former actress
- Eduardo Mondlane, revolutionary leader of Mozambique
- Amos Sawyer, former president of Liberia
- Simcha Rothman, lawyer, member of Parliament in the Israeli Knesset
- Eduardo Stein, vice president of Guatemala
- Tung Hsiang-lung, Minister of Veterans Affairs Council, and former commander-in-chief of the Republic of China Navy

== Sports ==
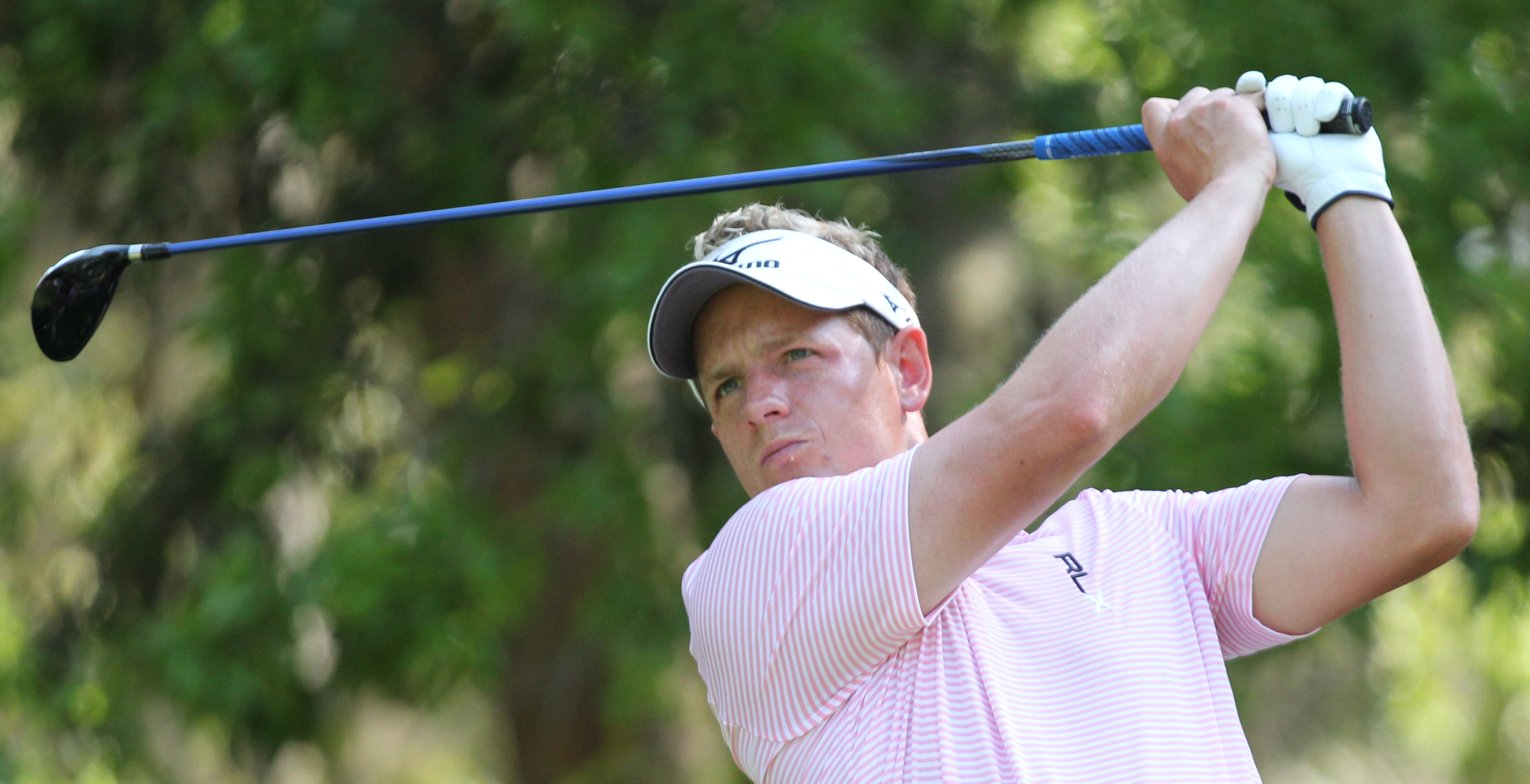
Luke Donald

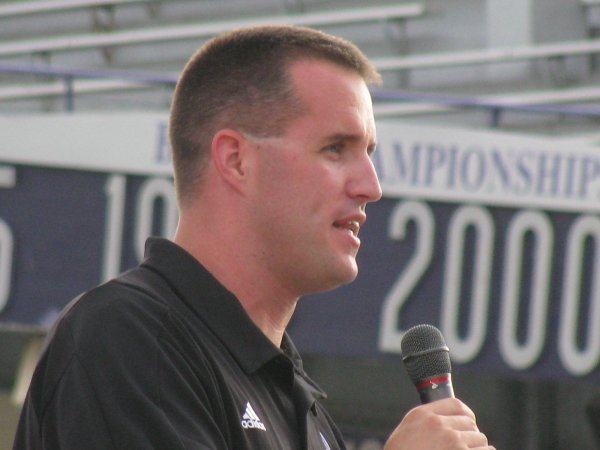
Pat Fitzgerald

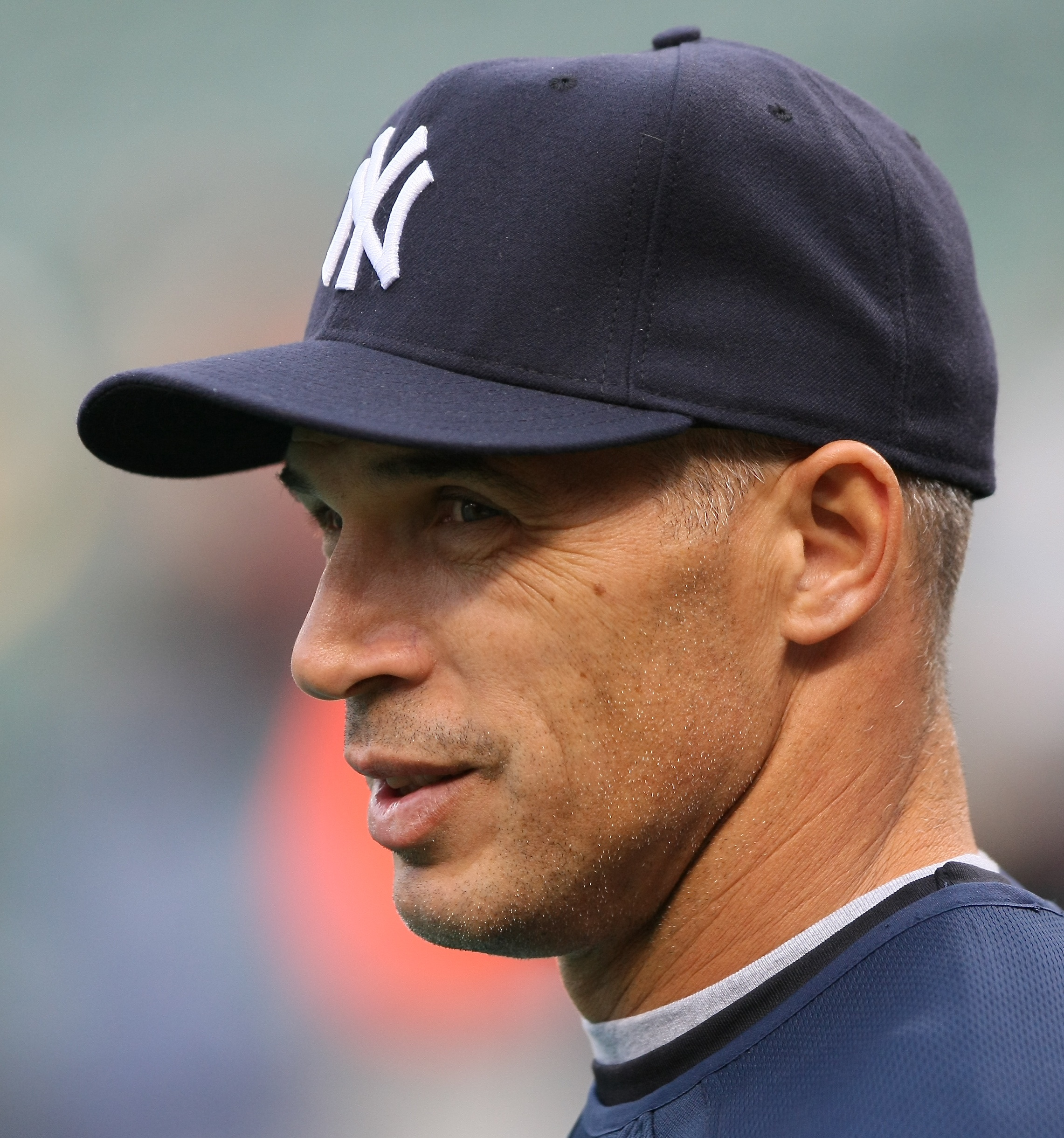
Joe Girardi

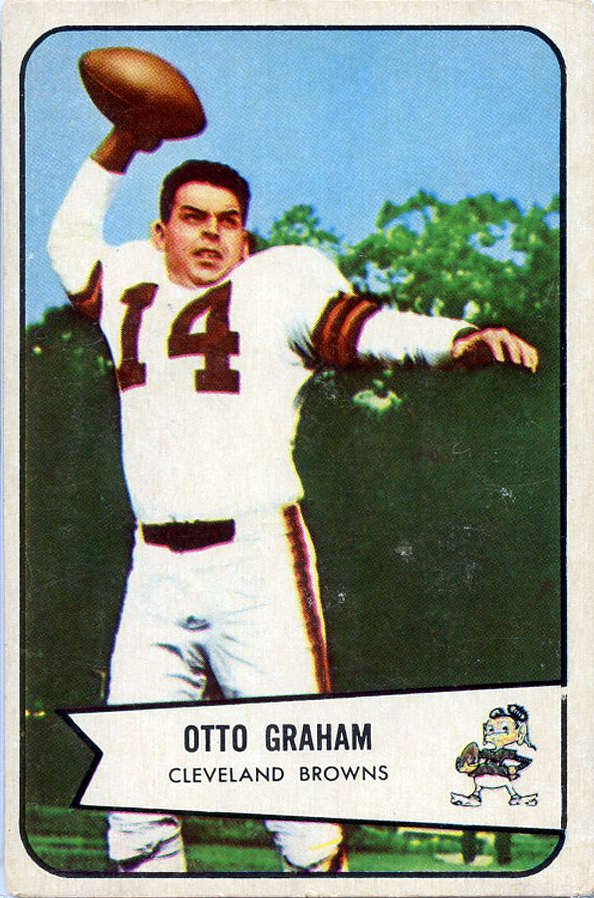
Otto Graham

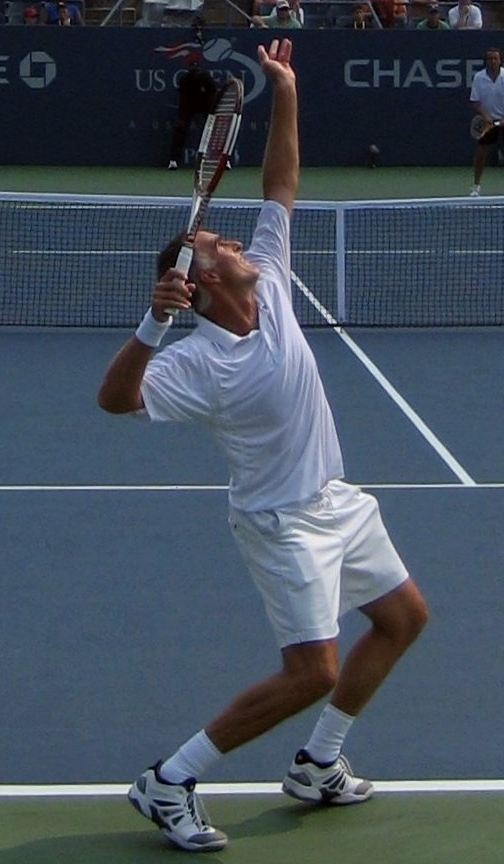
Todd Martin

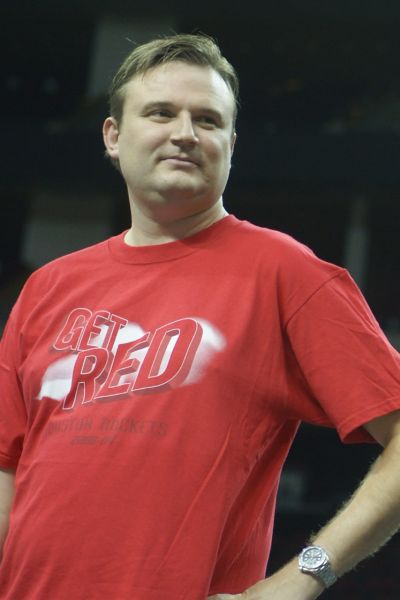
Daryl Morey

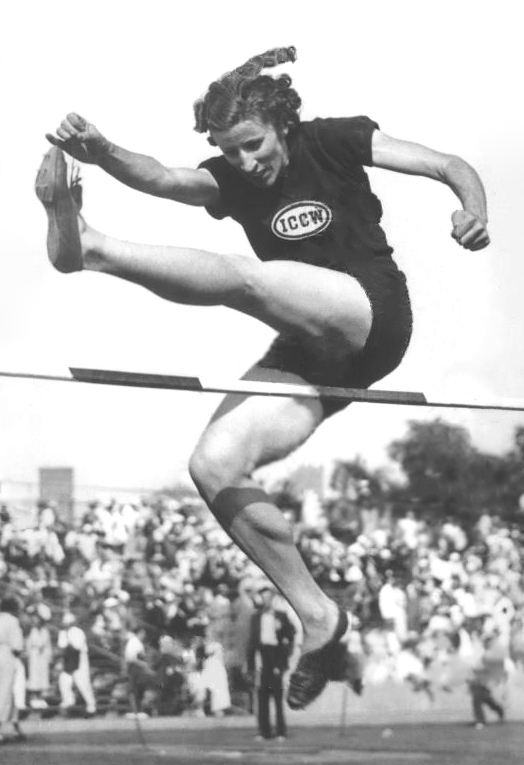
Annette Rogers

=== Baseball ===
- Jerry Doggett, former broadcaster for the Los Angeles Dodgers
- Eddie Einhorn (J.D. 1960), vice chairman of the Chicago White Sox
- Luke Farrell (B.S. 2013), pitcher for the Texas Rangers
- Joe Girardi, former baseball player and Philadelphia Phillies manager
- J. A. Happ, baseball player
- Mike Huff, former baseball player
- Eric Jokisch, pitcher for the Kiwoom Heroes of the KBO
- George Kontos, 2012 World Series champion with the San Francisco Giants
- Mike Koplove (attended, never graduated), Major League Baseball pitcher
- Kenesaw Mountain Landis (J.D. 1891), first commissioner of Baseball, jurist, federal judge
- Mark Loretta, baseball player
- Jerry Reinsdorf (J.D. 1960), owner of the Chicago White Sox and Chicago Bulls
- Mark Walter, (J.D. 1985) founder and CEO of Guggenheim Partners, chairman of the Los Angeles Dodgers

=== Basketball ===
- Don Adams, former NBA and ABA player
- Pat Baldwin, college basketball coach for the University of Wisconsin, Milwaukee
- Nia Brodie (born 1995), WNBA player
- Jim Burns, former NBA and ABA player
- Veronica Burton, WNBA player
- Drew Crawford (born 1990), basketball player who last played for Bnei Herzliya of the Israeli Ligat HaAl
- Erin Dickerson Davis, college basketball coach
- Frank Ehmann, All-American basketball player
- Evan Eschmeyer, former basketball player
- Jake Fendley, former NBA player for the Fort Wayne Pistons
- Glen Grunwald (J.D. 1984), executive for the New York Knicks
- Willie Jones, former NBA player
- Vic Law, NBA player for Orlando Magic
- Billy McKinney, former NBA player, current director of scouting for the Milwaukee Bucks
- Daryl Morey (B.S. 1996), general manager of the Philadelphia 76ers
- Max Morris, All-American football and basketball player
- Dererk Pardon (born 1996), American basketball player for Hapoel Be'er Sheva of the Israeli Basketball Premier League
- Dan Peterson, basketball coach
- Kevin Rankin, basketball player and insurance underwriter
- Joe Reiff, basketball player and referee
- Jerry Reinsdorf (J.D. 1960), owner of the Chicago Bulls and the Chicago White Sox
- Joe Ruklick, former NBA player for the Philadelphia Warriors, gave Wilt Chamberlain the final assist in his 100 point game
- Anucha Browne Sanders (B.S. 1985), former executive for New York Knicks
- John Shurna (born 1990), former basketball player
- Pat Spencer, lacrosse and basketball player
- Rick Sund, former general manager for the Atlanta Hawks

=== Figure skating ===
- Ronald Joseph, figure skater and long jumper
- Debi Thomas (M.D. 1997), figure skater

=== Football ===
- Mike Adamle, football player and sportscaster
- Adetomiwa Adebawore, football player
- Dick Alban, football player
- Frank Aschenbrenner, football player
- Darryl Ashmore, football player
- Darnell Autry, football player and actor
- Frank Baker, football player
- Cas Banaszek, football player
- Brett Basanez, football player
- D'Wayne Bates, football player
- Evan Beerntsen, football player
- Sid Bennett, football player
- George Benson, football player
- Kevin Bentley, football player
- Earnest Brown IV, defensive end for the Los Angeles Rams
- Hank Bruder, football player
- Corbin Bryant, football player
- Ron Burton, football player, Boston Patriots (now known as New England Patriots)
- Ibraheim Campbell, football player
- Woody Campbell, football player
- Austin Carr, football player, New Orleans Saints
- Luis Castillo, football player, San Diego Chargers
- Bob Christian, football player, Atlanta Falcons
- Barry Cofield, football player, Washington Redskins
- Joe Collier, football head coach, Buffalo Bills
- Irv Cross, football player
- Andy Cvercko, football player
- Bill DeCorrevont, football player for four NFL teams
- Garrett Dickerson, football player
- John L. "Paddy" Driscoll, football player
- Curtis Duncan, football player, Houston Oilers
- Jeremy Ebert, football player
- Tiny Engebretsen, football player
- Trai Essex, football player, Pittsburgh Steelers and Indianapolis Colts
- Paddy Fisher, football linebacker
- Pat Fitzgerald, two-time All-American player, former Northwestern head football coach
- Barry Gardner, football player
- Joe Gaziano, football player
- Otto Graham, football player
- Nate Hall, football player
- Blake Hance, football player
- Napoleon Harris, football player, Oakland Raiders and Minnesota Vikings
- Montre Hartage, football player
- Noah Herron, football player, Green Bay Packers
- Chris Hinton, seven-time Pro Bowl player, Indianapolis Colts, Atlanta Falcons and Minnesota Vikings
- Evan Hull, football player
- Godwin Igwebuike, football player, Tampa Bay Buccaneers, San Francisco 49ers and Philadelphia Eagles
- Justin Jackson, football player, Los Angeles Chargers
- Paul Janus, football player
- Luke Johnsos, football player
- Mike Kafka, football player and coach
- Jim Keane, football player
- Doc Kelley, football player
- John Kidd, NFL punter for five teams
- Elbert Kimbrough, football player
- Bob Koehler, football player
- Tyler Lancaster, football player
- Dean Lowry, football player
- Sherrick McManis, football player, Chicago Bears
- Cameron Mitchell, football player
- Alex Moyer, football player
- Greg Newsome II, cornerback for the Cleveland Browns
- Hunter Niswander, NFL punter
- Matt O'Dwyer, football player
- Ifeadi Odenigbo, football player
- Ted Phillips, Chicago Bears president and CEO
- Kyle Prater, NFL wide receiver
- Nick Roach, football player, Chicago Bears
- Jack Rudnay, football player
- Pete Shaw, football player
- Trevor Siemian, football player, Denver Broncos and Minnesota Vikings
- Peter Skoronski, football player
- Ben Skowronek, football player
- Rashawn Slater, offensive tackle for the Los Angeles Chargers
- Zach Strief, football player
- Tyrell Sutton, football player, Carolina Panthers
- Clayton Thorson, football player, Dallas Cowboys
- Steve Tasker, football player, sports announcer, Buffalo Bills
- Rob Taylor, football player and head coach
- Caleb Tiernan, football player
- Danny Vitale, football player
- Anthony Walker Jr., football player
- Ray Wietecha, football player
- Fred Williamson, football player
- Eric Wilson, football player
- George Wilson, football player and head coach
- Corey Wootton, football player, Chicago Bears
- Jason Wright, running back and business executive

=== Golf ===
- Jim Benepe, golfer
- Luke Donald, golfer
- Matt Fitzpatrick, golfer
- David Lipsky, golfer
- David Merkow, golfer

=== Hockey ===
- Rocky Wirtz, owner of the Chicago Blackhawks

=== Horse racing ===
- David Israel (B.S.J. 1973), former chair of the California Horse Racing Board, former president of the Los Angeles Memorial Coliseum Commission

=== Race car driving ===
- Paul Dana, former race car driver in the Indy Racing League

=== Soccer ===
- Tyler Miller, professional soccer player

=== Swimming ===
- Federico Burdisso, bronze medalist in the men's 200-meter butterfly at the Tokyo Olympics
- Ralph Breyer, gold medalist in the men's 800-meter free relay at the Paris Olympics of 1924, four-time NCAA champion and recipient of the Big Ten medal of honor
- Matt Grevers, winner of four gold and two silver Olympic medals in multiple events in 2008 and 2012
- Christine Rawak, swimming coach, athletic director at the University of Delaware
- Bob Skelton, 1924 Olympic gold medalist in 200-meter breaststroke
- Jordan Wilimovsky, 2015 World Champion in the 10 km open water race; Rio and Tokyo Olympian

=== Tennis ===
- Katrina Adams, tennis player, president of the USTA
- Audra Cohen, 2007 NCAA women's singles champion (never graduated)
- Grant Golden (1929–2018), tennis player
- Clark Graebner, tennis player
- Seymour Greenberg (1920–2006), tennis player
- Todd Martin, tennis player
- Marty Riessen, tennis player

=== Track and field ===
- Jim Golliday, track
- Annette Rogers, sprinter

=== Professional softball ===
- Tammy Williams, shortstop, won world championship with Team USA in 2010 and National Pro Fastpitch championship with Chicago Bandits in 2011

=== Wrestling ===
- Jake Herbert, Olympian
- Tank Ledger, WWE wrestler

=== Curling ===
- Andrew Stopera, curler

== Other ==
- Susan Thompson Buffett, philanthropist; wife of Warren Buffett
- Laurie Dann, mass shooter who attacked elementary school children in Winnetka, Illinois
- Patti Davis (attended, never graduated), daughter of Ronald Reagan and Nancy Davis Reagan
- Vernard Eller, (M.A.) author and Christian pacifist
- Lisa Franchetti (B.S.J., 1985) 33rd Chief of Naval Operations
- John L. Jerstad (B.A., 1940), Medal of Honor recipient (awarded posthumously), Operation Tidal Wave
- Vergel L. Lattimore (Ph.D.), Air National Guard brigadier general
- Amy Kellogg Morse, (1875, Ph.B.) , president, Wisconsin State Woman's Christian Temperance Union
- Robert W. Parker (1986), U.S. Air Force major general
- Davis C. Rohr, U.S. Air Force major general
- David N. Senty, U.S. Air Force major general
- Claudius B. Spencer, (Hon. D.D., 1881) pastor and editor
