= Consultant =

Professional who provides advice in their specific field of expertise

A consultant (from Latin: consultare "to deliberate") is a professional (also known as expert, specialist, see variations of meaning below) who provides advice or services in an area of specialization (generally to medium or large-size corporations). Consulting services generally fall under the domain of professional services, as contingent work.

The Harvard Business School defines a consultant as someone who advises on "how to modify, proceed in, or streamline a given process within a specialized field".

== Subject-matter expert vs. consultant ==
According to Institute of Management Consultants USA, "The value of a consultant [as compared to a subject-matter expert (SME)] is to be able to correctly diagnose and effectively transform an often ill-defined problem and apply information, resources and processes to create a workable and usable solution. Some experts are good consultants and vice versa, some are neither, few are both." Another differentiation would be that a consultant sells advice, whereas an expert sells their expertise. Other differentiations exist for consultants vs. coaches or SMEs vs. team leaders.

Consultants do not have to be subject-matter experts as consulting agreements are a form of labor contract - comparable to staffing, which a client procures for more generalized labor, whereas consulting is for more specialized labor. Thus, in contrast to advisory services, which is not a labor contract but an actual service (advisory services never become part of the procuring organization) the market for consulting agreements follows the demand for specialized labor in the form of a consulting procurement, and so while competence and experience is naturally an advantage for when looking to sell consulting services, it is not a prerequisite in the same way that it is for advisory services where the service provider per definition relies on some level of competence and experience for its relevance.

== Contractor vs. consultant ==
Sometimes, the word consultant applies specifically to someone or organization that provides knowledge, advice or service; whereas the contractor builds something for the client.

== Role ==
The role of a consultant outside the medical sphere (where the term is used specifically for a grade of doctor) can fall under one of two general categories:

- Internal consultant: someone who is either employed by or contracted by a client organization, and operates within a client-organization, sometimes within an internal consultancy unit.; or
- External consultant: someone who is employed externally to the client, either by a consulting firm, some other agency or as an independent freelancer, whose expertise is provided under contract for a fee or rate.

=== Business case for hiring a consultant ===
By procuring consulting services, clients may acquire access to higher grades of expertise than would be financially feasible for them to retain in-house on a long-term basis. Moreover, clients can control their expenditures on consulting services by only purchasing as much services from the outside consultant as desired. Additionally, consultants are key persons with specific domain-skills in creating strategies, leading change (e.g. digitalization), leadership coaching, interim management (also called consultant manager), etc.

Another business-case is that a consultant may save the company money: for example, a specialist tax-consultant who saves the company 20% on its taxes, and only charges 10% in fees, enables the company to net a 10% savings. A portion of professional services in demand for clients are simply not necessary to retain in house, as they may be sporadic in nature, at which a consultant offers a reduction in payroll for the client.

In the UK government sector, since 2010 the Cabinet Office has required government departments to implement spending controls which restrict the appointment of consultants and temporary staff in order to regulate consultancy expenditure and ensure that the use of consultants offers value for money. A National Audit Office report published in 2015 recommended that all UK government departments adopt a "strategic plan" to assess their current skills and expected "skill gaps", so that their future need for consultants and temporary staff could be better predicted.

=== Delivery of service ===
Consultants provide their services to their clients in a variety of forms. Reports and presentations are often used. Advice can be general (high degree of quality of communication) and also domain-focused. However, in some specialized fields, the consultant may develop as well as implement customized software or other products for the client. Depending on the nature (also named mandate or statement of work or assignment) of the consulting services and the wishes of the client, the advice from the consultant may be made public, by placing the report or presentation online, or the advice may be kept confidential (under a Non-disclosure agreement or within the clients-company), and only given to the senior executives of the organization.

== Employment status and career distinction ==
Consultants work for (consulting) firms or as freelance contractors. A consultant differs from a temporary worker insofar as they have, as detailed above, a highly specialized career and domain knowledge. This could be true for a temporary worker too, however, for example a medical consultant is unlikely to suddenly become a hotel receptionist, whereas a temporary worker might change domains and branches more frequently. Furthermore, a consultant usually signs a service-type employee contract (known as fixed-term, full-time, part-time), whereas a temporary worker will only be offered a temporary (and scope limited) contract or a work-results type contract (e. g. in Germany a specific type of contract called Werksvertrag) to fulfill or create a specific work. Additionally, a temporary worker might be directed and managed by a client, whereas a consultant is employed by a company (or self) and provides services for a client. The consultant may not be provided work-related instruments or tools, but only the necessary infrastructure and accesses the consultant needs to fulfill the statement of work, e.g. access to internal IT networks or client-side laboratory. Moreover, a consultant might engage in multi-project services (matrix organization) for the client or for internal projects/activities at the employer firm.

In his book, The Consulting Bible, Alan Weiss defines that "When we [consultants] walk away from a client, the client's conditions should be better than it was before we arrived or we've failed." There is no legal protection given to the job title 'consultant'.

The consultant's career path is usually not at the client's side, however the consultant will very likely be introduced into the client's organizational program or project structure.

Novel collaborations of expert-contractors or independent consultants especially in ICT sector exist, e.g. ThoughtWorks.

=== Consulting scope ===
A consultant's activity can last anywhere from an hourly consultation, to a one-day service, three months, 12 months or more. For complex projects, a longer period is needed for the consultant to analyze, resolve the root cause, get to know the stakeholders and organizational-situation, etc. Usually the engagement has set legal boundaries under given law to avoid (specifically for freelance-contractors) the problem of false self-employment (see also Umbrella company). The person at client location is sometimes called a Resident. By spending time at the client's organization, the consultant is able to observe work processes, interview workers, managers, executives, board members, or other individuals, and study how the organization operates to provide their services.

In some settings, a consultant is signing a specific contract and is hired as an interim manager or executive with advanced authority or shared responsibility or decision making of client-side activities, filling a vacant position which could and cannot be filled with an internal candidate. This is often the case by the client-organization due to other constraints, such as corporate compliance and HR-processes, which lead to prolonged hiring paths beyond six months, which is often unacceptable for leadership roles.

=== Work location ===
Research and analysis can occur at the consultants' offices (sometimes called back office) or home-offices or via remote work. In the case of smaller consulting firms, consultants typically work at the site of the client for at least some of the time. The governing factor on where a consultant works tends to be the amount of interaction required with other employees of the client. If a management consultant is providing advice to a software firm that is struggling with employee morale, absenteeism and issues with resignation by managers and senior engineers, the consultant will probably spend a good deal of time at the client's office, interviewing staff, engineers, managers and executives, and observing work processes. On the other hand, a legal consultant asked to provide advice on a specific property law issue might only have a few meetings at the client's office, and conduct the majority of his work at the consultant's office and in legal libraries.

Similarly, the growth of online, highly skilled consultant freelance marketplaces has begun to grow.

Additionally, the COVID-19 pandemic has resulted in an increase in remote work and demand for online-work skills to continue business or operations.

=== In-house consulting ===
Also known as ICUs - Internal Consulting Units, which are departments or specialists groups created by or maintained by usually larger companies for their own consulting service needs along the business chain. ICUs might be internal or own-run businesses.

=== Success factors of consulting ===
The following qualities are found to be helpful for a successful consulting career.

==== Accenture success factors ====
From Accenture blog, one of the main IT consultancies in the world, the following factors play an important role:

- A service-oriented mindset
- Sharing of great work
- Seizing of opportunities
- Setting of goals, seeking of advice and taking time to reflect

==== Bronnenmayer's success factors ====
Bronnenmayer et al. investigated, by applying a structural equation model, and due to little empirical research, the management consulting's success factors from a client perspective. It is found that Consultant Expertise, Intensity of Collaboration and Common Vision have strongest performance impact on success.

1. Common vision
2. Intensity of collaboration
3. Trust
4. Project management
5. Consultant expertise
6. Provided resources
7. Top management support

==== Sindermann and Sawyer success factors ====
Sindermann and Sawyer conclude in their book The Scientist as Consultant, that a [scientific] consultant is successful, if they have "achieved a viable mix of technical proficiency and business skills" with "technical proficiency" meaning excellence in competence, credibility, effective networking with colleagues, and ability to negotiate.

==== Hartel's 10 Golden Rules ====
According to management consultant Dirk Hartel, the following ten objectives or rules are key to a successful consulting career:

1. Customer first - Especially the meaning of being available (time) for customer needs
2. Appearance - Understanding of self-image and dress for the job
3. Determined friendliness - Having concrete mindset and goals, but being diplomatic too
4. Punctuality - Leading time management, starting and finishing on time, being prepared
5. Engagement and productivity - Supporting, being pro-active, etc.
6. Critical questioning - Nobody is born a consultant; asking the right questions is a key skill
7. Feedback - Request regular feedback, asking for critique rather than waiting for it
8. Acceptance of hierarchies - Professional navigation in client organization, knowing authority-levels, being respectful and being confidential with customer information
9. Stakeholder behavior - Study and understanding of client behavior and culture; inspiring stakeholders with presentations, etc.
10. Being courageous - Consulting-life is challenging, never lose trust in yourself, but also reflect and lead a positive and good life

=== Consulting challenges ===
==== Distinctness ====
Consultants are often outsiders to the client organization. On one hand, this means their work methods, expertise, behaviors, etc. differ from the client-employees and organizational, and is exactly what the client needs, however it can also be a considerable disadvantage for a successful engagement and may lead to a less intimate cooperation with the client's business.

==== Domain ====
Next to general challenges, domain-specific challenges for consultants exist. In palliative medicine consulting, emotions, beliefs, sensitive topics, difficulty communicating and prognosis interpretation, or patients expectations despite critical illness are some of the challenges faced by the consultant.

==== Ethical conflict (manipulation) ====
According to Kelman, "One danger is that [the counselor] does not recognize the control that he is exercising over the client's behavior. The other is that he is so convinced that he is doing good for the client that he does not realize the double-edged nature of the control he is exercising." A consultant therefore needs to be aware and in control of her or his manipulative influences in particular counseling settings.

==== Expectations (customer) ====
Hartel mentions several challenges that are based on the types of consultants, including a consultant in a short-term role, as integrator, as driver, as project manager or methodology guru, know-how expert, or as scapegoat.

In case of consultant as integrator, the consultant has the challenging task to resolve, negotiate, facilitate, mediate political situations in companies to move forward, such as different opinions, critical characters (persons), difficult relationships or interfaces, goal conflicts, power games, etc.

In case of consultant as scapegoat, the consultant, who is external to the company, is the one to announce difficult company decisions such as layoffs or reorganizations, but it is important that the consultant acts professional and competent, not just as "Rambo in suit".

==== Organizational ====
Consultants may face several organizational challenges, e. g. internal consultants are faced with the paradoxes to maintain a good balance between knowing the internal company structure and at the same time staying neutral and objective, keeping a marginal position between the client and the provided service. Further, depending on the hiring company's understanding how to work with a consultant, the consultant might be seen as disruption to the in-house employees status.

==== Rates of pay ====
Harrington notes that some people transferring from an employee role to working as a consultant are uncertain about how to price their services.

==== Other general challenges ====
General issues faced by a consultant can be stress, productivity issues with meetings, general "technostresses", high-paced and changing business environments and situations, etc.

==== Stakeholder management ====
In case of corporate and industrial consultants, the role is further challenged to act and become the "translator of information" from various different client-company cultures and procedures (processes) and between her or his employer-side team, managers and leadership team. What is an important goal to the current client is usually not similar for any other client due to multiple variations in company size, history, product, program, organizational structure, leadership, etc. Hence the consultant must be excellent in sensing and communicating between different layers in the organization and further across it, while maintaining authenticity, integrity and trustworthiness with all parties involved.

==== Taxation and legal status ====
Independent consultants (contractors or freelancer) usually need to fulfil taxation requirements given by laws, specifically challenging employment status to avoid 'disguised' employment.

Compared to contracting, consulting can be seen as being "in business in your own right", not controlled by your client, etc. placing a consultant "well outside" of e. g. IR35.

Alan Weiss provides 20 "factors" for consultants in the US (IRS), which are similar in other countries, to avoid or understand in terms of their business activity. Amongst those, the consultant is not supposed to be instructed by the client, should not receive similar training as employees, has the right to sub-contract, should not be integrated into the organizational structure, etc. to avoid legal-status and taxation issues.

== Qualifications ==
There is no single qualification to becoming a consultant, other than those laid down in relation to medical, psychological and engineering personnel who have attained this level-degree in it or professional licenses, such as Chartered Engineer.

Consultants may hold undergraduate degrees, graduate degrees, professional degrees or professional designations pertaining to their field(s) of expertise. In some fields, a consultant may be required to hold certain professional licenses (e.g., a civil engineer providing consulting on a bridge project may have to be a professional engineer). In other types of consulting, there may be no specific qualification requirements. A legal consultant may have to be a member of the bar or hold a law degree. An accounting consultant may have to have an accounting designation, such as Chartered Accountant status. Some individuals become consultants after a lengthy and distinguished career as an executive or political leader or employee, so their lengthy and exposed experience may be their main asset.

== Accreditation ==
Various accreditation bodies for consultants exist:

- AACSB - Association to Advance Collegiate Schools of Business
- AMBA - Association of MBAs
- CIMC - Chartered Institute of Management Consultants (US)
- CMI - Chartered Management Institute (UK)
  - IC - Institute of Consulting (UK)
- EFMD - European Foundation for Management Development (EQUIS)
- FEANI - European federation of professional engineers
- Institute of Management Consultants (IMC USA)
- International Federation of Consulting Engineers (FIDIC)
- The International Council of Management Consulting Institutes (ICMCI)
- The Chartered Institute of Legal Executives - (CILEX), UK.
- The Institute of Commercial Management - (ICM), UK.

== Code of Ethics ==
Accredited practitioners in all fields (including medical) can be bound by a Code of Ethics or Code of Conduct.

Ethics in the field of business consulting and organizations is still a subject under research.

A thorough discussion of ethics in the field of consultation is given in Lippitt & Lippitt (see also 2nd edition in English). Here the authors mention several guidelines and definitions including Shay, the Association of Consulting Management Engineers (1966), American Society for Training and Development (1977), Academy of Management (1976) and conclude their own codex with the following attributes (see below). Additionally, the authors mention the difficulty in applying the codex and scenarios of how to track adherence and how to judge violations in accordance with other bodies, such as APA (American Psychological Association) and CSPEC (or CSCE) (Committee on Scientific and Professional Ethics) and conclude that "The most important aspect in the formulation of a code of conduct however, is the recognition of a fundamental moral standard. Only then is compliance with the rules guaranteed."

== Consulting domains ==
There exist various forms, types and areas or industries of consultants. The following list provides some examples:

=== Business (general) ===
- Franchise consulting
- Human resource consulting - Specialists who provide expertise around employment practice and people management.
- Interim management - Often independent consultants who act as interim executives (any CxO) with decision-making power under corporate policies or statutes. They may sit on specially constituted boards or committees.
- Performance consulting - Consultants who focus on the execution of an initiative or overall performance of their client.
- Management consulting - Professionals working on the development of and improvement to organizational strategy alongside senior management in many industries. ISO 20700 standard has been available since 2017.
- Market-entry consultant
- Media consultant
- Process consultants - Specialists in the design or improvement of e.g. operational processes in specific sectors, e.g. medical industry
- Statistical consultant
- Environment Consultant - a new off shoot of consulting helping industrial and infrastructural projects to mitigate the environmental impacts.
- Tax advisor

=== Technology ===
- Information-technology consulting - Experts in Computer-technology disciplines such as computer hardware, software engineering, or networks.

=== Construction ===
- Elevator consultant

=== Entertainment ===
- Creative consultant
- Image consulting
- Theatre consultant

=== Health ===
- Biotechnology consulting
- Consultant (medical) - the most senior grade of hospital doctor in the United Kingdom.
- Consultant pharmacist
- Consulting psychology
- Lactation consultant

=== Law and politics ===
- Economic analyst
- Employment consultant
- Environmental consulting
- Foreclosure consultant
- Immigration consultants - Help with the legal procedures of immigration from one country to another.
- Legal nurse consultant
- Political consulting
- Public sector consulting
- Trial consulting

=== Education ===
- Educational consultants - Assist students or parents in making educational decisions and giving advice in various issues, such as tuition, fees, visas, and enrolling in higher education.
- Faculty consultant

== List of notable (management) consultants ==
- Alan Weiss (entrepreneur)
- Arthur E. Andersen (Accenture)
- Bill Bain (Bain & Company)
- Edwin G. Booz, James L. Allen, Carl L. Hamilton
- Bruce Henderson (founder of BCG)
- Clay Christensen
- Fred Gluck
- Gary Hamel
- George Gallup (Gallup Inc.)
- Henry Mintzberg
- James O. McKinsey
- Michael Porter
- Peter Block
- Rajat Gupta

Further prominent thinkers are also listed in the Strategy portal.

== See also ==
- Business school
- Capital management
- Consulting firm
- Contingent workforce
- Gestor
- Interim management
- IRS Reclassification
- Knowledge transfer
- Management consulting
- Outline of consulting
- Permatemp
- Political consulting
- Project management
- Procurement
- Service bureau
- Strategic management
