= List of Kellogg School of Management alumni =

This is a list of Kellogg School of Management alumni.

== Academia ==
- Sally Blount (PhD in Organizational Behavior 1992), dean and Michael L. Nemmers Professor of Management and Organizations at Kellogg School of Management at Northwestern University
- Eric Ghysels (PhD in Managerial Economics and Decision Science 1985), Edward M. Bernstein Distinguished Professor of Economics and professor of Finance at University of North Carolina Chapel Hill
- Venkatesh Shankar (PhD in Marketing 1995), professor of Marketing and Coleman Chair in Marketing, director of Research at the Center for Retailing Studies at Mays Business School at Texas A&M University
- George Stigler (MBA 1932), professor of Economics, University of Chicago, 1982 Nobel Prize
- Maxim Sytch (PhD, 2011), professor of Management and Organizations at the Ross School of Business at the University of Michigan
- Glen L. Urban (PhD Managerial Economics and Decision Sciences, 1966), dean emeritus of MIT Sloan School of Management

== Professional services ==
- James L. Allen, founder of Booz Allen Hamilton consultancy, and namesake of the Kellogg School's executive education center
- Arthur E. Andersen, founder of Arthur Andersen
- Edwin G. Booz, founder of Booz Allen Hamilton consultancy
- Will Johnson, co-CEO of The Harris Poll

== Financial services ==
- Dean Chamberlain, CEO of Mischler Financial Group; former joint head of Fixed Income for Americas at Nomura Holdings
- Joseph E. Hasten, president & CEO, ShoreBank; former vice chairman, U.S. Bancorp
- Scott J. Freidheim, president and CEO of CDI Corporation
- Daniel Gamba, president of Franklin Templeton; former Chairman of CFA Institute Board of Governors
- Suzanne Iroche, CEO of FinBank
- David Kabiller, billionaire, co-founder of AQR Capital
- William A. Osborn, chairman and former CEO of Northern Trust Corporation
- Gary Parr, deputy chairman of Lazard
- Peter G. Peterson, former United States Secretary of Commerce and co-founder of Blackstone
- Patrick Ryan, founder and executive chairman of Aon Corporation
- Jaime Ruiz Sacristán, chairman of the Mexican Stock Exchange (2015–2020)
- Jeffrey W. Ubben, co-founder, CEO and CIO of ValueAct Capital
- Axel Wieandt, former CEO of Hypo Real Estate and Valovis Bank, and former divisional board member / managing director at Deutsche Bank
- Thomas J. Wilson, president and CEO of Allstate Insurance Company

== Consumer goods ==
- Douglas R. Conant, president and CEO of Campbell's
- Robert A. Eckert, partner at Friedman Fleischer & Lowe
- Betsy Holden, former CEO of Kraft Foods
- S. Curtis Johnson, former chairman of Diversey, Inc.
- Roshni Nadar, executive director and CEO of HCL Enterprise
- Peter Thum, founder of Ethos Water, entrepreneur
- Tony Vernon, former CEO of Kraft Foods Group

== Retail ==
- Brad Blum, CEO emeritus of Burger King
- Steve Odland, chairman and CEO of Office Depot
- Gregg Steinhafel, president, CEO, chairman of the board, Target Corporation
- Joey Wat, CEO of Yum China Holdings

== Media, sports, and entertainment ==
- Mallika Chopra, author, president of Intent
- Eddie George, professional football player, Heisman Trophy winner
- Rick Hahn, general manager of the Chicago White Sox
- Chris Jurasek, CEO, Chelsea F.C.
- Jeff Luhnow, former president and general manager, Houston Astros
- Meredith Marks, reality TV personality, The Real Housewives of Salt Lake City
- Kei Ogura, singer, songwriter and composer
- Ted Phillips, president and CEO, Chicago Bears
- Ben Thompson, writer of Stratechery
- John Thorrington, co-president and general manager, Los Angeles FC

== Industry ==
- Barry Cottle, CEO of Scientific Games Corporation
- Andrew Fastow, former CFO, Enron
- Scott J. Freidheim, president and CEO of CDI Corporation
- Ravin Gandhi, founder of GMM Nonstick Coatings
- Vinita D. Gupta, CEO of Lupin Limited
- Christopher G. Kennedy, chairman, Joseph P. Kennedy Enterprises
- David Kohler, president and CEO, Kohler Company
- Chris Kubasik, chair and CEO, L3Harris Technologies
- Ellen J. Kullman, chair and CEO, DuPont
- Ivan Menezes, CEO of Diageo
- Alex Molinaroli, CEO of Johnson Controls
- Roshni Nadar, executive director and CEO, HCL Corporation
- Steve Odland, president and CEO of the Committee for Economic Development
- Darren Woods, chairman and CEO, ExxonMobil

== Government ==
- Cindy Axne, member of the U.S. House of Representatives from Iowa, 2019–present
- Ali Babacan, deputy prime minister of Turkey, 2009–2015.
- Charlie Baker, governor of Massachusetts, 2015–present
- Esteban Bullrich, Argentine national deputy for Frente PRO, 2005–2009; Minister of Education, City of Buenos Aires 2010–present
- John Cebrowski, member of the New Hampshire House of Representatives
- Alexander De Croo, prime minister of Belgium
- Robert Dold, member of the U.S. House of Representatives from Illinois, 2011–2013; 2015–2017
- Jonathan Greenblatt, special assistant to the president and director of the Office of Social Innovation and Civic Participation in the Domestic Policy Council for the Obama Administration, 2011–present
- Robert Hanssen, Federal Bureau of Investigation agent who spied for Soviet and Russian intelligence services against the United States 1979–2001
- John Hoeven, governor of North Dakota, 2000–2010; U.S. senator, 2011–present
- Randy Hopper, Wisconsin state senator, 2009–2011
- Somkid Jatusripitak (PhD Marketing, 1984), deputy prime minister of Thailand, 2015–present; former Minister of Finance and Minister of Commerce of Thailand, 2001–2006
- Pramila Jayapal, member of the U.S. House of Representatives from Washington, 2016–present
- Ada Osakwe, former adviser to Nigeria's Minister of Agriculture and Rural Development
- Cesar Purisima, secretary of Trade & Industry, Republic of the Philippines, 2004–2005; secretary of Finance, Republic of the Philippines, 2010–2016
- Brad Schneider, member of the U.S. House of Representatives from Illinois, 2013–2015; 2018–present

== Technology ==
- Christopher Galvin, former chairman and CEO of Motorola
- Jalak Jobanputra, founder of FuturePerfect Ventures
- Bill McDermott, CEO of ServiceNow, former CEO of SAP (2010–2019)
- Roshni Nadar, chairperson of HCL Technologies
- Ginni Rometty, former CEO of IBM (2012–2020)
- Wen Yunsong, CEO of Unihub Global Networks

== Non-profit ==
- Roslyn M. Brock (MBA 1999), chairman of the NAACP
- Roshni Nadar (MBA 2008), founder and CEO of the Shiv Nadar Foundation
- John Wood (MBA 1989), founder and CEO of Room to Read
