= Sonita =

Sonita may refer to:

- Sonita kingdom, an ancient Indian kingdom
- Sonita Alleyne, Barbadian-British producer
- Sonita Alizadeh, Afghan rapper
- Sonita Gale, British film director, writer, and producer
- Sonita Lontoh, Indonesian-American businesswoman
- Sonita Sutherland, Jamaican athlete
- Sonita (film), a documentary about the Afghan rapper
- A common misspelling of Sinitta, an American–British singer
