= Risk arbitrage =

Investment strategy

Risk arbitrage, also known as merger arbitrage, is an investment strategy that speculates on the successful completion of mergers and acquisitions. An investor that employs this strategy is known as an arbitrageur. Risk arbitrage is a type of event-driven investing in that it attempts to exploit pricing inefficiencies caused by a corporate event.

== Basics ==
=== Mergers ===
In a merger, one company, the acquirer, makes an offer to purchase the shares of another company, the target. As compensation, the target will receive cash at a specified price, the acquirer's stock at specified ratio, or a combination of the two.

In a cash merger, the acquirer offers to purchase the shares of the target for a certain price in cash. The target's stock price will most likely increase when the acquirer makes the offer, but the stock price will remain below the offer value. In some cases, the target's stock price will increase to a level above the offer price. This would indicate that investors expect that a higher bid could be coming for the target, either from the acquirer or from a third party. To initiate a position, the arbitrageur will buy the target's stock. The arbitrageur makes a profit when the target's stock price approaches the offer price, which will occur when the likelihood of deal consummation increases. The target's stock price will be equal to the offer price upon deal completion.

In a stock merger, the acquirer offers to purchase the target by exchanging its own stock for the target's stock at a specified "swap ratio". To initiate a position, the arbitrageur will buy the target's stock and short sell the acquirer's stock. This process is called "setting a spread". The size of the spread positively correlates to the perceived risk that the deal will not be consummated at its original terms. The arbitrageur makes a profit when the spread narrows, which occurs when deal consummation appears more likely. Upon deal completion, the target's stock will be converted into stock of the acquirer based on the exchange ratio determined by the merger agreement. At this point in time, the spread will close. The arbitrageur delivers the converted stock into his short position to close his position.

=== Predictors of merger success ===
Baker and Savasoglu contend that the best single predictor of merger success is hostility: only 38% of hostile deals were successfully consummated, while so-called friendly deals boasted a success rate of 82%. Cornelli and Li contend that arbitrageurs are actually the most important element in determining the success of a merger. Since arbitrageurs have made significant financial bets that the merger will go through, it is expected that they will push for consummation. For this very reason, the probability that the merger will consummate increases as arbitrageur control increases. In their study, Cornelli and Li found that the arbitrage industry would hold as much as 30%-40% of a target's stock during the merger process. This represents a significant portion of the shares required to vote yes to deal consummation in most mergers. Thus, takeovers in which arbitrageurs bought shares had an actual success rate higher than the average probability of success implied by market prices. As a result, they can generate substantial positive returns on their portfolio positions.

=== Active vs. passive risk arbitrage ===
The arbitrageur can generate returns either actively or passively. Active arbitrageurs purchase enough stock in the target to control the outcome of the merger. These activist investors initiate sales processes or hold back support from ongoing mergers in attempts to solicit a higher bid. On the other end of the spectrum, passive arbitrageurs do not influence the outcome of the merger. One set of passive arbitrageurs invests in deals that the market expects to succeed and increases holdings if the probability of success improves. The other set of passive arbitrageurs is more involved, but passive nonetheless: these arbitrageurs are more selective with their investments, meticulously testing assumptions on the risk-reward profile of individual deals. This set of arbitrageurs will invest in deals in which they conclude that the probability of success is greater than what the spread implies. Passive arbitrageurs have more freedom in very liquid stocks: the more liquid the target stock, the better risk arbitrageurs can hide their trade. In this case, using the assumption that a higher arbitrageur presence increases the probability of consummation, the share price will not fully reflect the increased probability of success and the risk arbitrageur can buy shares and make a profit. The arbitrageur must decide whether an active role or a passive role in the merger is the more attractive option in a given situation.

== Risk-return profile ==
The risk-return profile in risk arbitrage is relatively asymmetric. There is typically a far greater downside if the deal breaks than there is upside if the deal is completed.

=== Deal-level risks ===
Risk "arbitrage" is not risk-free. Its profits materialize if the spread, which exists as a result of the risk that the merger will not be consummated at its original terms, eventually narrows. Risk arises from the possibility of deals failing to go through or not being consummated within the timeframe originally indicated. The risk arbitrageur must be aware of the risks that threaten both the original terms and the ultimate consummation of the deal. These risks include price cuts, deal extension risk and deal termination. A price cut would lower the offer value of the target's shares, and the arbitrageur could end up with a net loss even if the merger is consummated. An unexpected extension to the deal completion timeframe lowers the expected annualized return which in turn causes a decline in the stock to compensate assuming the probability of the deal completing remains constant. However, the majority of mergers and acquisitions are not revised. Therefore, the arbitrageur need only concern himself with the question of whether the deal will be consummated according to its original terms or terminated. Deal termination can occur for many reasons. These reasons may include either party's inability to satisfy conditions of the merger, a failure to obtain the requisite shareholder approval, failure to receive antitrust and other regulatory clearances, or some other event which may change the target's or the acquirer's willingness to consummate the transaction. Such possibilities put the risk in the term risk arbitrage.

Additional complications can arise on a deal-by-deal basis. An example includes collars. A collar occurs in a stock-for-stock merger, where the exchange ratio is not constant but changes with the price of the acquirer. Arbitrageurs use options-based models to value deals with collars. The exchange ratio is commonly determined by taking the average of the acquirer's closing price over a period of time (typically 10 trading days prior to close), during which time the arbitrageur would actively hedge his position in order to ensure the correct hedge ratio.

A 2010 study of 2,182 mergers between 1990 and 2007 experienced a break rate of 8.0%. A study conducted by Baker and Savasoglu, which replicated a diversified risk arbitrage portfolio containing 1,901 mergers between 1981 and 1996, experienced a break rate of 22.7%.

=== Market risk ===
Several authors find that the returns to risk arbitrage are somewhat uncorrelated to the returns of the stock market in typical market environments. However, risk arbitrage is not necessarily insensitive to the performance of the stock market in all market conditions. When the stock market experiences a decrease of 4% or more, the beta (finance) between merger arbitrage returns and risk arbitrage returns can increase to 0.5. This suggests that the exposure to market risk is asymmetric: the arbitrageur does not participate in market rallies, but tends to suffer losses in downturns.

=== Returns ===
In the long run, risk arbitrage appears to generate positive returns. Baker and Savasoglu replicated a diversified risk arbitrage portfolio containing 1,901 mergers between 1981 and 1996; the portfolio generated excess annualized returns of 9.6%. Maheswaran and Yeoh examined the risk-adjusted profitability of merger arbitrage in Australia using a sample of 193 bids from January 1991 to April 2000; the portfolio returned 0.84% to 1.20% per month. Mitchell and Pulvino used a sample of 4,750 offers between 1963 and 1998 to characterize the risk and return in risk arbitrage; the portfolio generated annualized returns of 6.2%.

The arbitrageur can face significant losses when a deal does not go through. Individual deal spreads can widen to more than fifty percent in broken deals. The HFRI Merger Arbitrage Index posted a maximum one-month loss of -6.5% but a maximum one-month gain of only 2.9% from 1990 to 2005.

Merger arbitrage is significantly constrained by transaction costs. Arbitrageurs could generate abnormally high returns using this strategy, but the frequency and high cost of trades negate much of the profit.

== Example ==
Suppose Company A is trading at $40 a share. Then Company X announces a plan to buy Company A, in which case holders of Company A's stock get $80 in cash. Then Company A's stock jumps to $70. It does not go to $80 since there is some chance the deal will not go through.

In this case, the arbitrageur can purchase shares of Company A's stock for $70. They will gain $10 if the deal is completed and lose $30 if the deal is terminated (assuming the stock returns to the pre-announcement $40 in the event of a busted deal, which may not occur). According to the market, the probability that the deal is consummated at its original terms is 75% and the probability that the deal will be terminated is 25%. Ignoring the time value of money and use of derivatives (e.g., options), the arbitrageur has three choices in regards to trading stock of Company A:

1. Buy Company A's stock at $70. They would do this if they believe the probability that the deal will close is higher than the probability offered by the market.
2. Short sell Company A's stock at $70. They would do this if they believe the probability that the deal will be terminated is higher than the probability offered by the market. Even an arbitrageur who believes the deal is still more likely than not to close, but that the market is overestimating the probability, may short with the intent of covering early. This works only if the market reprices toward their lower estimate before the close (for example, if the probability the market assigns falls to 60%, the stock would trade near $64), offering the arbitrageur an opportunity to cover their short position at a gain.
3. Do not get involved in the deal at this point in time.
