= Scott J. Freidheim =

American businessman

Scott Freidheim
- Born: 31 July 1965 (age 61); Dearborn, Michigan, United States
- Education: Northwestern University (BA); Kellogg School of Management (MA)
- Occupation: Managing Partner of Freidheim Capital
- Parent: Cyrus Freidheim
- Relatives: Stephen Freidheim Stephen Freidheim (brother)

Scott Jon Freidheim (born July 31, 1965) is an American businessman. He is the managing partner of Freidheim Capital.

== Business career ==
Freidheim began his career in investment banking in Chicago at John Nuveen & Co. In 1991, he joined Lehman Brothers’ Investment Banking Division. In 1996, he took the position of VP, Office of the Chairman for Lehman Brothers’ CEO Richard S. Fuld Jr. Since then, he held a number officer positions in each of the Investment Management, Investment Banking and Corporate divisions. Freidheim was appointed co-CAO in October 2006.

From 2014 to 2016, he was president and CEO of CDI Corporation; he was chief executive officer, Europe for Investcorp International Ltd. He also held the role of vice chairman responsible for post acquisition management of the portfolio companies in Europe.

In 2019, Freidheim Capital invested in Ettain and Freidheim became co-chairman of Ettain Group. In August 2021, Ettain Group announced that it had sold to Manpower for $925m. Freidheim Capital partnered with A&M Capital Partners to purchase Ettain Group and grow the company to become the fastest growing IT staffing company among the top 10 in the USA.

Freidheim was a member of the board of N&W Global Vending, a member of the board of Icopal, a member of the board of GL Education Group.

Prior to his role at Investcorp, Freidheim was executive vice president, president Kenmore, Craftsman & Diehard for Sears Holdings and CAO, and executive vice president of Lehman Brothers Holdings Inc.

== Non-profit involvement ==
In 2005, Scott Freidheim was named a Young Global Leader by the World Economic Forum as a leader in the field of business. Since 2006, Freidheim has participated in many panels at the World Economic Forum in Davos, Switzerland as well as at the inaugural New Champions Meeting in Dalian, China and was a member of the WEF's Global Agenda Council.

Scott Freidheim is a member of the board of directors of the United States Olympic and Paralympic Foundation; he is a former member of the Board of Trustees of the Institute of International Education (IIE), which administers the Fulbright Scholarship program, as well as the Board and Selection Committee of the IIE's Scholar Rescue Fund. He is a former member of the board of trustees of Spelman College. Freidheim is a member of The Economic Club of New York and The Council on Foreign Relations and of the Chatham House.

== Education ==
Freidheim attended Northwestern University and holds a BA in Economics from Northwestern University and an MBA from the Kellogg School of Management.

Freidheim was a Division 1 athlete playing soccer while attending Northwestern University. Upon graduation, he was Northwestern University's all time leading goal scorer.

== Involvement with Northwestern ==
Freidheim is a benefactor of Northwestern University. He is actively involved with the school and has a soccer scholarship in his name.

== Family and personal life ==
Freidheim was born in Dearborn, Michigan and was raised in Brazil and France as a child while his father led the Latin American and International practices for Booz Allen Hamilton. His father also served as CEO of Chiquita Brands International and of the Chicago Sun-Times. His brother Stephen Freidheim is a hedge fund manager who founder of Cyrus Capital in New York and co-Founded Virgin America with Richard Branson.
