= Sonita Lontoh =

American businesswoman

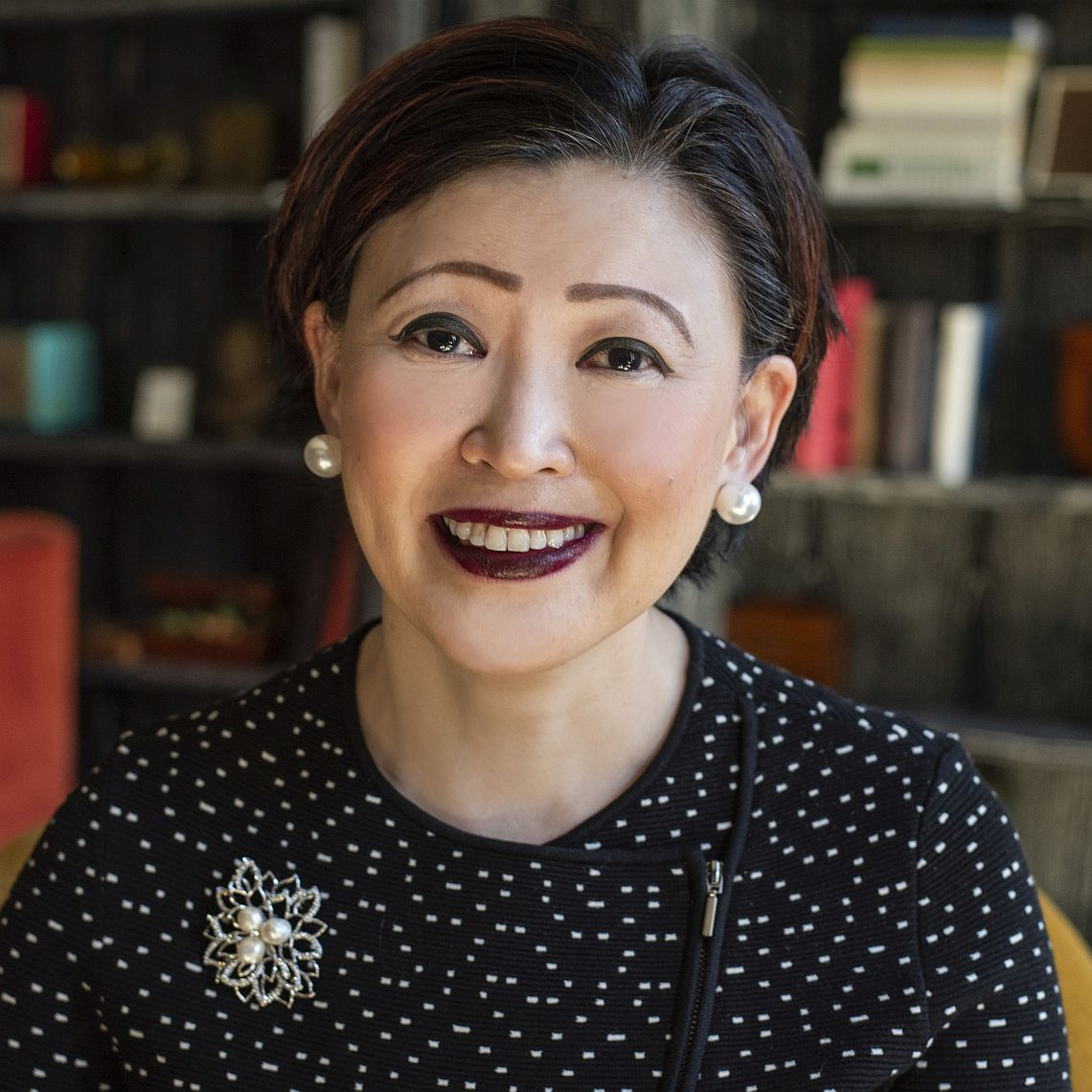
- Born: Jakarta, Indonesia
- Citizenship: U.S.
- Education: University of California, Berkeley (BS); Massachusetts Institute of Technology (MEng); Kellogg School of Management of Northwestern University (MBA)
- Occupations: Technology executive; board member
- Employers: HP Inc.; Pacific Gas and Electric Company; Siemens
- Board member of: Sunrun; TrueBlue
- Spouse: Adam Skarsgard

Sonita Lontoh is an Indonesian-born American businesswoman. She is a board member at Sunrun and TrueBlue, and former executive at HP Inc. (formerly Hewlett-Packard), Siemens, and Pacific Gas and Electric Company (PG&E).

== Early life and education ==
Lontoh was born and raised in Jakarta, Indonesia. She moved to the United States to enroll at the University of California, Berkeley, where she graduated with a Bachelor of Science degree in industrial engineering and operations research. After several years of working, she re-entered school for a Master of Engineering degree from the Massachusetts Institute of Technology and a Master of Business Administration from the Kellogg School of Management at Northwestern University.

== Career ==
In the late 1990s, Lontoh and two Berkeley classmates founded an online game company. Their original plan was to create a Greater China-focused Yahoo!, then a successful search engine in the United States, but quickly realized that online advertising was still nascent in the Chinese market. Facing this challenge, they decided to pivot to the gaming market, which their research showed was a quickly growing segment particularly among young males. This change proved successful, and they sold the company for a profit a few years later.

After a break for graduate school, Lontoh took on several roles in the energy industry. These included the Pacific Gas and Electric Company (PG&E), where she focused on green energy and renewables, Trilliant, and Siemens, where she was an executive within the new digital grid division.

After Siemens, from 2018 to 2022, Lontoh was a senior executive in HP Inc.'s Personalization, 3D Printing, and Digital Manufacturing division. In 2021, she was elected to join the board of directors of Sunrun, a renewable energy company, and the workforce solutions company TrueBlue. Lontoh serves on the industry advisory board of UC Berkeley College of Engineering's Jacobs Institute for Design Innovation. She is a member of the National Association of Corporate Directors. Additionally, Lontoh is an advisor for the venture capital firm Sway Ventures.

== Recognition ==
Lontoh has been recognized by former U.S. Secretary of State Hillary Clinton for her work as a selection committee member and mentor for the U.S. State Department's TechWomen program, and in 2012 was named a Global Emerging Leader under 40 by the National Association of Asian MBAs. She was inducted to the Asian Hall of Fame, an event recognizing the achievements of Asian Pacific Americans, in 2017. In 2020, Lontoh was among the inaugural class of inductees to the Women in Manufacturing Association's Hall of Fame. In 2021, she was among those named in technology category of Tatler Asia's list of "Most Influential" people. She was also named one of the "Most Influential Women in Bay Area Business" by San Francisco Business Times in 2023.

Lontoh was invited by the White House to speak at President Barack Obama's Global Entrepreneurship Summit and by U.S. Secretary of State John Kerry to participate in a roundtable about digital transformations. She has also been recognized by U.S. Secretary of State Hillary Clinton for her work on TechWomen.

== See also ==
- List of Kellogg School of Management alumni
- List of Massachusetts Institute of Technology alumni
- List of University of California, Berkeley alumni
