= Recreation.gov =

United States government recreation reservation website

- Website type: Travel planning and reservation service
- Available in: English
- Owner: United States federal government
- Website: www.recreation.gov (English)
- Current status: Active

Recreation.gov is the United States government's centralized online reservation system and travel planning platform. First conceived as an information sharing service in 1995, Recreation.gov is used by 9 federal agencies to offer reservation booking; an additional 5 agencies share data with the platform. Recreation.gov is developed and run by Booz Allen Hamilton, a government contractor, and managed in collaboration with a government team staffed by participating agencies.

The website allows for booking tent camping and RV sites across the United States, as well as tour tickets, timed-entry tickets, day use areas, and wilderness permits. The site has listings for 4,200 facilities and activities and over 113,000 individual reservable sites across the United States according to the website in 2021.

== Participating agencies ==
Agencies that offer reservations on Recreation.gov include:

- Bureau of Land Management
- Bureau of Reclamation
- National Archives and Records Administration
- National Park Service
- United States Fish and Wildlife Service
- United States Army Corps of Engineers
- United States Forest Service
- Naval District Washington
- Presidio Trust

Agencies that share information with Recreation.gov include:

- Bureau of Engraving and Printing
- Federal Highway Administration
- National Oceanic and Atmospheric Administration
- Smithsonian Institution
- Tennessee Valley Authority

== Governance and contract ==
The United States Forest Service has stated that the current Recreation.gov contractor operates under a competitively awarded, performance-based contract, and that the most recent contract was awarded to Booz Allen in 2016. The Forest Service has also said that reservation service fees are collected by the federal government and sent to the United States Department of the Treasury, which then reimburses the contractor pursuant to the terms of the contract, while a portion of the collected fees is distributed to the agencies that offer reservations on the system.

== Criticism ==
In 2022, the Bureau of Land Management was sued by Thomas Kotab, who argued that the fees that Recreation.gov charges violate the Federal Lands Recreation Enhancement Act. The District Court found that the fees were improperly administered due to a lack of public comment period, but the fees were not changed.

In 2023, seven plaintiffs filed a class-action against Booz Allen Hamilton in the United States District Court for the Eastern District of Virginia, alleging that BAH was charging junk fees that they deceived visitors into thinking would go toward public land management. Six months later, the plaintiffs filed a motion to voluntarily dismiss the case.

In 2023, Senators Chuck Grassley and John Barrasso sent letters to the United States Department of Agriculture and the United States Department of the Interior questioning the transparency of the Booz Allen contract and the structure of transaction fees on Recreation.gov. The senators asked how much Booz Allen had been paid to operate the platform, whether transaction-fee amounts were specified in the contract, how much the public had been charged in related fees since 2017, and what steps the departments had taken to disclose the fee structure to users.

In 2024, Senator Alex Padilla introduced the Review and Evaluation of Strategies for Equitable Reservations for Visitor Experiences (RESERVE) Federal Land Act to the Senate, which, among other things, would direct the National Academy of Sciences to "investigate the fee structure and transparency of Recreation.gov." The bill passed in December 2024 but failed in the House; it was reintroduced in the House in May 2025.

Recreation.gov has also been criticized for failing to prevent scraper bots from purchasing permits.
