= Horacio D. Rozanski =

Argentine-born American businessman (born 1968)

Horacio Rozanski
- Born: c. 1968 (age 57–58); Argentina
- Education: University of Wisconsin, Eau Claire (BBA); University of Chicago (MBA)

Horacio D. Rozanski (born c. 1968) is an Argentine-born American businessman. He is the president and chief executive officer of Booz Allen Hamilton, a technology company headquartered in McLean, Virginia.

== Early life ==
Horacio D. Rozanski was born in Argentina in 1968. In 1988, he came to the United States to attend the University of Wisconsin–Eau Claire, where he earned a bachelor of business administration degree summa cum laude. He then attended the University of Chicago Booth School of Business where he earned a master of business administration in 1992.

== Career ==
Rozanski began his career at Booz Allen Hamilton in 1991 as an intern in the Buenos Aires office. After graduating with an MBA from the University of Chicago, he joined Booz Allen's Cleveland office where he advised clients on marketing strategy. He was elected vice president in 1999, and was chief personnel officer, chief strategy and talent officer, and president and chief operating officer, before becoming CEO in 2015.

Throughout his tenure at Booz Allen, Rozanski has played a central role in major strategic initiatives that transformed the company. For example, beginning in 2012, he led “Vision 2020,” an effort that defined the company’s growth strategy for the next decade. Vision 2020 brought technology to the forefront of Booz Allen’s operations and expanded its footprint into five main areas: engineering, systems delivery, strategic innovation, commercial and international business, and cyber.

Rozanski became CEO on January 1, 2015 and has been a member of the firm’s board of directors since 2014. He is involved in all aspects of managing Booz Allen’s national and international operations and workforce, leading efforts to set the firm’s business goals and growth strategy, build value for investors, and identify emerging trends that will affect clients.

He is a member of the United States Holocaust Memorial Museum’s Committee on Conscience, the Kennedy Center Corporate Fund Board, and the Children’s National Medical Center Board of Directors.

== Personal life ==
Rozanski is married and has 2 daughters.

Rozanski is Jewish.
