= Trust-based marketing =

Trust-based marketing is a marketing theory based on building consumer relationships through trustworthy dialogue and unbiased information. The concept was originated by Dr. Glen L. Urban, professor and former dean of the MIT Sloan School of Management. Trust-based marketing focuses on customer advocacy techniques that assist consumers in making informed purchase decisions based on comprehensive marketplace options and equitable advice.

The theory contends that being honest and open is the best path to building consumer trust and creating a more loyal customer base. This is said to give customers increased consumer power through Internet access to product information and competitive pricing. Companies therefore can no longer rely on traditional models of "push marketing" in which a product's positive attributes may mask unsuitable characteristics.

For customers wanting to make an informed decision on a complex purchase, trust-based marketing is claimed to provide consumers with unbiased advice. The theory is that in competitive markets, companies need to approach their customers with respect and acknowledge that product and competitor information is easily accessible. Companies that provide consumers with comprehensive product options, including their competitors', will earn the trust of the consumer even if it does not result in an immediate sale. When impartial and candid information is presented, a consumer's loyalty towards the company increases and greater lifetime profitability per customer will be achieved.

Urban argues that "Trust-based companies have higher customer retention and more stable revenue streams. The prediction is that trust-based businesses will, in the end, have higher sales volumes and lower marketing costs than companies that survive on push-based marketing strategies." According to authors Dan Kennedy and Matt Zagula, trust-based marketing is used by Ponzi schemers such as Bernie Madoff, who was successful even though "[none] could explain exactly what Bernie did with their money or how he consistently generated above-par returns."

Urban originally tested his hypothesis with a prototype site for General Motors called TruckTown which provided unbiased comparisons of competing truck products. He found that more than 75% of TruckTown visitors said they trusted TruckTown more than the dealer who had sold them their last vehicle. Urban continued to test his theory with projects such as AutoChoiceAdvisor, a website to help car shoppers find the vehicle that best suits their needs) and a Medicare Insurance advisor called PlanPrescriber.

== See also ==
- Multi-level marketing
