= Joseph A. Swanson =

American economist

Joseph A. Swanson is visiting scholar in finance at Northwestern University's Kellogg School of Management—where he was Professor of Finance from 1975 through 1986; Adjunct Professor of Finance, 1988–2007; Clinical Professor of Finance, 2007–2014. Since 2007 he has been the board chair of Jos. Swanson & Co., a Milwaukee-based management consulting firm.

== Academic career ==
He received a B.S. (summa cum laude in Economics & History, 1964) and a Ph.D. (Economics, 1968), both from the University of Wisconsin–Madison.

He was on the faculty successively of Purdue University (1967–1969), University of Iowa (1970–1974), and Northwestern University (1975–2007). He taught courses in microeconomic theory, econometrics, time series analysis, corporate financial management, securities analysis, quantitative models of financial market performance, due diligence for mergers and acquisitions, and project finance.

His research has been focused on the themes of optimal capital accumulation, economic history of urban growth, optimal plant location, transportation cost & productivity performance, financial market efficiency with a focus on bond pricing, and auction markets. His current research is focused on applications of finance theory in private equity and project finance.

Among his major publications are Douglas W. Caves, Laurits R. Christensen, and J. A. Swanson, "Productivity Growth, Scale Economies, and Capacity Utilization in U.S. Railroads, 1955-1974," American Economic Review, 1981, 71, 994–1002.; and, with John Ledyard "The First Use of Combined-Value Auction for Transportation Services" Interfaces, 2002, 32, 4–12.

After leaving the full-time faculty of the Kellogg School of Management in 1987, he joined the Chicago Corporation where he organized a transportation research, trading and corporate finance team, specializing in the public offerings of the truckload transportation sector. In 1989 he moved to CalFed as Senior Vice President for Corporate Development, where he executed a sequence of acquisitions and divestitures that were widely noted. In 1991 Swanson resumed the CEO position at Jos. Swanson & Co.

He has served, and continues to serve on many corporate boards of directors. He is a founding director of Cargo 360 and Cheetah Software Systems. He served as a director of the Walker Group. He served a six-year term as trustee of the Evangelical Lutheran Church in America's Board of Pensions, where he chaired its audit committee and served on its investment committee. He is a former trustee (and chair of its endowment committee) of North Shore Country Day School, and the Evanston Business Investment Corp.
