= Maxim Sytch =

Organizational scholar

- Education: Kellogg School of Management, Northwestern University
- Occupations: Organizational theorist, leadership and management expert
- Scientific career
- Fields: Organization theory Economic sociology
- Workplaces: University of Michigan, Ross School of Business
- Website: http://www.maximsytch.net/

Maxim Sytch is an organizational scholar and Professor of Management and Organizations at the Ross School of Business at the University of Michigan. He is known for his work on the dynamics of knowledge and influence in interorganizational networks and in legal systems. His work has shown that small-world networks can be inherently unstable structures, how the dynamics of networks communities can sustain invention, and how organizations can influence their legal environments and judicial arbiters.

Sytch is an Associate Editor of Administrative Science Quarterly.

== Biography ==
After completing his Ph.D. at the Kellogg School of Management at Northwestern University, Sytch held appointments at the Ross School of Business at the University of Michigan as an Assistant Professor of Management and Organizations from 2009 till 2014, and as Sanford R. Robertson Assistant Professor from 2012 till 2013. In 2014, he became Michael R. and Mary Kay Hallman Fellow, and Associate Professor of Management and Organizations, and in 2021, he was appointed the Professor of Management and Organizations. Since 2018, he has been an Associate Editor of Administrative Science Quarterly.

Sytch's research has been covered by BBC, Harvard Business Review, Phys.org, Reuters, and Yahoo News

== Research ==
Sytch has conducted research on the origins and evolutionary dynamics of the dual social structure of markets that encompasses both collaborative and conflictual interorganizational relationships. His research also focuses on the roles of varying global network topologies in shaping performance consequences for entire communities of firms, and the way companies influence their legal environments by leveraging social relationships between lawyers and judicial arbiters. and how networked systems withstand shocks and recover from them.

== Awards and honors ==
- 2014 - Top 40 Business School Professors under 40 in the World, Poets and Quants
- 2014 - Ross Executive Education Teaching Impact Award, Michigan Ross
- 2014-2016 - Fellow, Michael R. and Mary Kay Hallman

== Bibliography ==
- Gulati, R., & Sytch, M. (2007). Dependence asymmetry and joint dependence in interorganizational relationships: Effects of embeddedness on a manufacturer's performance in procurement relationships. Administrative science quarterly, 52(1), 32-69.
- Gulati, R., Sytch, M., & Mehrotra, P. (2008). Breaking up is never easy: Planning for exit in a strategic alliance. California Management Review, 50(4), 147-163.
- Gulati, R., & Sytch, M. (2008). Does familiarity breed trust? Revisiting the antecedents of trust. Managerial and Decision Economics, 29(2‐3), 165-190.
- Gulati, R., Sytch, M., & Tatarynowicz, A. (2012). The rise and fall of small worlds: Exploring the dynamics of social structure. Organization Science, 23(2), 449-471.
- Sytch, M., & Tatarynowicz, A. (2014). Exploring the locus of invention: The dynamics of network communities and firms' invention productivity. Academy of Management Journal, 57(1), 249-279.
- Sytch, M., & Kim Y. (2021). Quo Vadis? From the Schoolyard to the Courtroom. Administrative Science Quarterly, 66(1), 177-219.
