= Event-driven investing =

Hedge fund investment strategy

Event-driven investing or Event-driven trading is a broad term encompassing hedge fund investment strategies that seeks to exploit pricing inefficiencies that may occur before or after an event. Examples of such events could be an earnings call, bankruptcy, merger, acquisition, or spinoff. In more recent times market practitioners have expanded this definition to include additional events such as natural disasters, regulatory changes, and actions initiated by shareholder activists. However, merger arbitrage remains the best-known investment strategy within this group.

This strategy was successfully utilized by Cornwall Capital and profiled in "The Big Short" by Michael Lewis.

== History ==
Event-driven investing "lost on average 1.4 percent in 2015" making them the poorest performers in 2015 despite a record year of mergers and acquisitions partially because funds over purchased only the largest corporate deals.

=== Healthcare sector ===
According to Dealogic, by August health care mergers and acquisitions (M&A) were up 42%, with "an all-time high of $422.8 billion;" in 2014 the high was $429.3 billion for the entire year and also set a record. New event-driven hedge funds were launched for example, New York–based Kellner had launched event-driven hedge fund, Capital with Chris Pultz and California-based Omni Partners launched event-driven investing funds such as Omni Event Fund with John Melsom as chief investment officer. Melsom noted that by 2015 there was a lot of consolidation in the healthcare sector especially in pharmaceuticals which gave "exceptionally wide spreads." President Obama's US healthcare reforms led to regulatory uncertainty in healthcare. James Elliot's Event Fund returned 34.9% from January through June 2017,

"...helped gains from drug maker Valeant Pharmaceuticals' $11 billion acquisition of specialist drug maker Salix Pharmaceuticals; AbbVie’s acquisition of cancer biotech company Pharmacyclics for $21 billion; and also the decision by US pharmacy benefit manager UnitedHealth to buy rival Catamaran for $12.8 billion."

— Hedgeweek August 2015

== Event-driven investing events ==
There are a variety of strategies that may be used to profit from different corporate events:

- Merger Arbitrage (also known as risk arbitrage)
- Convertible Arbitrage
- Distressed investing
- Spinoffs
- Regulatory changes
- Pending investigations
- Release of financial information
