= Carl L. Hamilton =

American businessman

Carl Hamilton
- Born: February 23, 1888; Dubuque, Iowa, U.S.
- Died: May 27, 1946 (aged 58); Winnetka, Illinois, U.S.
- Resting place: Graceland Cemetery, Chicago, Illinois, U.S.
- Education: University of Minnesota (B.S.)
- Occupation: Business executive
- Known for: Named partner, Booz Allen Hamilton
- Spouse: Marjorie Atwood
- Children: 2

Carl Lewis Hamilton (February 23, 1888 – May 27, 1946) was an American businessman. He is most notable for his work as a senior executive of the Weyerhaeuser wood products company and a named partner of the Booz Allen Hamilton management and information technology consulting firm.

== Biography ==
Carl Lewis Hamilton was born in Dubuque, Iowa on February 23, 1888, the son of Dr. Charles H. Hamilton and Mathilda Heberling (Lewis) Hamilton. He graduated from Dubuque High School in 1906, from the University of Minnesota with a Bachelor of Science degree in forestry in 1911. During his time in college, Hamilton worked as an agent for a West Virginia timber, land, and rock company. In the years immediately following his graduation, he was the general sales manager for a Minnesota lumber distributor, and manager for a lumber company with operations in Costa Rica.

In 1915, Hamilton joined Weyerhaeuser. Originally the general manager of the Weyerhaeuser Forest Products subsidiary, he advanced through the ranks to become vice president and general manager of the Weyerhaeuser General Timber Service Company.

Hamilton joined Booz & Fry Surveys as a partner in 1935. During World War II, Hamilton led Booz & Fry's successful effort to obtain management services work in the defense industry, including personnel management for the United States Cartridge Company in St. Louis.

Hamilton's most lasting legacy at Booz, Allen & Hamilton was the creation and implementation of the company's initial code of ethics. His effort to codify the importance of corporate integrity and fair behavior was one of the first adopted by a U.S. corporation, and became a model that many other businesses emulated.

During Hamilton's tenure, the Booz & Fry company became first Booz, Fry, Allen & Hamilton. After George Fry left the company in 1942, it became Booz, Allen & Hamilton. In the mid 1970s, the company was renamed as Booz Allen Hamilton.

== Death and burial ==
Hamilton died of a heart attack at his home in Winnetka, Illinois, on May 27, 1946. He was buried at Graceland Cemetery in Chicago.

== Family ==
Hamilton was the husband of Marjorie Atwood. They were the parents of son Charles (1917–1995) and daughter Marjorie (b. 1918), the wife of William Noble Lane (1917–1978).

== Sources ==
=== Books ===
- Lewis, Morgan Milton; Emmons, Jessie Gray Mrs. (1903). Genealogical and Biographical Record of the Lewis and Grisell Families. Coopersville, MI: DeVos Printer.
- White, James Terry (1948). The National Cyclopedia of American Biography. Vol. 34. New York, NY: J. T. White.

=== News sites ===
- "Executive Profile: Carl Hamilton". Bloomberg.com. New York, NY.

=== Internet ===
- "Meet Carl: Founding Name Partner". boozallen.com. McLean, VA: Booz Allen Hamilton.
- "List of Deals: Booz, Allen & Hamilton, Inc". Contemporary Business Archives, Lehman Brothers Collection. Cambridge, MA: Harvard Business School.
- "Carl Lewis Hamilton in the Illinois Deaths and Stillbirths Index, 1916-1947". Ancestry.com. Provo, UT: Ancestry.com, LLC. 1946.

=== Newspapers ===
- "Obituary, Carl L. Hamilton". Chicago Daily Tribune. Chicago, IL. May 29, 1946 – via Newspapers.com.
