= Chris Jurasek =

Chelsea CEO

- Born: United States
- Education: Northwestern University – Kellogg School of Management (2000–2002); Bowling Green State University (1983–1987)
- Organization: Clearlake Capital
- Known for: Former CEO of Chelsea
- Predecessor: Tom Glick

Chris Jurasek is an American venture capitalist and business executive who was most recently the CEO of English football club Chelsea. He is a senior leader with Clearlake Capital.

Jurasek was appointed as CEO of Chelsea in May 2023, succeeding Tom Glick who stepped down to pursue other opportunities. The announcement was made by the club chairman, Todd Boehly, and owners Mark Walter and Hansjörg Wyss. The announcement came a day after Chelsea appointed Mauricio Pochettino as their head coach. However, on 5 September 2024, Jurasek left his position as chief executive at Chelsea, following concerns that Jurasek became an unpopular figure among sections of staff and supporters and that his departure will not disappoint a section of Chelsea fans who were unhappy with some of the decisions made since his appointment.

Previously, Jurasek held the role of CEO at EagleView and had over 25 years of experience in leadership roles in global companies, as well as holding a number of board positions.
