= Glen L. Urban =

- Born: April 15, 1940 (age 86)
- Citizenship: American
- Education: University of Wisconsin; Northwestern University
- Scientific career
- Workplaces: MIT Sloan School of Management
- Thesis: A Quantitative Model of New Product Planning with Special Emphasis on Product Interdependency (1966)
- Website: http://glenurban.com/

Glen L. Urban (born April 15, 1940) has been a member of the MIT Sloan School of Management faculty since 1966 and dean at the school from 1993 to 1998. Urban is a leading educator, prize-winning researcher specializing in marketing and new product development, entrepreneur, and author. He is the Chairman of Sloan's MIT Center for Digital Business.

== Education ==
Trained initially in engineering and business—earning a B.S. in mechanical engineering in 1963 and an M.B.A. in 1964, both from the University of Wisconsin—Urban went on to earn a Ph.D. in marketing from the Kellogg School of Management at Northwestern University in 1966.

== Publications ==
Urban is author of Don't Just Relate - Advocate!: A Blueprint for Profit in the Era of Customer Power (2004), which launched the field of trust-based marketing. He has also published more than 30 articles on premarket forecasting of new products, test marketing, product line planning, leading-edge users in new product development, and consumer budgeting. His papers have won several prestigious awards, including two O'Dells—in 1983 and 1986—for the best papers published in marketing research in MIT Sloan Management Review.

== Businesses ==
Urban founded Experion Systems in 1999 and its PlanPrescriber.com comparison tool, as for-profit business applications based on the principle of Trust-based marketing. Experion was purchased by eHealth in May 2010.

== Recognition ==
In 1996 he received the American Marketing Association Paul D. Converse Award for outstanding contributions to the development of the science of marketing, and the Journal of Marketing award for best paper in that year. In 1999 he was winner of the American Marketing Association and The Wharton School of the University of Pennsylvania Charles Coolidge Parlin Award for recognition of a body of work in marketing research. In 2000 he presented the Wroe Alderson Lecture at the Wharton School.

He was elected to the 2010 class of Fellows of the Institute for Operations Research and the Management Sciences.
