= Francesca Cornelli =

Italian-born economist

- Born: September 19, 1962 (age 63); Milan, Italy

Academic background
- Education: Bocconi University (BEcon); Harvard University (MA, PhD)

Academic work
- Discipline: Corporate Governance; Private Equity; Privatisation; Bankruptcy; IPO; Innovation Policy
- Institutions: Kellogg School of Management
- Website: http://www.fcornelli.uk/

Francesca Cornelli (born September 19, 1962) is an economist who is Dean for Northwestern University's Kellogg School of Management.

She is known for her research in corporate governance, private equity, privatization, bankruptcy, initial public offering (IPO) and innovation policy. Most notably, in 2016 she co-created the Academic Female Finance Committee (AFFECT) which was established by the American Finance Association (AFA) to help encourage and bring more women into the field of financial research. Prior to Kellogg School, Cornelli was a Professor of Finance, Director of Private Equity and Deputy Dean of Degree Education at the London Business School. She was the first woman to be a full professor at the London Business School.

== Education ==
Cornelli completed her education in Università Commerciale Bocconi in Milan, Italy where she received her Bachelors of Economics, summa cum laude, in 1987. Thereafter, she earned a master's degree and Ph.D. in Economics from Harvard University.

== Career ==
Cornelli has held positions in various business schools; Wharton School of the University of Pennsylvania, Fuqua School of Business at Duke University, London School of Economics, Indian School of Business in Hyderabad and the New Economic School in Moscow.

=== Kellogg School of Management ===
Cornelli's term as Dean for Kellogg, where she also holds the position of Donald P. Jacobs Chair of Finance, commenced on August 1, 2019.

== Additional affiliations and memberships ==
Aside from her current positions, Cornelli is an editor of the Review of Financial Studies, and previously was on the Board of Editors of The Review of Economic Studies and as an associate editor at the Journal of Finance.

Furthermore, Cornelli is a Research Fellow of the Center for Economic and Policy Research (CEPR), a European Corporate Governance Institute (ECGI) Research Fellow and a director of the Society of Financial Intermediation. She has been a member of the Council of the European Economic Association, of the Council of the Royal Economic Society, a director of the American Finance Association and a member of the Scientific Committee of the Banque de France Foundation.

== Publications ==
=== Articles ===
==== "How to Sell a (Bankrupt) Company" (2012) ====
Co-authored with Leonardo Felli, they suggest an efficient way to sell a company in order to maximize proceeds from sales. Cornelli and Felli mentions that although companies can be sold through a completion of a stock exchange or through an initial public offering (IPO), there are other possible beneficial ways for company owners.

==== "Monitoring Managers: Does It Matter?" (2013) ====
Cornelli co-authored this article with Zbigniew Kominek and Alexander Ljungqvist. In large boards where large shareholders reside, Cornelli, Kominek and Ljungqvist discern whether if shareholders who monitor and actively engage in their business help with performance. If performance is poor, how do shareholders make the decision of whether or not to fire the CEO. Findings show that "soft" (i.e. non-verifiable) data supports shareholders decisions when firing a CEO rather than a "hard" data (i.e. verifiable). Research was based on 473 private sector firms in Central and Eastern Europe and Central Asia.

==== "The Economics of Donations and Enlightened Self-interest" (2014) ====
Cornelli co-authored this article with Andrea Buraschi to look into donations and fundraising campaigns. After findings and research, according to Cornelli and Buraschi they concluded that how the donations were going to be used, access to private events, and being in a 'network of donors' motivates individuals to donate.

== Other research ==
- Fundraising for the Arts: The Many Forms of Enlightened Self-interest (joint with Andrea Buraschi), European Financial Management, 2014, 20, pp. 1–32.
- Monitoring Managers: Does it Matter? (joint with Zbigniew Kominek and Alexander Ljungqvist), Journal of Finance, 68, 431-481.
- How to Sell a (Bankrupt) Company (joint with L. Felli), International Review of Finance, 2012, 12, pp. 197–226.
- Corporate Governance and Private Equity: do LBOs have better boards? (joint with Oguzhan Karakas), in "Globalization of Alternative Investments", World Economic Forum Working paper, The Global Economic Impact of Private Equity Report 2008.
- Private Equity, Chapter 5 of EBRD Transition Report 2006, 2006, pp. 70–80, London, EBRD.
- Investor Sentiment and Pre-IPOs Markets (joint with David Goldreich and Alexander Ljungqvist), The Journal of Finance, 2006, vol.61, pp 1187–1216.
- Bookbuilding: How Informative is the Order Book? (joint with David Goldreich), The Journal of Finance, 2003, vol. 58, pp. 1415–44.
- Stage Financing and the Role of Convertible Securities (joint with Oved Yosha), The Review of Economic Studies, 2003, vol.70, No. 1, pp. 1–32.
- Risk Arbitrage in Takeovers (joint with David D. Li), The Review of Financial Studies, 2002, vol.15, No.3, pp. 837–68.
- Book-building and Strategic Allocation (joint with D. Goldreich), The Journal of Finance, 2001, vol.56, No.6, December, pp. 2337–70.
- Patents Renewals and R&D Incentives (joint with Mark Schankerman), RAND Journal of
- Economics, 1999, vol. 30, No. 2, Summer, pp. 197–213.
- The Capital Structure of Firms in Central and Eastern Europe (joint with Richard Portes and Mark Schaer), in Dierent Paths to a Market Economy: China and European Economies in Transition O. Bouin, F. Coricelli and F. Lemoine (eds.), 1998, CEPR/CEPII/OECD.
- Large Shareholders, Control Benets and Optimal Schemes for Privatization (joint with David D. Li), RAND Journal of Economics, 1997, vol. 28, No. 4, Winter, pp. 585–604.
- Ex-ante Eciency of Bankruptcy Procedures (joint with L. Felli), European Economic Review, 1997, vol.14, April, pp. 475–485.
- Optimal Selling Procedures with Fixed Costs, Journal of Economic Theory, 1996, vol.71, n.1, pp. 1–30.
- The Theory of Bankruptcy and Mechanism Design (joint with L. Felli) in Crisis, What Crisis? Orderly Workouts for Sovereign Debtors, B. Eichengreen and R. Portes (eds.), London: CEPR, 1995.
- Privatization in Eastern Europe: the sale of shares to foreign companies, in The Economics of Transformation: Theory and Practice in the New Market Economies, Alfred Schipke and Alan M. Taylor (eds.), Berlin: Springer, 1993.
