= Gestor =

A gestor is person who works in a gestoría, in Spain or Mexico, and deals with administrative bureaucracy on behalf of a client, for a fee. In Spain they are not required to be a licensed attorney. In Spain, gestors are listed in the Páginas Amarillas (the yellow pages) as "gestorias".

A gestor is a professional who specializes in handling administrative, bureaucratic, or legal processes on behalf of individuals or companies. Their role combines technical knowledge, organizational skills, and experience in navigating complex government systems to save time and ensure accuracy in procedures such as registering a birth, filing taxes, importing a vehicle, or obtaining permits.

In many Spanish-speaking countries, the figure of the gestor is essential due to the complexity of administrative systems that often require specialized knowledge to avoid delays or errors.

== See also ==
- Consultant
- Red tape
- Service bureau
