= Peter Block =

American author, consultant and speaker

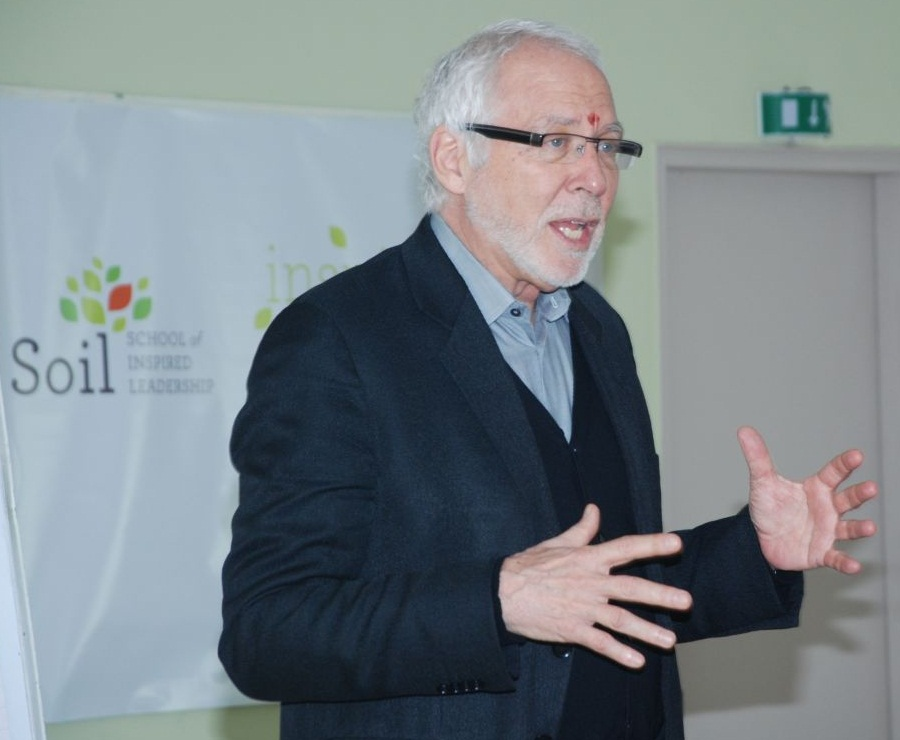
Block in 2010

Peter Block (born 1939) is an American author, consultant, and speaker in the areas of organization development, community building, and civic engagement.

He was born to Jewish parents, Ira and Dorothy Block. He currently resides with his wife, Cathy Kramer, in Cincinnati, Ohio.

== Education and career ==
Peter Block completed his undergraduate studies in industrial management at the University of Kansas in 1961 and obtained a master's degree in industrial administration from Yale University in 1963. He started his career as an organizational consultant in 1963 in the information service department at Esso (today ExxonMobil). In the early 1970s Peter co-founded the consulting firm "Block Petrella Weisbord" with Tony Petrella and Marvin Weisbord. He is also founder of The School for Managing of the Association for Quality and Participation as well as the training company Designed Learning. Block serves on the board of directors of Cincinnati Classical Public Radio, the advisory board for The Festival in the Workplace Institute as well as the Board of Elementz Hip Hop Center in Cincinnati. Together with other volunteers, Block started A Small Group, that aims to facilitate discourse towards a new community narrative as underscored by Block's work on civic engagement. PR Newswire reported that Peter Block joined LivePerson Inc's board of directors.

== Recognition and awards ==
Peter Block is the recipient of the Organization Development Network's 2008 Lifetime Achievement Award. In 2004 he received their first place Members' Choice Award in recognition of his book, Flawless Consulting: A Guide to Getting Your Expertise Used (1999) as the most influential book for Organizational Development practitioners over the past 40 years. Among other national awards, Block also received the American Society for Training and Development Award for Distinguished Contributions, the Association for Quality and Participation President's Award, and he was entered into Training Magazine's HRD Hall of Fame.

== Work and ideas ==
Block's work generally focuses on alternatives to patriarchal beliefs pervasive in Western culture and his ideas suggest that cultural change can be brought about through consent and connectedness as opposed through mandate and force. Peter contends that cultural change is only possible when it is preceded by relationship and connectedness among its members. Peter is the author and co-author of several books (see Selected Bibliography below). Among his more recent work, The Abundant Community: Awakening the Power of Families and Neighborhoods (2010), co-authored with John McKnight, emeritus professor of Education and Social Policy at Northwestern University, is a culmination of Block's work on community and the cultural change needed for the creation of a more sustainable future.

=== Culture and community ===
Regarding the changing of cultural beliefs, Block argues that a "culture of accountability" is needed and feasible if attention is diverted away from leaders and refocused on citizens with a commitment towards the creation of a deeper sense of community and citizenship. Block's conceptualization of community is more complex, but he generally connects the term with reality outside of systems and institutions. He also uses the term in reference to an aggregation of people or neighborhoods that have something in common. Block builds on Robert D. Putnam's ideas around the practical importance inherent in a "sense of community". As Block explains, a community's well-being relies on the quality of the relationships and the cohesion that exists among its citizens, known as a community's "social capital".

Ultimately, Block challenges communities and their leaders to transform the isolation, fear, and self-interest prevalent in Western culture into connectedness and caring for the whole by starting with accountability and generosity amongst its members. This is his notion of the "ideal world" where accountability is abundant, commitment is authentic, and a community consciousness is prevalent throughout the global village.

=== Citizenship and consumerism ===
Block's notion of a citizen is someone accountable and committed to the well-being of the whole and a participant in a democracy, regardless of their legal status. Peter stated that a citizen is "one who chooses to create the life, the neighborhood, the world from their own gifts and the gifts of others". Block's points to a paradox: in the realization of citizenship today, many who have full citizenship rights wait for others to contribute to their lives and yet themselves contribute little to democracy or the well-being of their communities. Others without citizenship rights are sometimes major contributors to community and democracy. Nevertheless, Block generally attributes citizenship to those functioning as full participants in a democracy.

Block's conceptualization of a "consumer" might be regarded as more contentious. In his words, "a consumer is one who has surrendered to others the power to provide what is essential for a full and satisfied life" and he goes as far as saying, "Consumerism is not about shopping, but about the transformation of citizens into consumers". Moreover, Peter believes there is a growing movement of people who believe that a full and satisfied life is obtained within their communities rather than in the market place.

=== Stewardship and service ===
Block conceives of "stewardship" as an umbrella term that encapsulates the means towards the achievement of fundamental change in the manner in which we govern institutions. His conceptualization of "service" is more complex. He argues that service is realized in both the "language of service" and the "experience of service". He argues, the problem is that we have the language of service but lack the experience of it. He attributes this lack to self-interest present in people as well as in institutions. He believes service is only truly realized when it is "authentic" and when the following characteristics are present: there is a balance of power, the primary commitment is to the larger community, and there is a balanced and equitable distribution of rewards.

Block argues that these notions of stewardship and service are not characteristic of how organizations are currently being run. He explains that although these notions are reflective of individuals' intentions towards governing, they are not reflective of the reality. Block is a supporter, with others like Margaret Wheatley, Max DePree, and James Autry, of the basic premise inherent in "servant-leadership" implying that leaders should put the needs of followers ahead of their own needs.

== Notable undertakings ==
In collaboration with Werner H. Erhard, Peter Block designed courses and trained clergy and grassroots leaders in transformation skills and perspectives in leadership and integrity to effect peace and reconciliation in the Northern Ireland Peace Process.

== Selected bibliography ==
=== Books ===
- Activating the Common Good: Reclaiming Control Of Our Collective Well-Being (2023), Penguin Random House; ISBN 9781523005963.
- Community: The Structure of Belonging, 2nd Edition (2018), Berrett-Koehler Publishers; ISBN 9781523095568.
- Stewardship: Choosing Service Over Self Interest, 2nd Edition (2013), Berrett-Koehler Publishers; ISBN 9781609948221.
- The Answer to How Is Yes: Acting on What Matters (2003), Berrett-Koehler Publishers; ISBN 9781576752715.
- Flawless Consulting Fieldbook & Companion: A Guide to Understanding Your Expertise (2000), ISBN 978-0-7879-4804-7.
- Flawless Consulting: A Guide to Getting Your Expertise Used (1999), ISBN 978-0-7879-4803-0.
- The Empowered Manager: Positive Political Skills at Work (1991), ISBN 978-1-55542-265-3.

=== Co-authored books ===
- The Abundant Community: Awakening the Power of Families and Neighborhoods (with John McKnight 2012), Berrett-Koehler Publishers; ISBN 9781609940812.
- Freedom and Accountability at Work: Applying Philosophic Insight to the Real World (2001), ISBN 0-7879-5594-9.
- The Age of Participation: New Governance for the Workplace and the World (with Patricia McLagan and Christo Nel, 1995), Berrett-Koehler Publishers; ISBN 9781881052562.

=== Articles ===
- "Rediscovering Service: Weaning Higher Education from Its Factory Mentality" in Educational Record, 76(4):6–13
- "Servant Leadership: Creating An Alternative Future" in The International Journal of Servant-Leadership, 2 (May 2006):55–79
