= Donald Jacobs =

American economist (1927–2017)

Donald Jacobs (June 22, 1927 – October 30, 2017) was an American academic administrator who was dean of Kellogg School of Management, Northwestern University from 1975 to 2001.

== Early life ==
Jacobs was born in the west side of Chicago, and attended Austin High School.

== Education ==
Jacobs graduated with a BA in economics from Roosevelt University in 1949. Subsequently, he obtained an MA in economics from Columbia University (1951) and a Ph.D. in economics from Columbia University in 1956.

== Career ==
=== Kellogg School of Management ===
At Kellogg School of Management, Jacobs was a faculty member from 1957 to 2017 and taught finance, including international finance and corporate governance. He served as a dean at the Kellogg school for 26 years from 1975 to 2001, during which time he led the school to become one of the top business schools in the world. He had been a Dean Emeritus of the school since 2001.

== Personal life ==
Jacobs died at Evanston Hospital on October 30, 2017, at the age of 90.
