= Alan Weiss (entrepreneur) =

American writer

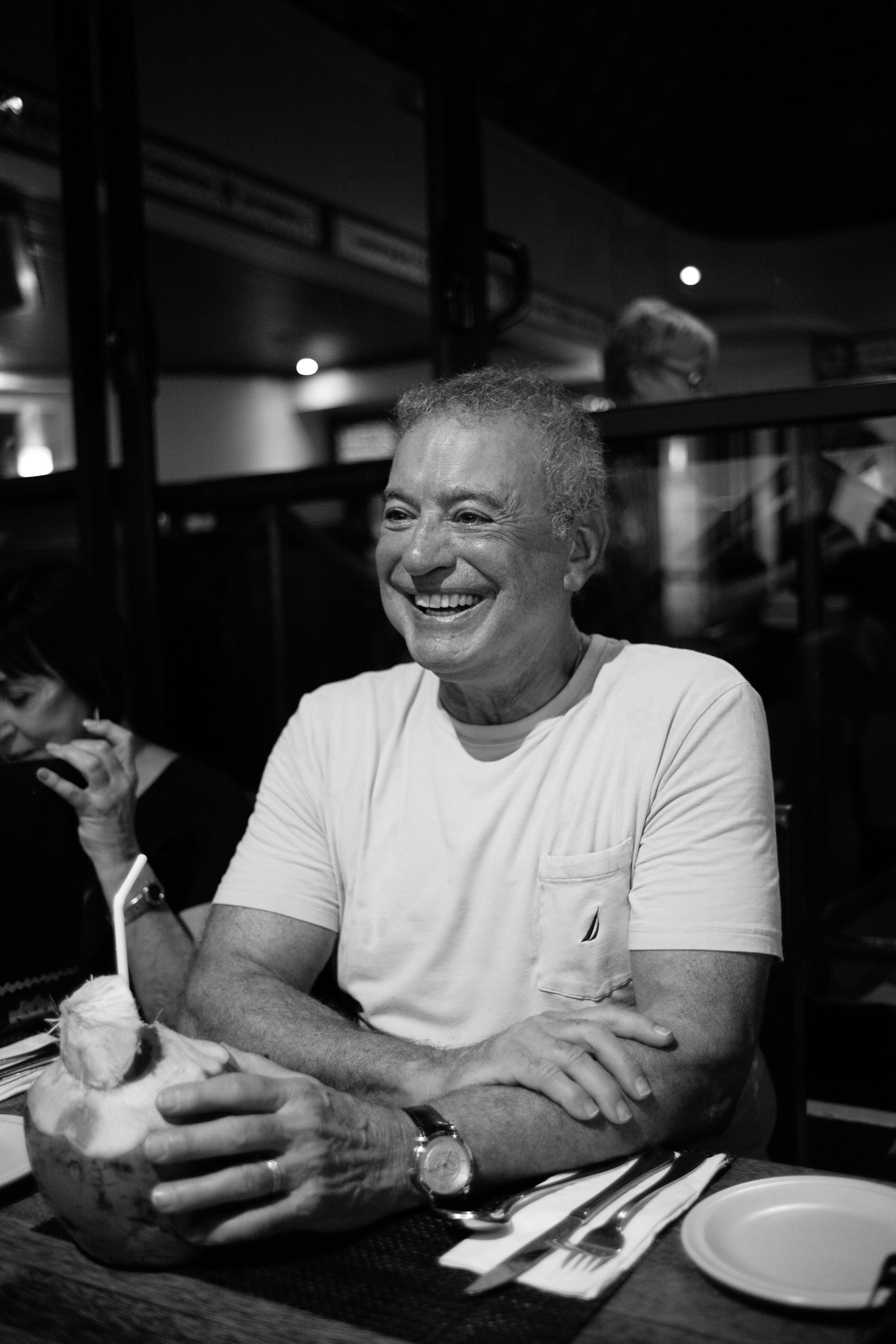
- Self-portrait photograph
- Born: March 3, 1946 (age 80); Union City, New Jersey, USA
- Education: Rutgers University; Montclair University
- Occupations: Consultant, entrepreneur, speaker, author
- Website: alanweiss.com

Alan Weiss (born 1946) is an American entrepreneur, author, and public speaker.

== Early life ==
Alan Weiss was born in Union City, New Jersey in 1946. He spent his childhood in Union City, New Jersey, and graduated from Emerson High School in 1964. He received degrees in political science from Rutgers University, where he was elected to the National Political Science Association Honor Society, and from Montclair State University. He was an award-winning editor-in-chief at Rutgers' newspaper, The Observer, winning eight awards including first place in editorial writing in the New Jersey Collegiate Press Association competition.

Weiss joined Prudential Insurance in 1968 and was recruited by the Princeton consulting firm, Kepner-Tregoe, in 1972. In his 11-year career with the consulting firm, he went on to run the Asian, Latin American, and North American Divisions. He was recruited in 1983 to become president of Walter V. Clarke Associates, a behavioral consulting firm in Providence, Rhode Island.

== Business ventures ==
Weiss formed the Summit Consulting Group, Inc. in 1985, specializing in human and organizational performance. Clients for the consulting group include Merck, Hewlett-Packard, JP Morgan Chase, Bank of America, Allianz Insurance, The New York Times Company, Mercedes-Benz and Toyota. Additionally, Weiss launched a professional speaking career that has taken him to 60 countries.

Weiss has held a position as an adjunct professor at the University of Rhode Island on strategy and consulting, and has been a visiting lecturer at Georgia University's Graduate School of Business, Case Western Reserve, Boston College, Tufts, the Institute of Management Studies, and the University of Illinois.

== Honors and awards ==
Weiss has received the Lifetime Achievement Award from the American Press Institute, one of only seven people in their history and the sole non-journalist honored.

The Institute of Management Consultants has recognized him as a Certified Management Consultant and has named him a Fellow of the Institute.

The National Speakers Association has recognized him as a Certified Speaking Professional (CSP) and has elected him to their Speakers Hall of Fame, making him one of only two people in history to be honored by both the IMC as a Fellow and NSA as a Hall of Fame member.

Weiss has a non-traditional PhD in Organizational Psychology from California Coast University.

He has served as Chair of the Newport International Film Festival, and on the boards of Trinity Repertory Company, Festival Ballet, and Harvard University's Center for Mental Health and the Media.

He is a recipient of the Axiom Award for excellence in audio presentation.

== Publishing ==
As of April 2017, Weiss has published 64 books on consulting. His books have appeared on the curricula of the Wharton School of Business, Temple University, and Villanova University.

His best-seller, Million Dollar Consulting (McGraw-Hill) has been through five editions over 25 years. His books currently appear in 12 languages.

=== Bibliography ===
- Weiss, Alan (1988). The Innovation Formula: How Organizations Turn Change Into Opportunity (with Michael Robert). Ballinger. ISBN 0-88730-352-8.
- Weiss, Alan (1989). Managing for Peak Performance: A Guide to the Power (and Pitfalls) of Personal Style. Harper Business. ISBN 0-88730-463-X.
- Weiss, Alan (1992). Million Dollar Consulting: The Professional Guide to Growing a Practice. McGraw-Hill. ISBN 1-25958-861-0.
- Weiss, Alan (1994). Best Laid Plans: Turning Strategy into Action Throughout Your Organization. Macalester Park Pub Co. ISBN 0-91092-498-8.
- Weiss, Alan (1995). Our Emperors Have No Clothes. Career PR Inc. ISBN 1-56414-177-2.
- Weiss, Alan (1997). Money Talks. McGraw-Hill. ISBN 0-07069-615-2.
- Weiss, Alan (2000). Good Enough Isn't Enough: Nine Challenges for Companies That Choose to Be Great. AMACOM. ISBN 0-81440-505-3.
- Weiss, Alan (2000). How to Market, Establish a Brand, and Sell Professional Services. Kennedy Information. ISBN 1-885922-68-X.
- Weiss, Alan (2000). Getting Started in Consulting. Wiley. ISBN 0-47041-980-6.
- Weiss, Alan (2000). The Great Big Book of Process Visuals: Give Me a Double Axis Chart and I Can Rule the World. Las Brisas Research Press. ISBN 1-92861-104-4.
- Weiss, Alan (2000). The Unofficial Guide to Power Managing. Wiley. ISBN 0-02863-749-6.
- Weiss, Alan (2001). How to Establish a Unique Brand in the Consulting Profession: Powerful Techniques for the Successful Practitioner. Pfeiffer. ISBN 0-47043-394-9.
- Weiss, Alan (2001). The Ultimate Consultant: Powerful Techniques for the Successful Practitioner. Pfeiffer. ISBN 0-78795-508-6.
- Weiss, Alan (2002). Great Consulting Challenges: And How to Surmount Them. Pfeiffer. ISBN 0-78795-510-8.
- Weiss, Alan (2002). How To Sell New Business And Expand Existing Business: The Practitioner's Guide to Rainmaking for Professional Service Firms. Kennedy Information. ISBN 1-88592-288-4.
- Weiss, Alan (2002). Process Consulting: How to Launch, Implement, and Conclude Successful Consulting Projects. Pfeiffer. ISBN 1-11842-682-7.
- Weiss, Alan (2003). Organizational Consulting: How to Be an Effective Internal Change Agent. Wiley. ISBN 0-47126-378-8.
- Weiss, Alan (2003). Life Balance: How to Convert Professional Success into Personal Happiness. Pfeiffer. ISBN 0-78795-509-4.
- Weiss, Alan (2005). Million Dollar Consulting Toolkit: Step-by-Step Guidance, Checklists, Templates, and Samples from The Million Dollar Consultant. Wiley. ISBN 0-47174-027-6.
- Weiss, Alan (2007). The Son of the Great Big Book of Process Visuals. Las Brisas Research Press. ISBN 978-1-92861-113-4.
- Weiss, Alan (2008). Value-Based Fees: How to Charge - and Get - What You're Worth. Pfeiffer. ISBN 978-0-47027-584-9.
- Weiss, Alan (2008). The Global Consultant: How to Make Seven Figures Across Borders (with Omar Khan). Wiley. ISBN 978-0-47082-386-6.
- Weiss, Alan (2009). The Talent Advantage: How to Attract and Retain the Best and the Brightest (with Nancy MacKay). Wiley. ISBN 978-0-47045-056-7.
- Weiss, Alan (2009). The Power of Strategic Commitment: Achieving Extraordinary Results Through Total Alignment and Engagement (with Josh Leibner and Gershon Mader). AMACOM. ISBN 978-0-81441-374-6.
- Weiss, Alan (2010). Million Dollar Speaking: The Professional's Guide to Building Your Platform. McGraw-Hill. ISBN 978-0-07174-380-8.
- Weiss, Alan (2010). Thrive!. Summit Consulting Group. ISBN 978-1-92861-115-8.
- Weiss, Alan (2011). The Consulting Bible: Everything You Need to Know to Create and Expand a Seven-Figure Consulting Practice. Weiss. ISBN 978-0-47092-808-0.
- Weiss, Alan (2011). Million Dollar Coaching: Build a World-Class Practice by Helping Others Succeed (Business Skills and Development). McGraw-Hill. ISBN 978-0-07174-379-2.
- Weiss, Alan (2011). Million Dollar Consulting Proposals: How to Write a Proposal That's Accepted Every Time. Wiley. ISBN 978-1-11809-753-3.
- Weiss, Alan (2011). Million Dollar Referrals: The Secrets to Building a Perpetual Client List to Generate a Seven-Figure Income. McGraw-Hill. ISBN 978-0-07176-927-3.
- Weiss, Alan (2012). Million Dollar Web Presence: Leverage The Web to Build Your Brand and Transform Your Business. Entrepreneur Press. ISBN 978-1-61308-171-6.
- Weiss, Alan (2013). Alan Weiss on Consulting. Great Life Press. ISBN 978-1-93839-405-8.
- Weiss, Alan (2013). Who's Got Your Back: How to Design, Implement, Evaluate and Improve Your Business by Measuring and Engaging Human Performance (with Omar Khan). Global Professional Publishing. ISBN 978-1-90640-374-4.
- Weiss, Alan (2014). Million Dollar Launch: How to Kick-start a Successful Consulting Practice in 90 Days. McGraw-Hill. ISBN 978-0-07182-634-1.
- Weiss, Alan (2015). The Business Wealth Builders: Accelerating Business Growth, Maximizing Profits, and Creating Wealth (with Phil Symchych). Business Expert Press. ISBN 978-1-63157-290-6.
- Weiss, Alan (2015). The Language of Success: the Confidence and Ability to Say What You Mean and Mean What You Say in Business and Life (with Kim Wilkerson). Business Expert Press. ISBN 978-1-63157-300-2.
- Weiss, Alan (2016). Million Dollar Maverick: Forge Your Own Path to Think Differently, Act Decisively, and Succeed Quickly. Routledge. ISBN 978-1-62956-126-4.
- Weiss, Alan (2016). The Resilience Advantage: Stop Managing Stress and Find Your Resilience (with Richard Citrin). Business Expert Press. ISBN 978-1-63157-373-6.
- Weiss, Alan (2017). Lifestorming: Creating Meaning and Achievement in Your Career and Life (with Marshall Goldsmith). Wiley. ISBN 978-1-11936-612-6.
