= Market-entry consultant =

Market-entry consultants provide consultancy services to private companies, corporations or government / non-profit organizations for solving various business problems related to commencing sales/manufacturing/outsourcing operations in a new market / geographical territory. This includes, but is not limited to services like:

- Consulting an organization about suitability / demand of their products or services in the new market / geography of interest.
- Market potential, growth, competition, market-share analysis and other market research activities.
- Preparation of business strategy, business plan; carrying out cost–benefit and risk analysis for the organization etc.

It is common for trade associations / diplomatic missions of heavily export oriented countries to provide market-entry consultancy services to companies / organizations (belonging to their origin country) from their global offices.

== See also ==
- Market-entry strategy
