= Faculty consulting =

Consulting by faculty members is the use of scholarly expertise for the benefit of organizations outside the scholarly community through friendship, volunteering or in return for some sort of compensation.

== Overview ==
Universities have widely varying policies on faculty consulting, generally limiting the proportion of a faculty member's time, which may be spent on consulting, and instituting rules to avoid conflicts of interest.

Consulting is distinguished from activities, which are scholarly or creative, from public service, and from outside activities which are unrelated to the area of scholarly expertise. For instance, a professor of history who designs sailboats on the side is not considered to be consulting, although a professor of engineering might be.

== Sources ==
- Aggarwal, Raj, "Faculty Members as Consultants: A Policy Perspective", Journal of the College and University Personnel Association, v. 32 n. 2 p. 17-20, Summer 1981.
- Patton, Carl V. "Consulting by Faculty Members", Bulletin of the AAUP, v. 66 n. 4 p. 181-85, May 1980.
- Reis, Richard M. "When Faculty Consulting Helps -- and When It Hurts -- Your Career", The Chronicle of Higher Education, October 22, 1999, retrieved on September 24, 2011.
- UC Berkeley guide to consulting for faculty and academic employees, Policy & Guidelines, Sept. 19, 2006, retrieved on September 9, 2007.
