= James L. Allen =

American businessman (1904–1992)

James Lane Allen
- Born: November 21, 1904; Somerset, Kentucky
- Died: November 5, 1992 (aged 87); Gulf Stream, Florida
- Education: Northwestern University
- Occupations: businessman, corporate executive
- Known for: founding Booz Allen & Hamilton
- Spouse: Frances Allen
- Children: 3

James Lane Allen (November 21, 1904 – November 5, 1992) was an American businessman who was one of the founders of the management consulting firms Booz Allen Hamilton and Strategy&, a division of PricewaterhouseCoopers.

== Biography ==
Allen was born November 21, 1904, on a farm in Somerset, Kentucky. He spent his boyhood in Somerset, was educated in public schools, and graduated from Somerset High School in 1921.

He attended business college and in 1922 moved to Chicago where he worked at several jobs and attended night school. Allen graduated from Northwestern University in 1929 with a B.S. degree in Economics from the Kellogg School of Management. Kellogg's James L. Allen Center for executive education is named for him.

Allen joined Edwin G. Booz Surveys in 1929 and was named a partner in 1936. Subsequently, the firm's name was changed to Booz Allen Hamilton. Allen led the firm from 1944 to 1970, a time of rapid growth in partners, staff, and office locations as well as diversification in services. He headed the firm as chairman of the executive committee and later, after incorporation, as chairman of the board. In 1970, he was named honorary chairman. He died in 1992 in Gulf Stream, Florida.
