= Sonita kingdom =

Sonita was the country of Asura king Bana or Vana. His daughter Usha married Vasudeva Krishna's grandson Aniruddha.

== References in Mahabharata ==
The link between Sonita kingdom and its king Bana is made clearer in the Bhagavata Purana

King Bana of Sonita is mentioned as follows: Vasudeva Krishna hath slain Jarasandha, and Vakra, and Shishupala of mighty energy, and Bana in battle, and numerous other kings also have been slain by him (5:130). At (5:64) Krishna is again mentioned as the slayer of Vana and Bhumi's son Naraka (of Pragjyotisha kingdom). At (9:46) Bana is mentioned as the son of Bali. (Diti (Matriarch) > Hiranyakasipu > Prahlada > Virochana > Bali > Bana (1:65).

== See also ==
- Kingdoms of Ancient India
