= Service bureau =

Company that provides business services for a fee

A service bureau is a company that provides business services for a fee. The term has been extensively used to describe technology-based services to financial services companies, particularly banks. Service bureaus are a significant sector within the growing 3D printing industry that allow customers to make a decision whether to buy their own equipment or outsource production. Customers of service bureaus typically do not have the scale or expertise to incorporate these services into their internal operations and prefer to outsource them to a service bureau. Outsourced payroll services constitute a commonly provisioned service from a service bureau.

== The business model question ==
One writer described the ideal service bureau customer as only needing vanilla: very little customization per customer. The phrasing is catering "to the bell curve of customer requirements." If strawberry banana is needed, it is important to ask:

Did they develop their own platform or license or purchase it?

To its customers, a service bureau offers a combination of expertise in technology, process and business-domains. The bureau business model depends on the ability to productize services and deploy them in volume to a large customer base. In the modern context, technology often becomes a key enabler to achieving this scale.

== Histories ==
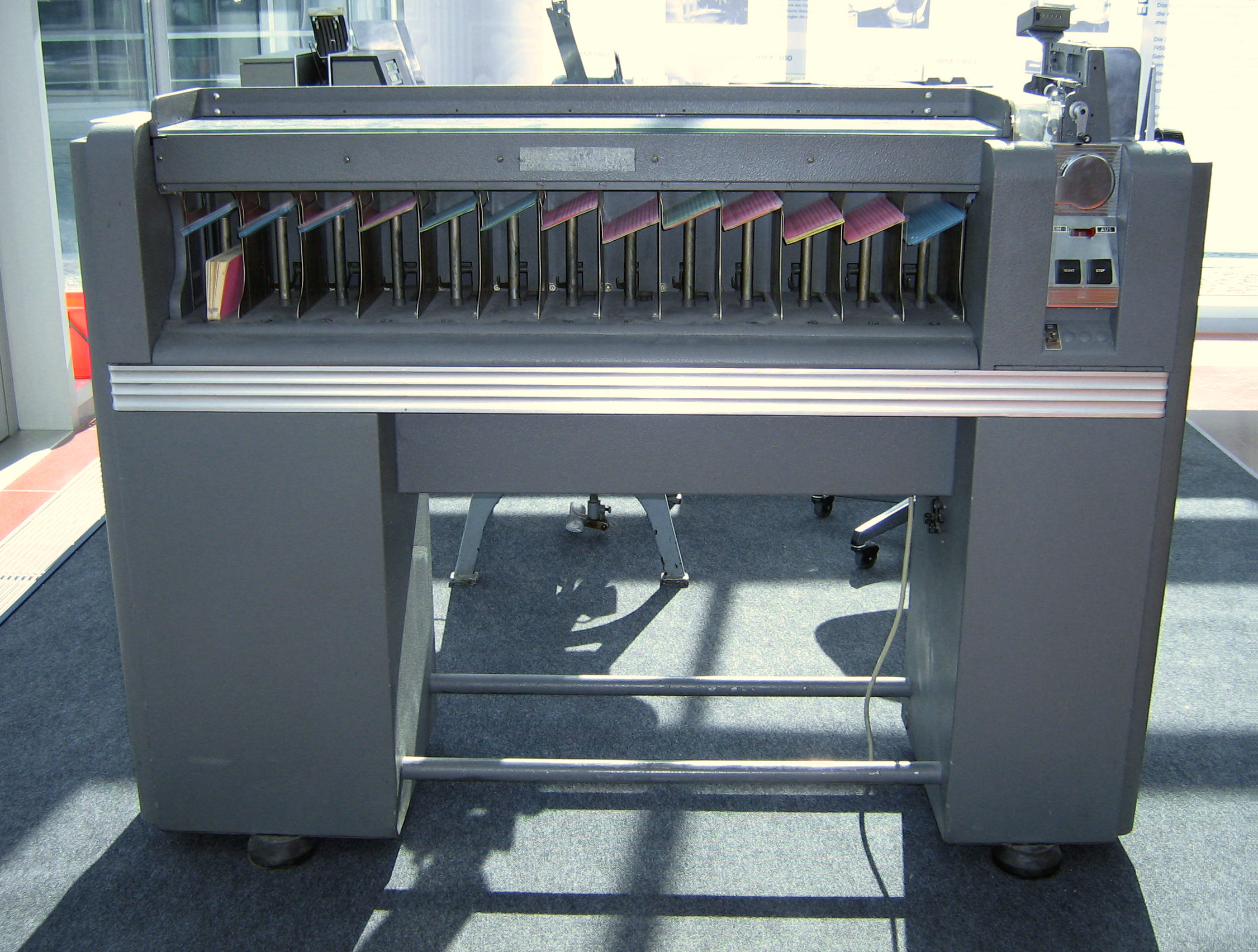
IBM 082 card sorter

Data processing service bureaus were opened by IBM in 1932, first just in major USA cities, then internationally. The purpose was to provide access to then-state-of-the-art Tab Equipment rather than own basis.

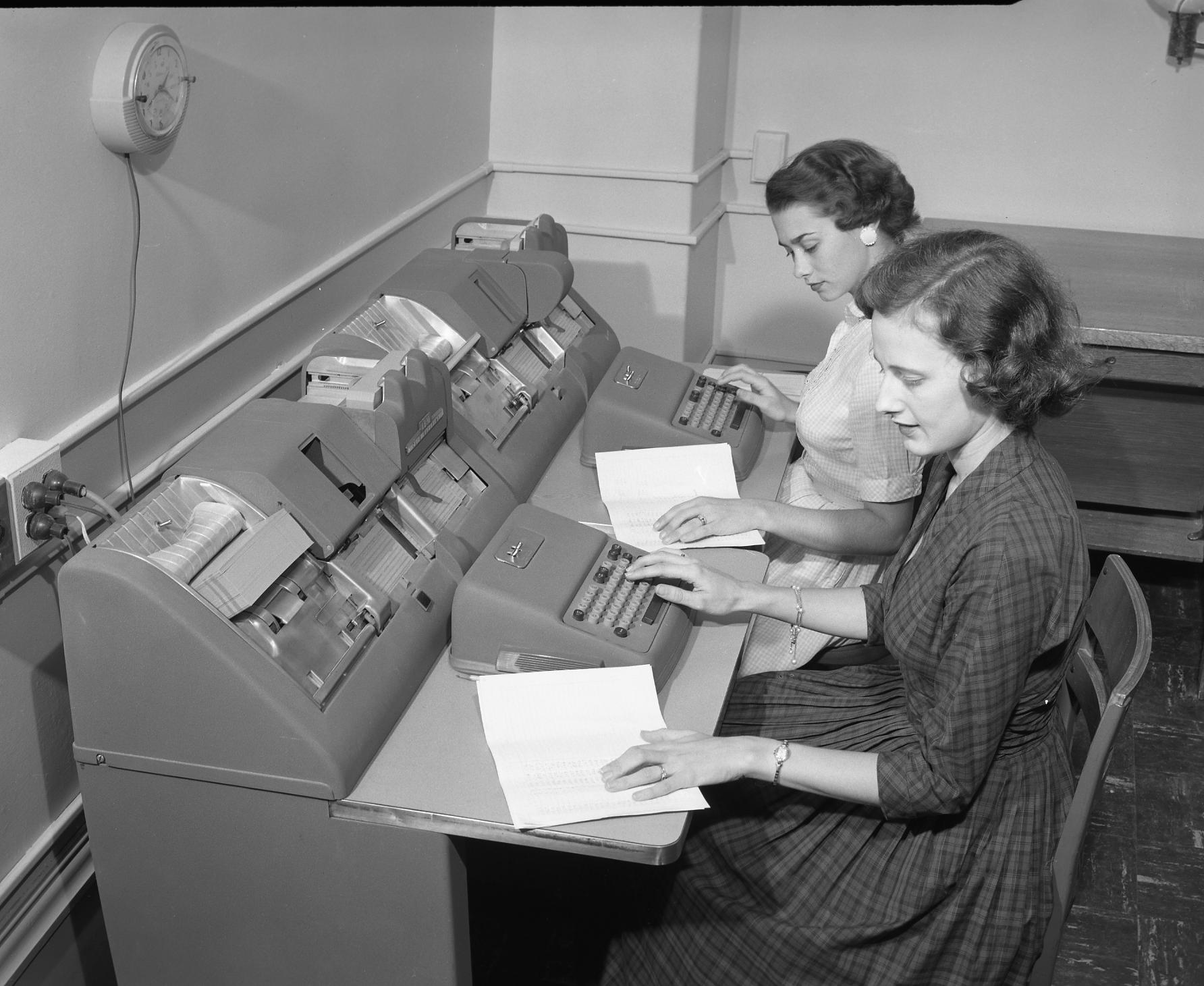
Keypunching at Texas A&M

Keypunching (a term that long-preceded "data entry") was often part of what was offered.

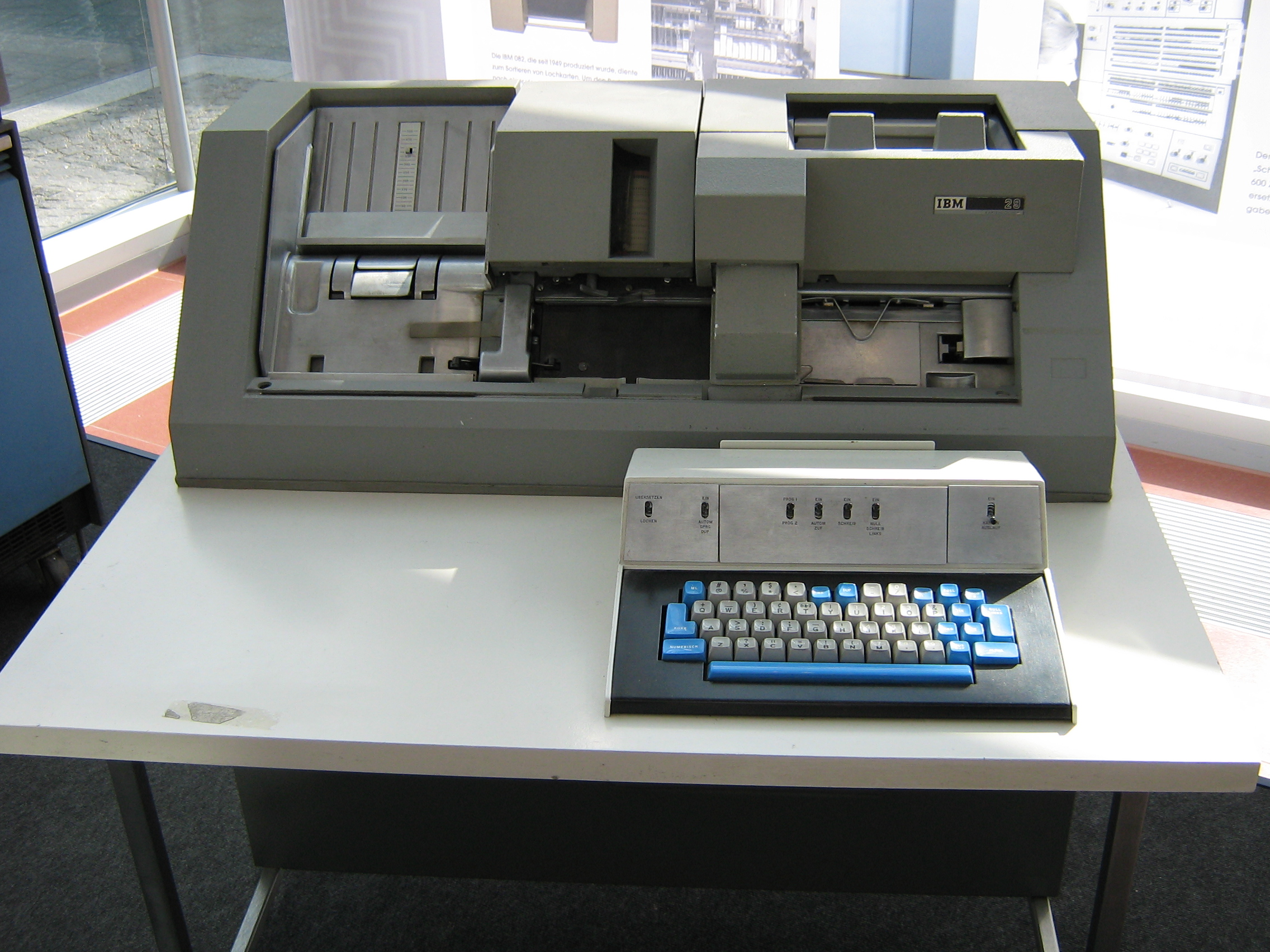
IBM 029 Keypunch machine

As Batch processing systems replaced Tab Equipment, service bureaus, from the mid 1950s, could offer this too.

A few decades later, sharing of mainframes via Timesharing was a step forward.

These concepts already existed - advertising and Ad agencies. Initially newspapers sold space in bulk to print space brokers; they resold the space, but individual customers made their own ads. Subsequently, the concept of having someone else write your ad took over.

=== Some service bureau functions ===
- Management of a national survey of corporate catering (300,000 questionnaires)
- A specialized service bureau might be good at doing direct mail, perhaps just for a single target.

Founded in 1866 as an Ohio business forms printer, in 1927 they began to specialize as printers of accounting forms for car dealers. In the 1960s they added dealership computer services.

=== Landart: a more detailed example ===
Although Landart Systems, Inc (LSI) opened in 1973 as a DECsystem-20-based timesharing bureau that also did computerized typesetting, it was the 1977 introduction of the Xerox 9700 high-end laser printer which was Landart's subsequent mark of distinction.

The 9700 could accept input via direct computer link or from magnetic tape, thus allowing the next step: a service they called Laserlink.

Founded by John Gilmour, a data processing manager whose Wall Street employer folded, the initial goal was to have the various services needed to perform typesetting, financial computer graphics, word processing and general timesharing under one roof.

Laserlink and another specialty, electronic publishing (which was then uncommon) allowed Landart to advance.

== See also ==
- Business process outsourcing
- Computer bureau
- Gestor
- Payroll service bureau
- Service provider
- Software as a service
- Time-sharing
- Utility computing
