= Sally Blount =

American academic and corporate board member

Sally Blount is the Michael L. Nemmers Professor of Strategy at the Kellogg School of Management at Northwestern University, where she is the former dean and alumna. She serves on the boards of directors for Abbott Laboratories, Ulta Beauty, and the Joyce Foundation and on advisory boards for the Aspen Institute, the Chicago Innovation Awards, the Indian School of Business, the Hong Kong University of Science and Technology, and the Fundação Dom Cabral. In 2012, she co-chaired the World Economic Forum’s conference on Latin America.

Blount graduated from Princeton University in 1983 with a joint degree from the School of Engineering and Applied Sciences and the Woodrow Wilson School of Public and International Affairs. She then worked as an associate for the Boston Consulting Group and as a business manager for Eva Maddox Associates in Chicago. In 1988, she enrolled in the doctoral program at Kellogg, graduating with a PhD in Organizational Behavior in 1992.

Upon graduation, Blount served on the faculty of the Booth School of Business at the University of Chicago for nine years. She transitioned to the Stern School of Business at New York University in 2001. After teaching at Stern for three years, in 2004, Blount was appointed vice dean and then dean of undergraduate students. Under her leadership, Stern received a $15 million gift, the largest in its history. In 2007, Blount added onto her work at Stern by becoming the special adviser for global academic integration for NYU’s president and provost. She played a key role in the establishment of NYU’s new campus in Abu Dhabi.

Blount served as Kellogg’s dean from 2010 until 2018. When she was appointed, the Financial Times wrote, "Blount will arguably become the most influential female dean in the US, representing the only one of the self-appointed group of seven top graduate business schools to have a woman in the job". Under Blount, Kellogg completed a $365-million fundraising campaign; constructed a 415,000-square-foot, lakefront building called the "Global Hub"; expanded Kellogg's Executive MBA program and enhanced Kellogg's international standing.

Blount has published papers based on her research in the Journal of Applied Psychology, the Negotiation Journal, and the Academy of Management Review.
