= Booz Allen Hamilton =

American management and consulting IT firm

Booz Allen Hamilton Holding Corporation
- Type: Public
- Traded as: NYSE: BAH (Class A); S&P 400 component
- Industry: Management consulting; Technology consulting
- Founded: June 18, 1914; 112 years ago
- Founders: Edwin G. Booz; James L. Allen; Carl L. Hamilton
- Headquarters: McLean, Virginia, U.S.
- Key people: Horacio D. Rozanski (Chairman, President & CEO)
- Services: Management and Technology Consulting
- Revenue: ▲US$10.7 billion (2024)
- Operating income: ▲US$1.01 billion (2024)
- Net income: ▲US$606 million (2024)
- Total assets: ▲US$6.56 billion (2024)
- Total equity: ▲US$1.05 billion (2024)
- Number of employees: 34,200 (2024)
- Website: boozallen.com

Booz Allen Hamilton Holding Corporation (informally Booz Allen) is the parent of Booz Allen Hamilton Inc., an American government and military contractor specializing in intelligence, technology, and cybersecurity. The company is headquartered in McLean, Virginia, in the Washington metropolitan area, with 80 additional offices around the globe. Booz Allen's stated core business is to provide consulting, analysis, and engineering services to public- and private-sector organizations and nonprofits.

It is a major provider of cybersecurity services to the U.S. Security and Exchange Commission. Nearly all of the company's revenue comes from U.S. government contracts.

== History ==
=== 20th century ===
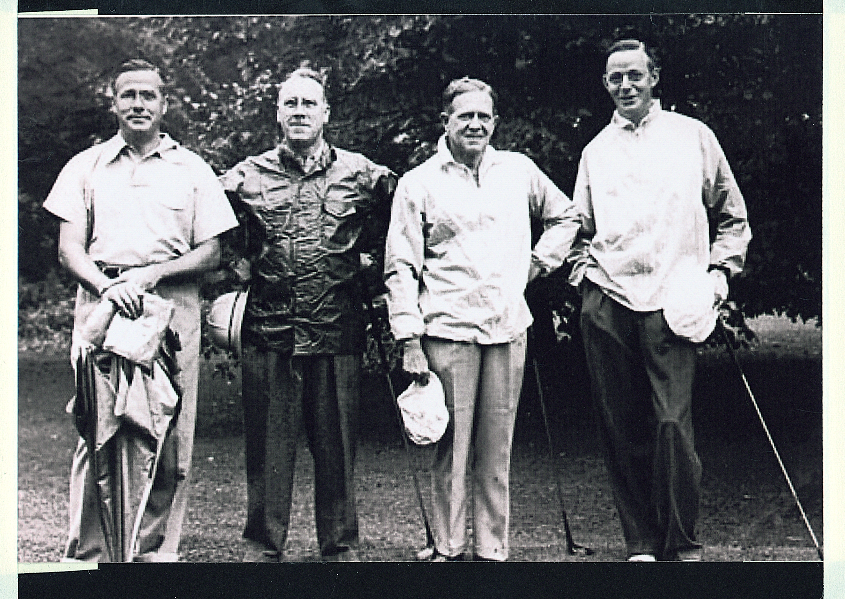
Founding partners (from left to right): George Fry, Edwin G. Booz, Carl L. Hamilton, and James L. Allen

The company that was to become Booz Allen was founded in 1914, in Evanston, Illinois, when Northwestern University graduate Edwin G. Booz founded the Business Research Service. The service was based on Booz's theory that companies would be more successful if they could call on someone outside their own organizations for expert, impartial advice. Booz's service attracted a number of clients, such as Goodyear Tire & Rubber Company, Chicago's Union Stockyards and Transit Company, and the Canadian Pacific Railway.

During the following three decades, the company went through a number of name changes and business models, eventually settling on Booz, Fry, Allen & Hamilton, named after their partnership in 1936. Before George A. Fry's departure in 1942, the company's name was changed again to Booz Allen Hamilton.

The post-World War II era saw a shift in the company's client pool, with many contracts coming from governmental institutions and different branches of the Armed Forces.

Edwin G. Booz died in 1951. The company received its first international contract two years later, in 1953, to help reorganize land-ownership records for the newly established Philippines government.

Booz Allen has been credited with developing several business concepts. In 1957, Sam Johnson, great grandson of the S.C. Johnson & Son founder, and Booz Allen's Conrad Jones published How to Organize for New Products which discussed theories on product life-cycle management. In 1958, Gordon Pehrson, deputy director of U.S. Navy Special Projects Office, and Bill Pocock of Booz Allen Hamilton developed the Program Evaluation and Review Technique (PERT). In 1982, Booz Allen's Keith Oliver coined the term "supply chain management".

The partnership was dissolved in 1962 and the company was registered as a private corporation. In 1998, Booz Allen Hamilton developed a strategy for the IRS to reshuffle its 100,000 employees into units focused on particular taxpayer categories.

=== 21st century ===
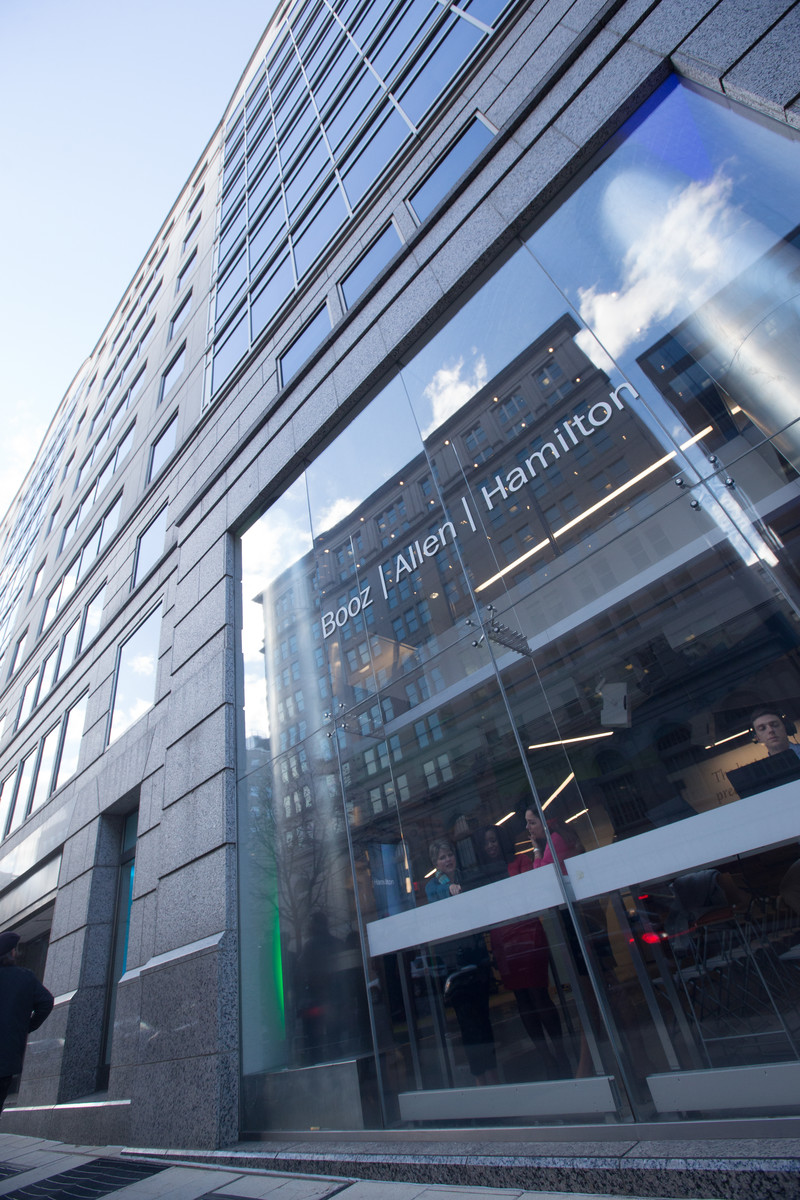
Booz Allen office, Washington, D.C.

Bloomberg named Booz Allen "the world's most profitable spy organization". According to an Information Week piece from 2002, Booz Allen had "more than one thousand former intelligence officers on its staff." According to its own website, the company employs more than 10,000 personnel who have cleared TS/SCI background checks.

In 2006, at the request of the Article 29 Working Party (an advisory group to the European Commission), the American Civil Liberties Union (ACLU) and Privacy International (PI) investigated the U.S. government's SWIFT surveillance program, and Booz Allen's role therein. The ACLU and PI filed a memo at the end of their investigation, which called into question the ethics and legality of a government contractor (in this case Booz Allen) acting as auditors of a government program, when that contractor is heavily involved with those same agencies on other contracts. The basic statement was that a conflict of interest may exist. Beyond that, the implication was also made that Booz Allen may be complicit in a program (electronic surveillance of SWIFT) that may be deemed illegal by the European Commission.

A June 28, 2007 article in The Washington Post related how a United States Department of Homeland Security contract with Booz Allen increased from $2 million to more than $70 million through two no-bid contracts, one occurring after the DHS's legal office had advised DHS not to continue the contract until after a review. A Government Accountability Office (GAO) report on the contract characterized it as not well-planned and lacking any measure for assuring valuable work to be completed. Elaine Duke, the department's chief procurement officer, acknowledged the problems with the Booz Allen contract, but said those matters have been resolved. She defended a decision to issue a second no-bid contract in 2005 as necessary to keep an essential intelligence operation running until a competition could be held.

In 2008, the commercial arm of Booz Allen split off to form Booz & Company. In 2013, Booz & Company was acquired by PwC and renamed as Strategy&. Since then, Booz Allen has re-entered commercial markets. In 2010, Booz Allen went public with an initial public offering of 14,000,000 shares at $17 per share. In 2012, Booz Allen purchased the Defense Systems Engineering & Support division of ARINC, adding approximately 1,000 new employees to its roster. In 2014, Booz Allen acquired Epidemico.

On July 11, 2011 the group Anonymous, as part of its Operation AntiSec, hacked into Booz Allen servers, extracting e-mails and non-salted passwords from the U.S. military. This information and a complete dump of the database were placed in a file shared on The Pirate Bay. Despite Anonymous' claims that 90,000 emails were released, the Associated Press counted only 67,000 unique emails, of which only 53,000 were military addresses. The remainder of the addresses came from educational institutions and defense contractors. Anonymous also said that it accessed four gigabytes of Booz Allen source code and deleted those four gigabytes. According to a statement by the group, "We infiltrated a server on their network that basically had no security measures in place." Anonymous accused Booz Allen of working with HBGary Federal by creating a project for the manipulation of social media. Anonymous also accused Booz Allen of participating in intelligence-gathering and surveillance programs of the U.S. federal government and, as stated by Kukil Bora of the International Business Times, "possible illegal activities". Booz Allen confirmed the intrusion on 13 July, but contradicted Anonymous' claims in saying that the attack never got past their own systems, meaning that information from the military should be secure. In August of that year, during a conference call with analysts, Ralph Shrader, the chairman and CEO, stated that "the cost of remediation and other activities directly associated with the attack" were not expected to have a "material effect on our financial results".

In June 2012, Booz Allen expanded its operations in North Africa and the Middle East, with initial plans to add operations in Kuwait, Oman, Qatar, United Arab Emirates. It planned to later add operations to Bahrain, Saudi Arabia, and Turkey, during a time when those countries, as stated by Jill R. Aitoro of the Washington Business Journal, were "recover[ing] from the turmoil associated with the Arab Spring". The Booz Allen employee base, when it was a part of Booz & Company, had long-term relationships with many North African and Middle Eastern countries; Booz Allen had split from Booz & Company.

In June 2013, Edward Snowden—at the time a Booz Allen employee contracted to projects of the National Security Agency (NSA)—publicly disclosed details of classified mass surveillance and data collection programs, including PRISM. The alleged leaks are said to rank among the most significant breaches in the history of the NSA and led to considerable concern worldwide. Booz Allen condemned Snowden's leak of the existence of PRISM as "shocking" and "a grave violation of the code of conduct and core values of our firm". The company fired Snowden in absentia shortly after and stated he had been an employee for less than three months at the time. Market analysts considered the incident "embarrassing" but unlikely to cause enduring commercial damage. Booz Allen stated that it would work with authorities and clients to investigate the leak. Charles Riley of CNN/Money said that Booz Allen was "scrambling to distance itself from Snowden". According to Reuters, a source "with detailed knowledge on the matter" stated that Booz Allen's hiring screeners detected possible discrepancies in Snowden's résumé regarding his education, since some details "did not check out precisely" but decided to hire him anyway; Reuters stated that the element which triggered these concerns, or the manner in which Snowden satisfied the concerns, were not known. On July 10, 2013, the United States Air Force stated that it cleared Booz Allen of wrongdoing regarding the Snowden case.

In 2013, David Sirota of Salon said that Booz Allen and parent company The Carlyle Group make significant political contributions to the Democratic Party and the Republican Party as well as individual politicians, including Barack Obama and John McCain. Sirota concluded that "many of the politicians now publicly defending the surveillance state and slamming whistleblowers like Snowden have taken huge sums of money from these two firms", referring to Booz Allen and Carlyle, and that the political parties are "bankrolled by these firms". According to Maplight, a company that tracked campaign donations, Booz Allen gave a total of just over $87,000 to U.S. lawmakers from 2007 to June 2013. According to CNBC, these contributions resulted in a steady stream of government contracts, which puts Booz Allen in privileged position. Due to the company's important government services, “the government is unlikely to let the company go out of business. It's too connected to fail”. Furthermore, the influence Booz Allen carries in Washington isn't restricted to donations, but to a large network of lobbyists and political insiders. According to government watchdog OpenSecrets, “4 out of 6 Booz Allen Hamilton lobbyists in 2015-2016 have previously held government jobs”.

In 2013, Booz Allen's Mark Herman, Stephanie Rivera, Steven Mills, and Michael Kim published the Field Guide to Data Science. A second edition was published in 2015. In 2017, Booz Allen's Josh Sullivan and Angela Zutavern published The Mathematical Corporation.

Booz Allen helped the Government of the United Arab Emirates create an equivalent of the National Security Agency for that country. According to David E. Sanger and Nicole Perlroth of The New York Times, "one Arab official familiar with the effort" said that "They are teaching everything. Data mining, Web surveillance, all sorts of digital intelligence collection." In 2013 Sanger and Perlroth said that the company "profits handsomely from its worldwide expansion". Booz Allen has particularly come under scrutiny for its ties to the government of Saudi Arabia and the support it provides to the Saudi armed forces. Alongside competitors McKinsey & Company and Boston Consulting Group, Booz Allen are seen as important factors in Crown Prince Mohammed bin Salman’s drive to consolidate power in the Kingdom. On the military side, Booz Allen is employing dozens of retired American military personnel to train and advise the Royal Saudi Navy and provide logistics for the Saudi Army, but denies its expertise is used by Saudi Arabia in its war against Yemen. Additionally, it also entered an agreement with the Saudi government that involves the protection and cyber-security of government ministries, with experts arguing that these defensive maneuvers could easily be used to target dissidents. David Sirota of Salon said that politicians in the United States who received financing from Booz Allen and "other firms with a similar multinational business model" have vested interests in "denigrating the democratic protest movements that challenge Mideast surveillance states that make those donors big money, too."

In 2015, Booz Allen acquired the software development division of the Charleston, S.C. technology firm SPARC. In 2017, Booz Allen acquired eGov Holdings. In 2018, the SEC awarded both Booz Allen and Attain a $2.5 billion contract to modernize how the SEC purchases IT services.

In 2016, the United States Forest Service awarded Booz Allen a contract to develop and manage Recreation.gov. Booz Allen has been criticized for profiting off transaction fees charged to users of Recreation.gov and failing to adequately maintain the site. In 2023, plaintiffs filed a class-action against Booz Allen alleging that Booz Allen was charging junk fees; the plaintiffs later filed a motion to voluntarily dismiss the case.

In February 2020, the company became the SEC's major provider of cybersecurity services by securing a 10-year contract worth $113 million. The company was awarded $4.4 billion in U.S. Federal obligations in fiscal year 2020.

Booz Allen Hamilton has faced criticism and coverage for its close ties with leaders of both major American political parties and their donations to them, as well as its longtime alliances with the militaries and surveillance entities of nations abroad.

In 2023, Booz Allen agreed to a $377 million settlement over allegations that it had fraudulently billed the U.S. government from 2011 to 2021, one of the largest procurement fraud settlements in history, without admitting civil liability. The settlement was the result of an investigation sparked by a whistleblower and former Booz Allen employee, who noticed that the firm was overbilling the U.S. government in 2016. The whistleblower said that Booz Allen lowballed the cost of work done with foreign governments and corporations, then lumped the costs it incurred together with U.S. government contracts to bill to the U.S. government. The whistleblower initially alerted colleagues of the overbilling, but says that she was told that the Department of Defense was "too stupid" or "not smart enough" to catch Booz Allen and recover the money. She subsequently filed a qui tam lawsuit under the False Claims Act against Booz Allen. A related federal criminal investigation into the company was closed without charges in 2021, while a Securities and Exchange Commission investigation is ongoing as of 2023.

In 2025, Booz Allen Hamilton was one of the donors who funded the White House's East Wing demolition and planned building of a ballroom.

== See also ==
- Booz & Company (spin-off of Booz & Company in 2008)
- Booz Allen Classic
- List of United States defense contractors
- Top 100 US Federal Contractors
- List of IT consulting firms
- Espionage
- Counterespionage
