= Edwin G. Booz =

American businessman

- Born: September 2, 1887; Reading, Pennsylvania
- Died: October 14, 1951 (aged 64); Evanston, Illinois
- Education: Northwestern University
- Occupations: management consultant, businessman, corporate executive
- Known for: Co-founder Booz Allen Hamilton
- Spouse: Helen Hootman Booz (m. 1918)
- Children: 2
- Parent(s): Thomas Booz; Sally Spencer Booz (d. 1891)

Edwin George Booz (September 2, 1887 – October 14, 1951) was an American management consultant, businessman and corporate executive. He co-founded the consulting firm Booz Allen Hamilton.

== Biography ==
=== Early life and career ===
Booz was born in 1887 in Reading, Pennsylvania, to Thomas H. Booz and Sarah (Spencer) Booz. At the Kellogg School at Northwestern University he obtained his bachelor's degree in economics in 1912, and his master's degree in psychology in 1914. Two years after his graduation Booz founded the Business Research Service in 1914. His business was briefly put on hold while he served in the Army from 1917 to 1919. The business he founded would eventually become known as Booz Allen Hamilton.

=== Retirement and death ===
Booz retired partially from the firm in 1946 and died of a stroke in October 1951.
