= Kellogg School of Management =

Business school of Northwestern University

Northwestern University Kellogg School of Management
- Former names: School of Commerce (1908–1956); School of Business (1956–1979); J.L. Kellogg Graduate School of Management (1979–2001)
- Type: Private business school
- Established: 1908
- Parent institution: Northwestern University
- Accreditation: AACSB
- Endowment: $1.081 billion (as of June 30, 2022)
- Dean: Francesca Cornelli
- Postgraduates: 1,162
- Location: Evanston, Illinois, United States; 42.05045°N 87.67507°W
- Website: kellogg.northwestern.edu

The Northwestern University Kellogg School of Management (branded as Northwestern Kellogg) is the graduate business school of Northwestern University, a private research university in Evanston, Illinois. It was founded in 1908.

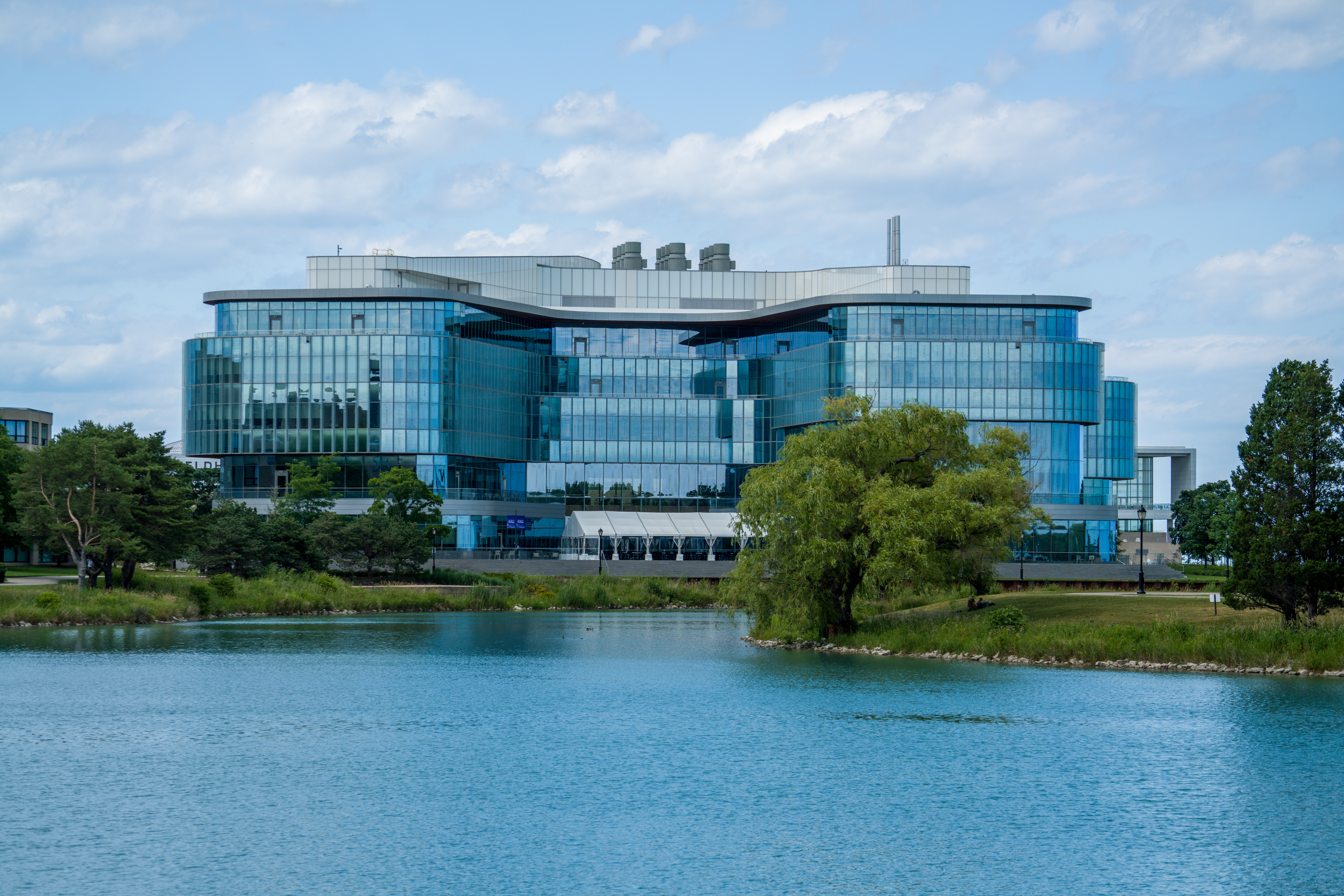
The Kellogg Global Hub

== History ==
=== Early history (1908–1950) ===
The school was founded in 1908 as Northwestern University's School of Commerce. It offered a part-time evening program. It was a founding member of the Association to Advance Collegiate Schools of Business, that sets accreditation standards for business schools. The school played a major role in helping to establish the Graduate Management Admission Test. Also, researchers associated with the school have made contributions to fields such as marketing and decision sciences. For instance, Walter Dill Scott, a pioneer in applied psychology, helped establish some of the earliest advertising and marketing courses in the first decade of the twentieth century. He went on to serve as president of Northwestern University from 1920 to 1939. More recently, Philip Kotler and Sidney J. Levy's groundbreaking 1969 Journal of Marketing article, "Broadening the Conception of Marketing," laid the foundations for a greatly expanded understanding of marketing. Similarly, Kotler's Marketing Management text has played a key role in deepening the field's scholarship.

In 1919, Ralph E. Heilman, a Northwestern graduate with a doctorate from Harvard, was appointed the dean of the school. And in the next year, the school launched a graduate program leading toward the Master of Business Administration degree, drawing nearly 400 students in its first two years.

=== Changes in focus and international expansion (1951–1978) ===
In 1951, the school began offering executive education courses. The Institute for Management, a four-week summer program based in Evanston, expanded the following year to two sections. The program's success eventually led to it being expanded in Europe in 1965 with a similar program offered in Bürgenstock, Switzerland. In 1976, the school expanded its executive education offerings in Evanston, introducing a degree-granting program known as the Executive Management Program (EMP, today known as the Executive MBA Program). A watershed event in the school's history was the opening of the James L. Allen Center, home of the Kellogg executive education programs. The vision of Dean Donald P. Jacobs (deanship 1975–2001; on faculty in Finance Department since 1957), the Allen Center enlisted the help of significant business figures in the Chicago-area, most notably James L. Allen, a Kellogg alumnus and co-founder of consultancy Booz Allen Hamilton. The Allen Center's cornerstone was laid in 1978 while the facility officially opened October 31, 1979.

In 1956, the school was renamed the School of Business; little more than a decade later, in 1969, the school once again changed its name, this time to the Graduate School of Management, a designation that reflected the demand among the business community for sophisticated managers trained in both analytical and behavioral skills. Also, this training was oriented toward general management, rather than narrowly functional skills, as had mostly been the case in many business schools for much of the 20th century. The training was designed to provide management skills suitable for leadership roles whether in the corporate, public, or nonprofit sectors – rather than careers focused solely on traditional business. To reflect this change, the school in 1969 stopped issuing the MBA credential in favor of the MM, or master of management degree. A point of differentiation for nearly three decades, the school more recently returned to the traditional MBA.

These dramatic changes were predicated upon a key change under Dean John Barr (1965–1975): In 1966, Northwestern elected to discontinue its highly respected undergraduate program (the School of Business) to focus its energies solely on graduate education. The school decided to pursue a research-based faculty. It quickly attracted a number of world-class quantitative experts, many in the field of game theory, to build the school's Managerial Economics and Decision Sciences Department. This department was founded in 1967 and initially led by Professor Stanley Reiter.

=== Continued expansion: John L. Kellogg (1979–2008) ===
In 1979, in honor of a $10 million gift made to the school on behalf of John L. Kellogg, son of W.K. Kellogg, the school was renamed as the J.L. Kellogg Graduate School of Management. The funds allowed the school to significantly expand its research and teaching mission by establishing three endowed professorships; two major centers of interdisciplinary research; four research professorships; and a large dormitory. Even before the Kellogg gift, the school had been expanding its research-focused faculty: In 1978 alone, the school added six additional "named" professorships and two new research professorships.

In 2001, its name was shortened to the Kellogg School of Management.

=== Recent history (2009–today) ===
In June 2009, Kellogg announced that Dipak C. Jain would step down after eight years as dean and return to teaching. On September 1, 2009, Sunil Chopra, former Senior Associate Dean for Curriculum and Teaching and the IBM Distinguished Professor of Operations Management, assumed the role of interim dean while a search committee worked to find a permanent replacement. Later in 2009, Northwestern University announced plans to construct a new building at the northeast corner of its Evanston campus to serve as Kellogg's new home. The new facility, called the Global Hub, opened in March 2017 adjacent to Lake Michigan and includes classrooms, faculty offices, collaborative learning spaces, and administrative offices.

In March 2010, Kellogg announced that Sally Blount would replace Sunil Chopra as dean, starting in July. Blount was the dean of the undergraduate college, and vice dean of the Stern School of Business at New York University. Dean Blount launched ambitious marketing and capital campaigns. These started in 2011 with the Think Bravely campaign, and subsequently announced a new Inspiring Growth campaign in 2014. This campaign is focused on the dual meaning of creating economic value while increasing self-knowledge and insight.

On February 6, 2012, Blount unveiled a seven-year plan, Envision Kellogg, aimed at restructuring the business school and launching Kellogg to the top of global rankings. As of 2018, $365 million of the campaign target of $350 million have been raised. On July 12, 2018, Kathleen Hagerty was named interim dean while Kellogg searched for a new dean. In February 2019, Kellogg announced that Francesca Cornelli would succeed Hagerty as dean.

In November 2024, Kellogg announced plans to replace the James L. Allen Center, which has served as the home of the Kellogg School of Management's executive education programs since 1979. The new facility will be constructed on the same lakefront site on the university's North Campus in Evanston, Illinois. Designed by the New York City-based architectural firm Kohn Pedersen Fox (KPF), the building will include updated classrooms, meeting areas, dining spaces, and lodging accommodations. It will also be connected to the existing Kellogg Global Hub via an underground tunnel. The project is part of Kellogg's $600 million Full Circle campaign, aimed at enhancing the school's infrastructure and academic offerings. Construction began in 2025, with completion anticipated in 2027.

== Campuses ==
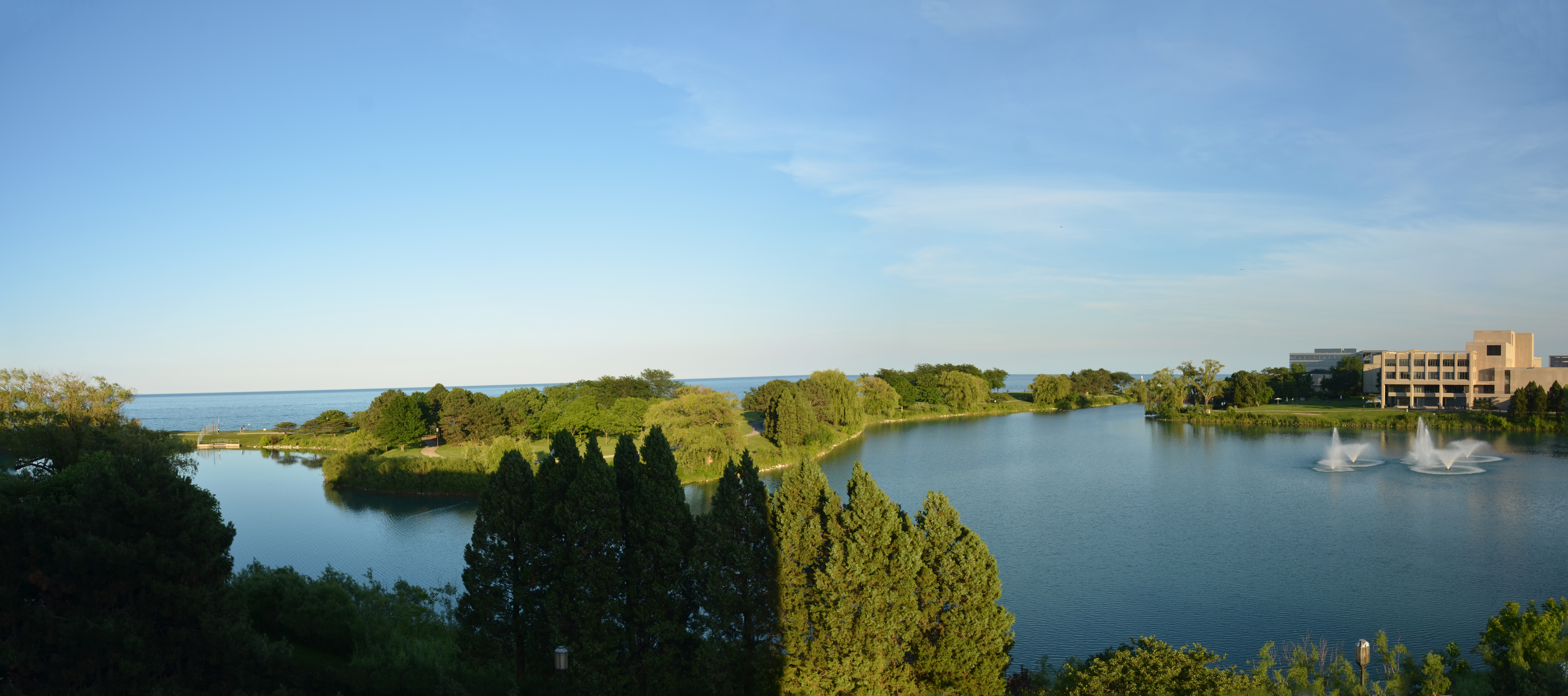
View in Summer, from 3rd floor dorm of Allen Center, Kellogg School of Management

The Kellogg School's full-time and Executive MBA facilities are situated along the shores of Lake Michigan in Evanston, Illinois, on Chicago's North Shore, while the school's evening and weekend MBA program is housed on Northwestern's Downtown Chicago campus in Wieboldt Hall, between the law and medical schools. The downtown campus is also on Lake Michigan to the east and close to Michigan Avenue to the west. In January 2006, Kellogg opened a new campus for its EMBA program for Latin American executives in Miami.

Students in the Kellogg full-time program take the majority of their classes at the Global Hub, which opened on March 28, 2017. This 415,000 square-foot building is located on the shores of Lake Michigan. Toronto-based Kuwabara Payne McKenna Blumberg Architects designed this building. The Global Hub is built-out in four directions surrounding two atriums and numerous other commons areas. The building includes a design lab with 3D-printing equipment and an art studio.

== Academics ==
=== Admissions ===
Kellogg was the first business school in the world to insist that all applicants be interviewed to assess their leadership potential and suitability for the Kellogg School's cooperative environment. As a result, in addition to grades, GMAT scores, professional achievement, and demonstrated leadership, 'fit' is an important part of the admissions equation at Kellogg.

=== Programs ===
Kellogg offers full-time MBA, Executive MBA, MMM (MBA + MSDI), JD-MBA, MBAi, MD-MBA, evening and weekend MBA, Master of Science in Management Studies programs, course offerings for programs such as MEM as well as Ph.D. programs in several fields, and non-degree executive education programs.

=== Student profile ===
50% of the students in Kellogg's full-time MBA program for the Class of 2026 are women. 40% of the Class of 2026 consists of international students. The Class of 2026 achieved an average GMAT score of 733. Average undergraduate GPA was 3.7 for the Class of 2026.

Based on the school's 2022 employment statistics, 40% of full-time MBA graduates were employed in consulting, 21% in technology, and 16% in financial services.

== Rankings ==
Business school rankings

United States
- QS MBA: 7
- Financial Times MBA: 5
- Bloomberg MBA: 3
- USNWR MBA: 4
- THE Business: 10

Global
- QS MBA: 13
- Financial Times MBA: 11
- THE Business: 17

In the 2021 rankings of U.S. business schools, Kellogg was ranked 2nd by U.S. News & World Report, In addition, Kellogg MBA has consistently been ranked 1st in Marketing by U.S. News & World Report.

Three of the Kellogg School's other executive MBA programs were also ranked 5th by the Financial Times in 2022. The Kellogg-HKUST Executive MBA Program at the Hong Kong UST Business School was ranked No. 2 in the world, the school's Kellogg-Schulich Executive MBA program at York University in Canada was ranked No. 33 in the world and No. 1 in Canada, while the school's Kellogg-WHU Executive MBA program at WHU Business School in Germany was ranked No. 22 in the world.

== Student life ==
Students tend to be very active in impacting the local Evanston and Chicago communities, and frequently collaborate on philanthropic causes. One example combining the campus culture and passion for giving is the annual Charity Auction Ball, held each winter quarter.

Unlike many peer schools, Kellogg does disclose grades to recruiters. The issue of grade disclosure was last voted on by students in 2005, and a process exists whereby Kellogg students can vote to change the policy.

== Notable people ==
=== Alumni ===
Kellogg has an alumni network of over 67,000 graduates working in nearly every industry and endeavor. Alumni can participate in over 60 active regional alumni clubs and more than 20 special interest clubs. The Kellogg Alumni Council helps strengthen connections among alumni. In 2022, there were active KAC members in North America, Latin America, Europe, and Asia.

Current Kellogg students are encouraged to interact with alumni on a number of levels. Most recently, the evening & weekend MBA program introduced the Kellogg Alumni Mentorship Program (KAMP). KAMP asks current students and alumni to fill out a short survey and then matches mentors and mentees by areas of interest. Alumni Clubs like The Kellogg Alumni Club of Chicago provide alumni with the opportunity to enrich their connections, careers, and lives through an ongoing array of social, professional development and networking events that are offered exclusively to Kellogg alumni living in the Chicago area.

==== Companies started by Kellogg alumni ====
- Adzuna, founded by Doug Monro, '02
- Aon Corporation, founded by Pat Ryan, '59
- AQR Capital, founded by David Kabiller
- Arthur Andersen, founded by Arthur E. Andersen
- Blackstone, founded by Peter G. Peterson, '47
- Booz Allen Hamilton, founded by Edwin G. Booz and James L. Allen
- Crate & Barrel, founded by Gordon Segal
- Ethos Water, founded by Peter Thum and Jonathan Greenblatt
- Kayak.com, founded by Steve Hafner, '97
- One Acre Fund, founded by Andrew Youn.
- OpenTable, founded by Chuck Templeton
- ValueAct Capital, Founder Jeffrey W. Ubben, '87
- ZS Associates, founded by Andris A. Zoltners and Prabhakant Sinha

=== Faculty (past and present) ===
- Arthur E. Andersen, founder of the auditing firm bearing his name, member of faculty between 1909 and 1922; member of the Northwestern University board of trustees from 1933 to 1934
- Bala V. Balachandran, J. L. Kellogg Distinguished Professor of Accounting and Information Management
- Efraim Benmelech, Harold L. Stuart Professor of Finance
- Timothy Calkins, Clinical Professor of Marketing
- Janice Eberly, James R. and Helen D. Russell Distinguished Professor of Finance
- Christopher Galvin, chairman and chief executive officer of Motorola from 1997 to 2003
- Shane Greenstein, expert on the business economics of computing, communications, and the internet and the chair of the Management and Strategy Department from 2002 to 2005
- Ravi Jagannathan, Chicago Mercantile Exchange/John F. Sandner Professor of Finance
- Benjamin Jones, former Rhodes Scholar, former senior economist for macroeconomics for the White House Council of Economic Advisers, innovation and economic development researcher
- Dean Karlan, Professor of Economics and Finance
- Philip Kotler, marketing scholar
- Marvin Manheim, William A. Patterson Distinguished Professor of Transportation
- Dale T. Mortensen, Nobel Prize in Economics recipient in 2010 for his work on the search and matching theory of frictional unemployment
- J. Keith Murnighan, Harold H. Hines Jr. Distinguished Professor of Risk Management
- Roger Myerson, faculty between 1976 and 2001; winner of the 2007 Nobel Prize in Economics
- Sergio Rebelo, Professor of Finance
- Paola Sapienza, included in the Thomson Reuters list of the most influential scientific minds in 2014, 2015, and 2016
- Mark Satterthwaite, A.C. Buehler Professor in Hospital and Health Services Management
- Mohanbir Sawhney, pioneer in the field of technology management and one of the 25 most influential people in e-Business as ranked by Businessweek in May 2000
- Walter D. Scott, former CEO of Ameriprise Financial
- Joseph A. Swanson, professor, businessman, writer
- Brian Uzzi, Richard L. Thomas Professor of Leadership best known for his work in the fields of sociology, network science, the science of science, and complex systems
- Robert J. Weber, Frederic E. Nemmers Professor of Decision Sciences

== See also ==
- List of business schools in the United States
- List of United States business school rankings
