= Strategy+Business =

Business magazine

strategy+business
- Editor: Daniel Gross (2020-present); Art Kleiner (2005-January 2020); Randall Rothenberg (2000–2005); Joel Kurtzman (1995–1999)
- Categories: Finance; innovation; marketing, media and sales; operations and manufacturing; strategy and leadership; sustainability; auto, airlines, and transport; consumer products; energy; healthcare; technology; research
- Frequency: Quarterly (print, digital edition, apps), daily (online)
- Format: Business Periodical
- Publisher: Gretchen Hall
- Total circulation: 607,202 (2018)
- Founded: 1995
- Company: PwC
- Based in: New York City
- Language: English
- Website: www.strategy-business.com
- ISSN: 1083-706X

Strategy+Business (stylized as strategy+business) is a business magazine focusing on management and corporate strategy. Headquartered in New York, it is published by member firms of the PricewaterhouseCoopers (PwC) network.

Articles cover industry topics of interest to CEOs and other senior executives, as well as to business academics and researchers. The articles, written in English, are authored by a mix of figures from both the executive suite and academia in addition to journalists and consultants from PwC.

The magazine's founding editor-in-chief, Joel Kurtzman, coined the term thought leadership when he published interviews with influential business figures under the rubric “Thought Leaders.” Interviews with “Thought Leaders” remain a recurring feature on the strategy+business website.

== History ==
Before the separation of Booz & Company (now Strategy&) from Booz Allen Hamilton in 2008, strategy+business was published by Booz Allen Hamilton as Strategy & Business since its launch in 1995.

Joel Kurtzman, formerly editor-in-chief of the Harvard Business Review and a business editor and columnist at The New York Times — together with a group of partners at Booz & Company, which was then part of Booz Allen Hamilton — founded strategy+business in 1995.

Randall Rothenberg succeeded Kurtzman, serving as editor-in-chief between 2000 and 2005. Previously, Rothenberg had been an editor of The New York Times Magazine and had also served as the newspaper's advertising columnist. He redesigned strategy+business, introduced the “Best Business Books” section, and expanded coverage of electronic media. Rothenberg's first major issue, which was published in February 2000, was titled “E-Business: Lessons from Planet Earth,” and contained articles that prophesied the dot-com crash that occurred several months later. During Rothenberg's tenure, the strategy+business staff was formally brought into the Booz Allen Hamilton operation; before that, the magazine had been a standalone, contracted enterprise.

Art Kleiner succeeded Rothenberg in 2005 and served as editor-in-chief until January 2020. A writer, lecturer, and commentator, Kleiner is the author of The Age of Heretics: A History of the Radical Thinkers Who Reinvented Corporate Management (Currency/Doubleday, 1996; rev’d. ed., 2008, Jossey-Bass) and Who Really Matters: The Core Group Theory of Power, Privilege, and Success (Currency/Doubleday, 2003).

During Kleiner's tenure, the magazine published influential articles on neuroscience and leadership (a 2006 article by David Rock and Jeffrey Schwartz led to the establishment of the field of neuroleadership), women in emerging markets, investment in infrastructure, organizational culture, theories of economic change, and market dislocation. In 2020, financial and economic journalist Daniel Gross was named editor-in-chief.

After a private equity takeover by The Carlyle Group in 2008, Booz Allen Hamilton was split into two entities. Strategy+business became the flagship publication of the commercial firm, Booz & Company (now known as Strategy&). Strategy& is part of PricewaterhouseCoopers, which acquired it (as Booz & Company) on April 3, 2014.

== Readership ==
Strategy+business has a global audience of more than 1,000,000 readers, with a circulation of about 600,000 through its digital editions.

== Contributors ==
The magazine's contributors have included Warren Bennis, Ram Charan, Stewart Brand, Nicholas Carr, Denise Caruso, Glenn Hubbard, Sheena Iyengar, Rosabeth Moss Kanter, Jon Katzenbach, A.G. Lafley, Franco Modigliani, Kenichi Ohmae, C.K. Prahalad (including a posthumous article), Sally Helgesen, Marshall Goldsmith, Sylvia Ann Hewlett, and Peter Senge.

Those interviewed as "thought leaders" include Bob Wright, Vineet Jain, Sir Martin Sorrell, Tom Peters, Joe Kaeser, Jonathan Haidt, Bran Ferren, Frances Hesselbein, Andrew Ng, Geoffrey West, Mark Bertolini, Ellen Langer, Zhang Ruimin, Rita Gunther McGrath, Eric Ries, Douglas Rushkoff, David Kantor, Douglas Conant, Otto Scharmer, Clayton Christensen, Betty Sue Flowers, Rakesh Khurana, Philip Bobbitt, John Chambers, Arie de Geus, Gary Hamel, Charles Handy, Daniel Kahneman, John Kao, Sylvia Nasar, Carlota Perez, Paul Romer, Anne-Marie Slaughter, Shelly Palmer, Vineet Jain, Kenji Yoshino, Ian Bremmer, John Coyle, Sally Blount, Michael Useem, Harbir Singh, Daniel Gross, Linda Hasenfratz, and Meg Wheatley.

The magazine also features a variety of illustrators and photographers, including Guy Billout, Seymour Chwast, Lars Leetaru, Peter Gregoire, and Dan Page.

== Features ==
Strategy+Business also publishes “Global Innovation 1000,” a report that examines corporate spending on research and development each year, based on research conducted by Strategy&. The magazine's most popular pieces were collected in “15 Years, 50 Classics,” published in 2010. In 2015, s+b celebrated two decades with a special collection of online essays, including an interactive history of management theory titled "20 Questions for Business Leaders."

=== Best Business Books ===
Strategy+business publishes an annual feature called “Best Business Books,” where business books are reviewed systematically. Writers of these essays (who select the books in each category) have included Bethany McLean, Frances Cairncross, Clive Crook, Krisztina "Z" Holly, Walter Kiechel III, Steven Levy, Nell Minow, Howard Rheingold, Kenneth Roman, David Warsh, James Surowiecki, Duff McDonald, J. Bradford DeLong, and Dov Zakheim.
