= Katzenbach =

Katzenbach may refer to:

== Places ==
- Katzenbach, Germany, a municipality in the Donnersbergkreis district, in Rhineland-Palatinate, Germany
- Katzenberg, subdivision in Kapelln, Austria
- Katzenbach (Werre), a river of North Rhine-Westphalia, Germany
- Katzenbach (Neckar), a river of Baden-Württemberg, Germany

== People ==
- Frank S. Katzenbach (1868–1929), New Jersey Supreme Court justice
- Edward L. Katzenbach (1878–1934), New Jersey Attorney General, brother of Frank S. Katzenbach, father of Nicholas Katzenbach
- Nicholas Katzenbach (1922–2012), U.S. Attorney General during the Lyndon B. Johnson administration, son of Edward L. Katzenbach
- Marie Hilson Katzenbach (1882–1970), American educator, wife of Edward L. Katzenbach
- John Katzenbach (born 1950), American novelist, son of Nicholas Katzenbach
- Jon Katzenbach, American management consultant and author

== Supreme Court cases ==
- Katzenbach v. McClung, 1964 case in which the Court held that Congress acted within its power under the Commerce Clause of the United States Constitution in forbidding racial discrimination in restaurants as this was a burden to interstate commerce.
- Katzenbach v. Morgan, 1966 case regarding the power of Congress, pursuant to Section 5 of the Fourteenth Amendment, to enact laws which enforce and interpret provisions of the Constitution
- South Carolina v. Katzenbach, 1966 case which rejected a challenge by the state of South Carolina to the preclearance provisions of the Voting Rights Act of 1965, which required that some states submit changes in election districts to the Attorney General of the United States (at the time, Nicholas Katzenbach).

== Other uses ==
- Katzenbach Partners, a management consulting firm
