= Jenae Neiderhiser =

American behavior geneticist

Jenae M. Neiderhiser
- Education: Pennsylvania State University (Ph.D., 1994); Pennsylvania State University (Master of Science, 1990); University of Pittsburgh (Bachelor of Science, 1988)
- Known for: Gene–environment interactions
- Scientific career
- Fields: Behavior genetics
- Workplaces: Pennsylvania State University
- Thesis: Family environment and adjustment in adolescence: Genetic and environmental influences over time (1994)
- Doctoral advisor: Robert Plomin

Jenae M. Neiderhiser is an American behavior geneticist who is a Distinguished Professor of Psychology and Human Development and Family Studies at Pennsylvania State University, where she is also co-director of the Gene Environment Research Initiative.

== Career ==
Jenae M. Neiderhiser is a native of Pennsylvania, and received her B.A. in psychology (with a Biology minor) from the Johnstown campus of the University of Pittsburgh in 1988. She earned her Master's (1990) and Doctorate (1994) at Pennsylvania State University from the Department of Human Development and Family Studies. Her doctoral advisor was Robert Plomin, and her doctoral thesis was entitled "Family environment and adjustment in adolescence: Genetic and environmental influences over time".

After receiving her doctorate, Neiderhiser was a postdoctoral fellow from 1995 through 1997 at the Center for Family Research, Department of Psychiatry and Behavioral Sciences at George Washington University. She was also Assistant Research Professor at the Center for Family Research in the Department of Psychiatry and Behavioral Sciences from 1994 to 2000 and was promoted to Associate Research Professor in 2000. In 2006, she became Professor in the Department of Psychiatry and Behavioral Sciences. In 2007 she returned to Penn State as a Liberal Arts Research Professor of Psychology and Professor of Human Development and Family Studies, and was promoted to Distinguished Professor in 2017.

== Research ==
Neiderhiser studies the dual effect of genes and environment on behavior and is particularly interested in how individuals shape their own environments. She often uses twin and adoption studies in her research.

Neiderhiser has won numerous grants, including multi-million dollar grants from the National Institutes of Health with Leslie Leve and Jody Ganiban. One aim of the study is to understand how pollution and community violence affect adopted children.

Neiderhiser and her collaborators have found that “virtuous traits” such as conscientiousness and responsibility are influenced both by parenting and by genetics.

In earlier work, Neiderhiser examined the role of genetics on men's marital relationships. She and colleagues found that men who have certain genetic variant report less bonding with their partners, greater marital discord, and higher chances of divorce.

== Affiliations ==
She is the president of the Behavior Genetics Association for the term 2018–2019. She was elected as a Fellow of the Association for Psychological Science in 2016.

== Selected works ==
Jenae M. Neiderhiser has authored hundreds of articles, and several books.

=== Books ===
- Knopik, V.S., Neiderhiser, J.M., DeFries, J.C., & Plomin, R. (2017). Behavioral Genetics. Seventh Edition. Worth.
- Horwitz, B. N., & Neiderhiser, J. M. (Eds.). (2016). Gene-environment interplay in interpersonal relationships across the lifespan. New York, NY:Springer.
- Plomin, R., DeFries, J. C., Knopik, V. S., & Neiderhiser, J. M. (2005). Behavioral genetics. New York: Worth
- Reiss, D., Neiderhiser, J. M., Hetherington, E. M., & Plomin, R. (2000). The relationship code: Deciphering genetic and social influences on adolescent development. Cambridge, MA: Harvard University Press.

=== Articles ===
- Amanda M. Ramos, Amanda M. Griffin, Jenae M. Neiderhiser, David Reiss. Did I Inherit My Moral Compass? Examining Socialization and Evocative Mechanisms for Virtuous Character Development. Behavior Genetics, 2019; doi:10.1007/s10519-018-09945-4
- Neiderhiser, J. M., Marceau, K., de Araujo-Greecher, M., Ganiban, J. M., Shaw, D. S., Reiss, D. & Leve, L. D. (2016). Comparing medical records and self-report to measure pregnancy and delivery risk: Estimating the roles of genetic risk, perinatal risk, and rearing environment on early childhood adjustment. Behavior Genetics, 46(3), 334–352. doi:10.1007/s10519-016-9788-0
- Brotnow, L., Reiss, D., Stover, C.S., Ganiban, J., Leve, L.D., Neiderhiser, J.M., Shaw, D.S., Stevens, H.E. (2015). Expectant mothers maximizing opportunities: Maternal characteristics moderate multifactorial prenatal stress in the prediction of birth weight in a sample of children adopted at birth. PLoS ONE, 10(11): e0141881. doi:10.1371/journal.pone.0141881
- Narusyte, J., Andershed, A.-K., Neiderhiser, J.M. & Lichtenstein, P. (2007). Aggression as a mediator of genetic contributions to the association between negative parent-child relationships and adolescent antisocial behavior. Journal of European Child and Adolescent Psychiatry, 16(2), 128–137. PMID 17136502
- Neiderhiser, J.M., Reiss, D., & Hetherington, E.M. (1996). Genetically informative designs for distinguishing developmental pathways during adolescence: Responsible and antisocial behavior. Development and Psychopathology, 8(4), 779–791.
