= Clare Chambers =

Clare Chambers may refer to:

- Clare Chambers (novelist), English novelist
- Clare Chambers (philosopher), professor of philosophy
- Claire Chambers, CEO of Journelle
