= Chip Bell =

American writer

Chip R. Bell
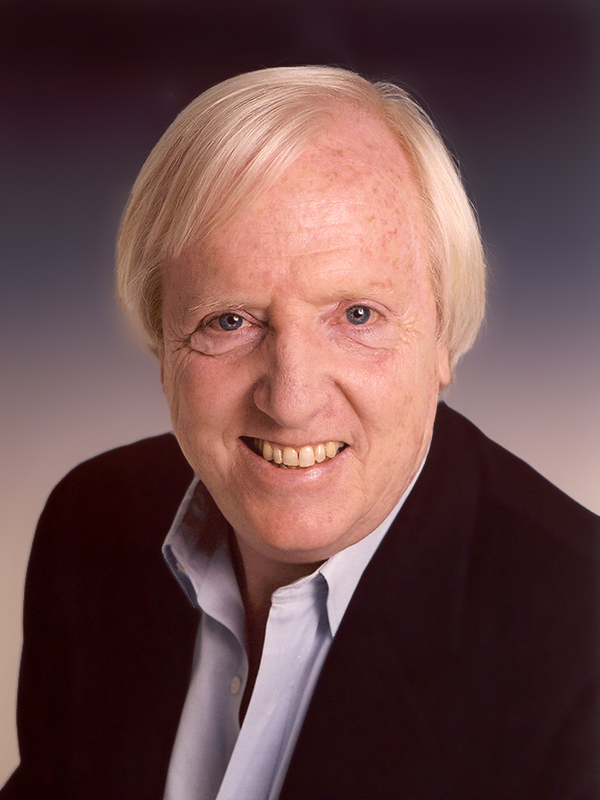
- Education: University of Georgia; Vanderbilt University; The George Washington University
- Occupations: Speaker, author, consultant
- Known for: Customer forensics, Customer journey mapping Service innovation

Chip R. Bell is an American author and consultant specializing in customer service and loyalty. He is known for developing methods for customer journey mapping and customer forensics.

== Education ==
Chip Bell obtained his bachelor's degree in psychology and political science from the University of Georgia, a masters in Behavioral Science from Vanderbilt University, and a doctorate in Organizational Behavior/Human Resource Development from The George Washington University.

== Military service ==
Chip Bell served as an infantry unit commander with the 82nd Airborne Division during the Vietnam War, and was a guerilla tactics instructor at the U.S. Army Infantry School at Fort Benning. Bell received two Bronze Stars, two Purple Hearts, and two Air Medals.

== Publications ==
Bell has authored or co-authored twenty-four books. In February 2017, Bell published a book titled Kaleidoscope: Delivering Innovative Service that Sparkles. His works include Inside Your Customer's Imagination: 5 Secrets for Creating Breakthrough Products, Services, and Solutions (2020).

== Bibliography ==
- Inside Your Customer's Imagination: 5 Secrets for Creating Breakthrough Products, Services, and Solutions Berrett-Koehler Publishers (2020); ISBN 9781523090204.
- Book Mark: How to Be an Author Georgia Writer's Museum (2019); ISBN 0692069151.
- Kaleidoscope: Delivering Innovative Service that Sparkles Greenleaf Book Group (2017); ISBN 9781626343948
- Sprinkles: Creating Awesome Experiences Through Innovative Service Greenleaf Book Group (2015); ISBN 1626341753
- Managers as Mentors: Building Partnerships for Learning, 3rd Edition (with Marshall Goldsmith), Berrett-Koehler Publishers (2013); ISBN 9781576750438
- The 9½ Principles of Innovative Service, Simple Truths (2013)
- Wired and Dangerous: How Your Customers Have Changed and What to Do About It (with John R. Patterson), Berrett-Koehler Publishers (2011); ISBN 9781605099750.
- Take Their Breath Away: How Imaginative Service Creates Devoted Customers with John R. Patterson, John Wiley & Sons (2009)
- Customer Loyalty Guaranteed: Create, Lead and Sustain Remarkable Customer Service (with John R. Patterson), Adams Business (2007); ISBN 1-59869-468-5
- Magnetic Service: Secrets for Creating Passionately Devoted Customers (with Bilijack R. Bell), Berrett-Koehler Publishers (2006); ISBN 9781576753750.
- Beep! Beep!: Competing in the Age of the Road Runner (with Oren Harari), Warner Books (2000); ISBN 0-446-52353-4
- Knock Your Socks Off Service Recovery with Ron Zemke AMACOM (2000)
- Service Magic: The Art of Amazing Your Customers (with Ron Zemke), Dearborn Trade (2003); ISBN 0-7931-6467-2
- Customer Love: Attracting and Keeping Customers for Life Executive Excellence Publishing (2001); ISBN 1-890009-78-4
- Dance Lessons: Six Steps to Great Partnership in Business and Life (with Heather Shea), Berrett-Koehler Publishers (1998); ISBN 9781576750438.
- Customers as Partners-Building Relationships That Last: Building Relationships That Last, Berrett-Koehler Publishers (1994); ISBN 9781881052548.
- Managing Knock Your Socks Off Service with Ron Zemke, AMACOM (1992)
- Service Wisdom: Creating and Maintaining the Customer Service Edge (with Ron Zemke), Lakewoods Pubns (1989); ISBN 0-943210-08-9
- Understanding Training: Perspectives and Practices (with Fredric Margolis), Pfeiffer & Co (1989); ISBN 0-88390-226-5
- The Trainer’s Professional Development Handbook (with Ray Bard and Leslie Stephen), Wiley (publisher) (1987); ISBN 1-55542-067-2
- Instructing for Results (with Fredric Margolis), Pfeiffer & Co (1986); ISBN 0-88390-196-X
- Clients and Consultants: Meeting and Exceeding Expectations (with Leonard Nadler), UNKNO (1985); ISBN 0-87201-119-4

== Awards ==
- Top 30 Thought Leaders in North America - Leadership Excellence Magazine
- Leadership 500 Excellence Award, 2016
- Leadership Excellence 100 Top Thought Leaders for 2008
- 2018 Bronze Stevie Award for Innovative Customer Service Training Design

== Book awards ==
- Bronze Award for Business Innovation Books, Axiom Business Book Awards (2021)
- Bronze Award for Top Sales Book, Axiom Business Book Awards (2012)
- Silver Award for Top Business/Career/Sales; Independent Publisher Awards (2011)
- Top Business Book; Benjamin Franklin Award Winner; IBPA (2004)
- Finalist, National Indie Excellence Award (2018)
- Best Book Award - Business: Marketing & Advertising (2017); AmericanBookFest
- Benjamin Franklin Award (2004); Independent Book Publishers Association
