= Booz Allen Hamilton (disambiguation) =

Booz Allen Hamilton may refer to:

- Booz Allen Hamilton, a strategy and technology consulting firm serving US federal, state, and local government entities.
- Booz Allen Classic, a former PGA Tour golf event sponsored by Booz Allen Hamilton.
- Strategy&, formerly known as Booz & Company, a global management consulting firm now part of PricewaterhouseCoopers.
