= Hesselbein =

Hesselbein is a surname. Notable people with the surname include:

- Dianne Hesselbein (born 1971), American politician
- Frances Hesselbein (1915–2022), American writer and management consultant
