= Kurtzman =

Kurtzman is a surname. Notable people with the surname include:

- Alex Kurtzman (born 1973), American film and television screenwriter and producer
- David Kurtzman (1904–1977), American university Chancellor
- Harvey Kurtzman (1924–1993), American cartoonist and editor of several comic books and magazines
- Joel Kurtzman (1947–2016), American economist and novelist
- Jeffrey Kurtzman, American musicologist and music editor
- Katy Kurtzman (born 1965), American actress
- Robert Kurtzman (born 1964), American film director, producer, screenwriter, and special effects creator

== See also ==
- Lemon v. Kurtzman, a legal case
