= Katzenbach Partners =

Defunct American management consultancy company

- Type: Partnership
- Industry: Management consulting
- Founded: 1998
- Founders: Marc Feigen, Jon Katzenbach, Niko Canner
- Fate: Acquired 2009
- Successor: Booz & Company
- Headquarters: New York City, United States
- Number of employees: 150 (2008)
- Website: katzenbach.com

Katzenbach Partners was a small American management consulting firm. In 2009 it became a part of the global management consulting firm Booz & Company.

== History ==
Katzenbach Partners was founded in 1998 by former McKinsey & Company consultants Niko Canner, Marc A. Feigen, and Jon Katzenbach. At its largest, the firm employed over 150 consultants in four offices (New York City, Houston, Chicago, and San Francisco).

The firm's most notable contributions were at the intersection of strategy and organizational performance theory, with significant research dedicated to social networks within companies and the importance of the informal organization.

== Notable press coverage ==
- In 2007, Fortune Magazine published a feature titled "The Hidden Workplace" that showcased Katzenbach Partners' methodology for mapping and understanding the informal networks within corporations and organizations.
- In 2007, a survey of more than 3,600 consultants performed by career information site Vault.com ranked Katzenbach Partners as one of the "Top 50 Most Prestigious Firms" (#18), one of the "20 Best Firms to Work For" (#15) and one of the "Best 20 For Diversity" (#3)
- In 2006, a Financial Times article titled "China's Unique Generation" detailed a 20-year study initiated by Katzenbach Partners entitled "China 2024: A New Generation of Leaders," which seeks to track the personal and professional lives of 110 Chinese MBA students who received their degrees in 2004.
- In 2005, A Fast Company article titled "Consultant, Heal Thyself" described the creation of Katzenbach Partners as "a quiet experiment unfolding in the realm of organization building."
- In 2004, Consulting Magazine selected Katzenbach Partners as one of its "Seven Small Jewels," an annual listing of firms with 200 or less employees "that have distinguished themselves inside the consulting marketplace through any number of innovative approaches, whether they be related to recruiting, client service or thought leadership."

== Alumni ==
- Niko Canner, Founder and CEO of Incandescent, formerly Management Committee of Bridgewater Associates
- Marc Feigen, CEO Feigen Advisors
- Jon Katzenbach, Senior Partner, Booz & Company
- Claire Chambers, CEO Journelle
- Timothy M. Keller, Mayor, Albuquerque, New Mexico; State Senator, New Mexico
- Leila Janah, founder and CEO of Samasource and LXMI
- Matt Anderson, Chief Digital Officer & President at Arrow Electronics
