= Kelly Goldsmith =

American marketing researcher

- Born: San Diego, California
- Other name: Kelly Ann Shriner
- Education: Duke University; Yale University
- Occupation: Professor
- Employer: Vanderbilt University
- Known for: Survivor: Africa
- Spouse: Reid Shriner (m. 2013)
- Children: 2
- Parent(s): Marshall Goldsmith (father); Lyda Goldsmith (mother)
- Website: profgoldsmith.com

Kelly Goldsmith is an American marketing researcher who specializes in consumer behavior and a former reality television contestant. She is currently the E. Bronson Ingram Chair and Professor of Marketing at the Owen Graduate School of Management at Vanderbilt University. She also serves as the Faculty Director of the Hoogland Undergraduate Business Program and the Ingram Scholars Program.

== Career ==
Goldsmith was born and raised in San Diego, California. Her father, Marshall Goldsmith, is an executive leadership coach. She graduated from Duke University in 2001 with a B.A. in sociology. Goldsmith obtained her Ph.D., M. Phil. and M.A. in marketing from Yale University completing her studies in 2009. After graduation she worked as an assistant professor at Northwestern University's Kellogg School of Management.

Goldsmith has been a professor of marketing at the Owen Graduate School of Management at Vanderbilt University since 2017. Her areas of research include human responses to scarcity and uncertainty. She has appeared as a commentator in numerous publications on the topic of consumer panic buying in relation to COVID-19. She previously gave a talk in Ted^{x}Nashville talk in 2019 titled "How to make the most out of not having enough". She has also served on the editorial boards of Journal of Marketing Research and the Journal of Consumer Research.

== Survivor ==
=== Africa ===
In 2001, Goldsmith appeared as a contestant on the third season of the American television reality show Survivor as part of the cast of Survivor: Africa. She was initially placed on the Boran tribe alongside Clarence Black, Tom Buchanan, Jessie Camacho, Kim Johnson, Diane Ogden, Lex van den Berghe and Ethan Zohn.

Kelly played the game quietly in the beginning, avoiding being eliminated the first two times Boran attended tribal council through her fairly strong social bonds.

On day 13, the show's first-ever tribe switch took place, with Goldsmith, Buchanan and van den Berghe changing to the Samburu tribe, joining Kim Powers, Brandon Quinton and Lindsey Richter. Both groups of three spent time trying to identify which person on the other group had previous votes cast against them, as by this season, if a tie occurs then whoever had the most previous votes would be eliminated. At the following challenge, Goldsmith's former tribemate, Johnson, made an "L" signal to her, which told her that Richter had previous votes and would be eliminated if she was in a tie. However the plan had to wait as they won the immunity challenge. At the following immunity challenge, Samburu lost and the original Boran members voted Richter, which got her eliminated.

On day 20, both tribes merged into the Moto Maji tribe with the original Boran being up in numbers 6-4. However, van den Berghe first decided to eliminate Clarence Black as many people didn't get along with him, with van den Berghe receiving two votes at that tribal council with Black receiving eight. The following day, van den Berghe became paranoid as he furiously tried to identify who cast a vote against him other than Black, with Goldsmith taking the blame, despite it actually being Teresa Cooper. While she tried flipping to save herself, Goldsmith was voted out on Day 24 after being falsely accused in a 5-4 vote, finishing in ninth place and being the first member of the jury.

At the final tribal council, she asked finalists Zohn and Johnson to pick a number between one and one thousand, and with Ethan being closer to 568 (the number of the room in The Graduate), she voted for him to win, which he would achieve in a 5-2 vote.

=== Post-show ===
Goldsmith later became a casting director for CBS and helped build the cast of Survivor: Vanuatu, Survivor's ninth season.

== Personal life ==
After Survivor: Africa, Goldsmith married Reid Shriner. Together, they have twin children.

== Awards and accomplishments ==
- Woman of Influence, Nashville Business Journal, 2026
- SEC Academic Leadership Development Program, 2023-2024
- Research Productivity Award, 2021
- Marketing Science Institute (MSI) Scholar, 2020
- Chancellors Faculty Fellow, 2020-2022
- Vanderbilt Strong Grant Winner, 2020
- Dean's Award for Teaching Winner, 2020
- Provost Research Studio Grant Winner, 2019
- Outstanding Prof. of the Year Award Nominee, 2013, 2019, 2020
- JCR Outstanding Reviewer Award, 2017-2018
- Faculty Impact Award Winner, 2017
- Marketing Science Institute (MSI) Young Scholar, 2015
- Research Chair (Clewett, 2012; McManus, 2014)
- Sidney J. Levy Award for Excellence in Teaching, 2012, 2014
- Levy and Weitz AMA Dissertation Competition Winner, 2009

== Select publications ==
- Savary, Jennifer; Goldsmith, Kelly (September 2020). "Unobserved altruism: How self-signaling motivations and social benefits shape willingness to donate". Journal of Experimental Psychology: Applied. 26 (3): 538–550. doi:10.1037/xap0000261. PMID 31916807. S2CID 210120034.
- Cannon, Christopher; Goldsmith, Kelly; Roux, Caroline (January 2019). "A Self-Regulatory Model of Resource Scarcity". Journal of Consumer Psychology. 29 (1): 104–127. doi:10.1002/jcpy.1035. S2CID 151810437.
- Goldsmith, Kelly; Roux, Caroline; Ma, Jingjing (15 December 2017). "When Seeking the Best Brings Out the Worst in Consumers: Understanding the Relationship between a Maximizing Mindset and Immoral Behavior". Journal of Consumer Psychology. 28 (2): 293–309. doi:10.1002/jcpy.1017.
- Roux, Caroline; Goldsmith, Kelly; Bonezzi, Andrea (2015). "On the psychology of scarcity: When reminders of resource scarcity promote selfish (and generous) behavior". Journal of Consumer Research. 42 (4): 615–631.
- Meyvis, Tom; Goldsmith, Kelly; Dhar, Ravi (1 April 2012). "The Importance of the Context in Brand Extension: How Pictures and Comparisons Shift Consumers' Focus from Fit to Quality". Journal of Marketing Research. 49 (2): 206–217. doi:10.1509/jmr.08.0060. ISSN 0022-2437. S2CID 3340534.
- Goldsmith, Kelly; Amir, On (1 December 2010). "Can Uncertainty Improve Promotions?". Journal of Marketing Research. 47 (6): 1070–1077. doi:10.1509/jmkr.47.6.1070. S2CID 143917561.
- Goldsmith, Marshall; Goldsmith, Kelly (2009). "How Happiness Happens". Bloomberg BusinessWeek. 92. Bloomberg L.P. ISSN 0007-7135.
