= Gary Gates =

American demographer

Gary J. Gates is a retired American demographer. He served as the Blachford-Cooper Distinguished Scholar at the UCLA School of Law's Williams Institute, of which he was also the research director. He is an expert on the demography of LGBT populations in the United States. Prior to becoming a demographer, he worked as a software engineer and seminarian.

== Education ==
Gates received his B.S. from the Johnstown branch of the University of Pittsburgh, his M.Div. from St. Vincent College, and his Ph.D. from Carnegie Mellon University.

== Work ==
Gates is the co-author of the 2004 book The Gay and Lesbian Atlas. In 2013, he wrote an amicus brief for the Supreme Court of the United States case United States v. Windsor in which he outlined a number of statistics about same-sex couples in the United States. According to the Washington Post, one of these statistics was that "about one in five gay and lesbian couples are raising children under age 18".

== Personal life ==
Gates, who is gay, lives in Ireland with his husband.
