= The Death of Money =

1993 book by Joel Kurtzman

The Death of Money: How the Electronic Economy Has Destabilized the World's Markets and Created Financial Chaos
- Author: Joel Kurtzman
- Language: English
- Genre: Economics
- Publisher: Simon & Schuster
- Publication date: 1993
- Publication place: United States
- ISBN: 9780671687991

The Death of Money is a 1993 book (and an article with the same title) by Joel Kurtzman, a former editor of Harvard Business Review. Kurtzman uses the "death of money" to refer to a change in the economic nature of money in the United States following Richard Nixon's removal of US dollar from the gold standard (as in the Bretton Woods system), informally referred to as the Nixon shock.

The concept of "death of money" also refers to the fundamental change in the nature of business transactions based on a complex, electronically managed system of valuations used for stocks, bonds, insurance policies, and other financial contracts that go beyond the simple, historic notion of money representing physical reserves. A simple view of this concept is that if everyone decides to cash out their bank account on a single day, there is no longer enough paper money to represent it.

Kurtzman discussed how the new electronic financial economy allows for new trends in securitization (e.g., the inclusion of mortgage-backed securities into compound and complex financial instruments), and warned of possible financial reversals.
