= University of Pittsburgh at Johnstown =

Public university in Johnstown, Pennsylvania, US

Coordinates: 40°16′03″N 78°50′06″W

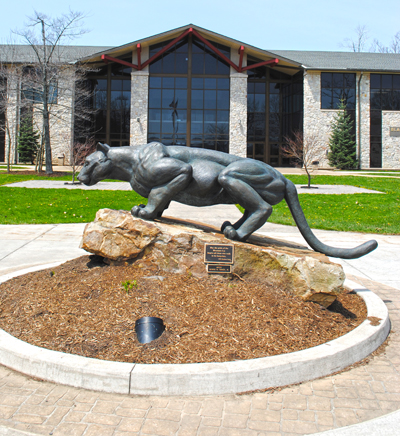
- Mountain Cat statue outside Blackington Hall
- Former names: Johnstown Junior College of the University of Pittsburgh; Johnstown College of the University of Pittsburgh
- Motto: Veritas et Virtus (Latin)
- Motto in English: Truth and Virtue
- Type: Regional campus of the University of Pittsburgh
- Established: September 24, 1927
- Endowment: $37.1 million
- President: Jem Spectar
- Faculty: 149
- Students: 2,462
- Location: Richland Township, Cambria County, Pennsylvania, United States
- Campus: Rural, wooded. 655 acres (2.65 km^{2})
- Colors: Pitt Royal and Pitt Gold
- Nickname: Mountain Cats
- Sporting affiliations: NCAA Division II – PSAC
- Website: johnstown.pitt.edu

The University of Pittsburgh at Johnstown (UPJ or Pitt-Johnstown) is a state-related college in Richland Township, Cambria County, Pennsylvania, near the city of Johnstown. A baccalaureate degree-granting, regional campus of the University of Pittsburgh, UPJ was founded in 1927 as one of the first regional campuses of a major university in the United States.

== History ==
The University of Pittsburgh first established a presence in the area prior to World War I, when the Johnstown School Board asked the university to offer continuing education courses at extension class sites in local teachers' institutions. By 1926, a more permanent relationship was sought by the school board, and UPJ was officially founded as a two-year college of the University of Pittsburgh on September 24, 1927. Throughout the 1920s and 1930s it held classes in the Johnstown High School building in the Kernville neighborhood which adjoins downtown Johnstown. After World War II, the Johnstown College moved to the Moxham section of the city where the number of courses and students increased. In the early 1960s, community leaders worked with the University of Pittsburgh to build a new campus in suburban Richland Township. The new campus opened in 1967 with two classroom buildings, five dormitories, and a student union. Degree-granting status was awarded to UPJ by the University of Pittsburgh in 1970. The campus has grown significantly since that time with five academic buildings, a library, an expanded student union, a sports and aquatic center, a conference center, a chapel, a performing arts center, and a large cluster of dormitories, lodges, townhouse apartments and other student residence housing. UPJ now offers over 40 baccalaureate and associate degree programs.

== Academics ==
UPJ offers a Bachelor of Arts and a Bachelor of Science degree in over 40 areas of study in seven academic divisions, as well as offering the ability to obtain a Master of Social Work degree, several associate degrees in the allied health area, as well as certificate programs. The college offers 44 undergraduate majors, with minors available in most of the major fields, as well as in other areas of arts and sciences. The average class size is 18, and the student to teacher ratio is 14:1. The college is strictly undergraduate, and all courses are taught by college faculty. Special opportunities include internships, the President's Scholars program, independent and directed studies, a self-designed major, the Freshman Seminar Series, an International Studies Certificate, and the Academic Success Center.

Pitt-Johnstown Academic Divisions
• Business and Enterprise
• Education
• Engineering and Computer Science
• Humanities
• Natural Sciences
• Nursing and Health Sciences
• Social Sciences

UPJ operates on a modified trimester calendar. The standard school year includes a 15-week fall term (September to mid-December) and a 15-week spring term (January to mid-April). Optional summer term offerings from 5-week to 15-week sessions allow students to accelerate their degrees.

The University of Pittsburgh, including UPJ and other regional campuses, is accredited by the Middle States Commission on Higher Education.

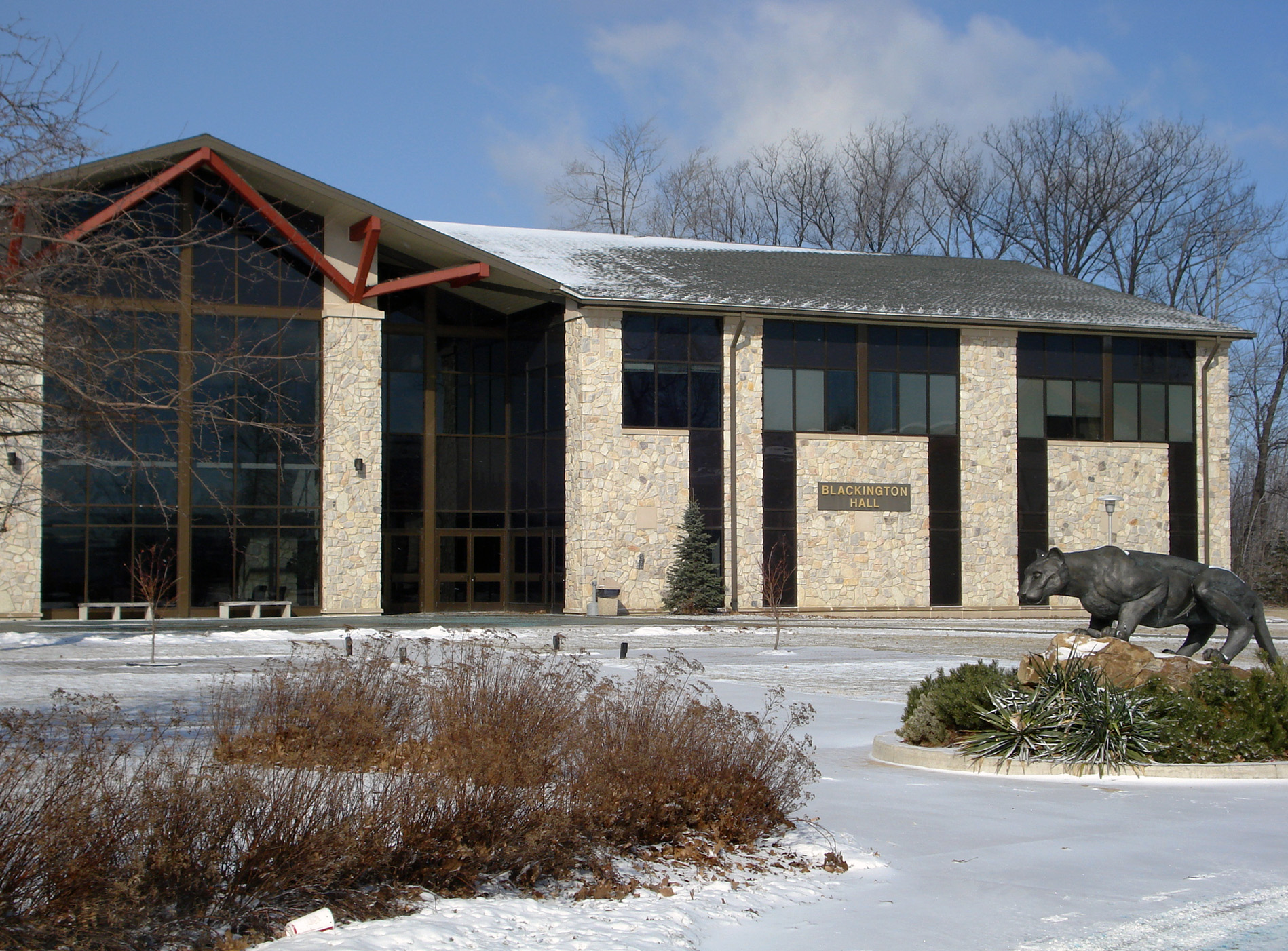
Blackington Hall in winter

U.S. News & World Report's 2021 edition of Best Regional Colleges - North ranked Pitt-Johnstown 31st (tie) overall. The college received the following specialty rankings:

Category	Ranking
Top Performers in Social Mobility	38
Top Public Schools	18

UPJ was also ranked 75th among baccalaureate colleges by Washington Monthly in 2020.

== Campus and facilities ==
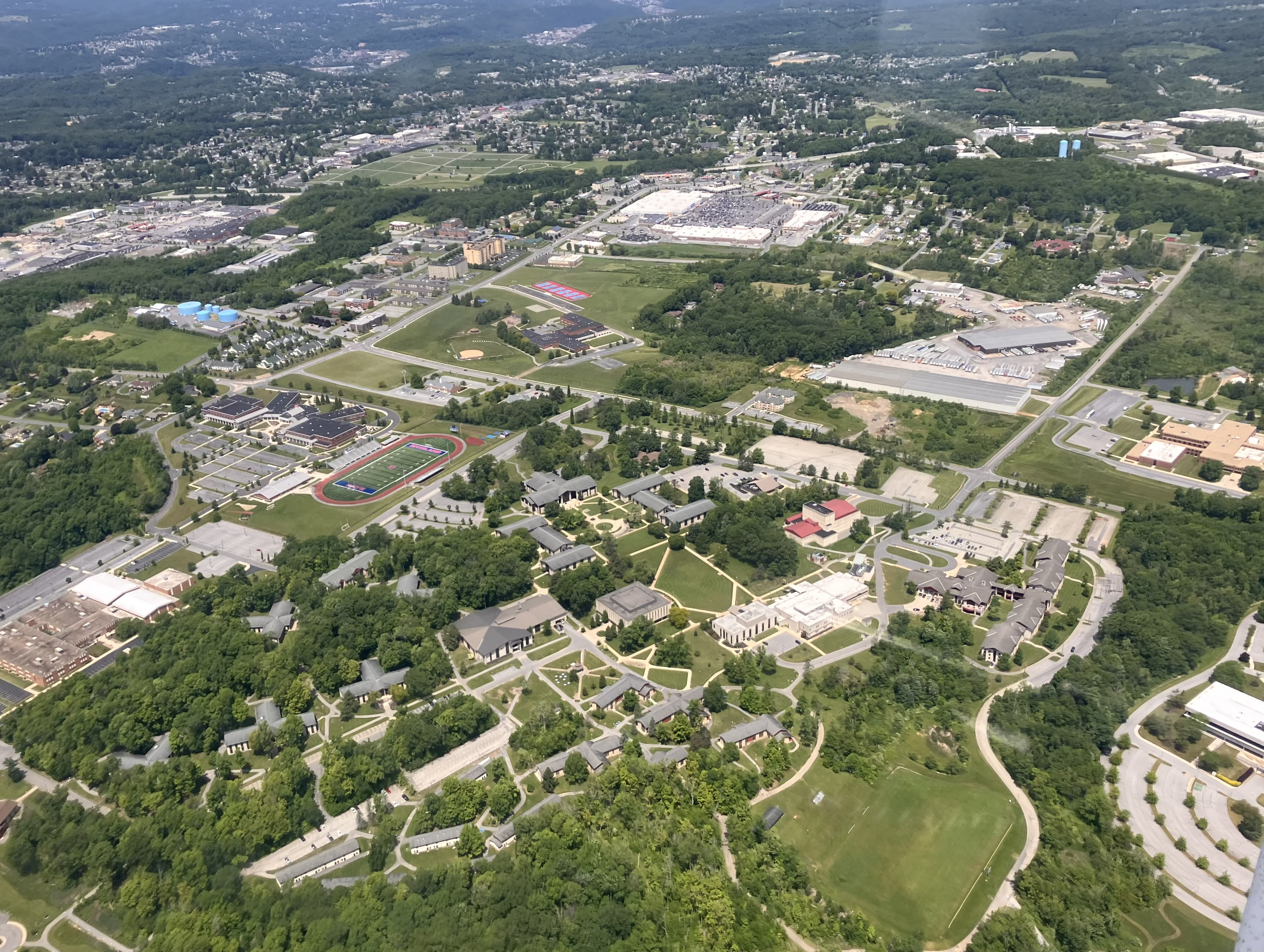
Aerial view of the university in 2024

The Pitt-Johnstown campus is situated in a suburban, wooded setting occupying 650 acres (2.6 km^{2}) which makes UPJ physically the third-largest campus in Pennsylvania. It is located eight miles (13 km) outside of Johnstown, Pennsylvania (metropolitan population of 110,000); 70 miles (110 km) east of Pittsburgh; and 175 miles (282 km) north of Washington, D.C.

The 32 campus buildings, mostly in freestone masonry, include resident housing, classroom buildings, a performing arts center, sports center, library, student union, and outdoor recreation areas. Other features include a 40-acre (160,000 m^{2}) nature preserve, more than 15 intramural activities, more than 70 student organizations, and NCAA Division II men's and women's sports.

The campus has six academic/administrative buildings: Biddle Hall, Krebs Hall, Murtha Engineering and Science Building, Blackington Administrative Classroom Building, Nursing and Health Sciences Building, and the Living/Learning Center. Each building contains classrooms, laboratories, faculty offices, and/or administrative offices. Additional facilities include a music room, greenhouse, computer rooms, auditoriums, an audio-visual classroom, and conference rooms.

Also available to students is the advanced technology classroom (ATC) in Biddle Hall. The room is designed for electronic distance learning. It is equipped with satellite down-link programming, three full-motion cameras, data ports, video monitors, and more.

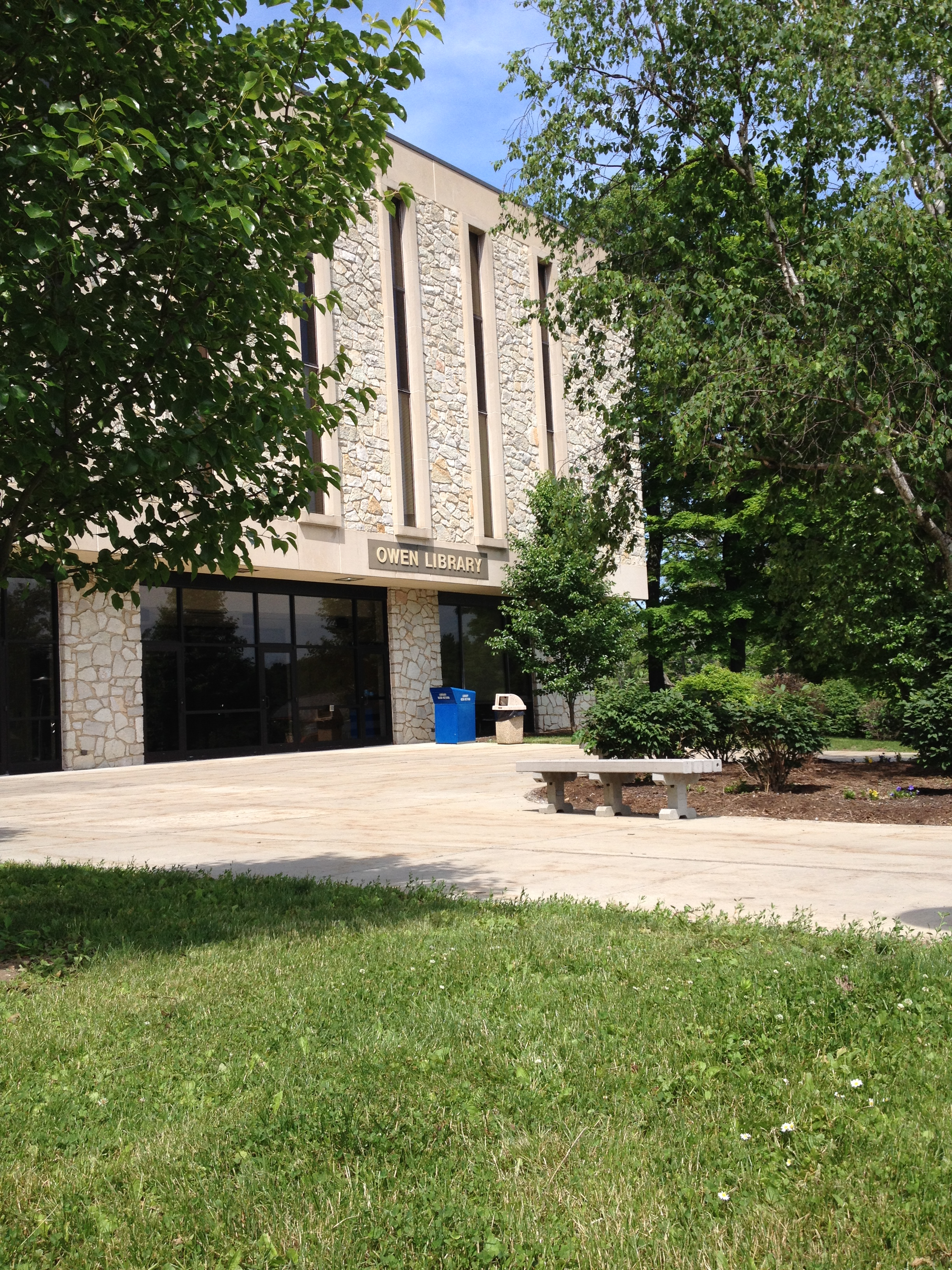
Owen Library

The Owen Library holds more than 146,086 bound volumes, 15,358 titles on microfilm, 625 periodical subscriptions, approximately 130 online subscription databases, and more than 4,500 electronic journals. All students have access to additional libraries on Pitt's other campuses.

The Student Union, located in the middle of campus, houses the Student Life Office, Health Services, Residence Services, Career Services, and the Bookstore/convenience store. Also included are a full-service mail room, a 400-person cafeteria, and several alternative dining options. The union also holds a game room, esports lounge, information desk, and many organizational offices. Located directly outside the cafeteria, a recently renovated late-night pizza restaurant offers a variety of options for late-night diners.

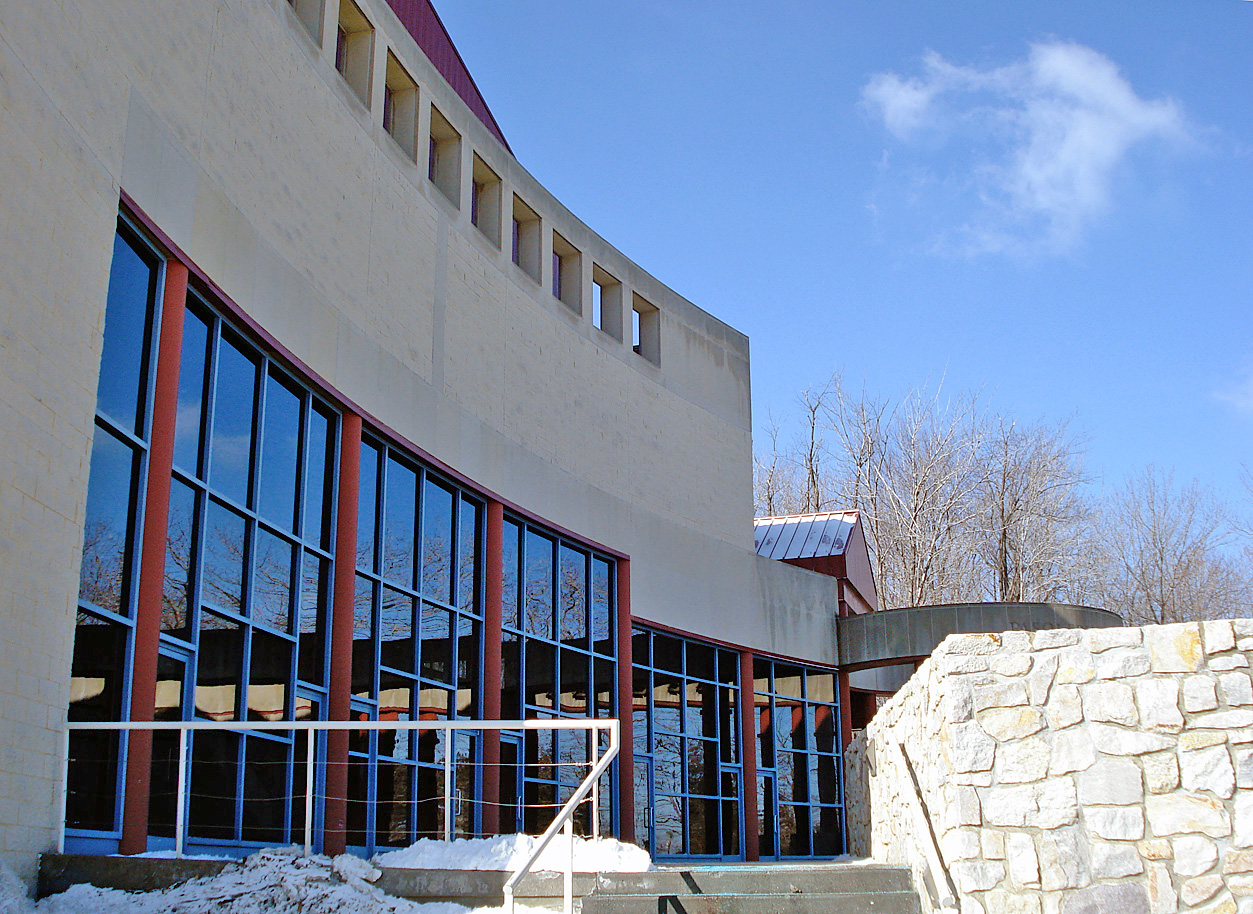
Pasquerilla Performing Arts Center

The Pasquerilla Performing Arts Center (PPAC) is a 42,000-square-foot (3,900 m^{2}) multipurpose facility; it was completed in 1991. It contains a 1,000-seat concert hall, a 200-seat black box theater, and supporting operational spaces. Performances include UPJ Department of Theatre Arts shows and Broadway productions. The PPAC is also home to the Johnstown Symphony Orchestra and the Southern Alleghenies Museum of Art at Johnstown. The art gallery displays at least eight exhibitions a year as well as work produced by UPJ students.

The J. Irving Whalley Memorial Chapel was constructed in 1991 as well. It is nondenominational and seats 250 people. Weekly Catholic mass and Protestant services are held, as well as personal conferences.

The Sports Center and Zamias Aquatic Center provide recreational facilities for more than 15 intramural sports, as well as intercollegiate activities. The building houses a 25-yard (23 m) indoor swimming pool, a workout room with free weights, an aerobic/dance studio, and locker rooms with showers. On January 5, 2011, the university opened the $9.7 million 40,000-square-foot (3,700 m^{2}) Wellness Center which is adjacent to the Sports Center The Wellness Center features a three-lane elevated running track, cardiovascular and strength-training equipment, dance/exercise/classroom space, two multipurpose courts for basketball and volleyball, an indoor climbing wall, as well as an outdoor wellness park.

In fall 2013, an approximately $12 million 26,000-square-foot (2,400 m^{2}) Nursing and Health Sciences Building was opened. The two-floor facility consists of 11 laboratories for chemistry and biology, a nursing simulation laboratory, two seminar rooms, and six faculty offices.

=== Student residences ===
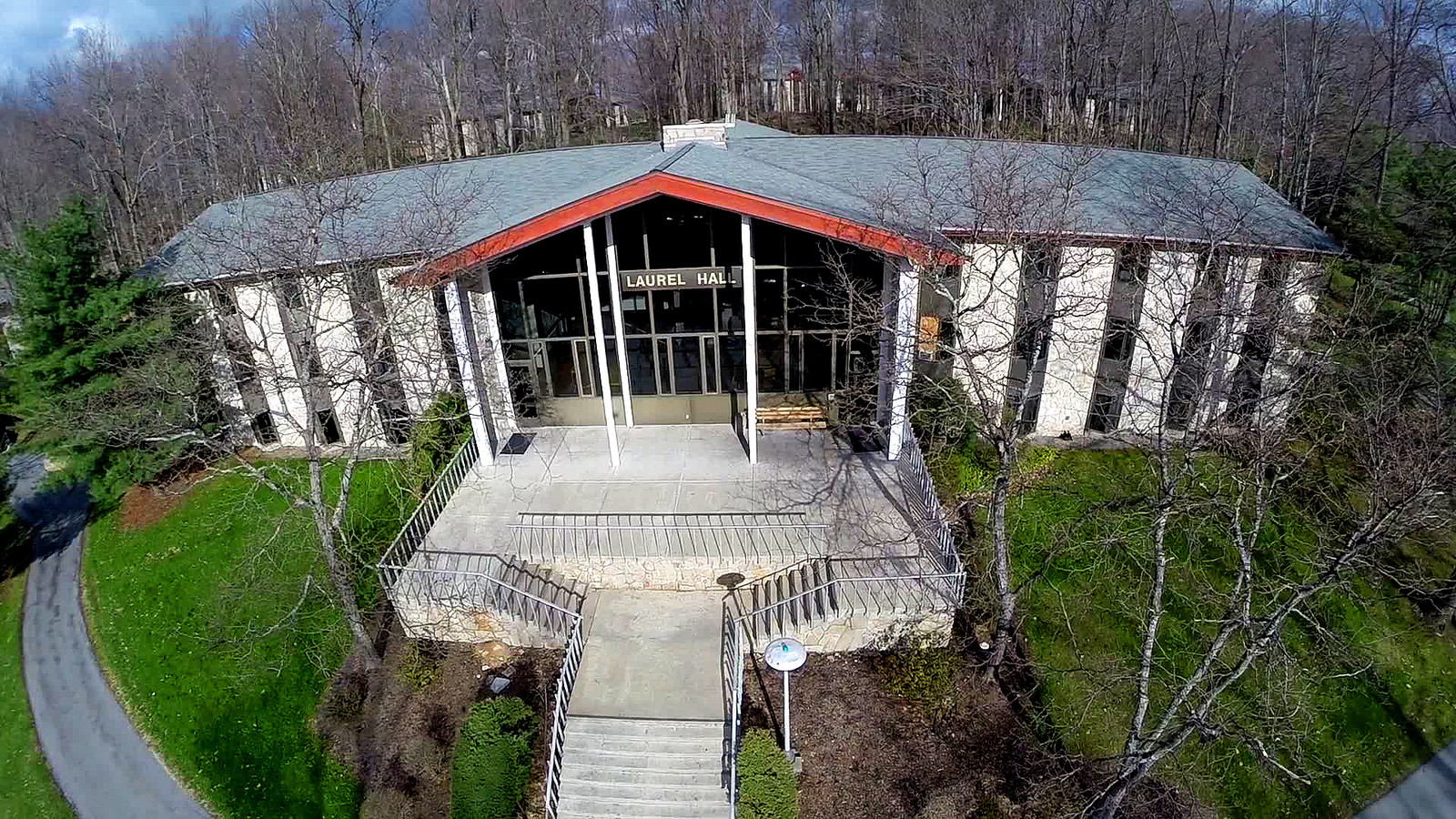
Laurel Hall is one of five first-year student residences

The Living/Learning Center, completed in 1994 and renovated in 2020, is a 400-person residence unit, which includes a study room, lounge area, dance practice room, and a smaller student cafeteria. The Living/Learning Center is used not only as a residence but also as a conference center throughout the year. With several meeting rooms, the facility can accommodate groups of 20–250 people.

In addition to the residence units in the Living/Learning Center, the campus offers the choice of single-sex and coeducational housing. There are 5 freshman residence halls, one upper-class residence hall, seven small-group lodges, 46 townhouse-style apartment units and two apartment complexes.

=== Heroes Memorial ===
Pitt-Johnstown is the home to The Heroes Memorial, which is located between Whalley Memorial Chapel and Blackington Hall. The memorial's centerpiece is a 3,500 pounds (1,600 kg) steel Ɪ-beam from the World Trade Center which is surrounded by 12 granite panels that are engraved with over 9,000 names of those who died in the September 11 attacks as well as the service men and women who have been killed in the wars in Afghanistan and Iraq. It was dedicated on November 11, 2011.

== Athletics ==
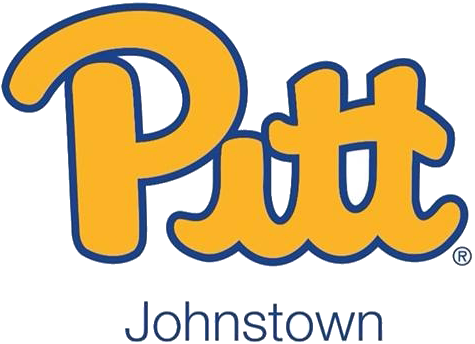
Pitt Johnstown athletics logo

The Pitt–Johnstown (UPJ) athletic teams are called the Mountain Cats. The university is a member of the NCAA Division II ranks, primarily competing in the Pennsylvania State Athletic Conference (PSAC) since the 2013–14 academic year, becoming that conference's first member from the Commonwealth System of Higher Education. The Mountain Cats previously competed as a member of the West Virginia Intercollegiate Athletic Conference (WVIAC) from 2006–07 to 2012–13.

UPJ competes in fifteen intercollegiate varsity sports: Men's sports include baseball, basketball, cross country, golf, soccer, track & field (indoor and outdoor) and wrestling; while women's sports include basketball, cross country, soccer, softball, track & field (indoor and outdoor) and volleyball. Former sports include men's ice hockey

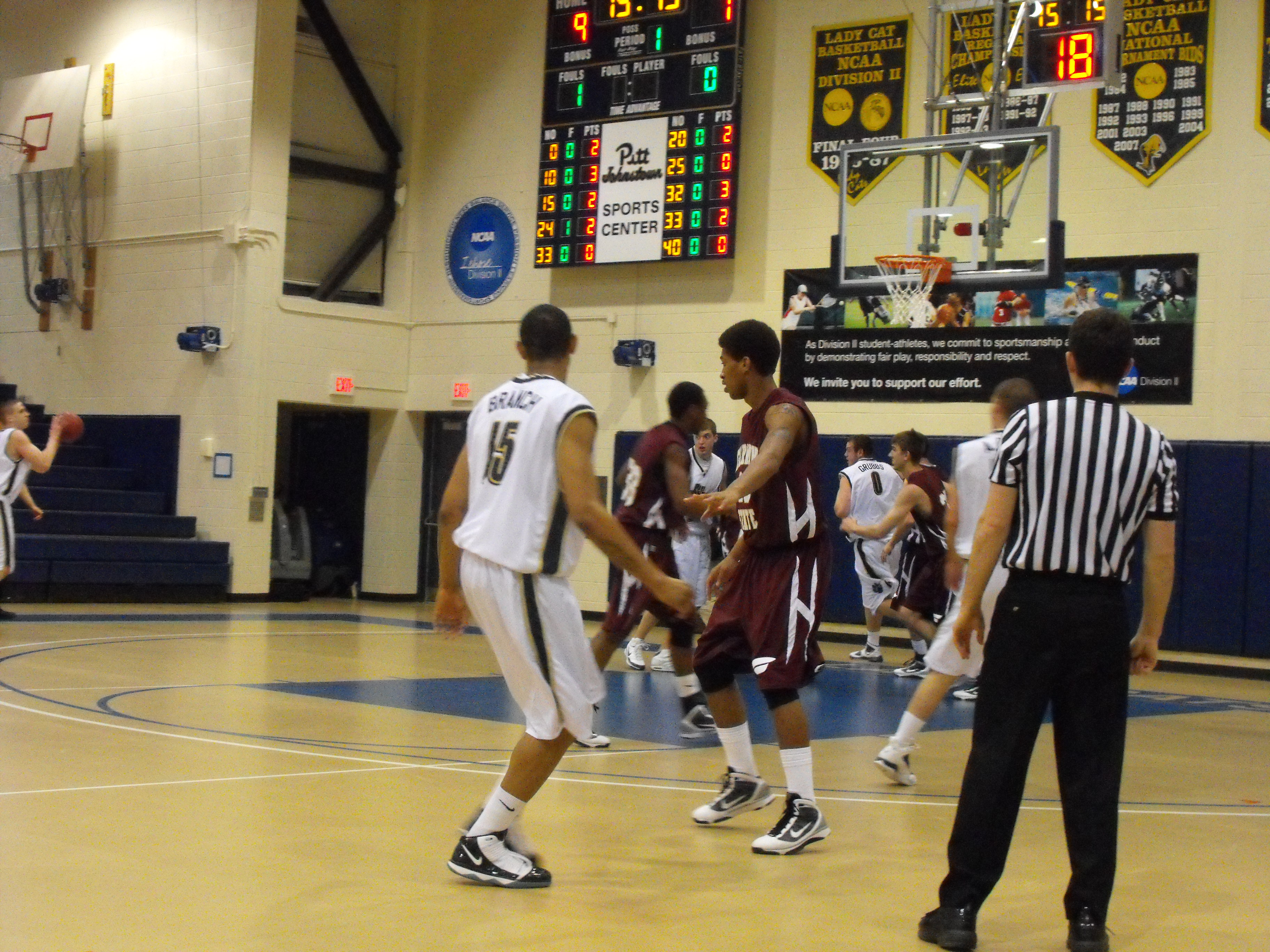
UPJ men's basketball game in 2010

Perhaps the most prominent sport at UPJ is wrestling, which has had several top national finishes and won the Division II National Championships in 1996 and 1999. The wrestling program also includes several highly decorated wrestlers among its former athletes, including the most decorated wrestler in NCAA history, Carlton Haselrig, who went undefeated during his career and won three Division I and three Division II individual national championships.

Men's Basketball is also successful and has advanced to five NCAA Men's Division II Basketball Tournaments, including appearances in the 1997, 1998, 2008, 2009, and 2023 tournaments. The men's basketball team has appeared in the Division II national rankings several times, and finished as high as fifth in the nation in 1999. Women's basketball at UPJ has appeared in 13 Division II and 3 Division III NCAA tournaments, including the 1987 Division II Final Four.

Women's volleyball has earned bids to the NCAA Division II tournament six times since 2013, including in 2024.

The baseball team plays some of its home games at Point Stadium. The baseball program participated in the NCAA North Atlantic Regional Tournament in the 2006 and 2008 seasons. On August 26, 2026, Braxton Roxby became the first Mountain Cat to reach Major League Baseball.

== Notable alumni ==
- Robert E. Casey – Pennsylvania Treasurer from 1977 to 1981
- Chris Dempsey – mixed martial artist
- Gary Gates – demographer
- Carlton Haselrig – former heavyweight collegiate wrestler and NFL player
- Frances Hesselbein – president and CEO of the Hesselbein Leadership Institute and former CEO of the Girl Scouts of the USA
- John Murtha – member of the United States House of Representatives
- Jenae Neiderhiser – behavior geneticist
- Braxton Roxby – professional baseball player
- John N. Wozniak – Pennsylvania State Senator

== Gallery ==
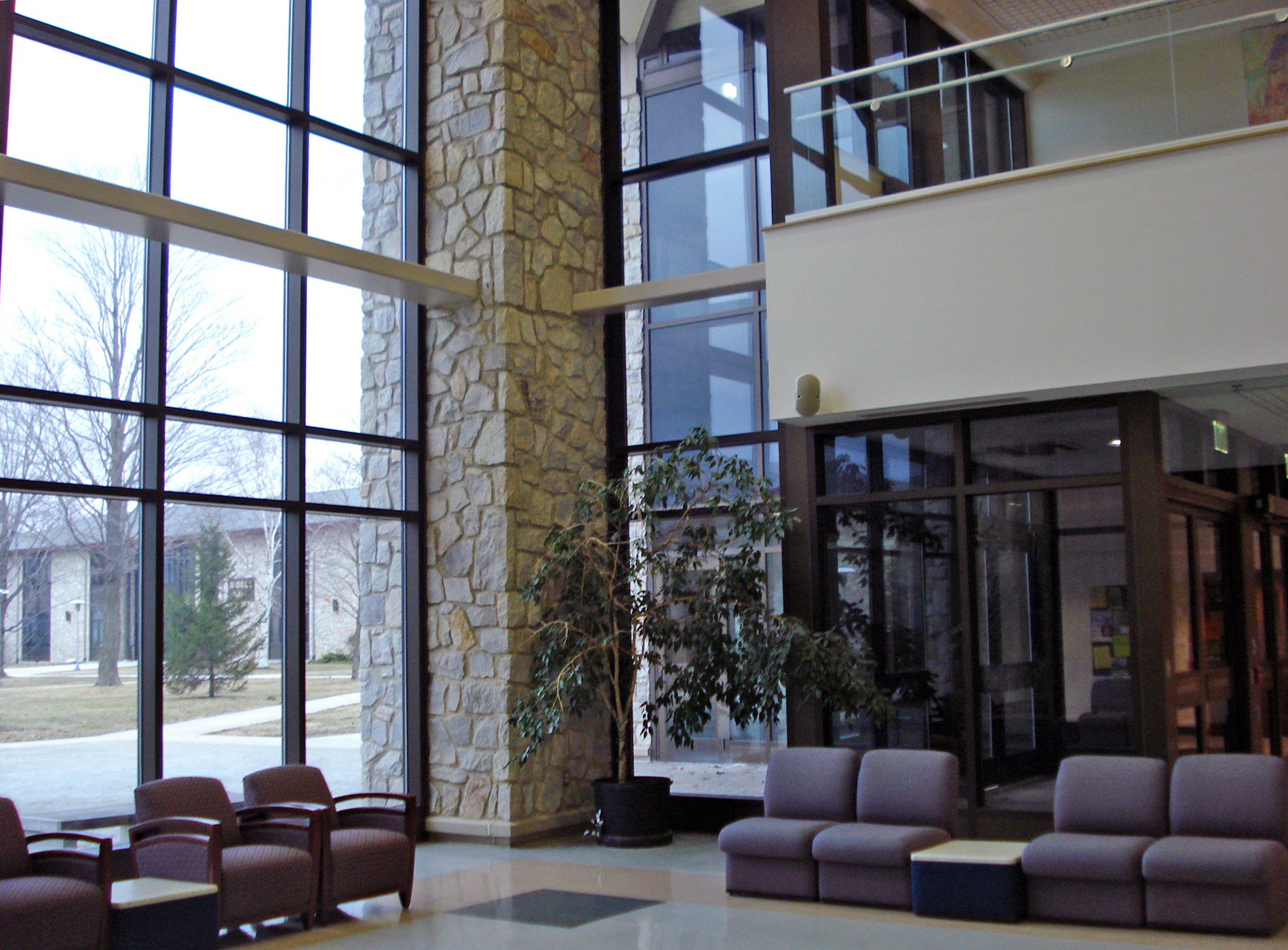
Interior lobby of Blackington Hall

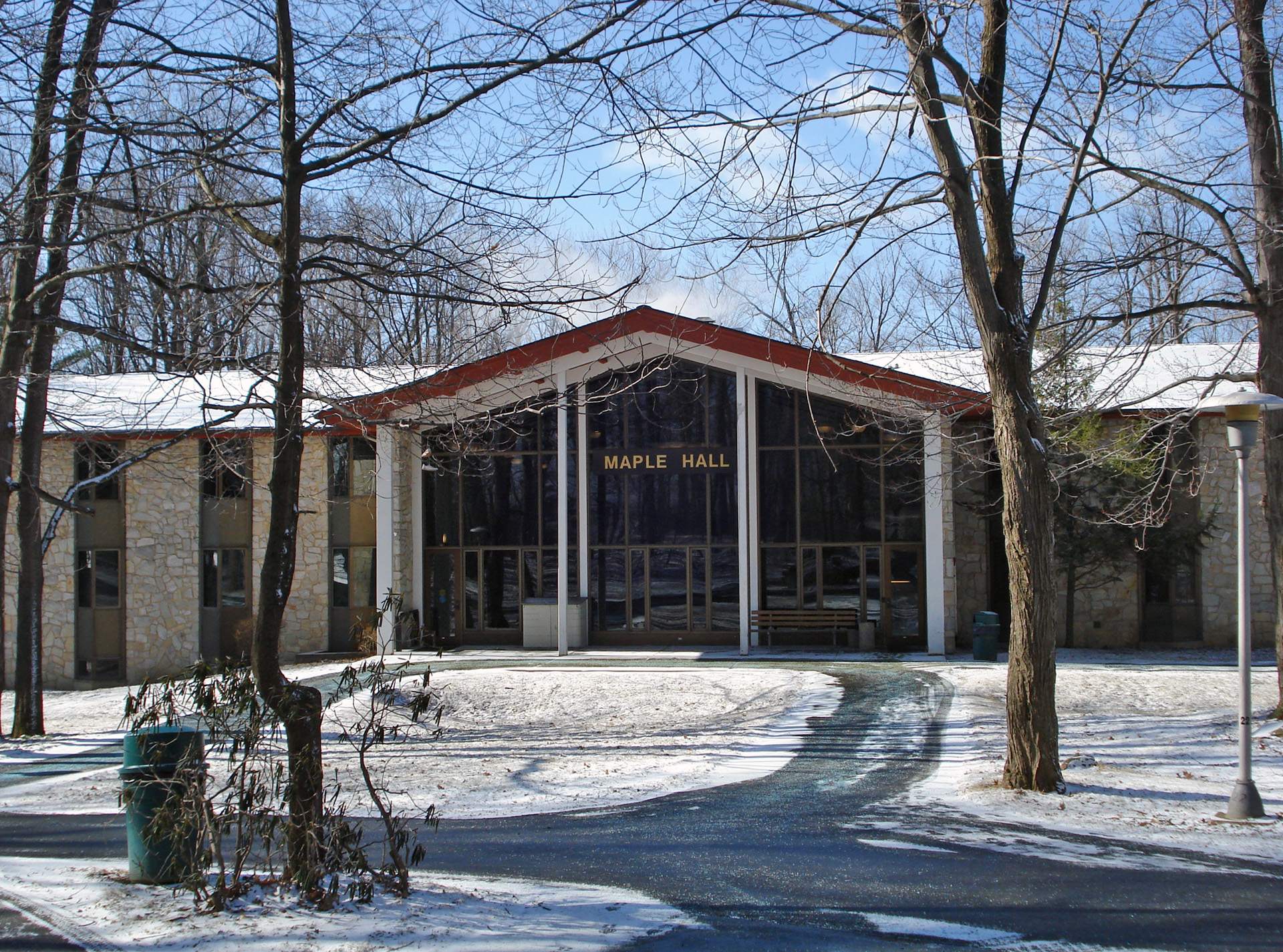
Maple Hall

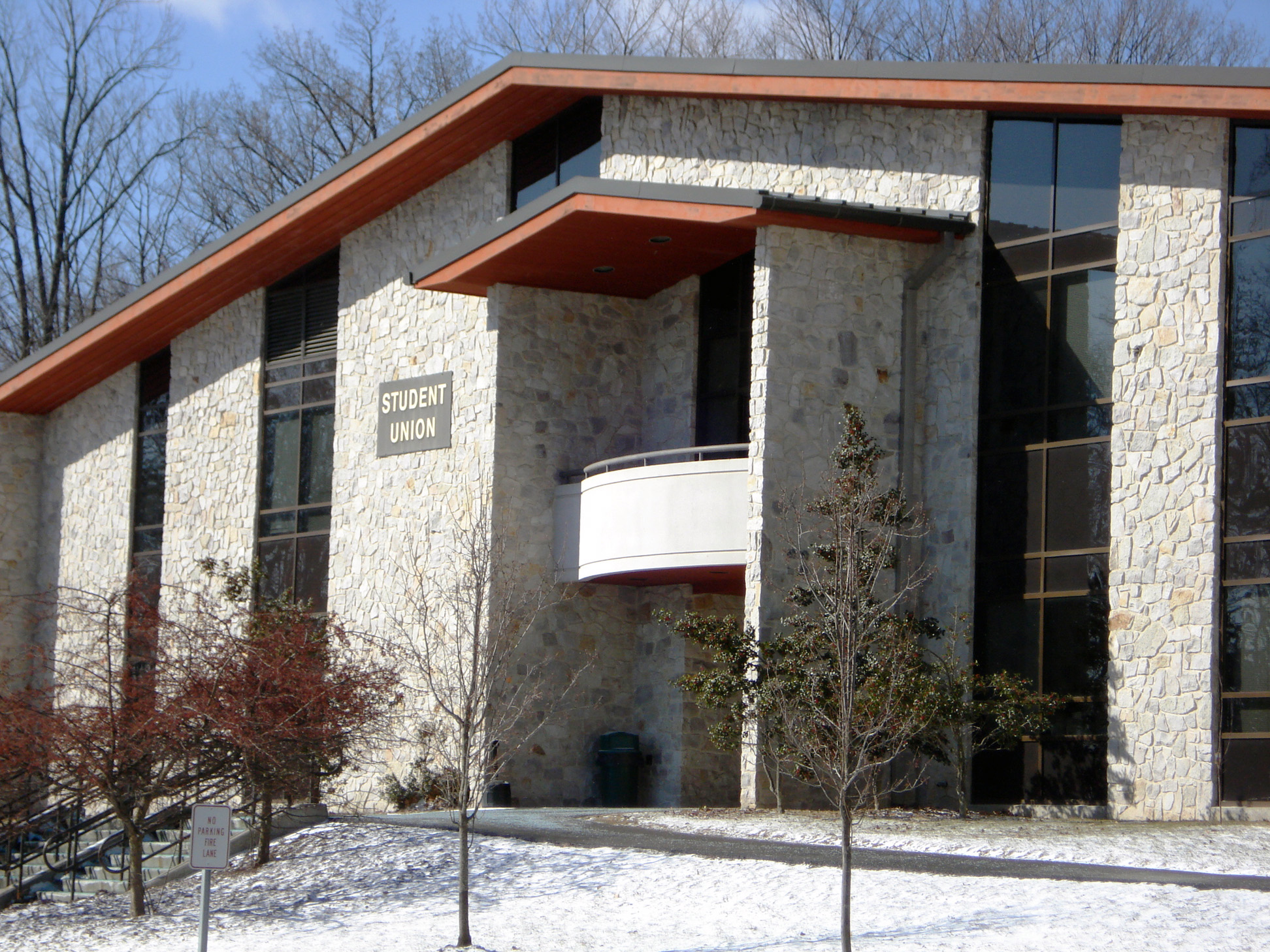
Student Union

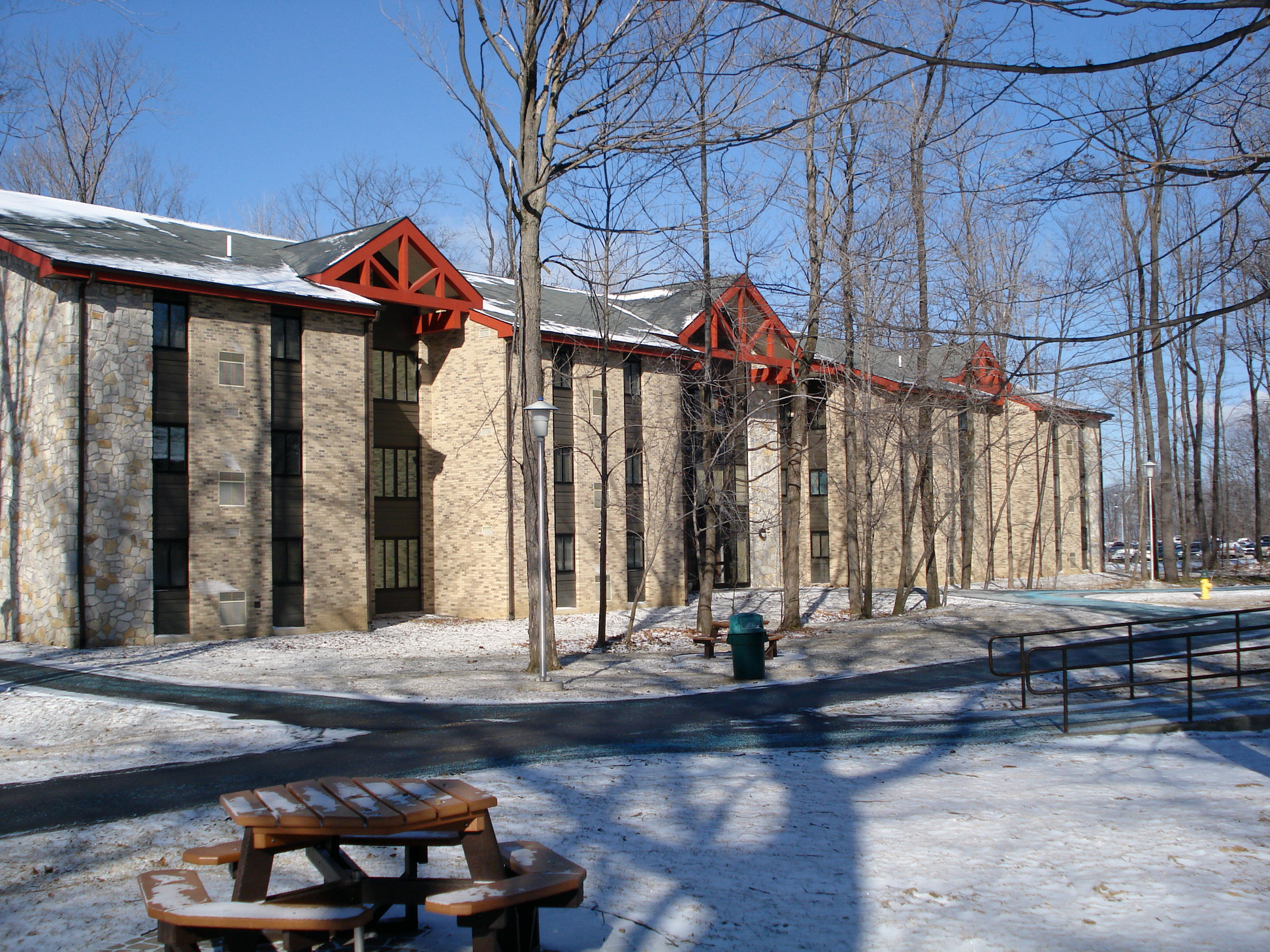
Willow Hall student residence

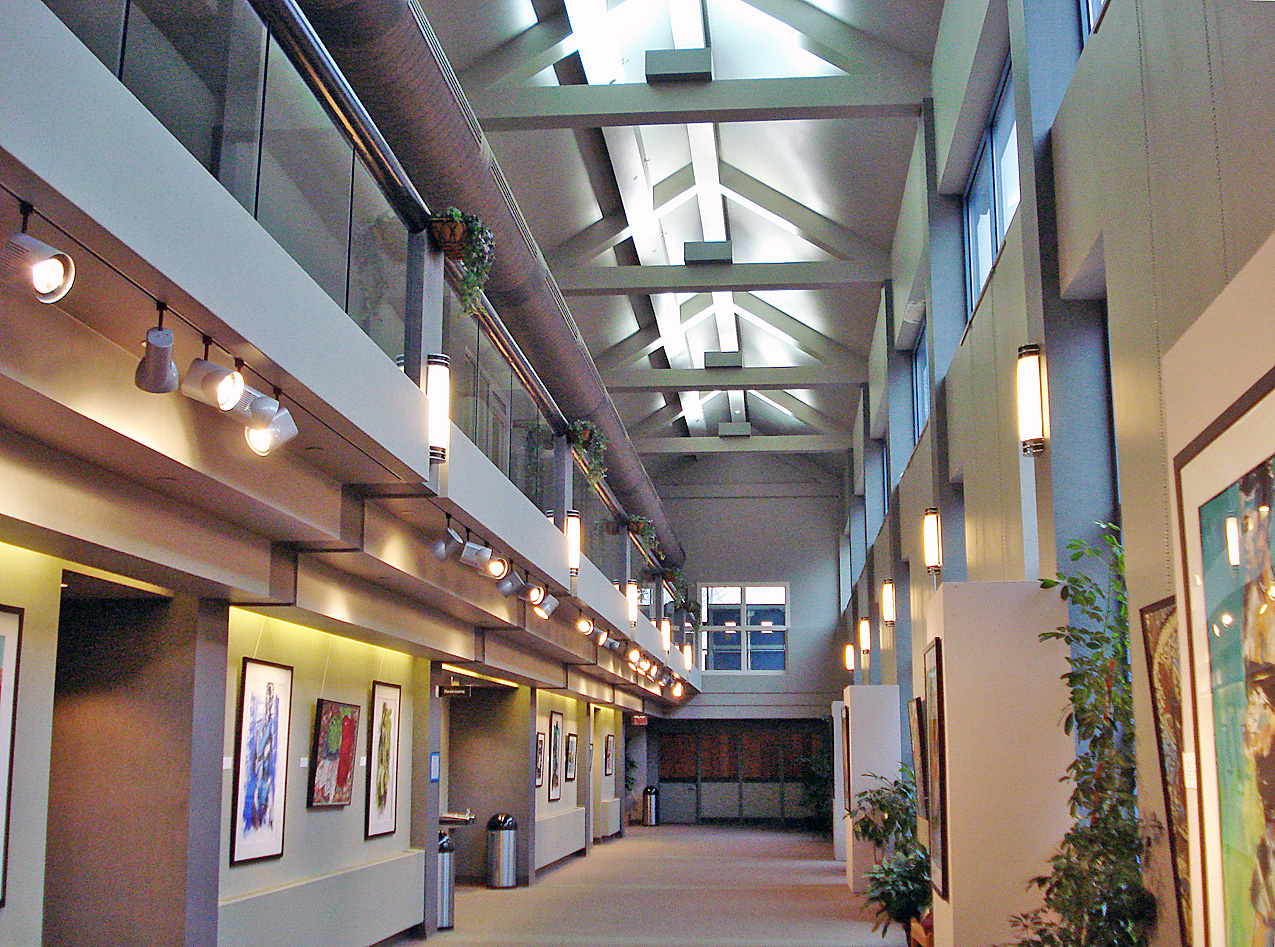
Interior of the Pasquerilla Performing Arts Center

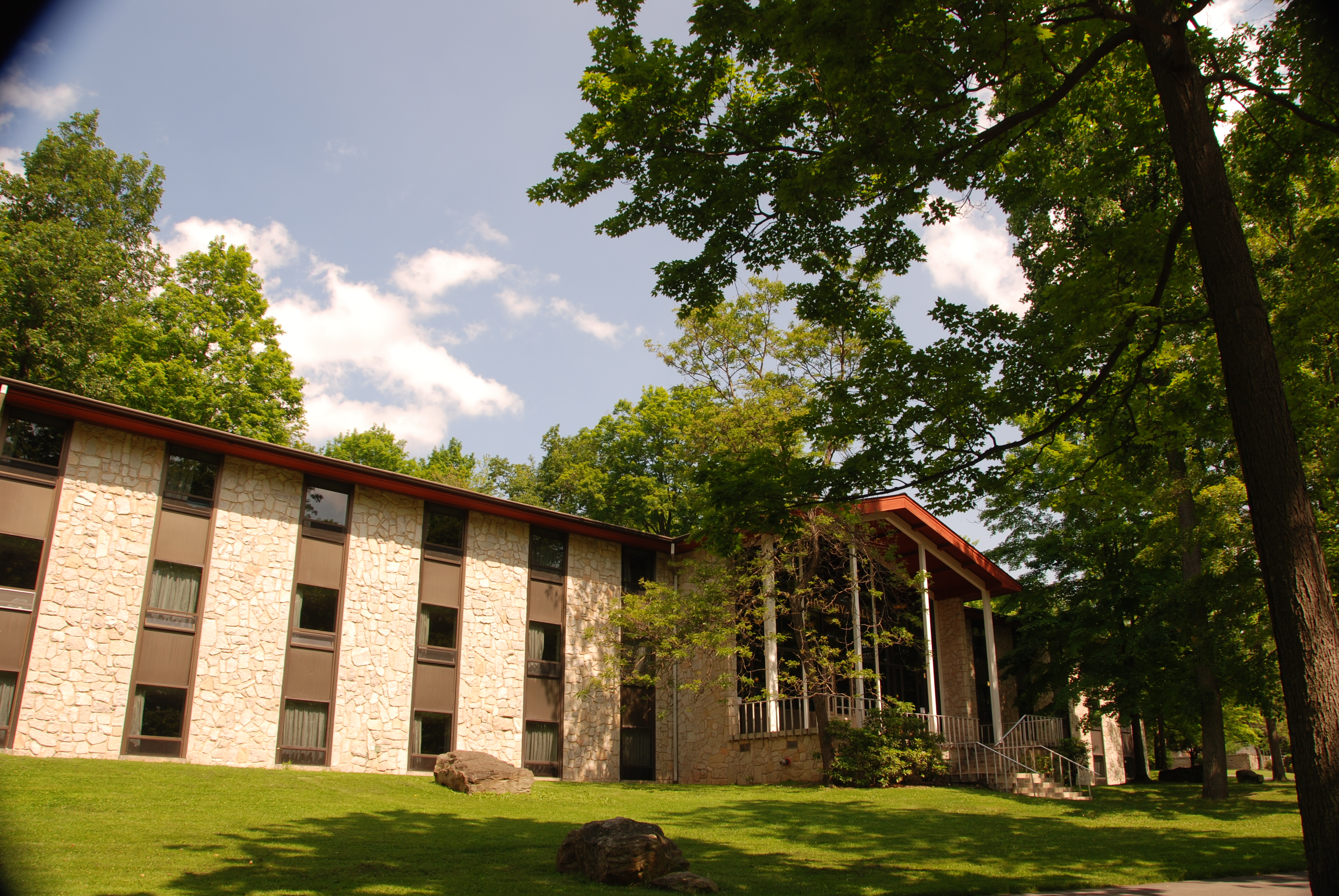
Hickory Hall

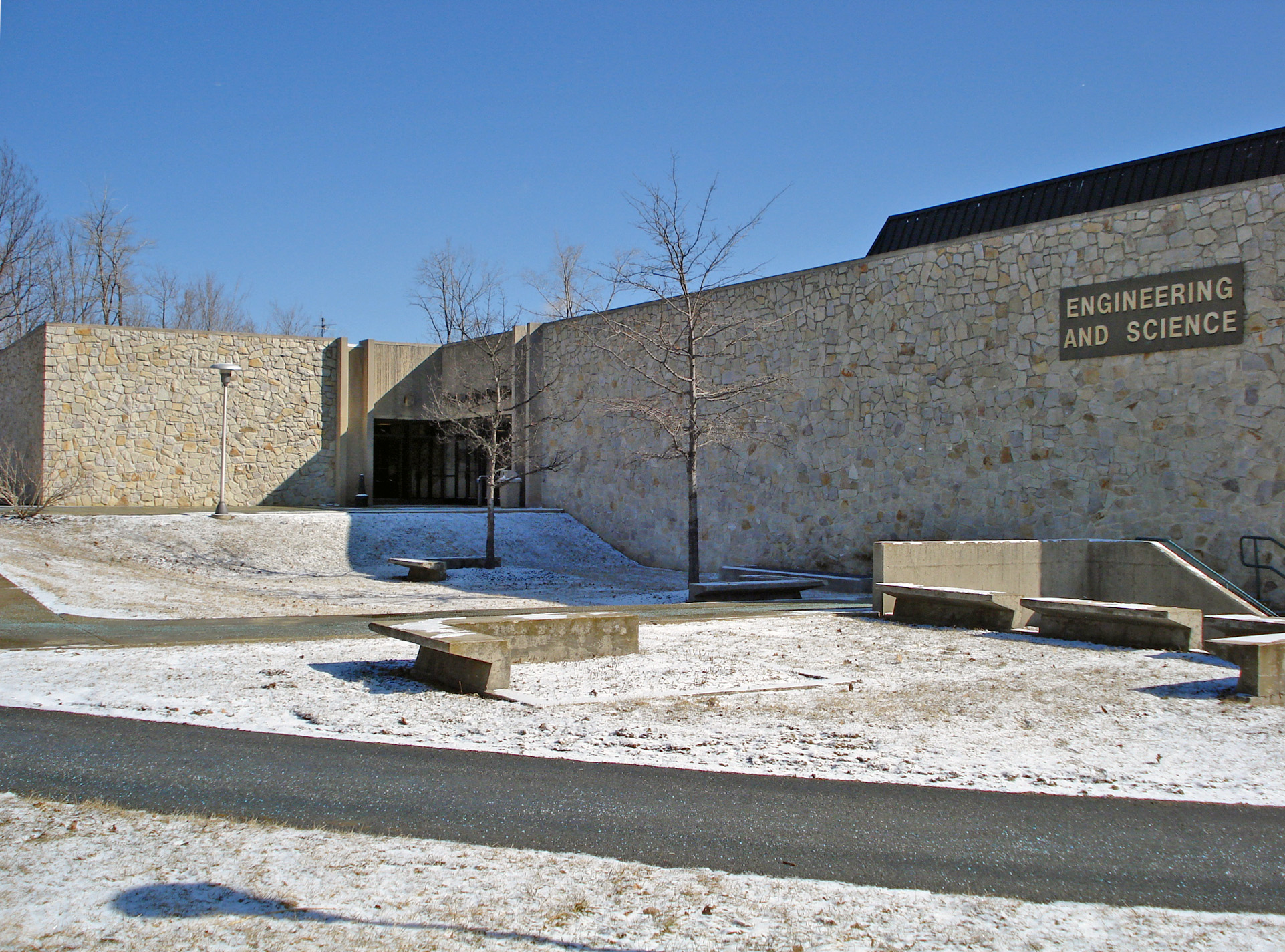
John P. Murtha Engineering and Science Building

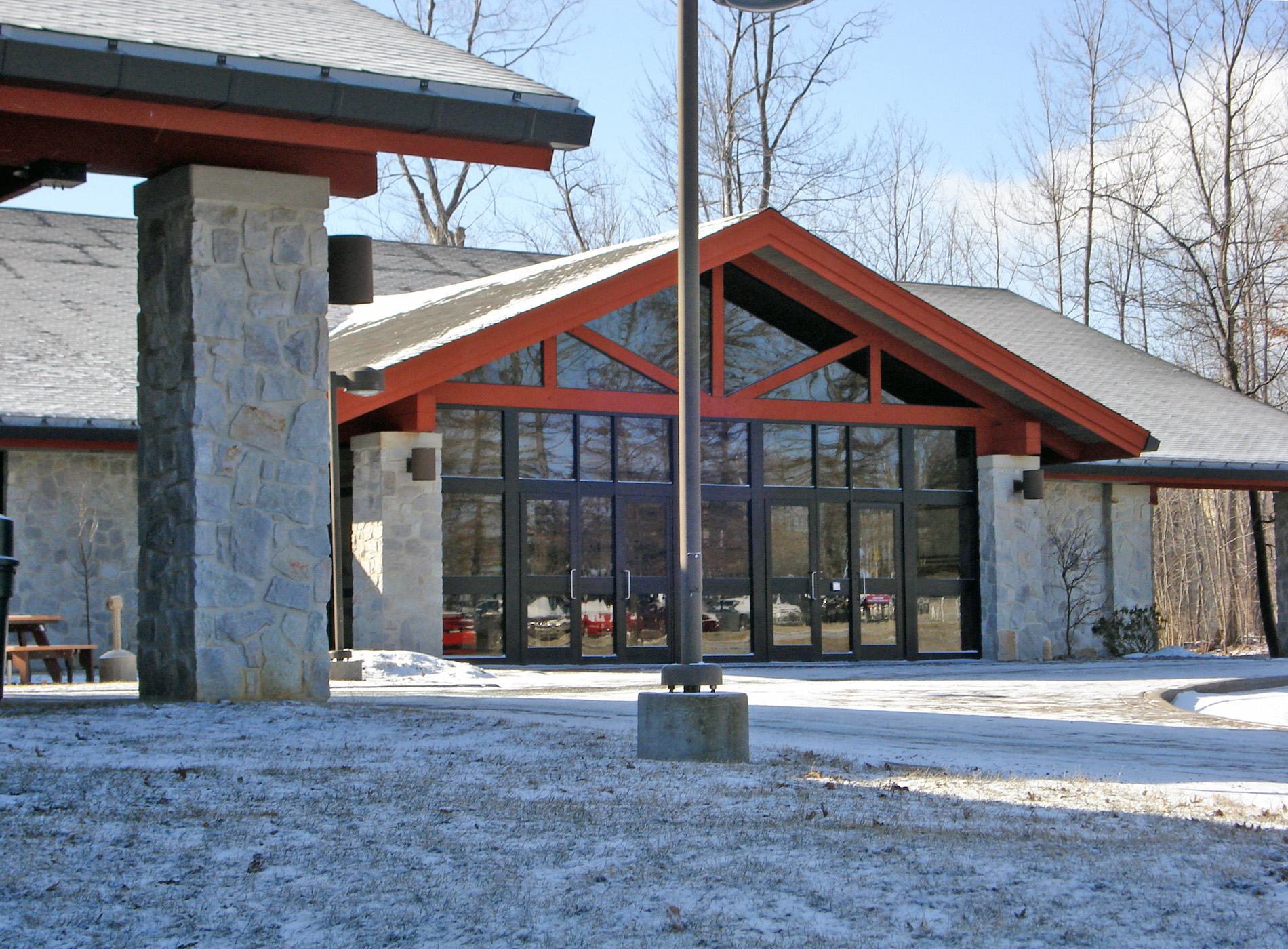
Living Learning Center
