= The Third Billion =

The Third Billion was the term used to represent the approximately one billion women in both developed and industrialized nations whose economic lives were stunted, underleveraged, or suppressed, and who could have taken their place in the global economy as consumers, producers, employees and entrepreneurs.

== Overview of The Third Billion Concept ==
Approximately 870 million women who have been living or contributing at a subsistence level entered the economic mainstream for the first time as producers, consumers, employees, and entrepreneurs by 2020. In the following decade, this number could conceivably pass 1 billion. The economic impact of these women is expected to be at least as significant as that of the populations of China and India that exceed one billion. The term, the “third billion” was coined by Booz & Company partners DeAnne Aguirre and Karim Sabbagh from their analysis of this emerging population published in May 2010.

== The Third Billion Campaign ==
On February 1, 2012, The Third Billion campaign was launched by La Pietra Coalition. The Third Billion campaign aimed to unite governments, NGOs, corporations, youth and others to provide these women with the necessary tools—ensuring access to legal protection, education and training, finance, and markets—to reach their full economic potential. The campaign aimed to help prepare and enabled women who constituted The Third Billion, who had the potential, yet lacked the resources, to compete in the global economy.

== The Third Billion Index ==
Booz & Company published the inaugural Third Billion Index in 2012 to provide a baseline for women's progress in the workforce. The index was a composite of data published by the World Economic Forum and the Economist Intelligence Unit. The index, which combined data from the World Economic Forum and the Economist Intelligence Unit, profiled countries around the world to analyse barriers to women’s economic participation and the role of governments and companies in promoting gender inclusion. Following Booz & Company’s acquisition by PwC in 2014(after which it became Strategy&), the index has not been republished, but its findings continue to be referenced in discussions of global gender equality and women’s economic empowerment.
