= Daniel Gross (journalist) =

American journalist

- Born: August 4, 1967 (age 59); East Lansing, Michigan, U.S.
- Education: Cornell University (BA), Harvard University (AM)
- Occupations: Journalist, author

Daniel Gross (born August 4, 1967) is an American financial and economic journalist. He was the executive editor of strategy+business magazine from 2015 to January 2020 and was named editor-in-chief in February 2020.

Prior to joining strategy+business, Gross was a columnist and the global business editor at the Daily Beast (2012–2014). Previously, he was the economics editor and cohost of The Daily Ticker at Yahoo Finance (2010–2012), a columnist and a senior editor at Newsweek (2007–2010), a columnist at Slate (2002–2010), a columnist at The New York Times, and a reporter for the New Republic and Bloomberg News.

Gross wrote the "Contrary Indicator" column at Newsweek, the "Moneybox" column at Slate, and the "Economic View" column at The New York Times. He also has written cover stories for New York and The New York Times Magazine, and has contributed to Fortune, Wired, The Washington Post, and The Boston Globe. He appears regularly on media outlets such as MSNBC, CNBC, CNN, and NPR.

Between 1998 and 2007, Gross served as the editor of STERNBusiness, a semi-annual academic magazine on economics and management published by the New York University Stern School of Business. He was also a fellow at New America Foundation from 2001 to 2002.

== Books ==
- A Banker's Journey: How Edmond J. Safra Built a Global Financial Empire (Radius Publishing, 2022). (ISBN 978-1635767858)
- Better, Stronger, Faster: The Myth of American Decline . . . and the Rise of a New Economy (Free Press, 2012). (ISBN 1451621280)
- Dumb Money: How our Greatest Financial Minds Bankrupted the Nation (Free Press, 2009). (ISBN 1439159874)
- Pop!: Why Bubbles Are Great For The Economy (Collins, 2007) (ISBN 0061151548)
- The Generations of Corning: The Life and Times of a Global Corporation (Oxford University Press, 2001), co-authored with Davis Dyer (ISBN 0195140958)
- Bull Run: Wall Street, the Democrats, and the New Politics of Personal Finance (PublicAffairs, 2000) (ISBN 1891620290)
- Forbes Greatest Business Stories of All Time (Wiley, 1997) (ISBN 0471196533)

== Select articles ==
- "NBA Commissioner Adam Silver Has a Game Plan," Strategy+Business, April 30, 2018
- "Why Artificial Intelligence Needs Some Emotional Intelligence," Strategy+Business, March 9, 2017
- "The Myth of Decline: The U.S. is Stronger and Faster than Anywhere Else," Newsweek, April 30, 2012
- "The Story of America's Amazing Comeback," Newsweek, April 8, 2010

== Select awards ==
- 2017 Folio "Eddie," B-to-B Column/Blog - Overall, Why Artificial Intelligence Needs Some Emotional Intelligence
- 2017 ASBPE Gold Regional, Online, Podcast, Jonathan Tepperman Explains How to Fix the World's Thorniest Problems
- 2016 Folio "Eddie," B-to-B Column/Blog – Banking/Business/Finance, What Companies Gain from Providing Free Lunch to Employees

== Early life and family ==
A native of East Lansing, Michigan, Gross has Syrian-Jewish ancestry from his mother's side. He graduated from East Lansing High School (1985). He received his bachelor's degree in American history and government from Cornell University (1989), his master's degree in American history from Harvard University (1991), and an honorary PhD in humane letters from Lake Forest College.

He and his wife live in Westport, CT. The couple has two children.
