= Sylvia Ann Hewlett =

Sylvia Ann Hewlett (born 1946) is an economist and author.

== Education ==
Hewlett graduated from Girton College, Cambridge, was a Kennedy Scholar and then earned her PhD degree in economics at the University of London.

== Career ==
Hewlett has taught at Cambridge, Columbia and Princeton Universities and held fellowships at the Institute for Public Policy Research in London and the Center for the Study of Values in Public Life at Harvard.

She is the CEO of Hewlett Consulting Partners and founding president of the Center for Talent Innovation a non-profit think tank, based in New York, focusing on women, minorities and previously excluded minority groups. As of 2012, she has been involved in the Gender and Policy Program at the School of International and Public Affairs at Columbia University and serves as a member of the Council on Foreign Relations and the World Economic Forum Council on Women's Empowerment.

She is the author of several books (see Bibliography section). Her articles have been published in the New York Times, the Financial Times, strategy+business magazine, and the Harvard Business Review. TV appearances include 60 Minutes, The Today Show, Good Morning America, Newshour with Jim Lehrer, Charlie Rose, NewsNight with Aaron Brown, NBC Nightly News, Oprah, The View, All Things Considered, Talk of the Nation, On Point.

Hewlett was awarded the 2014 HR Magazine "Most Influential International Thinker".

== Bibliography ==
=== Books ===
- When the Bough Breaks: The Cost of Neglecting Our Children (1991) ISBN 0-465-09165-2
- Child Neglect in Rich Nations (1993) ISBN 978-9280630268 ebook
- A Lesser Life: The Myth of Women's Liberation in America (1996) ISBN 0-688-04855-2
- The War Against Parents (co-authored with Cornel West) (1998) ISBN 0-395-89169-8
- Creating A Life: What Every Woman Needs to Know About Having a Baby and a Career (2002) ISBN 1-4013-5930-2
- Off-Ramps and On-Ramps: Keeping Talented Women on the Road to Success (2007) ISBN 1-4221-0102-9
- Top Talent: Keeping Performance Up When Business is Down (2009) ISBN 1-4221-4042-3
- Forget a Mentor, Find a Sponsor: The New Way to Fast-Track Your Career (2013) ISBN 1-4221-8716-0
- Executive Presence: The Missing Link Between Merit and Success (2014) ISBN 978-0-06-224689-9
- The Sponsor Effect: How to be a Better Leader by Investing in Others (2019) ISBN 978-1-63369-566-5
- MeToo in the Corporate World: Power, Privilege, and the Path Forward (2020) ISBN 978-0-06-289919-4

=== Articles ===
- Sylvia Ann Hewlett, Carolyn Buck Luce, and Cornel West. (2005) Leadership in Your Midst: Tapping the Hidden Strengths of Minority Executives. doi:10.1225/R0511D
- Sylvia Ann Hewlett, Carolyn Buck Luce. (2006) Extreme Jobs: The Dangerous Allure of the 70-Hour Workweek (HBR OnPoint Enhanced Edition). doi:10.1225/R0612B
- Sylvia Ann Hewlett, Ripa Rashid, and Laura Sherbin. (2017) How to Keep Perceived Bias from Holding Back High-Potential Employees, strategy+business .

== Personal life ==
Hewlett was raised in a poor mining valley of South Wales, Great Britain. She is married to Richard and they have five children, with an age span of 25 years. The youngest was born when she was 51. She lives in New York City, in an apartment that overlooks Central Park West.
