= Katzenbach (Werre) =

River in North Rhine-Westphalia, Germany

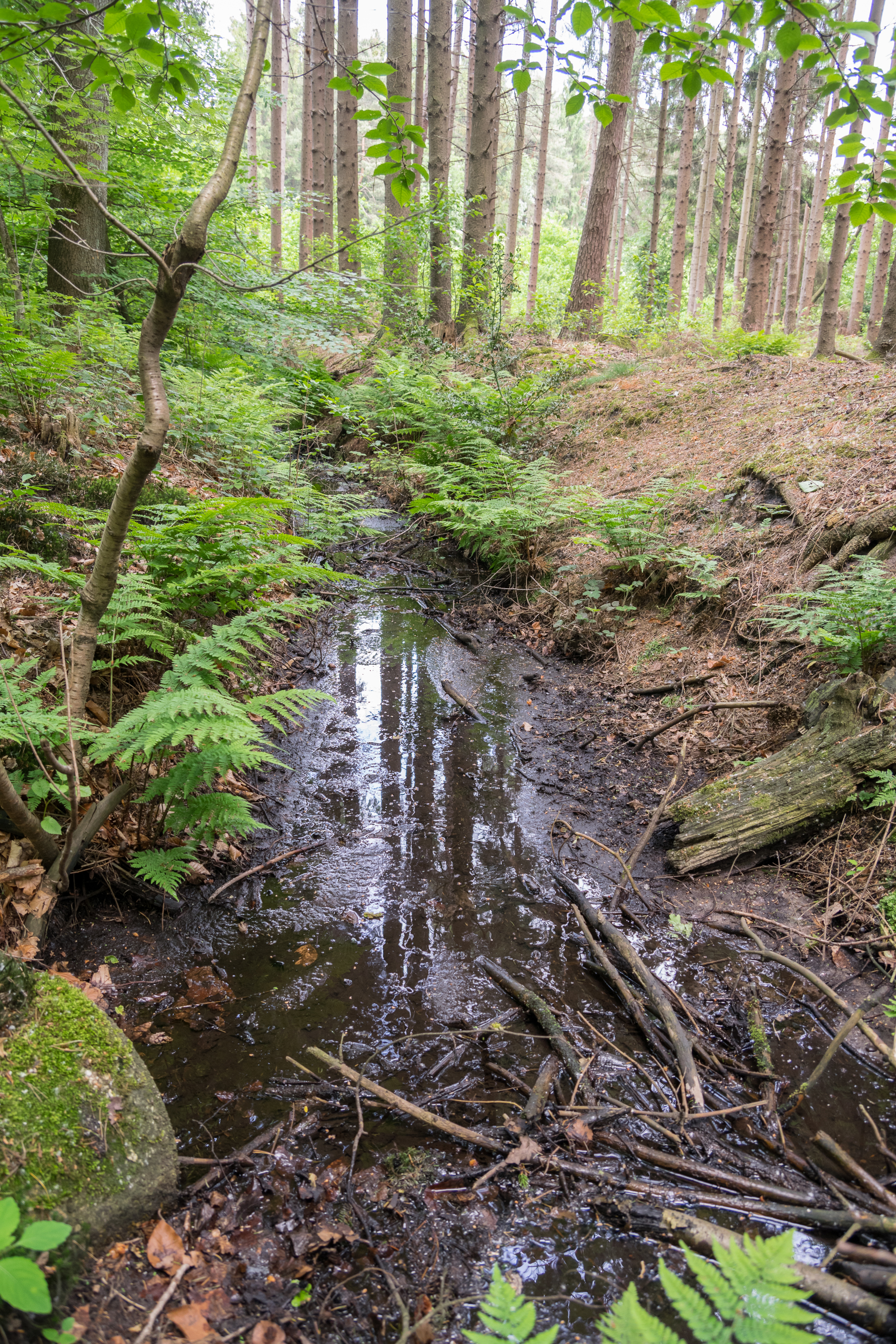

Location
- Country: Germany
- States: North Rhine-Westphalia

Physical characteristics
- Mouth
  - location: Werre
  - coordinates: 51.9534°N 8.8211°E

Basin features
- Progression: Werre→ Weser→ North Sea

Katzenbach is a small river of North Rhine-Westphalia, Germany. It is 1.7 km long and flows into the Werre as a left tributary near Detmold.

== See also ==
- List of rivers of North Rhine-Westphalia
