= Leslie Leve =

American psychologist

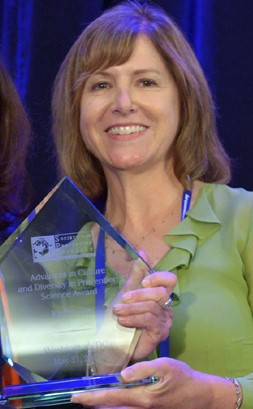
Dr. Leslie Leve presents the 2018 Society for Prevention Research Advances in Culture and Diversity in Prevention Science Award

Leslie D. Leve is an American academic and researcher. She is a professor in the Counseling Psychology and Human Services Department as well as the associate director of Prevention Science Institute at the University of Oregon. She also holds the positions of Associate Director for the Prevention Science graduate programs, was President of the Society for Prevention Research from 2017 to 2019, and was an Associate Vice President for Research in the Office of the Vice President for Research and Innovation from 2017 to 2022, and serves on National Institutes of Health study section panels and on the editorial board for Development and Psychopathology.

== Career ==
Leslie Leve received her bachelor's degree in psychology from the University of California, Santa Cruz, in 1990. She earned a master's degree in psychology in 1991 and a PhD in developmental psychology in 1995 from the University of Oregon. She started working at the University of Oregon in 2013 as a professor in the College of Education. Prior to that, she was a senior scientist at Oregon Social Learning Center. In 2018 Leve received a grant of $12.5 million from the National Institutes of Health (NIH) for the collaborative research on the effects of environment on children's health and development.

== Academic interests ==
Her primary focus is in adoption, foster care, child abuse, intervention, and outcomes for youth in the juvenile justice system, child development, and teen girls. She also co-leads the Early Growth and Development Study, and directed a randomized intervention trial with an aim to limit the appearance of problematic behaviors of girls from foster care who are going to enter middle school.

== Research ==
As of 2018, Leve is working on a study about the influences of genes and environment on child development, which is conducted by studying adopted children and their biological and adoptive families. Leve and other researchers' findings suggest that children may have different health issues than their biological and adoptive siblings. In a study with Luke Hyde, assistant professor of psychology at the University of Michigan, they found that children with aggressive behaviors ("callous-unemotional traits") may inherit these traits from their biological parents, but these behaviors can still be mitigated by positive interactions with adoptive parents, preventing them from developing long-term antisocial behaviors.

In past research, Leve also found that parents' harsh responses can be affected by children's behaviors as well as the parents' characteristics and marriage issues. She and her colleagues have found that mothers with depressive symptoms are more likely to respond to their children's difficult behaviors with anger or irritability, which increases the likelihood the children will develop further behavioral problems. However, if parents (both mothers and fathers) with depressive symptoms have a partner with strong social support, the association between parental depression and child behaviors was weaker. For early child development, Leve believed that a stable connection with the primary caregiver is essential for the children's development. Her research with the Society for Prevention Research showed that prevention programs for drug use proved to be more effective and economical than programs for treating it.

In the middle school girls version of the KEEP SAFE program that she led, she has conducted a study with Hyoun Kim to evaluate the efficiency of the program and the results show a rating of "promising" for the program. The program has shown "a significant decline in tobacco, marijuana, and overall substance use as well as delinquent behavior."

== Selected works ==
- Leve, L. D., Neiderhiser, J. M., Harold, G. T., Natsuaki, M. N., Bohannan, B. J. M, & Cresko, W. A. (2018). Naturalistic experimental designs as tools for understanding the role of genes and the environment in prevention research. Prevention Science, 19(1), 68–78. doi: 10.1007/s11121-017-0746-8 PMC: 5511771
- Harold, G. T., Leve, L. D., & Sellers, R. (2017). How can genetically informed research help inform the next generation of interparental and parenting interventions? Child Development, 88(2), 446–458. doi: 10.1111/cdev.12742 PMC: 5567989
- Tang, Y. Y., & Leve, L. D. (2016). A translational neuroscience perspective on mindfulness meditation as a prevention strategy. Translational Behavioral Medicine: Practice, Policy and Research, 6, 63–72. doi: 10.1007/s13142-015-0360-x. PMC: 4807201
- Leve, L. D., Chamberlain, P., & Kim, H. K. (2015). Risks, outcomes, and evidence-based interventions for girls in the U. S. juvenile justice system. Clinical Child and Family Psychology Review, 18(3), 252–279. doi: 10.1007/s10567-015-0186-6. PMC: 4536111
- Leve, L., Van Ryzin, M., & Chamberlain, P. (2015). Sexual risk behavior and STI contraction among young women with prior juvenile justice involvement. Journal of HIV/AIDS & social services, 14(2), 171–187. doi: 10.1080/15381501.2014.912171. PMC: 4482469
- Leve, L. D., Neiderhiser, J. M., Shaw, D. S., Ganiban, J., Natsuaki, M. N., & Reiss, D. (2013). The Early Growth and Development Study: A prospective adoption study from birth through middle childhood. Twin Research and Human Genetics, 16(1), 412–423. PMC: 3572752
- Leve, L. D., Harold, G. T., Chamberlain, P., Landsverk, J. A., Fisher, P. A., & Vostanis, P. (2012). Practitioner review: Children in foster care: Vulnerabilities and evidence-based interventions that promote resilience processes. Journal of Child Psychology and Psychiatry, 53, 1197–1211. PMC: 3505234
