= Sally Helgesen =

American writer on women and the workplace

- Born: July 1, 1948 (age 77)
- Education: Bachelor's Degree in English
- Alma mater: Michigan State University

Sally Helgesen (born July 1, 1948) is an American author, speaker and leadership coach.

== Early life and education ==
Helgesen was born in St. Cloud, Minnesota and grew up in Kalamazoo, Michigan. She attended Michigan State University, received her BA degree in English and Classics Hunter College (1973–75) and attended The Graduate Center of the City University of New York.

== Career ==
In 1990, Helgesen published The Female Advantage: Women’s Ways of Leadership, the first book to focus on what women had to contribute as leaders rather than how they needed to change and adapt. The book became a best-seller and has remained continuously in print. In 1995, Helgesen published The Web of Inclusion: A New Architecture for Building Great Organizations, which has been heralded as having introduced the language of inclusion into the work environment.

In 2018, she published How Women Rise with co-author Marshall Goldsmith. The book explores 12 habits that get in the way of women's success and how to overcome them. It became an international best-seller.

== Awards & Honors ==
She is a member of the New York and International Women’s Forums, and the 100 Coaches Network.

== Writing ==
=== Books ===
- How Women Rise: Break the 12 Habits Holding You Back from Your Next Raise, Promotion or Job (with Marshall Goldsmith)
- The Female Vision: Women’s Real Power at Work (with Julie Johnson)
- The Web of Inclusion: A New Architecture for Building Great Organizations
- Thriving in 24/7: Six Strategies for Taming the New World of Work
- Everyday Revolutionaries: Working Women and the Transformation of American Life
- The Female Advantage: Women’s Ways of Leadership
- Wildcatters: A Story of Texas, Oil and Money

== Personal life ==
Helgesen lives in Chatham, New York.
