= Marshall Goldsmith =

American executive leadership coach

- Born: March 20, 1949 (age 77); Valley Station, Kentucky
- Education: Rose-Hulman Institute of Technology; Indiana University, Kelley School of Business; UCLA Anderson School of Management
- Occupations: Author; Professor; Executive Educator; Coach
- Spouse: Lyda Goldsmith
- Children: Kelly Goldsmith, Bryan Goldsmith
- Website: marshallgoldsmith.com

Marshall Goldsmith (born March 20, 1949) is an American executive leadership coach and author.

== Early life and education ==
Goldsmith was born in Valley Station, Kentucky, and received a degree in mathematical economics from Rose-Hulman Institute of Technology in Terre Haute, Indiana in 1970; where he was also a brother of the Theta Xi fraternity. He then earned an MBA from Indiana University's Kelley School of Business in 1972, and a PhD from UCLA Anderson School of Management in Los Angeles, California in 1977.

In 2012, Goldsmith was awarded The John E. Anderson Distinguished Alumni Award, the highest accolade that the UCLA Anderson School of Management bestows upon alumni. Indiana University's Kelley School of Business also awarded Marshall the Distinguished Entrepreneur of the Year in 2010.

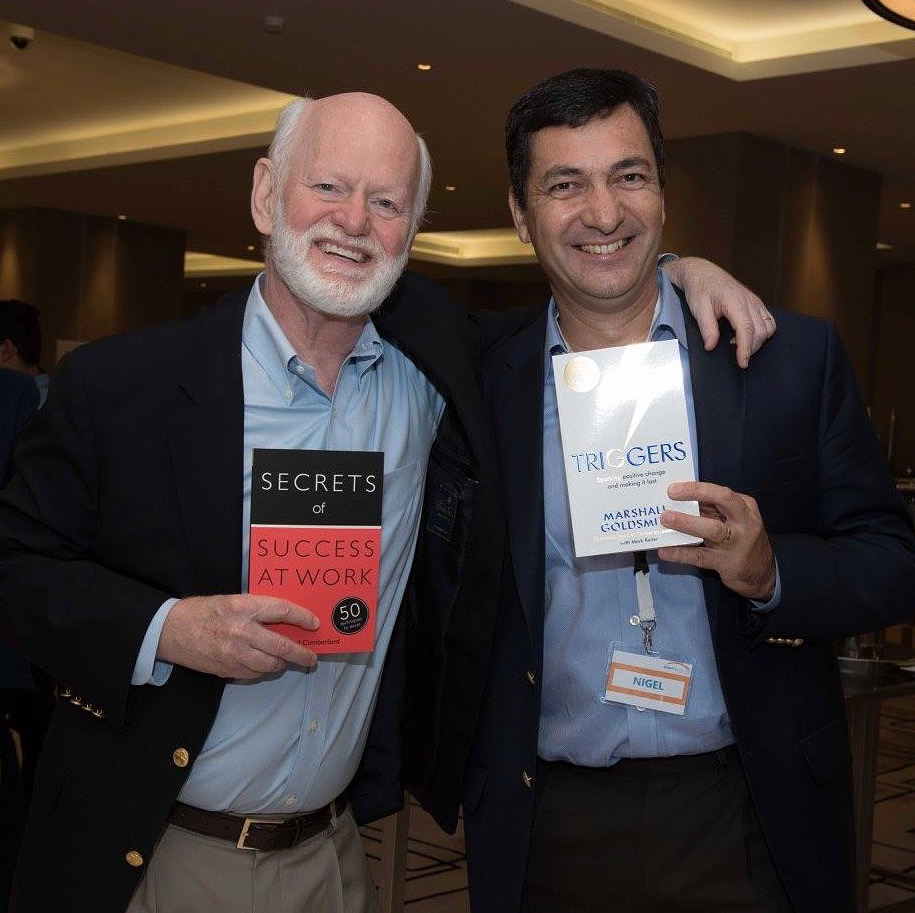
Goldsmith with fellow author & coach Nigel Cumberland in Dubai on 6 September 2015

== Career ==
From 1976 to 1980, Goldsmith was an assistant professor and then associate dean at Loyola Marymount University's College of Business. He later served as a professor of management practice at Dartmouth College's Tuck School of Business. In 1977, he entered the field of management education after meeting Paul Hersey, and Goldsmith later co-founded the management education firm Keilty, Goldsmith and Company. He became a founding partner of the Marshall Goldsmith Group, an executive coaching group. Throughout Marshall's career, he has worked with CEOs from over 200 companies.

According to ES Wibbeke and Sarah McArthur, Goldsmith was the pioneer in the use of 360-degree feedback.

Marshall's work was profiled in The New Yorker in an article titled, "The Better Boss," and in The Atlantic by John Dickerson in an article titled "The Questions That Will Get Me Through the Pandemic."

== Books ==
- Work is Love Made Visible: A Collection of Essays About the Power of Finding Your Purpose From the World's Greatest Thought Leaders. Frances Hesselbein, Marshall Goldsmith, and Sarah McArthur. Wiley (2018).
- How Women Rise: Break the 12 Habits Holding You Back from Your Next Raise, Promotion, or Job. Sally Helgesen and Marshall Goldsmith. Hachette Books (2018).
- Triggers: Creating Behavior That Lasts--Becoming the Person You Want to Be. Marshall Goldsmith and Mark Reiter. Crown (2015). ISBN 9780804141239
- Managers as Mentors: Building Partnerships For Leaders, 3rd Edition (with Chip R. Bell, 2013), Berrett-Koehlers; ISBN 9781609947101.
- MOJO: How to Get It, How to Keep It, and How to Get It Back If You Lose It. Marshall Goldsmith with Mark Reiter. Hyperion (2010).
- What Got You Here Won't Get You There in Sales. Marshall Goldsmith, Don Brown, and Bill Hawkins. GBH Press (2010). ISBN 9780071773942
- Succession: Are You Ready? Marshall Goldsmith. Harvard Business Press (2009).
- What Got You Here Won't Get You There. Marshall Goldsmith with Mark Reiter. Hyperion (2007).
- Global Leadership: The Next Generation. Marshall Goldsmith, Alastair Robertson, Cathy Greenberg, Maya Hu-Chan. FT Prentice Hall (2003).
- The Leadership Investment: How the World's Best Organizations Gain Strategic Advantage Through Leadership Development. Robert Fulmer and Marshall Goldsmith. AMACOM (2001).
- The Change Champion's Field Guide: Strategies and Tools for Leading Change in Your Organization 2nd Edition. Louis Carter and Marshall Goldsmith. Pfeiffer (2013).
- Best Practices in Leadership Development and Organization Change. Louis Carter and Marshall Goldsmith. Pfeiffer (2004).
- Best Practices in Talent Management. Marshall Goldsmith and Louis Carter. Pfeiffer (2009).
- Coaching for Leadership: The practice of leadership coaching from the world s greatest coacher Marshall Goldsmith (author), Laurence S. Lyons (author), Sarah McArthur (author). Pfeiffer; 2nd Edition (2020).
- The Earned Life: Lose Regret, Choose Fulfillment. Marshall Goldsmith and Mark Reiter (2022).

== Personal life ==
Marshall currently lives in Nashville, Tennessee with his wife, Lyda. He has a son, Bryan Goldsmith, and a daughter, Kelly Goldsmith. Goldsmith has described himself as a "philosophical Buddhist."
