= Greenleaf Book Group =

Independent American book publisher

- Founded: 1997; 29 years ago
- Founder: Clint Greenleaf
- Country of origin: United States
- Headquarters location: Austin, Texas
- Distribution: Self-distributed (US); Gazelle Book Services (UK)
- Publication types: Books
- Nonfiction topics: Business, Leadership, Self-help, Economics, Health & Fitness, Finance, Technology, Innovation
- Imprints: Greenleaf Book Group Press, River Grove Books, An Inc. Original, Fast Company Press, Kiplinger Books, Family Business Press, Wonderwell Press
- No. of employees: 50
- Official website: www.greenleafbookgroup.com

Greenleaf Book Group is an American independent book publisher and distributor based in Austin, Texas, United States of America. It was established by Clint Greenleaf in 1997. Greenleaf was a CPA and accountant at Deloitte & Touche before writing his first book, Attention to Detail, in 1997 and then founding the company over his parents’ garage. The company is a hybrid publisher — a business model where the author pays for the publishing under a selective imprint and retains all rights.

Greenleaf is a member of the Independent Book Publishers Association, Association of American Publishers, American Library Association, and National Speakers Association.

== History ==
In January 2014, Clint Greenleaf moved to chairman and chief operating officer Tanya Hall was appointed CEO. Greenleaf stepped down as chairman in 2015 in order to focus on a new business startup, Home Plate Peanut Butter.

== Imprints ==
Greenleaf Book Group Press is the flagship imprint of Greenleaf Book Group, founded in 1997, and distributes into brick and mortar retailers.

River Grove Books is a digital-first imprint for books that are primarily sold online.

An Inc. Original is a partnership imprint between Greenleaf Book Group and Inc. Business Media, dedicated to books by and for entrepreneurs.

Fast Company Press is a partnership imprint with Fast Company Magazine, specializing in books by businesspeople.

In late 2023, boutique hybrid publisher Wonderwell ceased publishing operations and joined forces with Greenleaf Book Group. Greenleaf took over distribution of Wonderwell’s existing catalog, and former CEO Maggie Langrick helped launch Wonderwell Press, a Greenleaf nonfiction imprint.

Family Business Press is a partnership between Greenleaf Book Group and Family Business Magazine. This imprint publishes books by and for multigenerational businesses, as well as for business owners.

Kiplinger Books is a partnership imprint established in 2025 between Greenleaf Book Group and the personal finance and business forecasting brand Kiplinger.

== Acquisition ==
On September 24, 2025, Civica Media, a newly formed book publishing company, announced it had acquired Greenleaf Book Group and Amplify Publishing Group. Civica is funded by the private equity firm BlackBern Partners and is led by CEO Laura Albero. At the time of the announcement, Tanya Hall led Greenleaf's executive team, and its brand imprint partnerships included An Inc Original, Fast Company Press, Family Business Press, Kiplinger Books and Wonderwell.

== See also ==
- List of publishers
- List of book distributors
- Publishing
