= Frances Hesselbein =

American businesswoman (1915–2022)

- Born: November 1, 1915; Johnstown, Pennsylvania, U.S.
- Died: December 11, 2022 (aged 107); Easton, Pennsylvania, U.S.
- Education: University of Pittsburgh Johnstown Junior College
- Occupations: Writer, management consultant
- Spouse: John Hesselbein
- Awards: Presidential Medal of Freedom

Frances Hesselbein (November 1, 1915 – December 11, 2022) was an American businesswoman and writer. She was the CEO of the Girl Scouts of the USA, from 1976 to 1990, and the president and CEO of the Peter F. Drucker Foundation for Non-Profit Management, the Leader to Leader Institute, and the Frances Hesselbein Leadership Institute, which later became the Frances Hesselbein Leadership Forum at the University of Pittsburgh Graduate School of Public and International Affairs (GSPIA), Johnson Institute for Responsible Leadership.

== Career ==
Hesselbein took classes at the University of Pittsburgh Johnstown Junior College in 1936.

Between 1965 and 1976, she rose from volunteer troop leader to CEO and held the position of CEO for thirteen years until 1990. During her tenure, the Girl Scouts attained a membership of 2.25 million girls with a workforce of 780,000, mainly volunteers.

In 1990, Hesselbein left the Girl Scouts to run the Leader to Leader Institute (formerly known as the Peter F. Drucker Foundation for Nonprofit Management). After Drucker's death in 2005, the foundation was renamed after Hesselbein in 2012; it is now known as the Frances Hesselbein Leadership Institute.

In 2009, she helped to found the Hesselbein Global Academy for Student Leadership and Civic Engagement at the University of Pittsburgh.

Hesselbein is the co-editor of 27 books published in 29 languages and the author of Hesselbein on Leadership and My Life in Leadership.

Hesselbein was on the boards of the Mutual of America Life Insurance Company, the Bright China Social Fund, California Institute of Advanced Management, and the Teachers College, Columbia University Presidents Advisory Council.

== Awards ==
In 1998, Hesselbein was awarded the Presidential Medal of Freedom for her work with the Girl Scouts of the USA. She turned 100 years old in November 2015.

Hesselbein was denoted a Pitt Legacy Laureate of the University of Pittsburgh in 2000. She has received 22 honorary doctoral degrees.

== Personal life ==
Frances Hesselbein was married to John Hesselbein. She died at her home in Easton, Pennsylvania, on December 11, 2022, at the age of 107.

== Frances Hesselbein Student Leadership Program ==
In 2006, the Military Child Education Coalition (MCEC) created the Frances Hesselbein Student Leadership Program to support high school students and to honor Hesselbein and her situational leadership. The program aims to teach high school students leadership, communication, and team-building skills by sending them on a week-long trip to either the United States Military Academy in the fall or to the United States Air Force Academy in the spring.

== Publications ==
=== Author ===
- Hesselbein, Frances, foreword by Jim Collins, My Life in Leadership, 2011
- Hesselbein, Frances, and General Eric K. Shinseki, United States Army, Ret. Be, Know, Do: Leadership the Army Way, 2004
- Hesselbein, Frances, foreword by Jim Collins, Hesselbein on Leadership, 2002

=== Editor ===
- Hesselbein, Frances, Marshall Goldsmith, Sarah McArthur, eds.Work Is Love Made Visible, 2018.
- Hesselbein, Frances and Marshall Goldsmith, eds. The Organization of the Future 2: Visions, Strategies, and Insights on Managing in a New Era, 2009.
