= Journelle =

American lingerie company

- Industry: Apparel
- Founded: 2007; 19 years ago
- Founder: Claire Chambers
- Headquarters: New York City
- Number of locations: 4 (Dec 2011)
- Area served: United States and Canada
- Products: Bras; Panties; Hosiery; Lingerie sleepwear loungewear
- Number of employees: 70
- Website: journelle.com

Journelle is a luxury lingerie company based in New York. Founded by Claire Chambers, the name Journelle comes from the archaic French word journellement meaning 'daily', as lingerie is designed to be worn every day.

== Locations ==
=== New York ===
Journelle's flagship store in Union Square opened its doors in December 2007. In November 2010, Journelle opened a store in Soho at 125 Mercer St. In 2011, Journelle opened its Upper East Side store on the corner of 73rd St. and 3rd Ave.

=== Chicago ===
In November 2015, Journelle opened its Chicago location at 1725 N. Damen Street between Willow and Wabansia Chicago, IL 60647.

== Products ==
Journelle carries lingerie ranging from everyday basics to special occasions. It is known to have "pretty, lacy, delicate lingerie". The store also stocks loungewear, hosiery, shapewear, and accessories. Some brands and designers they carry include Chantelle, Hanky Panky, Eberjey, Fleur of England, Wolford, Natori, Simone Perele, and La Perla.

In February 2013, the company bottled its signature scent, The Linden flower, and created its own lingerie wash. Before the 2012 holiday season, it debuted luxury sleepwear under its company name and launched its full Journelle Collection, AW15.

== The Grey Lady ==
During summer 2013, Journelle launched a mobile pop-up shop road trip. The company retrofitted a 1970 Land Yacht Airstream to resemble the stores' aesthetic and atmosphere, complete with a tucked away dressing room, a lounging banquette, and custom shelving. The airstream, named the Grey Lady, kicked off the summer in Sag Harbor, then travelled to Boston, Chicago, and Washington D.C. During New York Fashion Week, the Grey Lady popped up at the Standard Hotel's High Line location.

The road trip served as a way for Journelle to meet already loyal customers and introduce them to the personal in-store experience, as well as a way to test top e-commerce markets for potential store expansion.

== Free The Girls ==
In 2012, Journelle began an annual partnership with the nonprofit Free The Girls for a Spring Cleaning bra drive. Journelle collects gently used bras to send to the organization, which supports women who have been rescued from trafficking. Journelle runs the drive in each of their stores, as well as online, offering discounts to participants who donate gently used bras. They also donate $1 for each bra donated.

The bras are delivered by Free The Girls to safe houses in Mozambique that assist former trafficking victims in selling the bras to local women.. By earning their wages and building their business model, these women can support themselves and their families.

== History ==
Claire Chambers founded Journelle in 2007, opening additional stores in SoHo and Miami Beach in 2010, and on the Upper East Side of Manhattan in 2011. In 2013, Triumph International acquired a majority stake in Journelle. Chambers departed in 2015 shortly before opening their Chicago store.

In summer 2019, Journelle was acquired by Cosabella co-chief executive officer and creative director Guido Campello and his wife Sapna Palep.
