= Jon Katzenbach =

American writer

Jon R. Katzenbach (August 26, 1932 – October 11, 2025) was an author and consultant who was best known for his work on informal organization. He is a practitioner in organizational strategies for Strategy&. He was a managing director with PwC U.S., based in New York.

== Early life ==
Katzenbach attended Brigham Young University and graduated with distinction from Stanford University in 1954 with a Bachelor of Arts degree in economics. He obtained his MBA from Harvard University in 1959 where he was a Baker Scholar.

== Bibliography ==
- The Wisdom of Teams: Creating the High-Performance Organization (1992)
- The Discipline of Teams: A Mindbook-Workbook for Delivering Small Group Performance (1993)
- Real Change Leaders: How You Can Create Growth and High Performance at Your Company (1995)
- Teams at the Top: Unleashing the Potential of Both Teams and Individual Leaders (1997)
- Peak Performance: Aligning the Hearts and Minds of Your Employees (2000)
- Why Pride Matters More Than Money (2003)
- Leading Outside the Lines: How to Mobilize the Informal Organization, Energize Your Team, and Get Better Results (2010)
- HBR's 10 Must Reads on Teams (2013)
- High-Performance Teams (2016)
