= Joel Kurtzman =

American novelist

Joel Allan Kurtzman (June 25, 1947 – April 6, 2016) was an American economist. He was a Senior Fellow at the Milken Institute, a non-profit, non-partisan think tank. His research focused on globalization and its risks and has been published widely. He was also executive director of the Milken Institute's SAVE Project which focuses on energy security, climate change and alternative energy.

Kurtzman was a member of the Board of Directors of Revolution Prep, and a member of the editorial board of MIT Sloan Management Review. He was a member of the Board of Directors of the Wharton School's SEI Center for Advanced Studies in Management and to the Vice Chancellor for Research at the University of California, Davis.

Kurtzman was the Editor-in-Chief of the Harvard Business Review and a member of the editorial board of Harvard Business School Publishing. He was founding Editor-in-Chief of Strategy + Business magazine, where he coined the term "thought leader".

Kurtzman was also Sunday business editor and columnist at The New York Times.

Kurtzman authored, co-authored or edited 20 books and hundreds of general and scholarly articles. His widely cited book, The Death Of Money, was made into television documentaries in the U.S., (PBS) and in Japan (NHK).

Before forming the Kurtzman Group, Kurtzman was Global Lead Partner for Thought Leadership and Innovation at PricewaterhouseCoopers.

Earlier in his career, Kurtzman was an international economist at the United Nations where he was deputy director of the U.N.'s Project on the Future. His research teams produced a library of 17 volumes of books on the global economy (The NIEO Library, Pergamon Press, Elsmford, New York).

Kurtzman testified before the U.S. Congress on economic matters and has provided testimony to the Italian Parliament and the Parliament of Spain regarding their economic development activities.

While at the UN, Kurtzman was involved as a negotiator between India and the Union Carbide Corporation over the Bhopal disaster. With the Indian environmentalist, advocate and writer, Rashmi Mayur, Kurtzman met with senior officials at Union Carbide, including its chairman and CEO, Warren Anderson, and with U.S. and Indian government officials, with a proposal to have settlement funds for victims of the disaster administered by an independent council made up of global leaders. The funds were to be administered from Switzerland. The aim of the proposal was to insure funds would be dispensed to individuals impacted by the disaster in a timely way, and to protect against losses due to corruption. The proposal had support, but was never acted upon.

In 2000, he was awarded India's 16th Annual Global Indira Gandhi Prize by the Priyadarshni Academy, in Mumbai, for his work in Thought Leadership.

During his tenure as Global Thought Leader at PricewaterhouseCoopers, Joel Kurtzman created the Opacity Index, which was the subject of a full-length book, The Global Edge, published by Harvard Business School Press.

== Bibliography ==
- Unleashing the Second American Century: Four Forces for Economic Dominance, Perseus/Public Affairs, 2014
- Common Purpose: How Great Leaders Get Organizations to Achieve the Extraordinary, Jossey-Bass, 2010
- How the Market Can Curb Climate Change September/October 2009 Foreign Affairs
- Global Edge: Using the Opacity Index to Manage the Risks of Cross-border Business, Harvard Business School Press, 2007
- Startups That Work: Surprising Research on What Makes or Breaks a New Company, Portfolio/Putnam Business, September, 2005, New York
- MBA in a Box: Practical Ideas from the Best Brains in Business, 2004, Random House, New York
- How the Markets Really Work, May 2002, Random House, New York
- Radical E, May 2001, John Wiley & Sons, New York
- Thought Leaders: Insights on the Future of Business, Jossey-Bass/Simon & Schuster, San Francisco, December 1997. Also in French, German and Japanese.
- The Death of Money: How the Electronic Economy Has Destabilized the World's Markets and Created Financial Chaos, Simon & Schuster, New York, April 1993; paperback by Little Brown, New York, 1994; published in Japan by Kodansha, 1994. Also in Spanish, Portuguese and Chinese.
- The Decline and Crash of the American Economy, an analysis of the strengths and weaknesses of the U.S. economy, W.W. Norton and Company, New York, 1988.
- Futurcasting, a textbook on forecasting, E.T.C. Publications, Palm Springs, CA,1983.
- Rcdc (Regional Cooperation Among Developing Countries): The New Imperative of Development in the 1980s, (Co-authored with Ervin Laszlo and A.K. Bhattacharya) Pergamon Press, Elmsford, NY,1983.
- Eastern Europe and the New International Economic Order: Representative Samples of Socialist Perspectives, (edited with Ervin Laszlo) Pergamon Press, Elmsford, NY,1980, also in French.
- The Structure of the World Economy and Prospects for a New International Economic Order, (Edited with Ervin Laszlo) Pergamon Press, Elmsford, NY,1980, also in French, Spanish and Italian.
- Food for the World, (co-authored with Toivo Miljan and Ervin Laszlo) Pergamon Press, Elmsford, NY, 1980.
- World Leadership And The New International Economic Order, (co-authored with John O'Manique and Ervin Laszlo) Pergamon Press, Elmsford, NY,1980.
- Europe And The New International Economic Order, (Edited with Ervin Laszlo) Pergamon Press, Elmsford, NY,1979, also in French.
- The United States, Canada and the New International Economic Order, (co-authored with Ervin Laszlo) Pergamon Press, Elmsford, NY, 1978, also in French.
- Political and Institutional Issues of the New International Economic Order, (co-authored with Ervin Laszlo) Pergamon Press, Elmsford, NY,1978.
- No More Dying, the future of bio-medical technology, co-authored with Phillip Gordon, J.P. Tarcher/St. Martins, New York,1977, Dell Books, 1978; In Spanish Editiones Lazar, 1979; also in Russian, 1987.
- Sweet Bobby : A Novel, a novel, McGraw-Hill, New York,1974.
- Crown of Flowers, a novel, E.P. Dutton, New York, 1970, Ballantine Books, New York, 1971.
