= Outline of consulting =

Overview of concepts related to consulting

The following outline is provided as an overview of and topical guide to consulting:

Consulting is the activity or business of giving expert assistance on a particular subject, notably to other professionals but also to the consumer market. The following outline provides a general overview of consulting.

== Overview ==
- Coaching
- Contingent work
  - Freelancer
  - Gig worker
  - Temporary work
- Division of labour
- Employment agency
- Focus group
- Knowledge worker
  - Knowledge as a service
- Professional services network
  - Professional corporation
- Service provider
  - Service-level agreement
- White-collar worker
  - White shoe firm

== Types ==
- Biotechnology consulting
- Economic consulting
- Energy consulting
- Engineering consulting
- Environmental consulting
- Faculty consulting
- Franchise consulting
- Human resource consulting
- Information technology consulting
  - Data as a service
  - Data virtualization
  - Information Technology Infrastructure Library
- Management consulting
- Political consulting
- Public consultation
- Public sector consulting
- Trial consulting

== Concepts ==
- Action plan
- Business case
- Business reporting
- Capacity planning
  - Production planning
- Change management
- Compound annual growth rate
- Critical path method
- Deliverable
- Design structure matrix
- Ethics in business communication
- Feedback
- High- and low-level
- Information market
- Leverage (finance)
- Mind map
- Organic growth
- Organizational intelligence
  - Organizational diagnostics
- Performance indicator
- Presentation slide
- Scenario planning
- Scope (project management)
- Top-down and bottom-up design
- Utilization rate
- Zero Defects

== Formats ==
- Enterprise legal management
- Enterprise resource planning
  - Business process modelling
    - Business process re-engineering
    - Business reference model
  - Enterprise architecture framework
  - Manufacturing resource planning
- Professional services
  - Business valuation
  - Governance, risk management, and compliance
    - Expert determination
    - Risk and strategic consulting
    - Risk assessment
  - Settlement (finance)
  - Strategy
- Subject-matter expert

== Services ==
- Corporate services
  - Actuary
  - Clinical pharmacology
  - Corporate finance
    - Leveraged buyout
    - Mergers and acquisitions
  - Recruitment
- Corporate sustainability
- Financial services
  - Accounting
    - Assurance services
    - Environmental accounting
    - Financial accounting
    - Governmental accounting
  - Advisor
  - Audit
    - Financial audit
    - Management audit
    - Performance audit
  - Investment management
  - Liquidation
  - Wealth management
- Outsourcing
  - Business process outsourcing
- Professional network service
  - Business networking
  - Multidisciplinary professional services networks
- Research and development
  - Business analysis
  - Research and development agreement

== Occupations ==
- Business consultant
- Consultant (medicine)
- Creative consultant
- Educational consultant
- Elevator consultant
- Employment consultant
- Foreclosure consultant
- Legal nurse consultant
- Loss-control consultant
- Media consultant
- Medical practice consultants
- Process consultant
- Sustainability consultant

== Glossary ==
- Benchmarking
- Best practice
- Bird's-eye view
- Board of directors
- Business-to-business
- Competitive intelligence
- Core competency
- Direct-to-consumer
- Due diligence
- Elevator pitch
- End of day
- Gantt chart
- Greenfield investment
- Mission critical
- Opportunity cost
- Pareto principle
- Professional conduct
- Scope creep
- Sea change (idiom)
- Value added

== Frameworks ==
- Balanced scorecard
- Boston Consulting Group's Advantage Matrix
- Growth–share matrix
- Managerial grid model
- McKinsey 7S Framework
- MECE principle
- OGSM
- PEST analysis
- Porter's five forces analysis
- Quality control
- Strategic Grid Model
- SWOT analysis
- Viability study

== Notable firms ==
- Accenture
- Bain & Company
- Boston Consulting Group
- Capgemini
- Deloitte
- Ernst & Young
- Grant Thornton International
- IBM Consulting
- Infosys
  - Infosys Consulting
- KPMG
- McKinsey & Company
- PwC
  - Strategy&
- WSP Global

== Professional bodies ==
- Association of Consulting Engineers New Zealand
- Conference of Consulting Actuaries
- Institute of Consulting
- Institute of Management Consultants USA
- International Council of Management Consulting Institutes
- International Federation of Consulting Engineers

== Certifications ==
- Certified Consulting Meteorologist
- Certified management consultant
- Certified mortgage consultant
- Chartered financial consultant

== See also ==
- Consulting psychology
- List of business terms
- List of former consulting firms
- List of IT consulting firms
- List of life sciences
- List of management consulting firms
- Outline of accounting
- Outline of business
- Outline of management
- Tertiary sector of the economy
