= CMC =

CMC may refer to:

== Arts and media ==
=== Fictional characters ===
- Cutie Mark Crusaders, in My Little Pony: Friendship Is Magic

=== Music ===
==== Music television ====
- Cable Music Channel, a defunct music television channel from Turner Broadcasting System, U.S.
- California Music Channel or CMC-TV, an American music video service
- Country Music Channel, a defunct Australian music television channel provided by Foxtel
- Croatian Music Channel, a Croatian television channel broadcasting Croatian music and music of Croatian production

==== Other uses in music ====
- CMC International, a record label based near London, UK
- Canadian Music Centre, a music venue
- Charlotte Church (b. 1986), Welsh singer, who used their initials CMC on "The Opera Song (Brave New World)"
- Chicago Musical College, a division of Chicago College of Performing Arts at Roosevelt University, US
- Computer Music Center, a center for electronic and computer music research in the US

=== Other uses in arts and media ===
- Caribbean Media Corporation, a Barbados-based content-provider

== Businesses and organizations ==
=== Healthcare institutions ===
==== Bangladesh ====
- Chittagong Medical College or Chittagong Medical College Hospital, a public medical college in Chittagong
- Comilla Medical College, a public medical college in Comilla

==== India ====
- Calicut Medical College, Kozhikode, Kerala
- Christian Medical College & Hospital, Vellore, Tamil Nadu
- Christian Medical College Ludhiana, Punjab
- Coimbatore Medical College, Coimbatore, Tamil Nadu

==== Pakistan ====
- Chandka Medical College, Larkana, Sindh
- Continental Medical College, Lahore, Punjab

==== United States ====
- Carolinas Medical Center, a hospital in the Charlotte, North Carolina
- Catholic Medical Center, a hospital and heart disease institute in Manchester, New Hampshire

==== Elsewhere ====
- Chitwan Medical College, Bharatpur, Chitwan, Nepal
- Caritas Medical Centre, a hospital in Cheung Sha Wan, Hong Kong
- Catholic Medical Center, the eight hospitals attached to the Catholic University of Korea

=== Government, military, and quasi-government agencies ===
- California Men's Colony, a male-only state prison in California, US
- Canadian Meteorological Centre, a provider of forecast guidance to national and regional prediction centres
- Central Military Commission (China)
- Central Military Commission of the Workers' Party of Korea
- Central Military Commission of the Communist Party of Vietnam
- Central Mint, a subsidiary of the Central Bank of the Republic of China (Taiwan)
- Colombo Municipal Council, the local council for Colombo, Sri Lanka
- Crime and Misconduct Commission, an independent entity in Queensland Government, Australia, created to combat major crime
- Cultural Ministers Council, an Australian intergovernmental organisation for ministers of culture and the arts, 1984–2011

=== Manufacturers ===
- CMC Electronics, a Montréal-based avionics company
- CMC Magnetics, a Taiwanese optical disc manufacturer
- CMC Materials Inc, a chemicals company purchased by Entegris in 2022
- Chi Mei Corporation, a plastics producer in Taiwan
- China Motor Corporation, a Taiwanese automobile manufacturer
- Colt's Manufacturing Company, an American firearms manufacturer
- Commercial Metals Company, a steel and metal manufacturer based in Irving, Texas
- Cooper Motor Corporation, a Kenyan car manufacturer

=== Museums ===
- Children's Museum of Cleveland
- Cincinnati Museum Center at Union Terminal, in Cincinnati, Ohio, originally used as a train station

=== Religious organizations ===
- Cambridge Muslim College, Islamic higher education institution in Cambridge, UK
- Christian Mennonite Conference, a small body of Mennonites in western Canada
- Congregation of the Mother Co-Redemptrix, a Vietnamese Roman Catholic religious order
- Conservative Mennonite Conference, now the Rosedale Network of Churches, a mainline Anabaptist body

=== Schools ===
- Cambridge Muslim College, Islamic higher education institution in Cambridge, UK
- Chicago Musical College, a division of Chicago College of Performing Arts at Roosevelt University, US
- Clackamas Middle College, a middle school in Oregon
- Claremont McKenna College, a liberal arts college in Claremont, California
- Colorado Mountain College, a network of seven community colleges in western Colorado
- Copper Mountain College, a community college in Joshua Tree, California

=== Sports organizations ===
- Colorado Mountain Club, a nonprofit outdoor recreation and education organization
- Central Massachusetts Conference, a high school athletic conference organized by Massachusetts Interscholastic Athletic Association
- CMC (basketball), Cercle Municipal de Casablanca, a basketball club in Casablanca, Morocco
- Craig Memorial Cup, a Northern Irish association football tournament

=== Other businesses ===
- CMC (company), an Indian information technology services company
- CMC Markets, an international financial company
- CMC, marketer of coal from the Cerrejón mine in northern Colombia, owned by Anglo American, BHP and Glencore, headquartered in Dublin
- Caribbean Media Corporation, a Barbados-based centralised content-provider
- China Media Capital, a private equity firm
- China National Machinery Import and Export Corporation, an engineering contractor
- Coinmarketcap, a cryptocurrency price tracker and news aggregator
- COMSAT mobile communications, a telecommunications company
- Cyprus Mines Corporation, an early 20th century American mining company based in Cyprus

=== Other organizations ===
- Canadian Meat Council, Canada's national trade association for federally inspected red meat packers and processors
- Cannonball Motorcycle Club, a European outlaw motorcycle club
- Carnegie Moscow Center, a non-profit think tank and regional affiliate of the Carnegie Endowment for International Peace
- Civic Media Center, an alternative library and reading room in Gainesville, Florida
- Cluster Munition Coalition, an international civil society movement campaigning against the use of cluster munitions
- Compact Model Council, a working group in the EDA industry
- Cossacks Motorcycle Club, an American one-percenter style outlaw motorcycle club

== Occupations and positions ==
- Certified Management Consultant, a professional certification for professional management consultants
- Certified Master Chef, the highest level of culinary certification by the American Culinary Federation
- Certified mortgage consultant, a professional certification for mortgage professionals
- Chairman of the NATO Military Committee, chairman of NATO's Military Committee
- Command master chief petty officer, the highest-ranking enlisted sailor aboard a warship in some navies
- Commandant of the United States Marine Corps, the highest-ranking officer of the US Marine Corps

== Science, technology, and mathematics ==
=== Chemistry and medicine ===
- Carboxymethyl cellulose, a cellulose derivative often initialized CMC
- Carpometacarpal joint, a joint in the wrist that articulates the carpal bones and the metacarpals
- Ceramic matrix composite, a subgroup of composite materials as well as a subgroup of technical ceramics
- Chemistry, manufacturing and control, a drug development process
- Chlormadinone caproate, a progestin that was never marketed
- Chronic mucocutaneous candidiasis, an immune disorder characterized by chronic infections with Candida
- Critical micelle concentration, the concentration of surfactants above which micelles are spontaneously formed

=== Computing and electronics ===
- CBC-mask-CBC, a block cipher mode of operation for encrypting hard disks
- Central Management and Control, enterprise data management software for Cruzer Enterprise secure USB drives
- Certificate Management over CMS, an internet standard by the IETF
- Common Messaging Calls, an API client for the Messaging Application Programming Interface
- Community multimedia center or telecentre
- Computer-mediated communication, any form of data exchange across two or more networked computers
- Constraint Monte Carlo algorithm that uses random sampling for computer simulations
- Common-mode choke, in electronics, a special type of choke

=== Other uses in science, technology, and mathematics ===
- Global Environmental Multiscale Model, also known as CMC in North America
- Conditional mean closure, a combustion model for CFD
- Constant mean curvature, a differential-geometric property of some surfaces

== Other uses ==
- C-M-C', a form of commodity trade in the theory of Karl Marx
- Christian McCaffrey, American football running back
- Coastal minelayer (CMc), a US Navy hull classification
- Commonwealth Code, the territorial law of the Northern Mariana Islands
- Cuban Missile Crisis, a 13-day confrontation between the U.S. and the Soviet Union

== See also ==
- Cybersecurity Maturity Model Certification (CMMC)
