= EN 16114 =

EN 16114 "Management consultancy services" was a European Union standard published by the European Committee for Standardization (CEN) on September 28, 2011. It focuses on the providing of management consulting services by management consultancy service providers (MCSPs). It was superseded by ISO 20700 in 2018.

== History ==
The standard was developed by CEN project committee CEN/PC 381. The group started work on EN 16114 on 8 and 9 September 2008 in Milan at the offices of APCO and the Italian standardization body (UNI), managed with the technical secretariat of UNI.

Three years later, the standard was first presented on November 9, 2011 at an event in Brussels at the headquarters of CEN and European Committee for Electrotechnical Standardization (CENELEC) in the presence of representatives from the European Union and the International Council of Management Consulting Institutes (ICMCI) and the European Federation of Management Consultancies Associations (FEACO).

Subsequently, in the year 2016, the CEN has turned the PC 381 (Project Committee) that was created to the design of the standard EN 16114, into TC 381 (Technical Committee) permanent regulatory committee for the sector Management Consultancy Services.

Following the publication of EN ISO 20700, the EN 16114 standard was withdrawn by CEN on September 5, 2018.

== Main requirements of the standard ==
The EN 16114 adopted the following structure:

1. Purpose
2. Normative references
3. Terms and definitions
4. Principles
5. Offering
6. Execution
7. Closure

== Features ==
The European standard provided guidance for the effective provision of management consulting services. The standard was applicable to all MCSPs in both the public and private sectors. The standard applied to any type of assignment of management for any type of customer advice. It does not place any obligation to the customer. The standard provides recommendations for the conduct of management consulting services, including:

- The legal and ethical issues (point 4);
- Management, communication and evaluation (step 4);
- Customer relations (point 4);
- Proposal and agreement (paragraph 5);
- Planning and execution (point 6);
- Closure (item 7).

The standard was independent of other regulatory or regulatory documents, such as:

- of small business support provision (see CEN/TS 99001);
- management systems for quality (see EN ISO 9001);
- public contracts (see the Public Procurement Directive 2004/18/EC).

The rule did not impose or interfere with any contractual obligations or intellectual property rights. Furthermore, it did not require or imply the need for third-party certification. It was not intended for certification, regulatory or contractual use, and was not intended nor designed to be used as a basis for personal or organizational status.

Since 2011, the EN 16114 standard was the main reference for the profession of Management Consultant until it was superseded by international standard ISO 20700 in 2018.

== Versions ==
Year	Description
2011	EN 16114 (1st Edition - Withdrawn 2018-09-05)

== See also ==
- List of EN standards
- List of ISO standards
