= Management consulting =

Consulting services that help organizations to improve their performance

Management consulting is the practice of providing consulting services to organizations to improve their performance or in any way to assist in achieving organizational objectives. Organizations may draw upon the services of management consultants for a number of reasons, including gaining external (and presumably objective) advice and accessing consultants' specialized expertise regarding concerns that call for additional oversight.

As a result of their exposure to and relationships with numerous organizations, consulting firms are typically aware of industry "best practices". However, the specific nature of situations under consideration may limit the ability or appropriateness of transferring such practices from one organization to another. Management consulting is an additional service to internal management functions and, for various legal and practical reasons, may not be seen as a replacement for internal management. Unlike interim management, management consultants do not become part of the organization to which they provide services.

Consultancies provide services such as: organizational change management assistance, development of coaching skills, process analysis, technology implementation, strategy development, or operational improvement services. Management consultants often bring their own proprietary methodologies or frameworks to guide the identification of problems and to serve as the basis for recommendations with a view to more effective or efficient ways of performing work tasks.

The economic function of management consulting firms is in general to help and facilitate the development, rationalization and optimization of the various markets pertaining to the geographic areas and jurisdictions in which they operate. However, the exact nature of the value of such a service model may vary greatly across markets and its description is therefore contingent. (Note: In other words, subject to market demand.)

== History ==
Management consulting grew with the rise of management, as a unique field of study. One of the first management consulting firms was Arthur D. Little Inc., founded in 1886 as a partnership, and later incorporated in 1909. Although Arthur D. Little later became a general management consultancy, it originally specialized in technical research.

As Arthur D. Little focused on technical research for the first few years, the first management consultancy was that of Frederick Winslow Taylor, who in 1893 opened an independent consulting practice in Philadelphia. His business card read "Consulting Engineer – Systematizing Shop Management and Manufacturing Costs a Specialty". By inventing Scientific Management, also known as Taylor's method, Frederick Winslow Taylor invented the first method of organizing work, spawning the careers of many more management consultants. For example, one of Taylor's early collaborators, Morris Llewellyn Cooke, opened his own management consultancy in 1905. Taylor's method was used worldwide until industry switched to a method invented by W. Edwards Deming.

The initial period of growth in the consulting industry was triggered by the Glass–Steagall Banking Act in the 1930s, and was driven by demand for advice on finance, strategy and organization. From the 1950s onwards, consultancies expanded their activities considerably in the United States, and also opened offices in Europe and later in Asia and South America.

The management consulting firms Stern Stewart, Marakon Associates, and Alcar pioneered value-based management (VBM), or "managing for value", in the 1980s based on the academic work of Joel Stern, Bill Alberts, and Professor Alfred Rappaport. Other consulting firms including McKinsey and BCG developed VBM approaches. Value-based management became prominent during the late 1980s and 1990s.

The industry experienced significant growth in the 1980s and 1990s, gaining considerable importance in relation to national gross domestic product.

A period of significant growth in the early 1980s was driven by demand for strategy and organizational consulting services. The wave of growth in the 1990s was driven by demand for both strategy and information technology consulting. In the second half of the 1980s, the major accounting firms entered the IT consulting segment. The then Big Eight, now Big Four, accounting firms (PricewaterhouseCoopers, KPMG, Ernst & Young and Deloitte Touche Tohmatsu) had always offered advice in addition to their traditional services, but after the late 1980s these activities became increasingly important in relation to the maturing market of accounting and auditing. By the mid-1990s these firms had outgrown those service providers focusing on corporate strategy and organization. While three of the Big Four legally divided the different service lines after the Enron scandal and the ensuing breakdown of Arthur Andersen, they are now back in the consulting business. In 2000, Andersen Consulting broke off from Arthur Andersen and announced their new name Accenture. The name change was effective starting January 1, 2001, and Accenture is currently the largest consulting firm in the world in employee headcount. They are publicly traded on the NYSE with ticker ACN.

The industry stagnated in 2001 before recovering after 2003 and then enjoying a period of sustained double-digit annual revenue growth until the 2008 financial crisis. As financial services and government were two of the largest spenders on consulting services, the 2008 financial crisis and the resulting public sector austerity drives hit consulting revenues hard. In some markets such as the UK there was a recession in the consulting industry, something which had never happened before or since. There has been a gradual recovery in the consulting industry's growth rate in the intervening years, with a current trend towards a clearer segmentation of management consulting firms. In recent years, management consulting firms actively recruit top graduates from Ivy League universities, Rhodes Scholars, and students from top MBA programs.

In more recent times, traditional management consulting firms have had to face increasing challenges from disruptive online marketplaces that are aiming to cater to the increasing number of freelance management consulting professionals.

== Function ==
The functions of consulting services are commonly broken down into eight task categories. Consultants can function as bridges for information and knowledge, and external consultants can provide these bridging services more economically than client firms themselves. Consultants can be engaged proactively, without significant external enforcement, and reactively, with external pressure. Proactive consultant engagement is engaged mainly with aim to find hidden weak spots and improve performance, while the reactive consultant engagement is mostly aimed at solving problems identified by external stakeholders.

Marvin Bower, McKinsey's long-term director, has mentioned the benefits of a consultant's externality, that they have varied experience outside the client company.

Management consulting could be classified into two categories:

- General management consulting, which concerns strategy, corporate finance, organization, environmental social and corporate governance, risk and compliance, and so forth. It entails questions that are relevant to the entirety of the client organization as a whole, on a management level.
- Specialized management consulting, which concerns questions that are specific to a certain function or subset of the client organization, such as legal management consulting, financial management consulting, digital management consulting, technology management consulting, operations management consulting, and Executive search.

Management consulting often involves a mix of both of these categories. In the modern economic environment, management consulting firms are typically classified under the umbrella term of corporate service providers.

Consultants have specialized skills on tasks that would involve high internal coordination costs for clients, such as organization-wide changes or the implementation of information technology. In addition, because of economies of scale, consultants' focus on and experience in gathering information across markets and industries enables a higher cost-efficiency than if clients were to perform research themselves.

== Trends ==
=== Big Three management consultancies ===
Three consulting firms are widely regarded as the Big Three or MBB:

- McKinsey & Company
- Boston Consulting Group
- Bain & Company

=== Big Four accounting firms in the management consulting market ===
The Big Four audit firms (Deloitte, KPMG, PwC, Ernst & Young) have been working in the strategy consulting market since 2010. In 2013, Deloitte acquired Monitor Group—now Monitor Deloitte—while PwC acquired PRTM in 2011 and Booz & Company in 2013—now Strategy&. From 2010 to 2013, several Big Four firms have tried to acquire Roland Berger. EY followed the trend, with acquisitions of The Parthenon Group in 2014, and both the BeNeLux and French businesses of OC&C in 2016 and 2017, with all now under the EY-Parthenon brand.

Firm	Revenues	Fiscal year	Source
Deloitte	$20.8bn	2021	Deloitte
PricewaterhouseCoopers (PwC)	$14.7bn	2020	PwC
Ernst & Young (EY)	$14.6bn	2020	EY
KPMG	$11.7bn	2020	KPMG

=== Trends ===
In 2013, an article in Harvard Business Review discussed the prevalent trends within the consulting industry to evolve. The authors noted that with knowledge being democratized and information becoming more and more accessible to anyone, the role of management consultants is rapidly changing. Moreover, with more online platforms that connect business executives to relevant consultants, the role of the traditional 'firm' is being questioned.

Large management consulting firms and professional networks have adopted a structure of industry-specific branches, with one branch per industry or market segment served. As such, the firms utilize their ability to serve as knowledge brokers within each market segment and industry addressed.

== Nonprofit consultants ==
Some for-profit consulting firms, including McKinsey and BCG, offer consulting services to nonprofits at subsidized rates as a form of corporate social responsibility. Other for-profit firms have spun off nonprofit consulting organizations, e.g. Bain creating Bridgespan.

Many firms outside of the Big Three offer management consulting services to nonprofits, philanthropies, and mission-driven organizations. Some, but not all, are nonprofits themselves.

== Liability ==
As with all client-contractor work, liability depends heavily on the subject of contract terms. While the management consulting service provider for obvious reasons has a business reputation to protect, legally there is little protection for the client. This is due to the scope of the contract being the only thing subject to potential insurance claims as well as lawsuits.

As with other client-contractor relationships, settling for liabilities that exist outside the scope of the contract deliverables has been proven to be of considerable difficulty, also in management consulting. For this reason, it is important that clients procuring management consulting services think twice about what type of help they need, so that the scope, length and content of contract reflects such need.

== Criticism ==
Management consultants are sometimes criticized for the overuse of buzzwords, reliance on and propagation of management fads, and a failure to develop plans that are executable by the client. As stated above, management consulting is an unregulated profession; anyone or any company can style themselves as management consultants. A number of critical books about management consulting argue that the mismatch between management consulting advice and the ability of executives to actually create the change suggested results in substantial damages to existing businesses. In his book, Flawed Advice and the Management Trap, Chris Argyris believes that much of the advice given today has real merit. However, a close examination shows that most advice given today contains gaps and inconsistencies that may prevent positive outcomes in the future.

Ichak Adizes and coauthors also criticize the timing of consultant services. Client organizations, which are usually lacking the knowledge they want to obtain from the consultant, cannot correctly estimate the right timing for an engagement of consultants. Consultants are usually engaged too late when problems become visible to the top of the client's organizational pyramid. A proactive checkup, like a regular medical checkup, is recommended. On the other side, this opens additional danger for abuse from disreputable practitioners.

== International standards ==
ISO published the international standard ISO 20700 Guidelines for Management Consultancy Services on June 1, 2017, replacing EN 16114.

This document represents the first international standard for the management consultancy industry.

== Training and certification ==
An international qualification for a management consulting practitioner is Certified Management Consultant (CMC) available in the United States through the Institute of Management Consultants USA. Additional trainings and courses exist, often as part of an MBA training; see Master of Business Administration § Content.

== See also ==
- Big Three (management consultancies)
- Big Four accounting firms
- Business development
- Business process re-engineering
- Consultant
- Consulting firm
- ICMCI
- Industrial engineering
- Industrial psychology
- Institute of Consulting
- Knowledge economy
- Management cybernetics
- Management science
- Operations management
- Organizational development
- Organizational psychology
- Organizational studies
- Outline of consulting
- Outline of management
- Strategic management
