= Cooperative research and development agreement =

In the United States, a cooperative research and development agreement (CRADA or CRDA) is an agreement between a government agency and another government agency, a private company, non-profit, or university to work together on research and development.

== Description ==
Designated under the Federal Technology Transfer Act of 1986 (P.L. 99-502) (which amended the Stevenson-Wydler Technology Innovation Act of 1980 (P.L. 96-480)), a CRADA is intended to speed the commercialization of technology, optimize resources, and protect the private company involved. A CRADA allows both parties to keep research results confidential for up to five years under the Freedom of Information Act. The Office of Scientific and Technical Information (OSTI) is responsible for preserving the scientific and technical information generated through a CRADA and making this information readily available to the scientific community as well as the public.

Private corporations participating in a CRADA are allowed to file for patent, and they retain patent rights on inventions developed by the CRADA. The government gets a license to the patents.

== See also ==
- Small Business Innovation Research
- Technology transfer
- Research and development agreement
