= Orta =

Orta may refer to:

== Places ==
- Orta, Møre og Romsdal, an island in Aukra, Norway
- Orta, Çankırı, a district of Çankırı Province, Turkey
- Orta, a town near Rome which, in medieval contexts, may also be called Orte
- Lake Orta, in north Italy
- Orta di Atella, comune in the Province of Caserta in the Italian region Campania
- Orta Nova, town and comune from Foggia, in the region of Apulia, in southern Italy
- Orta San Giulio, a town on Lake Orta
- Orta, Tavas, populated place in Denizli Province, Turkey
- Orta, Tuzla

== People ==
- Garcia de Orta (1501 – 1568) Portuguese physician, herbalist and naturalist
- Jorge Orta (born 1950), Mexican Major League Baseball player
- Lucy Orta, a British contemporary artist
- Ramsey Orta, a friend of Eric Garner's who recorded on his cell phone the police murdering Garner

== Other uses ==
- Orta (Janissary), a military rank of Janissaries
- Orta, a fictional Italian village in the film Captain Carey, U.S.A.
- Office of Research and Technology Applications (ORTA), an organizational structure established in federal laboratories though the Stevenson-Wydler Technology Innovation Act of 1980 (P.L. 96-480)-Wydler Technology Innovation Act of 1980 (P.L. 96-480)
- Panzer Dragoon Orta, the describer and heroine of the fourth game in the Panzer Dragoon series
- Oak Ridges Trail Association
