= Aja Barber =

American fashion activist and writer

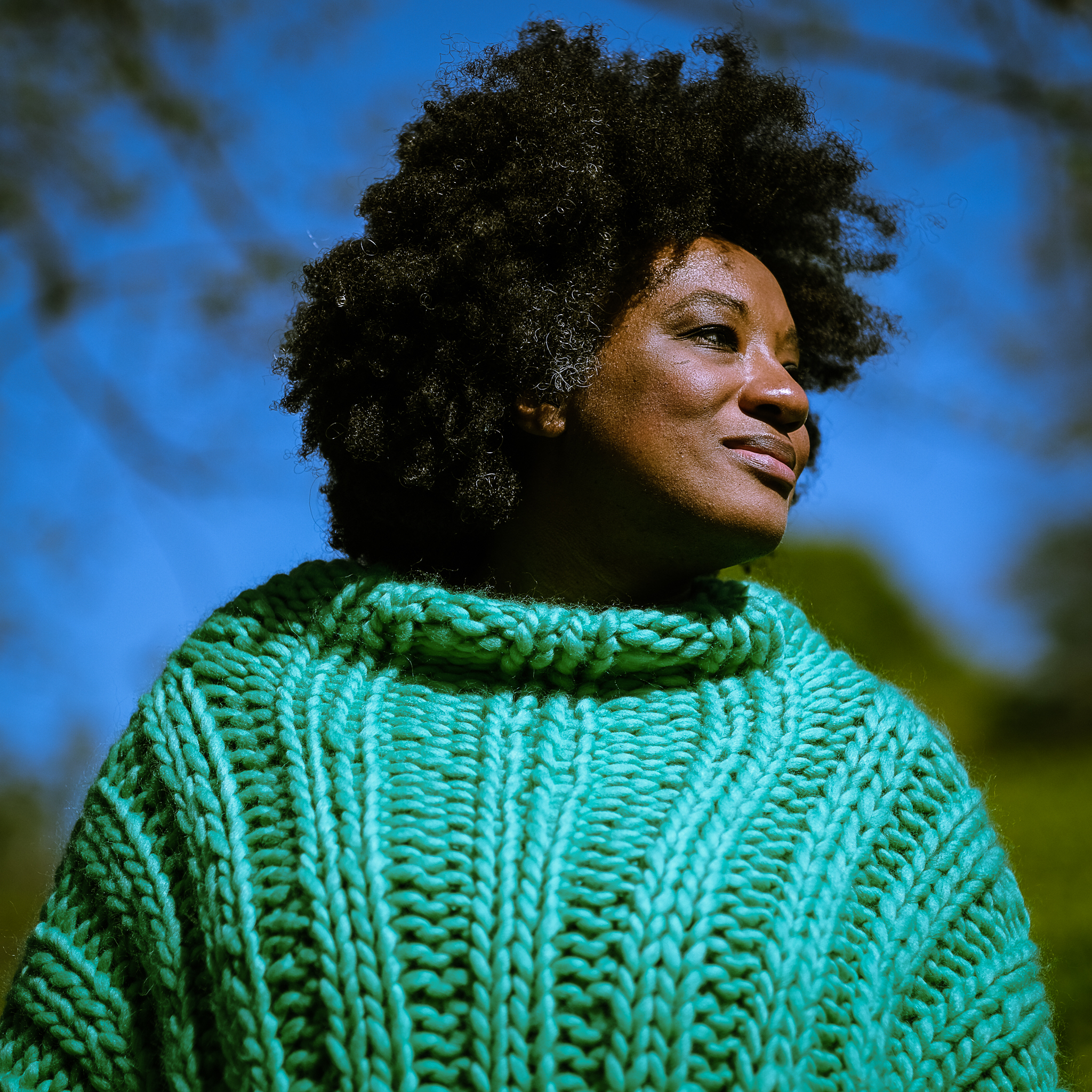
- Born: Reston, Virginia, United States
- Occupations: Sustainability consultant, author, activist
- Notable work: Consumed: The Need for Collective Change: Colonialism, Climate Change, and Consumerism (2021)
- Website: www.ajabarber.com

Aja Barber is a writer, sustainability consultant, and activist who promotes ethical consumerism and warns against the environmental impact of fashion, especially fast fashion. Barber advocates for ethical and sustainable fashion and fair treatment of garment workers within the fashion industry.

== Life and work ==
Barber was born in Reston, Virginia. As a child, she recalls wanting to either be a published author or a ballerina. As a young adult, Barber pursued internships in the fashion industry, in addition to blogging and writing about fashion.

Barber is a critic of fast fashion, and admits to being a "fast fashion shopper" herself when she was younger. She cites both peer pressure and larger societal pressure into buying lots of clothes and accessories, even to the point of purchasing items she didn't actually like or appreciate. As Barber became more aware of both the environmental impacts of fashion and the impact on the workers producing the clothing, she reduced her consumption of new clothing items and primarily focused on purchasing second-hand clothes. Barber advocates for shopping at local consignment stores and other places where the consumer can talk directly to the seller about their business practices.

During the COVID-19 pandemic, Barber became aware of larger pushback against fast fashion. In 2021, she published her first book: Consumed: The Need for Collective Change: Colonialism, Climate Change, and Consumerism, which explores "the intersections of consumerism, racism and climate change". The book links clothing consumerism to historical forces of colonialism and capitalism. Consumed was called a "powerful cry to opt out of consumption culture", and praised for its coverage of the environmental impact of fashion. The book cites environmental scientist Roland Geyer who quantifies how much CO_{2} would be reduced if industry started to pay garment workers a living wage.

After publishing Consumed, Barber cites the positive reaction she got from non-white women, and how they "felt seen within the work". Barber planned to publish her second book, Bad Vibes, through Brazen, in July 2025, but it has been delayed until 2027.

== Works ==
- Consumed: The Need for Collective Change: Colonialism, Climate Change, and Consumerism: Balance (2021). ISBN 9781538709849
- Bad Vibes: Octopus (2027).

== See also ==
- Anti-sweatshop movement
- Consumerism
- Ethical consumerism
