= Federal Technology Transfer Act of 1986 =

- Long title: An Act to amend the Stevenson-Wydler Technology Innovation Act of 1980 to promote technology transfer by authorizing Government-operated laboratories to enter into cooperative research agreements and by establishing a Federal Laboratory Consortium for Technology Transfer within the National Science Foundation, and for other purposes.
- Enacted by: the 99th United States Congress
- Effective: October 20, 1986

Citations
- Public law: 99-502
- Statutes at Large: 100 Stat. 1785

Codification
- Titles amended: 15 U.S.C.: Commerce and Trade
- U.S.C. sections amended: Chapter 63 § 3701

Legislative history
- Introduced in the House as H.R. 3773 by Don Fuqua (D–FL) on November 18, 1985; Committee consideration by House Science and Technology, Senate Commerce, Science, and Transportation, Senate Judiciary, Subcommittee on Patents, Copyrights and Trademarks; Passed the House on December 9, 1985 (agreed/passed); Passed the Senate on August 9, 1986 (agreed/passed); Reported by the joint conference committee on October 2, 1986; agreed to by the Senate on October 3, 1986 (agreed) and by the House on October 7, 1986 (agreed); Signed into law by President Ronald Reagan on October 20, 1986

The United States Federal Technology Transfer Act of 1986 (P.L. 99-502) was, after the Stevenson-Wydler Technology Innovation Act of 1980, the second major piece of legislation focused on technology transfer from federal government agencies to the commercial sector. The act established the Federal Laboratory Consortium and enabled federal laboratories to enter into Cooperative Research and Development Agreements (CRADAs) and to negotiate licenses for patented inventions made at the laboratory.

== Follow up legislation ==
The 'Small Business Technology Transfer Act of 1992' was enacted to increase opportunities for small businesses and non profit organizations to collaborate with federal research laboratories. Agencies with a more than $1 billion extramural research and development budget must reserve 0.3% of their extramural research budget for Small Business Technology Transfer (STTR) awards.

In parallel, in December 1992, the related 'Small Business Research and Development Enhancement Act' (P.L. 102-564) was passed to reauthorize the Small Business Innovation Research (SBIR) program for joint ventures until September 30, 2000. The 'Small Business Reauthorization Act of 2000' (P.L. 106-554) reauthorized the program until September 30, 2008. Numerous extensions passed with the most recent one extending the SBIR program through 2022. It is to "incentivize and enable startups and small business to undertake R&D with high technical risk and high commercial reward."

== See also ==
- Bayh–Dole Act of 1980 (P.L. 96-517)
- Executive Order 12591 (1987)
- Executive Order 12999: Educational Technology
- Office of Research and Technology Applications
- Stevenson-Wydler Technology Innovation Act of 1980 (P.L. 96-480)
