= Institute of Management Consultants USA =

Professional association in the US

The Institute of Management Consultants USA (IMC USA) is a professional association and the sole certifying body for individual management consultants in the United States. It awards the Certified Management Consultant (CMC) as an evidence of professional consulting experience, technical competence, client satisfaction and adherence to rigorous ethical standards. The CMC is recognized by 46 countries and accredited by the International Council of Management Consulting Institutes (ICMCI).

Founded in 1968, IMC USA has a mission to "promote excellence and ethics in management consulting through certification, education and professional resources." It provides professional development resources and events, business management resources, certification and business development support to members in its 20 chapters in the major U.S. cities. Every year, It holds a national conference. Its primary activities include conducting surveys of business and consulting, offering a consultant search service, publishing a set of professional standards, has a Code of Ethics and enforcement procedures, and maintains the Management Consulting Common Body of Knowledge and a Management Consulting Competency Framework, which support its certification process. IMC USA members are in almost every industry and consulting discipline and work as consultants in global consulting firms, boutique firms and independent consulting practices, and as internal consultants in non-consulting firms, non-profits and public sector organizations.

In 2010, The Institute of Management Consultants USA (IMC USA) has been accredited for its Certified Management Consultants (CMC®) certification process by the International Organization for Standardization (ISO).
