= Federal Laboratory Consortium =

The Federal Laboratory Consortium for Technology Transfer (FLC) is a United States-based nationwide network of federal laboratories that provides a forum to develop strategies and opportunities to help transfer laboratory mission technologies into commercial products for the global marketplace.

The FLC was organized in 1974 and formally chartered by the Federal Technology Transfer Act of 1986. Its host agency is the National Institute of Standards and Technology. More than 250 federal laboratories and centers and their parent departments and agencies are currently FLC members. In accordance with the Act and related federal policy, the FLC's mission is to promote and facilitate the rapid movement of federal laboratory research results and technologies into the mainstream of the U.S. economy.

Specifically, the FLC develops and tests transfer methods, addresses barriers to the process, provides training, highlights grass-roots transfer efforts, and emphasizes national initiatives in which technology transfer has a role. For the public and private sectors, the FLC brings laboratories together with potential developers and users of government-owned technologies. The FLC seeks to add value to the federal agencies, laboratories, and their partners to accomplish the rapid integration of research and development resources into commercial products. The Consortium's vision is to actively promote the fullest application and use of federal research and development by providing an environment for successful technology transfer, thereby enhancing the socioeconomic well-being of the United States in the world.

== Legislation ==
- Stevenson-Wydler Technology Innovation Act of 1980 (P.L. 96-480)
- Bayh–Dole Act of 1980 (P.L. 96-517)
- Federal Technology Transfer Act of 1986 (P.L. 99-502)
- Executive Order 12591 (1987)
- Office of Research and Technology Applications
