= Tommy Vitolo =

American energy consultant and politician

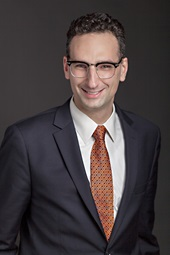

Member of the Massachusetts House of Representatives from the 15th Norfolk District
- Incumbent
- Assumed office January 2, 2019
- Preceded by: Frank Smizik

Personal details
- Born: 1978 (age 47–48)
- Party: Democratic
- Spouse: Jennifer Taranto (m. 2004)
- Children: 2
- Education: North Carolina State University (BS); Dublin City University (MS); Boston University (PhD)

Tommy Vitolo (born 1978) is an American energy consultant and politician who represents the 15th Norfolk District in the Massachusetts House of Representatives from 2019 to present.

== Early life and education ==
Vitolo grew up in Connecticut and attended high school at the Kent School in Connecticut. He earned a B.S from North Carolina State University as a Park Scholar, an M.S. from Dublin City University as a Mitchell Scholar, and a Ph.D. in systems engineering from Boston University.

== Professional career ==
Vitolo worked as an energy consultant and expert witness for Synapse Energy Economics, a public interest-oriented consulting firm in Cambridge, Massachusetts. Before joining Synapse, Vitolo worked at the Massachusetts Institute of Technology Lincoln Laboratory.

== Personal life ==
Vitolo is married to Jennifer Taranto, has two school-aged children, and lives in Brookline, Massachusetts.

== See also ==
- 2019–2020 Massachusetts legislature
- 2021–2022 Massachusetts legislature
- 2022–2023 Massachusetts legislature
- 2023–2024 Massachusetts legislature
