= Title 15 of the Code of Federal Regulations =

U.S. federal rules and regulations on commerce and foreign trade

Title 15 is the portion of the Code of Federal Regulations that governs Commerce and Foreign Trade within the United States. It is available in digital or printed form.

Title 15 comprises three volumes, and is divided into four Subtitles:

- Subtitle A — Office of the Secretary of Commerce
- Subtitle B — Regulations Relating to Commerce and Foreign Trade
- Subtitle C — Regulations Relating to Foreign Trade Agreements
- Subtitle D — Regulations Relating to Telecommunications and Information

== Subtitle A: Office of the Secretary of Commerce ==
Subtitle A (§§ 0-29) covers regulations associated with the office of the U.S. Secretary of Commerce, and is primarily concerned with conduct of, restrictions on, and disciplinary proceedings concerning employees of that office. Subtitle A occupies a portion of volume 1.

== Subtitle B: Regulations Relating to Commerce and Foreign Trade ==
Subtitle B covers Regulations Relating to Commerce and Foreign Trade. It begins in volume 1 and continues through volume 3. Subtitle B consists of the following chapters:

| Volume | Chapter | Sections | Scope |
|---|---|---|---|
| 1 | I | 30-199 | Bureau of the Census (Department of Commerce) |
| 1 | II | 200-299 | National Institute of Standards and Technology (Department of Commerce) |
| 2 | III | 300-399 | International Trade Administration (Department of Commerce) |
| 2 | IV | 400-499 | Foreign-Trade Zones Board (Department of Commerce) |
| 2 | VII | 700-799 | Bureau of Industry and Security (Department of Commerce) |
| 3 | VIII | 800-899 | Bureau of Economic Analysis (Department of Commerce) |
| 3 | IX | 900-999 | National Oceanic and Atmospheric Administration (Department of Commerce) |
| 3 | XI | 1100-1199 | Technology Administration (Department of Commerce) |
| 3 | XIII | 1300-1399 | East-West Foreign Trade Board |
| 3 | XIV | 1400-1499 | Minority Business Development Agency |

== Subtitle C: Regulations Relating to Foreign Trade Agreements ==
Subtitle C (§§ 2000–2099) comprises regulations relating to foreign trade agreements administered by the Office of the United States Trade Representative. Subtitle C occupies a portion of volume 3.

== Subtitle D: Regulations Relating to Telecommunications and Information ==
Subtitle D (§§ 2300–2399) comprises regulations relating to the National Telecommunications and Information Administration (Department of Commerce) and concludes volume 3.
