= Massachusetts House of Representatives' 15th Norfolk district =

American legislative district

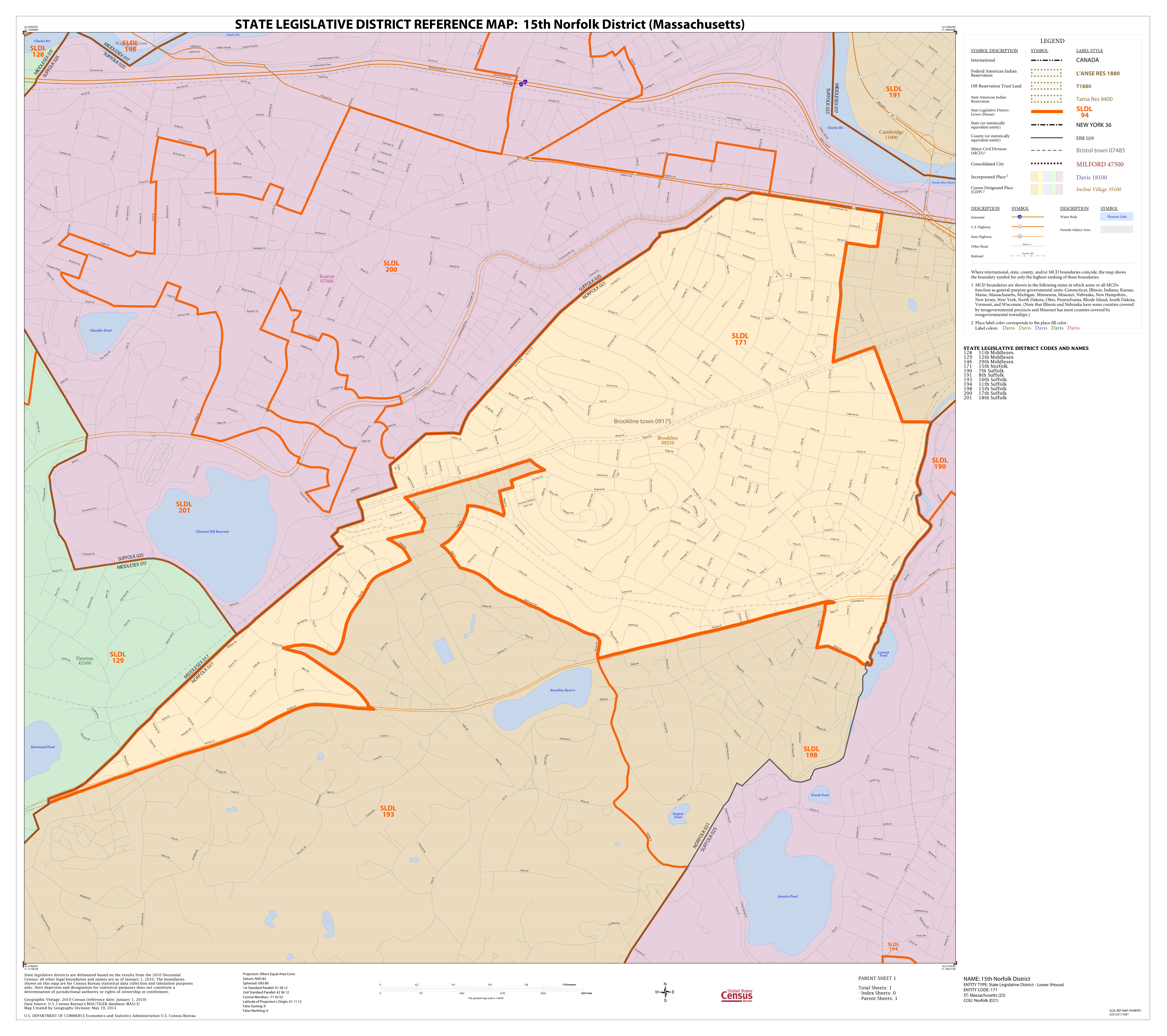
Map of Massachusetts House of Representatives' 15th Norfolk district, based on the 2010 United States census.

Massachusetts House of Representatives' 15th Norfolk district in the United States is one of 160 legislative districts included in the lower house of the Massachusetts General Court. It covers part of Brookline in Norfolk County. Democrat Tommy Vitolo has represented the district since 2019.

The current district geographic boundary overlaps with that of the Massachusetts Senate's Norfolk and Middlesex district.

== Representatives ==
- Marty Linsky
- Bruce H. Zeiser
- Royall H. Switzler
- John A. Businger, 1979-1999
- Ronny M. Sydney, 1999-2001
- Frank Israel Smizik, 2001-2019
- Tommy Vitolo, 2019-current

== See also ==
- List of Massachusetts House of Representatives elections
- List of Massachusetts General Courts
- Other Norfolk County districts of the Massachusetts House of Representatives: 1st, 2nd, 3rd, 4th, 5th, 6th, 7th, 8th, 9th, 10th, 11th, 12th, 13th, 14th
- List of former districts of the Massachusetts House of Representatives

== Images ==
Portraits of legislators

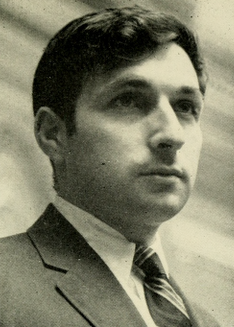
Marty Linsky

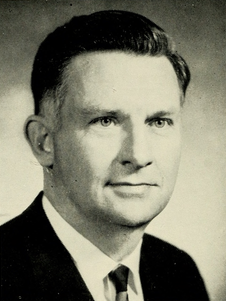
Bruce Zeiser

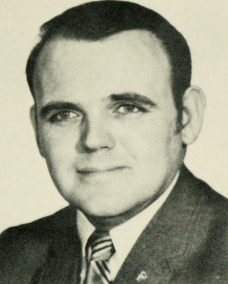
Royall H. Switzler

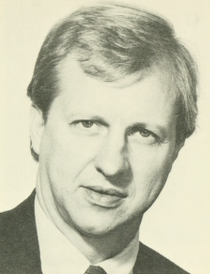
John Businger

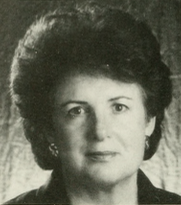
Ronny M. Sydney

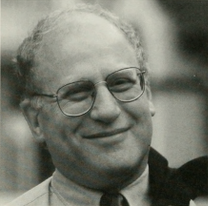
Frank Smizik

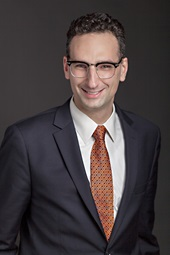
Tommy Vitolo
