= ISO 20700 =

Guideline for management consulting services

ISO 20700 Guidelines for management consultancy services is an international standard developed for use as a guideline for people or organizations for the effective management of management consulting services. The standard offers practical guidelines to both clients and management consultants to ensure both parties are clear on what is required for an effective and efficient consultancy process, the objectives and their respective responsibilities.

The standard was developed by ISO project committee ISO/PC 280. ISO 20700 was published for the first time in 2017.

In 2018, CEN published EN ISO 20700:2018 and withdrew EN 16114 in 2019.

ISO 20700 correlates with EN 16114.

== Main requirements of the standard ==
The ISO 20700:2017 adopt the following structure:

1. Purpose
2. Normative references
3. Terms and definitions
4. Principles
5. Contracting
6. Execution
7. Closure

== See also ==
- EN 16114
- List of ISO standards
- International Organization for Standardization
- ICMCI
- Outline of management
