= Technology Administration =

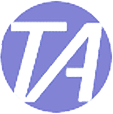

The Technology Administration (TA) was an agency in the United States Department of Commerce that worked with United States industries to promote economic competitiveness. The TA used the web domain technology.gov. The TA was most recently led by former Under Secretary of Commerce for Technology Robert Cresanti.

The TA oversaw three agencies:

- National Institute of Standards and Technology (NIST)
- National Technical Information Service (NTIS)
- Office of Technology Policy (OTP)

== History ==
The Technology Administration was created by the Stevenson-Wydler Technology Innovation Act of 1980, 15 U.S.C. 3704.

The TA was abolished by the America COMPETES Act of 2007. NIST and NTIS continue on as agencies. The Office of Technology Policy was abolished.

== Office of Technology Policy ==
The Office of Technology Policy (OTP) was an office of the Technology Administration. The office worked with industry to promote competitiveness and advocated integrated policies for maximizing the impact of technology on economic growth. The OTP's stated goals included the creation of high-wage jobs and improvements in the United States' quality of life.

== See also ==
- Title 15 of the Code of Federal Regulations
