= Ronny Sydney =

American politician

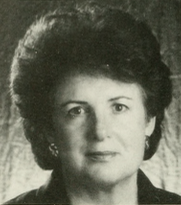

Member of the Massachusetts House of Representatives from the 15th Norfolk district
- In office January 6, 1999 – January 3, 2001
- Preceded by: John Businger
- Succeeded by: Frank Smizik

Personal details
- Born: Ronny Jane Metz; July 10, 1938 (age 88) Brooklyn, New York, U.S.
- Party: Democratic
- Education: University of Massachusetts Amherst (BA); Newton College (MEd); Boston College (JD)

Ronny Jane Sydney (née Metz; born July 10, 1938) is an American teacher, lawyer, and politician who represented the 15th Norfolk District in the Massachusetts House of Representatives from 1999 to 2001.

== Early life and education ==
She was born on July 10, 1938, in Brooklyn, New York, to Ruth Frankel and M. Stanley Metz.

She graduated from the University of Massachusetts Amherst with a Bachelor of Arts degree in Sociology in 1960, Newton College with a Master of Education degree in 1972, and from Boston College Law School with a Juris Doctor in 1987.

She later became a teacher working for the Brookline Public School district.

== Legal career ==
She has practiced law in Boston and Brookline. She formerly practiced law with Israel, Van Kooy & Days, LLC.

== Political career ==
She was a member and later chair of the Brookline Board of Selectmen from 1992 to 1998.

=== Massachusetts House of Representatives ===
In 1998, Sydney defeated 14-term incumbent John Businger in the Democratic primary for the 15th Norfolk District House seat by 35 votes. She ran unopposed in the general election.

In 2000, Sydney lost to Brookline School Committee member Frank Smizik 2,517 votes to 2,336.

=== Broward County Democratic Party ===
Between 2017 and 2018 she served as an area leader for the Broward County Democratic Party representing Coconut Creek and Margate in Florida.

== Post-political career ==
She was later a family law attorney for the BNI Brookline Networkers. She is now retired from practicing law and resides in Coconut Creek, Florida.
