= John Businger =

American politician

John A. Businger
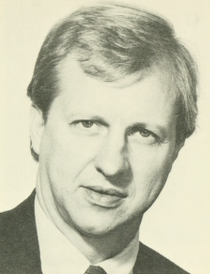
- Portrait of John A. Businger

Member of the Massachusetts House of Representatives
- In office January 6, 1971 – January 6, 1999
- Preceded by: Jack Backman
- Succeeded by: Ronny Sydney
- Constituency: 13th Norfolk district (1971-1975); 21st Norfolk district (1975-1979); 15th Norfolk district (1979-1999)

Personal details
- Born: February 5, 1945 (age 81) Cleveland, Ohio, U.S.
- Party: Democratic
- Education: Boston College (AB)

John A. Businger (born February 5, 1945) is an American politician who served in the Massachusetts House of Representatives from 1971 to 1999.

Since leaving the legislature, Businger has continued to advocate for causes that had animated him in office, including infrastructure projects such as the North-South Rail Link.

In 2010, Common Cause Massachusetts gave Businger their Legislative Achievement Award. Common Cause Massachusetts is a non-partisan advocacy group dedicated to governmental transparency,

== See also ==
- 1971–1972 Massachusetts legislature
- 1973–1974 Massachusetts legislature
- 1975–1976 Massachusetts legislature
- 1977–1978 Massachusetts legislature
- 1979–1980 Massachusetts legislature
- 1981–1982 Massachusetts legislature
- 1983–1984 Massachusetts legislature
- 1985–1986 Massachusetts legislature
- 1987–1988 Massachusetts legislature
- 1989–1990 Massachusetts legislature
- 1991–1992 Massachusetts legislature
- 1993–1994 Massachusetts legislature
- 1995–1996 Massachusetts legislature
- 1997–1998 Massachusetts legislature
