= Executive Order 12999 =

1996 United States executive order

Executive Order 12999 is a United States Presidential Executive Order signed on April 17, 1996, by President Bill Clinton which permits U.S. federal agencies to transfer excess computers and related peripherals to educational and nonprofit 501(c)(3) organizations.

This order extended Executive Order 12821, which was signed by President George H.W. Bush on November 16, 1992.

== Provisions of 12999: Educational Technology ==
The Executive Order has three core elements for the development of American education and educational organizations.

1) Protection of Educationally Useful Federal Equipment

Executive departments and agencies shall protect and safeguard such equipment, particularly when declared excess or surplus, so that it may be recycled and transferred in accordance with 12999.

2) Efficient Transfer of Educationally Useful Federal Equipment to Schools and Nonprofit Organizations

All agencies shall give preference to schools and nonprofit organizations, including community-based educational organizations, in the transfer, through gift or donation, of educationally useful Federal equipment.

3) Assisting Teachers’ Professional Development: Connecting Classrooms

Each agency that has employees who have computer expertise shall, to the extent permitted by law and in accordance with the guidelines of the Office of Personnel Management, encourage those employees to:

(A) help connect America’s classrooms to the National Information Infrastructure
(B) assist teachers in learning to use computers to teach
(C) provide ongoing maintenance of and technical support for the educationally useful Federal equipment transferred pursuant to this order.

== See also ==
- Bayh–Dole Act of 1980 (P.L. 96-517)
- Federal Technology Transfer Act of 1986
- Stevenson-Wydler Technology Innovation Act of 1980
