= Institute of Consulting =

United Kingdom professional body

The Institute of Consulting (IC) is the professional body for consultants and business advisers in the United Kingdom. It replaced the former Institute of Business Consulting (IBC) in January 2011, which was itself formed as the merger of two predecessor bodies, the Institute of Management Consultants (IMC) and the Institute of Business Advisors (IBA). The Institute of Consulting is an organisation within the Chartered Management Institute (CMI).

The IC offers several grades of membership, qualifications, training and awards as well as a range of tools and resource to support members. The institute also operates an accreditation process for its members.

== History ==
During a conference held in Paris during the 1950s, the Big Four consultancy companies at that time agreed to form the Management Consultancies Association. This was developed further into a professional institute and the Institute of Management Consultants came into being in 1962. Having changed its name during the 1990s to the Institute of Management Consultancy to enable corporate membership, the organisation began discussions about merging with the CMI in 2005. This led to the IMC becoming an organisation within the CMI later that year, but the two institutes remained as separate entities.

At the time of the merger with CMI, the IMC were themselves approached by the Institute of Business Advisors (IBA) about combining membership. After lengthy discussions, the IMC and IBA merged in 2007 to become the Institute of Business Consulting, an amalgamation of their two previous names.

Both the IBC and CMI suffered as a result of the 2008 financial crisis and the Great Recession. In 2010, the organisations established closer working links and relationships and, following feedback from members and the changing scope of their work, removed the word 'business' from the name, becoming the Institute of Consulting.

== Membership ==
There are 4 grades of membership within the IC:

- Affiliate – For anyone starting out in the consultancy field with little or no experience, or for anyone who just has an interest in consultancy and wishes to keep up to date with the profession. There is a sub-grade for those studying, Studying Affiliate, for individuals who are enrolled on an IC qualification course or are undertaking study outside of the IC, offering the Affiliate membership grade at a discount rate.
- Associate (AIC) – For individuals who have a small amount of experience in the consultancy or advisory fields. This grade offers resources for Continuous Personal Development free to members. Associates are entitled to use the postnominals AIC after their name to indicate their membership.
- Member (MIC) – The most popular grade, for individuals who have at least three years experience as a consultant or business adviser. Members are entitled to use postnominals MIC after their name to indicate their accreditation and membership.
- Fellow (FIC) – The highest grade of membership available, requiring at least 10 years experience, of which three must be at a strategic level. Fellow membership of the IC provides additional benefits including the possibility of becoming a mentor. Fellows are entitled to use the postnominals FIC after their name to indicate their status within the institute.

== Qualifications and training ==
The Institute of Consulting has several qualifications available for members, and offers courses to members and non-members. It offers several certifications and diplomas:

- Consultancy
  - Chartered Management Consultant (ChMC)
  - Certified Management Consultant
  - Certificate in Management Consulting Essentials
  - Diploma in Management Consulting
- Business Advisory
  - Certificate in Business Support
  - Diploma in Business Support
  - Certified Business Adviser

== See also ==
- Chartered Management Institute
- Outline of consulting
