= Frank Smizik =

Member of the Massachusetts House of Representatives

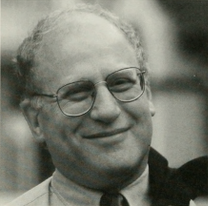
- Portrait of Frank Smizik

Member of the Massachusetts House of Representatives from the 15th Norfolk District
- In office January 3, 2001 – January 2, 2019
- Preceded by: Ronny Sydney
- Succeeded by: Tommy Vitolo

Personal details
- Born: September 4, 1944 (age 82) Pittsburgh, Pennsylvania
- Party: Democratic
- Education: University of Pittsburgh, B.A, 1966; Duquesne University School of Law, J.D., 1971
- Occupation: Attorney; Politician

Frank Israel Smizik (born September 4, 1944 in Pittsburgh) is an American attorney and politician who represented the 15th Norfolk District in the Massachusetts House of Representatives January 2001 until January 2, 2019.

Prior to being elected to the House, Smizik was a member of the Brookline, Massachusetts School Committee from 1992 to 2000 and was a member of the Brookline Housing Authority from 1982 to 1992.

Smizik ran unopposed for his Massachusetts legislative seat until 2014, when he defeated Republican challenger Curt Myers 80–20%.

For twenty-five years, Smizik worked as a legal services lawyer addressing housing and other civil issues facing low income persons.

In December 2017, Smizik announced he would not seek reelection at the end of his then current term. He retired in January 2019.
