= Growth–share matrix =

Boston Consulting Group business analysis method

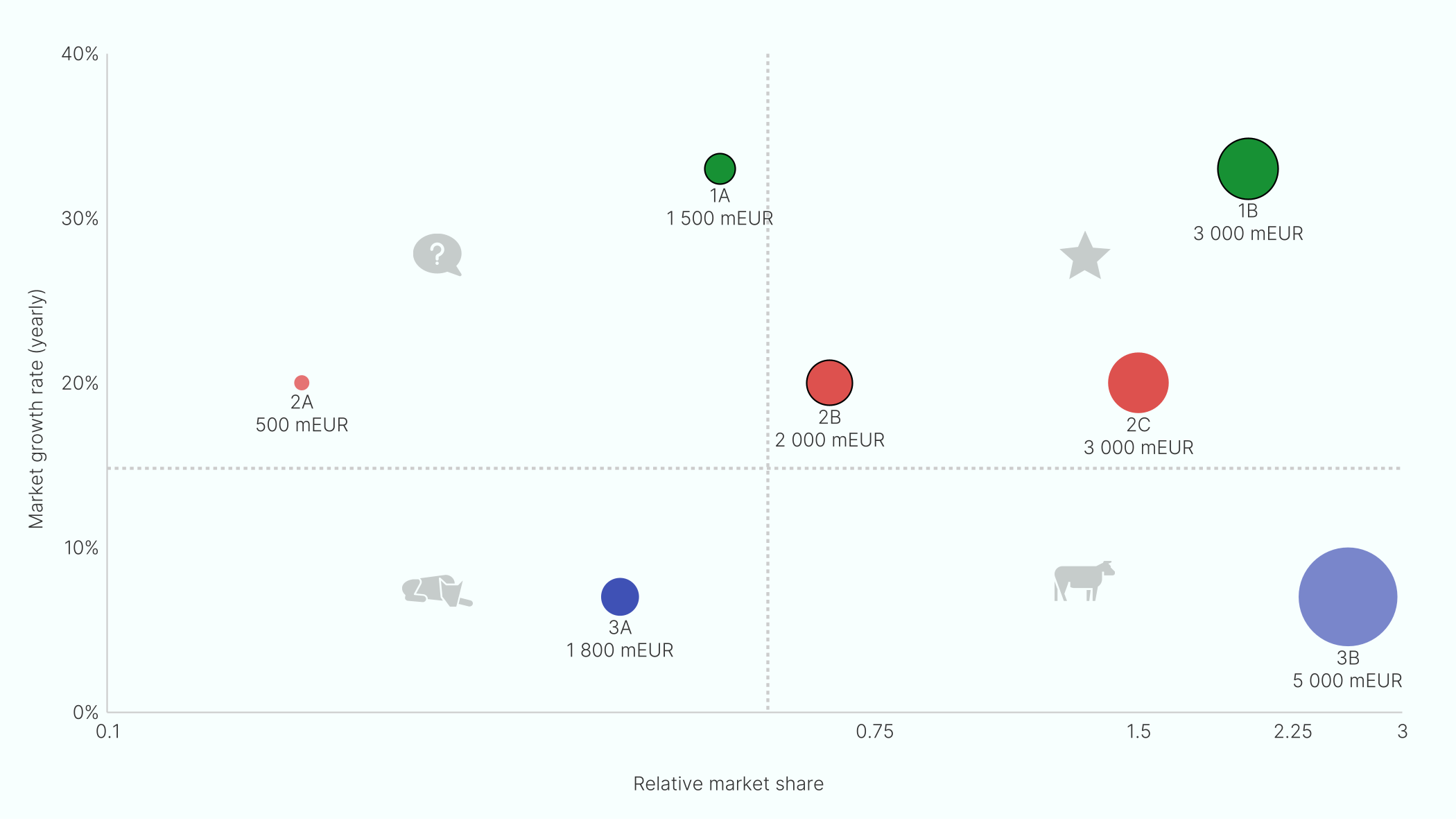
Stylised example of a BCG matrix. The products with the same color belong to the same market. The products with a black outline indicate the products that belong to the own company. The chart was created with the online tool Fancy BCG Matrix.

The growth–share matrix (also known as the product portfolio matrix, Boston Box, BCG-matrix, Boston matrix, Boston Consulting Group portfolio analysis and portfolio diagram) is a matrix used to help corporations to analyze their business units, that is, their product lines.

The matrix was initially created in a collaborative effort by Boston Consulting Group (BCG) employees. Alan Zakon first sketched it and then, together with his colleagues, refined it. BCG's founder Bruce D. Henderson popularized the concept in an essay titled "The Product Portfolio" in BCG's publication Perspectives in 1970. The matrix helps a company to allocate resources and is used as an analytical tool in brand marketing, product management, strategic management, and portfolio analysis.

== Overview ==
To use the matrix, analysts plot a scatter graph to rank the business units (or products) on the basis of their relative market shares and growth rates. This results is a chart showing:

- Cash cows, where a company has high market share in a slow-growing industry. These units typically generate cash in excess of the amount of cash needed to maintain the business. They are regarded as staid and boring, in a "mature" market, yet corporations value owning them due to their cash-generating qualities. They are to be "milked" continuously with as little investment as possible, since such investment would be wasted in an industry with low growth. Cash "milked" is used to fund stars and question marks, that are expected to become cash cows some time in the future.
- Dogs, also called pets: units with low market share in a mature, slow-growing industry: the BCG matrix defines dogs as having low market share and relatively low market growth rate. These units typically "break even", generating barely enough cash to maintain the business's market share. Although owning a break-even unit provides the social benefit of providing jobs and possible synergies that assist other business units, from an accounting point of view such a unit is worthless, not generating cash for the company. Dogs depress a profitable company's return on assets ratio, a measure used by many investors to judge how well a company is being managed. Dogs, it is thought, should be sold off once short-time harvesting has been maximized.
- Question marks (also known as a problem child or Wild dogs), which are business units operating with a low market share in a high-growth market. They are a starting point for most businesses. Question marks have a potential to gain market share and become stars, and eventually cash cows when market growth slows. If question marks do not succeed in becoming a market leader, then after perhaps years of cash consumption, they will degenerate into dogs when market growth declines. When shift from question mark to star is unlikely, the BCG matrix suggests divesting the question mark and repositioning its resources more effectively in the remainder of the corporate portfolio. Question marks must be analyzed carefully in order to determine whether they are worth the investment required to grow market share.
- Stars: units with a high market share in a fast-growing industry. They are graduated question marks with a market- or niche-leading trajectory, for example: among market share front-runners in a high-growth sector, and/or having a monopolistic or increasingly dominant unique selling proposition with burgeoning/fortuitous proposition drive(s) from: novelty, fashion/promotion (e.g. newly prestigious celebrity-branded fragrances), customer loyalty (e.g. greenfield or military/gang enforcement backed, and/or innovative, grey-market/illicit retail of addictive drugs, for instance the British East India Company's, late-1700s opium-based Qianlong Emperor embargo-busting, Canton System), goodwill (e.g. monopsonies) and/or gearing (e.g. oligopolies, for instance Portland cement producers near boomtowns), etc.

The hope is that stars become next cash cows. Stars require high funding to fight competitors and maintain their growth rate. When industry growth slows, if they remain a niche leader or are among the market leaders, stars become cash cows; otherwise, they become dogs due to low relative market share. As a particular industry matures and its growth slows, all business units become either cash cows or dogs. The natural cycle for most business units is that they start as question marks, then turn into stars. Eventually, the market stops growing; thus, the business unit becomes a cash cow. At the end of the cycle, the cash cow turns into a dog.

As BCG stated in 1970:

Only a diversified company with a balanced portfolio can use its strengths to truly capitalize on its growth opportunities. The balanced portfolio has:

- stars whose high share and high growth assure the future;
- cash cows that supply funds for that future growth; and
- question marks to be converted into stars with the added funds.

== Practical use ==
To be successful, a company should have a portfolio of products with different growth rates and different market shares. The portfolio composition is a function of the balance between cash flows. High growth products require cash inputs to grow. Low growth products should generate excess cash. Both kinds are needed simultaneously.

— Bruce Henderson

For each product or service, the 'area' of the circle represents the value of its sales. The growth–share matrix thus offers a "map" of the organization's product (or service) strengths and weaknesses, at least in terms of current profitability, as well as the likely cashflows. Common spreadsheet applications can be used to generate the matrix. In addition, designated online tools are available.

The need which prompted this idea was, indeed, that of managing cash-flow. It was reasoned that one of the main indicators of cash generation was relative market share, and one which pointed to cash usage was that of market growth rate.

=== Relative market share ===
This indicates likely cash generation, because the higher the share the more cash will be generated. As a result of 'economies of scale' (a basic assumption of the BCG Matrix), it is assumed that these earnings will grow faster the higher the share. The exact measure is the brand's share relative to its largest competitor. Thus, if the brand had a share of 20 percent, and the largest competitor had the same, the ratio would be 1:1. If the largest competitor had a share of 60 percent, however, the ratio would be 1:3, implying that the organization's brand was in a relatively weak position. If the largest competitor only had a share of 5 percent, the ratio would be 4:1, implying that the brand owned was in a relatively strong position, which might be reflected in profits and cash flows. If this technique is used in practice, this scale is logarithmic, not linear.

On the other hand, exactly what is a high relative share is a matter of some debate. The best evidence is that the most stable position (at least in fast-moving consumer goods markets) is for the brand leader to have a share double that of the second brand, and triple that of the third. Brand leaders in this position tend to be very stable—and profitable; the Rule of 123.

The selection of the relative market share metric was based upon its relationship to the experience curve. The market leader would have greater experience curve benefits, which delivers a cost leadership advantage.

Another reason for choosing relative market share, rather than just profits, is that it carries more information than just cash flow. It shows where the brand is positioned against its main competitors, and indicates where it might be likely to go in the future. It can also show what type of marketing activities might be expected to be effective.

=== Market growth rate ===
Rapidly growing in rapidly growing markets, are what organizations strive for; but, as we have seen, the penalty is that they are usually net cash users – they require investment. The reason for this is often because the growth is being 'bought' by the high investment, in the reasonable expectation that a high market share will eventually turn into a sound investment in future profits. The theory behind the matrix assumes, therefore, that a higher growth rate is indicative of accompanying demands on investment. The cut-off point is usually chosen as 10 per cent per annum. Determining this cut-off point, the rate above which the growth is deemed to be significant (and likely to lead to extra demands on cash) is a critical requirement of the technique; and one that, again, makes the use of the growth–share matrix problematical in some product areas. What is more, the evidence, from fast-moving consumer goods markets at least, is that the most typical pattern is of very low growth, less than 1 per cent per annum. This is outside the range normally considered in BCG Matrix work, which may make application of this form of analysis unworkable in many markets. Where it can be applied, however, the market growth rate says more about the brand position than just its cash flow. It is a good indicator of that market's strength, of its future potential (of its 'maturity' in terms of the market life-cycle), and also of its attractiveness to future competitors. It can also be used in growth analysis.

== Critical evaluation ==
While theoretically useful, and widely used, several academic studies have called into question whether using the growth–share matrix actually helps businesses succeed, and the model has since been removed from some major marketing textbooks. One study (Slater and Zwirlein, 1992), which looked at 129 firms, found that those who follow portfolio planning models like the BCG matrix had lower shareholder returns.

=== Misuse ===
As originally practiced by the Boston Consulting Group, the matrix was used in situations where it could be applied for graphically illustrating a portfolio composition as a function of the balance between cash flows. If used with this degree of sophistication its use would still be valid. However, later practitioners have tended to over-simplify its messages. In particular, the later application of the names (problem children, stars, cash cows and dogs) has tended to overshadow all else—and is often what most students, and practitioners, remember.

Such simplistic use contains at least two major problems:

- Minority applicability. The cashflow techniques are only applicable to a very limited number of markets (where growth is relatively high, and a definite pattern of product life-cycles can be observed, such as that of ethical pharmaceuticals). In the majority of markets, use may give misleading results.
- 'Milking cash cows'. Perhaps the worst implication of the later developments is that the (brand leader) cash cows should be milked to fund new brands. This is not what research into the fast-moving consumer goods markets has shown to be the case. The brand leader's position is the one, above all, to be defended, not least since brands in this position will probably outperform any number of newly launched brands. Such brand leaders will, of course, generate large cash flows; but they should not be 'milked' to such an extent that their position is jeopardized. In any case, the chance of the new brands achieving similar brand leadership may be slim—certainly far less than the popular perception of the Boston Matrix would imply.

Perhaps the most important danger, however, is that the apparent implication of its four-quadrant form is that there should be balance of products or services across all four quadrants; and that is, indeed, the main message that it is intended to convey. Thus, money must be diverted from 'cash cows' to fund the 'stars' of the future, since 'cash cows' will inevitably decline to become 'dogs'. There is an almost mesmeric inevitability about the whole process. It focuses attention, and funding, on to the 'stars'. It presumes, and almost demands, that 'cash cows' will turn into 'dogs'.

The reality is that it is only the 'cash cows' that are really important—all the other elements are supporting actors. It is a poorly advised vendor who diverts funds from a 'cash cow' when these are needed to extend the life of that 'product'. Although it is necessary to recognize a 'dog' when it appears (at least before it bites you), it would be highly inadvisable in the extreme to create one in order to balance up the picture. The vendor, who has most of their products in the 'cash cow' quadrant, should consider themselves fortunate indeed, and an excellent marketer, although they might also consider creating a few stars as an insurance policy against unexpected future developments and, perhaps, to add some extra growth. There is also a common misconception that 'dogs' are a waste of resources. In many markets, 'dogs' can be considered loss-leaders that, while not themselves profitable, will lead to increased sales in other profitable areas.

=== Alternatives ===
As with most marketing techniques, there are a number of alternative offerings vying with the growth–share matrix although this appears to be the most widely used. The next most widely reported technique is that developed by McKinsey and General Electric, which is a three-cell by three-cell matrix—using the dimensions of 'industry attractiveness' and 'business strengths'. This approaches some of the same issues as the growth–share matrix but from a different direction and in a more complex way (which may be why it is used less, or is at least less widely taught). Both the growth-share matrix and the Industry Attractiveness-Business Strength matrix developed by McKinsey and General Electric, are criticized for being static as they portray businesses as they exist at one point in time. The business environment is subject to constant changes; hence, businesses evolve over time. The Life Cycle-Competitive Strength Matrix was introduced to overcome these deficiences and better identify "developing winners" or potential "losers". A more practical approach is that of the Boston Consulting Group's Advantage Matrix, which the consultancy reportedly used itself though it is little known among the wider population.

== Other uses ==
The initial intent of the growth–share matrix was to evaluate business units, but the same evaluation can be made for product lines or any other cash-generating entities. This should only be attempted for real lines that have a sufficient history to allow some prediction; if the corporation has made only a few products and called them a product line, the sample variance will be too high for this sort of analysis to be meaningful.
