= Cruzer Enterprise =

Encrypted USB flash drive

The SanDisk Cruzer Enterprise was an encrypted USB flash drive. This secure USB drive imposed a mandatory access control on all files, storing them in a hardware-encrypted, password-protected partition. The Cruzer Enterprise was designed to protect information on company-issued USB flash drives.

Central Management and Control (CMC) server software centrally managed the drive, enabling password administration, data backup, and termination if the drive is lost or stolen. It was released around 2008. The Cruzer Enterprise supported Microsoft Windows 2000 SP4, Windows XP SP1, Windows Server 2003, Windows Vista, and Apple OS X 10.4 and 10.5. It was discontinued in November 2010.

The SanDisk Cruzer Enterprise competed with other secure USB drives, including IronKey, Kingston, and Verbatim, and also disk encryption software such as FreeOTFE and TrueCrypt.

Cruzer Enterprise FIPS Edition also offered features of the Cruzer Enterprise, including:

- Mandatory password-protection and hardware-based 256-bit AES encryption for all files stored on the drive.
- Encryption keys never leave the drive, so they are safe from hacking attempts aimed at the host PC.
- Plug & Play functionality on any PC
- Premium performance, with read speed of 24 megabytes (MB) per second and write speed of 20 MB/sec1.
- Complete lifecycle management through SanDisk's CMC (Central Management & Control) server software. CMC provides password recovery and renewal through the network, remote termination of lost drives, central back-up and restore, and central usage tracking. This means data is not lost when a drive is lost, and IT administrators can provision a replacement flash drive with user files stored on the network.

== See also ==
- Comparison of disk encryption software
