= Law of the Northern Mariana Islands =

The law of the Northern Mariana Islands includes:

- The Covenant to Establish a Commonwealth of the Northern Mariana Islands in Political Union with the United States of America, which specifies which political issues require agreement between the United States and the CNMI, and which can unilaterally be decided by the federal government.
- The 1976 Constitution of the Northern Mariana Islands, as amended.
- Laws passed by the territorial legislature, codified in the Commonwealth Code, abbreviated "CMC" in legal citations.
- Regulations in the Administrative Code Regulation proposals and adopted changes are published in the Commonwealth Register, abbreviated "Com. Reg." in legal citations.
- Local laws passed by the municipalities of Saipan, Tinian, and Rota. (Northern Islands Municipality is uninhabited.)
- Case law generated by the territorial courts, as a common law jurisdiction

As a territory of the United States, United States federal law applies to the CNMI, though many laws that apply to the 50 states do not cover the Commonwealth. Unlike states, the U.S. federal government has direct control over territories, limited only by the Covenant. As an unincorporated territory, not all of the provisions of the United States Constitution apply.

Cases under federal law are heard before the District Court for the Northern Mariana Islands. Unlike federal Article III courts in the 50 states, the District of Columbia, and Puerto Rico, this is a United States territorial court established under Congress's territorial power under Article VI of the United States Constitution, so judges do not have lifetime appointments. Cases under territorial law are heard by the Superior Court of the Commonwealth of the Northern Mariana Islands, with appeals heard by the Supreme Court of the Commonwealth of the Northern Mariana Islands.

== See also ==
- Gun laws in the Northern Mariana Islands
- Northern Mariana Islands
