= Roland Geyer =

Roland Geyer is professor of industrial ecology at the Bren School of Environmental Science and Management, University of California at Santa Barbara. He is a specialist in the ecological impact of plastics. Geyer has his MS in Physics from Technische Universität Berlin, Germany, and his PhD in Engineering from University of Surrey, UK.

Before Geyer was at UC Santa Barbara, he was at the Centre for Environmental Strategy for the University of Surrey, UK. He has also been a financial risk consultant for AMS, now CGI in Germany. In 2013 Geyer spoke at an Enfinite conference, speaking on work he had done about California's resource recycling program regarding industrial oil and lubrication oil, conducting life cycle assessments. His presentation focused on this process and how his team learned from this experience in addition to the results of the study.

Currently Geyer works on studying the viability and technical feasibility of pollution prevention, and to reduce the pollution from industrial processes. Some courses he has taught at UC Santa Barbara include ESM 273 Life Cycle Assessment, ESM 282 Pollution Prevention, and ESM 288 Energy, Technology and the Environment. In 2020 Geyer was second author on, "Pathways to reduce global plastic waste mismanagement and greenhouse gas emissions by 2050," which used machine learning to predict how plastic production and pollution will change.

In March 2021, Geyer wrote in The Guardian that humanity should ban fossil fuels, just at it had earlier banned tetraethyllead (TEL) and chlorofluorocarbons (CFC).
