= Strategic grid model =

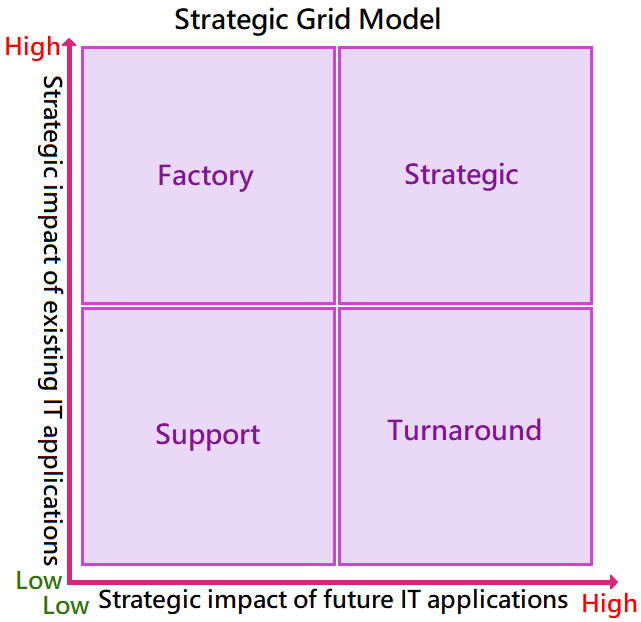
Strategic grid model

The strategic grid model is a contingency approach that can be used to determine the strategic relevance of IT to an organization. The model was proposed by F. Warren McFarlan and James L. McKenney in 1983, and takes the impact of the information technology on the strategy in future planning as the horizontal axis, and the current impact of the information technology on corporate strategy as the vertical axis, which is divided into four types: support, turnaround, factory, and strategic.

== Overview ==
Strategic grid model has four quadrants built around two straightforward questions:

- How important the management feels the current IT systems are to the company.
- How important the company thinks future developments in IT will be, ie the impact of future IT developments on its way of doing business.

Depending on the responses to these questions, a company can be placed in the four quadrants as follows:

Type	Comprise	Narrative
Support	Low existing, low future impact	IT has little relevance and simply supports existing processes
Turnaround	Low existing, high future impact	IT feature more on the business agenda in the future. IT will be a key feature of future strategic planning, it may not have played such a role in the past.
Factory	High existing, low future impact	It is important in terms of day-to-day operations but it is not felt that there are any major IT developments on the horizon that will fundamentally alter the nature of the business. Here, the key issue is the maintenance of existing systems.
Strategic	High existing, high future impact	In this quadrant, how organizations view the current role of IT and the future development of IT will both have an impact

== Analysis ==
In order to assess the strategic impact of IT, McFarlan proposed the analysis of five basic questions about IT applications, related to the competitive forces:

- If IT applications can build barriers to the entry of new competitors in the industry
- If IT applications can build switching costs for suppliers
  - If IT applications can change the basis of competition
  - If IT applications can change the balance of power in supplier relationships
  - If IT applications can create new products

Nevertheless, these questions should take into account current and future planned circumstances. Thus, IT may present a smaller or greater importance, according to the kind of company and industry operations.
