= Energy consulting =

Energy consulting is a sub-discipline of environmental consulting that focuses on optimizing a business' energy usage, and provides assistance to the state institutions to adjust its policies according to the anticipations presented. This usually imply not only quantitive changes in the consumption but also diversification towards more ecological sources. Energy consulting is often centered on reducing operational costs, though this is not always the main goal. With the increasing importance of corporate social responsibility (CSR) in the minds of the general public, enterprise level businesses may contract an energy consultant to include more environmentally friendly energy sources into their energy mix.

With the recent volatility in the energy industry, energy consulting is quickly becoming a main component of business operations for enterprises worldwide.

== Role of hedging and financial analysis ==
As a result of the volatility in the modern energy industry, many enterprise level businesses are turning to financial analysts, specifically through the use of derivatives and hedging to minimize exposure to the unstable energy industry.

== See also ==
- Energy broker
- Consulting firm
