= Boston Consulting Group's Advantage Matrix =

BCG's Advantage matrix from "Strategy in the 1980s"

Boston Consulting Group's Advantage Matrix is a matrix developed by Boston Consulting Group which approached the economies of scale decision rather more directly following its growth-share matrix. This is known as their Advantage Matrix.

== Creation ==
The matrix was created by Boston Consulting Group and published in a 1981 Perspective titled "Strategy in the 1980s" by Richard Lochridge. It was created as a follow up to the growth-share matrix.

== Overview ==
Similar to the growth-share matrix, the Advantage Matrix groups businesses into four categories. These are volume, stalemated, specialized and fragmented businesses. However, this matrix takes as its axes the two contrasting alternatives, economies of scale (described by them as 'potential size of advantage') against differentiation (shown as 'number of approaches to achieving advantage'). In essence, the former category covers the approach described in the more popular growth-share matrix, while the latter represents the approach (described by Michael Porter) of differentiating products so that they do not compete head-on with their competitors. The Boston Consulting Group described the size of advantage as a company's ability to gain economies of scale.

- Volume business. In this case there are considerable economies of scale, but few opportunities for differentiation. This is the classic situation in which organizations strive for economies of scale by becoming the volume, and hence, cost leader. Examples are volume cars and consumer electronics.
- Stalemated business. Here there is neither the opportunity for differentiation nor economies of scale; examples are textiles and shipbuilding. The main means of competition, therefore, has been reducing the `factor costs' (mainly those of labor) by moving to locations where these costs are lower, even to different countries in the developing world.
- Specialized business. These businesses gain benefits from both economies of scale and differentiation (often characterized by experience effects in their own, differentiated, segment); examples being branded foods and cosmetics. The main strategies are focus and segment leadership.
- Fragmented business. These organizations also gain benefit from differentiation, particularly in the services sector, but little from economies of scale; examples being restaurants and job-shop engineering. Competition may be minimized by innovatory differentiation.

== References and Sources ==
Notes

Sources

- M. E. Porter, 'Competitive Strategy' (Free Press, 1980)
