= Ethics in business communication =

Considerations when doing business communications

Ethical issues in business communications are the ethical considerations in business communication that allow communication to be successful for both the sender and the receiver. From end-to-end effective communicators try as clearly and accurately to pass on their ideas, intentions and, objectives to their receiver in a clear, transparent and truthful way.

In the business world, effective communication skills are necessary due to the highly informational and technological era, which has made it easier for exchanging of information between the parties using non face-to-face methods.

== Overview ==
Some of the vital characteristics of ethical communication are discussed below.

=== Making a point without offense ===
While communicating with the audience and expressing the desired message in a significant manner is of primary importance. Strong conversation skills can make a big difference in the workplace. Knowing how to share an attentive, friendly discussion will give more confidence and help build better relationships. Key skills, include more thoughtful listener, giving sharper responses, and handling common mistakes. For instance, the employees in a company can be asked to increase their efficiency in a demanding manner whereas managers and executives will feel offended if the same tone is used on them. There are different ways to explain the exact things to them in a much smoother manner.

=== Building rapport ===
Building rapport and trust with an audience is a key component of business communication. Effective communicators build a relationship by asking follow-up questions when audience members contribute, allowing them further opportunity to express their views. Seeking post-presentation feedback used to assess audience sentiment and engagement.

Avoid withholding crucial information, information is vital for all decision. Hence, it is essential for any organization to be cautious when communicating with titanic. The related information should be absolute, and all crucial information must be passed on appropriately. Purposely withholding crucial information might result in the public conceiving a bad image.

=== Clear organizational values ===
In order to ensure that this concept is successfully practiced and understood in an organization, a well-organized value system must be established throughout the organization by the top management. If an organization functions on the base of value systems common to both the top management and the employees, mutual respect between them will be present. A sound and healthy value system can make way for ethical communication.
