= Cultural Ministers Council =

Cultural Ministers Council was an Australia intergovernmental organisation for ministers of culture and the arts.

== History ==
It was established in 1984 by the Prime Minister of Australia, Premiers of the Australian states and the Chief Minister of the Northern Territory. The Australian Capital Territory became a full member in 1990 as a consequence of being granted full self-governance with the passing of Australian Capital Territory (Self-Government) Act 1988. New Zealand became a full member in 1991 after previously having observer status. Australian Local Government Association, Norfolk Island and Papua New Guinea had observer status. The council operated under the Broad Protocols and General Principles for the Operation of Ministerial Councils defined by the Council of Australian Governments.

The Cultural Ministers Council has not met since 2011:

On 13 February 2011, the Council of Australian Governments (COAG) agreed to comprehensive reform of the Ministerial Council system. COAG agreed to create a number of councils and governance fora but the Cultural Ministers Council was not identified to transition to this new structure and its remit was withdrawn on 30 June 2011.

== Sources ==
Australia Council (27 November 1985). "Australia Council - Report and financial statements, together with Auditor-General's Report - Year - 1984-85". Parliament of Australia.

Australian Museums OnLine. "Cultural Ministers Council". Australian Museums OnLIne. Archived from the original on 7 May 1999.

Conran, Peter (October 2020). "Review of COAG Councils and Ministerial Forums: Report to National Cabinet" (PDF). Department of the Prime Minister and Cabinet. p. 12.

Cultural Ministers Council (28 November 2008). "About us". Cultural Ministers Council. Archived from the original on 1 June 2011.

"Meeting of Cultural Ministers - Communiqué - 12 August 2011" (PDF). Cultural Ministers Council. 12 August 2011. Archived from the original (PDF) on 25 March 2012.
