= European Federation of Management Consultancies Associations (FEACO) =

The European Federation of Management Consultancies Associations, often abbreviated as FEACO, is a not-for-profit organisation that brings together European associations of management consultancies under one umbrella organisation. FEACO was founded in 1960 and currently has 18 members, representing consultancy firms of all sizes across Europe. Since March 2024, the president of FEACO has been Alfred Harl from Austria (UBIT Professional Association for Management Consultancy, Accounting and IT within the Austrian Economic Chamber).

Rooted in the FEACO is the Independent Management Consultancies Network (IMCN). It was founded in 1994 and pursues the goal to establish a competitive network of qualified management consultancies. The IMCN Members commit to follow the FEACO guidelines and comply with the Code of Conduct. Today, IMCN represents over 200 management consultants from more than 10 countries in Europe with global assignments and experience.

== Mission ==
FEACO’s stated mission is to raise the profile of the consultancy sector in Europe and to enhance the sector’s image. All FEACO members undertake to comply with the association’s Code of Conduct, which sets out rules governing professional standards for consultants. The Code of Conduct sets out rules of conduct relating to qualifications, ethics, confidentiality, transparency and fees. Furthermore, members’ consultancy firms must demonstrate that they have a quality management system in place.

== Members ==
- Austria – UBIT
- Denmark – Dansk Industri
- Estonia – Estonian Consultants Association
- Finland – LJK
- France – Syntec Conseil
- Germany – BDU
- Greece – Sesma
- Hungary – VTMSZ
- Italy – Assoconsult
- Kosovo – Business Consultants Council
- Norway – Virke Consulting Norway
- Portugal – APPC
- Romania – AMCOR
- Slovenia – AMCOS
- Spain – AEC
- Switzerland – Association of Management Consultants Switzerland (ASCO)
- Ukraine – CMC Ukraine
- United Kingdom – MCA

== Weblinks ==
- "About feaco - FEACO European Federation of Management Consultancies Associations". www.feaco.org.
- "Independent Management Consultancies Network IMCN". imcn.eu.
