= Sustainability consultant =

A sustainability consultant is someone who advises businesses on methods to deliver their products or services in a sustainable manner (usually in an ecological sense). This field forms part of corporate social responsibility (CSR), and includes focal areas like "green building, renewable energy, waste management and sustainable development."

== Organisational culture and behaviour change ==
Research on the role of sustainability consultants in the UK found that there is a tendency to focus on technical aspects of building energy efficiency, facilities management and renewable technologies, but that consultants were aware of the need to support businesses on the ‘softer’ aspects of sustainability such as organisational culture and values.

Behavioural change initiatives can be effective in reducing emissions, and have multiple benefits including boosting staff morale, while research has found that collaboration between businesses can improve environmental performance.

Online tools are available to support sustainability consultants to broaden their skills.

== Industry associations ==
- Accounting for Sustainability (A4S)
- American Sustainable Business Council (ASBC)
- Chartered Institution of Building Services Engineers
- Institute of Environmental Management and Assessment
- The Association for the Advancement of Sustainability in Higher Education
- The Climate Disclosure Standards Board (CDSB)
- International Society for Sustainability Professionals (ISSP)
- The Sustainability Consortium

Certifications associated with sustainability standards include the Zero-energy building (ZEB), Leadership in Energy and Environmental Design (LEED), WELL Building Standard, and Passive Building Design.

== See also ==
- Environmental consulting
- Green accounting
- Sustainable development
- Environmental engineer
- Eco-capitalism
