= Environmental consulting =

Form of compliance consulting

Environmental consulting is often a form of compliance consulting, in which the consultant ensures that the client maintains an appropriate measure of compliance with environmental regulations. Sustainable consulting is a specialized field that offers guidance and solutions for businesses seeking to operate in an environmentally responsible and sustainable way. The goal of sustainable consulting is to help organizations reduce their environmental impact while maintaining profitability and social responsibility. There are many types of environmental consultants, but the two main groups are those who enter the field from the industry side, and those who enter the field from the environmentalist side.

Environmental consultants work in a wide variety of fields. Whether it be providing construction services such as asbestos hazard assessments, lead hazard assessments or conducting due diligence reports. Consultancies may generalize across a range of disciplines or specialize in certain areas of environmental consultancy such as waste management.

Environmental consultants usually have an undergraduate degree and sometimes even master's degree in Environmental Engineering, Environmental Science, Environmental Studies, Geology, or some other science discipline. They should have deep knowledge on environmental regulations, which they can advise particular clients in the private industry or public government institutions to help them steer clear of possible fines, legal action or misguided transactions.

Environmental consulting spans a wide spectrum of industry. The most basic industry that environmental consulting remains prominent in is the commercial estate market. Many commercial lenders rely on both small and large environmental firms. Many commercial lenders will not lend monies to borrowers if the property or personal capital does not exceed the worth of the land. If an environmental problem is discovered property owners that deem themselves a responsible party will most likely reserve monies in escrow in order to resolve the environmental impact.

With increasing numbers of construction, agriculture, and scientific companies employing environmental consultancies, the industry can expect growth in the vicinity of 6 percent from 2025 to 2035, amidst mounting public concern over environmental degradation and climate change. And while some companies are genuinely motivated by concern for the environment, for others, hiring consultants to appear to be "going green" has proven to be a useful marketing tool. Growing government funding into renewable energy and technologies producing low emissions is also helping growth, as organizations investing in research and development in these areas are often major employers of environmental consultants.

== Subdisciplines ==
There are numerous areas in which environmental consultants might work:

- Contaminated land — assessments such as a phase 1 environmental site assessment
- Energy — feasibility studies and analysis for renewable energy projects. For example, a study may attempt to answer the question: Would a micro-hydro-generation scheme pay for itself over the course of its operational life?
- Geotechnical — activities such as site investigations, geotechnical engineering (foundation design, slope stability), and restoration quality assurance.
- Environmental management systems (EMS) — large complicated systems that are often not implemented using internal man/woman power. Standards such as ISO 14001 define criteria for an EMS and provide assurance to company management, employees as well as external stakeholders that environmental impact is being measured and improved and there is compliance with any applicable legislation. Such work is usually outsourced to consultants.
- Green claims — environmental consultants may be employed to substantiate green claims, such as eco labels, which may involve work on supply chain or embodied carbon.
- Compliance — as governments become more and more environmental in their thinking, so do their legal frameworks. In the UK, businesses are covered by numerous pieces of legislation such as oil storage regulations and the Environment Act 1995. If they are found to be in breach of these regulations, they may face severe civil or criminal actions depending on the extent of the breach. Environmental consultants can perform compliance checks to determine if the business in question is compliant with the current regulations.
- Impact assessment — see environmental impact statement
- Flood risk
- Asbestos management
- Radon
- Carbon — there are various aspects of a company's carbon foot print that may be managed by consultants. They may have internal reduction strategies, or they may be tied in with national targets. Emissions trading is also an important aspect of carbon management.

== See also ==
- Green accounting
- Sustainable Development
- Environmental engineer
- Eco-capitalism
- Sustainability consultant
