= Research and development agreement =

A research and development (R&D) Agreement is an agreement, usually a contract, between two entities to conduct research and development. "Research and Development Agreement is a systematic activity combining both basic and applied research, and aimed at discovering solutions to problems or creating new goods and knowledge."

Most research and development agreements can be divided into two types:

Firstly, an agreement for one party to perform research and development for another (called the "principal"). This type of agreement is essentially a form of subcontracting for research services, since there is a hierarchy between the parties involved.
Then there is "Joint R&D", an agreement on cooperation between the parties on research and development at an equal level. It belongs to the group called horizontal agreements and has a specific EU/EEA legislation on it.

== EU R&D and competition rules ==
The joint R&D agreement may be subject to the competition rules. The European Commission and other EU/EEA institutions are encouraging R&D by making exceptions to the strict competition rules in a Regulation on a block exemption. The Regulation contains the information what should be avoided and provides a blacklist of provisions. The Regulation may not necessarily cover the entire agreement (e.g. price fixing, market sharing and limitation of production and others), due to the some restrictions on competition.

However, the prohibition of the competition restrictions does not apply to the SMEs or to the firms having a low market share. It is easier for them to draft the R&D agreements, since the turnover and market share of these companies can be so low that their agreements often are not capable of having an appreciable effect (which is a condition for the application of the European competition rules) on the trade between Member States.

The following restrictions of competition are considered as strict ones when R&D agreement has an appreciable effect on the trade between Member States:

- Restriction of freedom to carry out R&D in other fields during and after the period of the agreement
- Restriction of freedom to carry out R&D in the same field after expiration of the agreements
- Prohibition from challenging the validity of intellectual property right
- Limitation of production or sales
- Price fixing related to sales to third parties
- Market sharing (geographical are of group of customers), with some exceptions

There must be in addition an appreciable restriction of competition for the rules to be applied. Otherwise, certain restrictions of competition may be permitted in accordance with the “de minimis“ Notice, subject to the fulfillment of the conditions in the Notice. The European Commission and the ESA give a definition of what is an appreciable restriction of competition in the Notice. The R&D agreements are horizontal agreements of minor importance. Due to this reason, they are not considered to appreciably restrict the competition when the parties' market share on the relevant market affected by the R&D agreement is under 15%. When the parties are actual or potential competitors, this rate is reduced to 10%. Nevertheless, there might be more strict national competition rules applied.

In the situation when manufacturer orders the R&D from another party in the exchange for payment, the ownership of the result is not covered by the Regulation on horizontal agreements, but instead by the Regulation on vertical Agreements.

== R&D, property rights, and right to exploit the results ==
The clauses on the ownership of secret know-how and intellectual property rights must be drafted very precisely by the parties of the R&D agreement. The results of the joint research and development, which might be extremely valuable, must be thoroughly discussed and drafted by the parties. The questions about the ownership (whether the results will be owned by some specific participants or all participant), terms of exploitation (free of charge, unlimited in time or not and so on) and other conditions should be decided by both parties. This part of the agreement is very important, since a lot of disputes arise and good cooperation might be lost due to the imperfections, omissions, and impressiveness in the clauses. It is advisable to the parties to consider all possible unclear situations and ensure clauses, especially on the following:

- Contribution by each party: inventions (description and origin)
- Contribution by each party: property rights (description and origin)
- Right to exploit the contributions, to what extent
- Results of the R&D (description)
- Right for the parties to exploit (use, produce and/or sell) the results
- Exploitation by third parties (permitted or not, conditions)
- Licensing possibilities
- Duty or prohibition to register the inventions and in whose name
