= Certified mortgage consultant =

In the United States a Certified Mortgage Consultant is the most advanced designation for mortgage professionals who are members of the National Association of Mortgage Brokers.

There are 3 levels of official NAMB Certification: Certified Mortgage Consultant or CMC, Certified Residential Mortgage Specialist or CRMS and General Mortgage Associate or GMA. NAMB certified mortgage professionals pledge to adhere to a strict code of ethics and best business practices, and they have proven their skill by meeting tough eligibility requirements and passing a rigorous exam. As the economy and the mortgage industry change, NAMB Certified mortgage professionals maintain their industry expertise by satisfying NAMB's continuing-education requirements.

- The CMC designation is NAMB's most advanced certification. It requires at least 5 years industry experience as well as superior knowledge of residential and commercial financing. Candidates must pass a background check as well as a 200 question exam.
- The CRMS designation requires at least 2 years industry experience and superior knowledge of residential financing.
- The GMA designation requires proven knowledge of residential financing.
