= Office of Research and Technology Applications =

The Office of Research and Technology Applications (ORTA) is an organizational structure established in United States federal laboratories through the Stevenson-Wydler Technology Innovation Act of 1980 (P.L. 96-480), specified in 15 USC § 3710. The acronym "ORTA" has evolved to refer to those who perform the functions of the ORTA organization. By law, the ORTA must be staffed by at least one full-time person in any laboratory with 200 or more scientific, engineering, or related technical positions, in order to coordinate and promote technology transfer.

== Functions ==
According to 15 USC § 3710, the ORTA's function is to:

- Prepare application assessments for selected research and development projects in which that laboratory is engaged and which in the opinion of the laboratory may have potential commercial applications;
- Provide and disseminate information on federally owned or originated products, processes, and services having potential application to State and local governments and to private industry;
- Cooperate with and assist the National Technical Information Service, the Federal Laboratory Consortium for Technology Transfer, and other organizations which link the research and development resources of that laboratory and the Federal Government as a whole to potential users in State and local government and private industry;
- Provide technical assistance to State and local government officials; and
- Participate, where feasible, in regional, State, and local programs designed to facilitate or stimulate the transfer of technology for the benefit of the region, State, or local jurisdiction in which the Federal laboratory is located.
