= Stevenson–Wydler Technology Innovation Act of 1980 =

- Long title: An Act to promote United States technological innovation for the achievement of national economic, environmental, and social goals, and for other purposes.
- Enacted by: the 96th United States Congress
- Effective: October 21, 1980

Citations
- Public law: Pub. L. 96–480
- Statutes at Large: 94 Stat. 2311

Codification
- Titles amended: 15 U.S.C.: Commerce and Trade
- U.S.C. sections created: 15 U.S.C. ch. 63
- U.S.C. sections amended: Chapter 63 § 3701

Legislative history
- Introduced in the Senate as S. 1250 by Adlai Stevenson III (D–IL) on May 24, 1979; Committee consideration by Senate Commerce, Science, and Transportation Subcommittee and House Science and Technology Committee; Passed the Senate on May 28, 1980 (passed); Passed the House on September 8, 1980 (passed) with amendment; Senate agreed to House amendment on September 26, 1980 (agreed) with further amendment; House agreed to Senate amendment on October 1, 1980 (agreed); Signed into law by President Jimmy Carter on October 21, 1980

The Stevenson–Wydler Technology Innovation Act of 1980 (Pub.L. 96–480) (94 Stat. 2311) was the first major U.S. technology transfer law. It required federal laboratories to actively participate in and budget for technology transfer activities.

The Stevenson–Wydler Technology Innovation Act was signed into law by U.S. President Jimmy Carter on October 21, 1980.

The Stevenson–Wydler Act specifies, that inventors at government laboratories receive the first $2,000 of royalties each year plus 15% of any additional royalties. Such details are in contrast with the Bayh–Dole Act, which leaves up to the universities the decision how to split the revenue between the inventors and the institution.

== Background ==
The Act made it easier for federal laboratories to transfer technology to nonfederal entities and provided outside organizations with a means for accessing federal laboratory technologies.

The primary focus of the Stevenson–Wydler Act was to disseminate information from the federal government to the public and to require federal laboratories to actively engage in the technology transfer process. The law requires laboratories to set apart a percentage of the laboratory budget specifically for technology transfer activities. The law, specified in 15 USC § 3710, also established an Office of Research and Technology Applications (ORTA)-- staffed by at least 1 full-time person—in any laboratory with 200 or more scientific, engineering, or related technical positions, in order to coordinate and promote technology transfer.

The Act created the Technology Administration in the Commerce Department. which lasted until 2007.

This Act was the first of a number of laws defining and promoting technology transfer. The law was later amended by the Federal Technology Transfer Act of 1986 and the America COMPETES Acts.

== See also ==
- Bayh–Dole Act of 1980 (P.L. 96-517)
- Executive Order 12999: Educational Technology
- Federal Technology Transfer Act of 1986
