= International Council of Management Consulting Institutes =

- Named CMC-Global since 2013
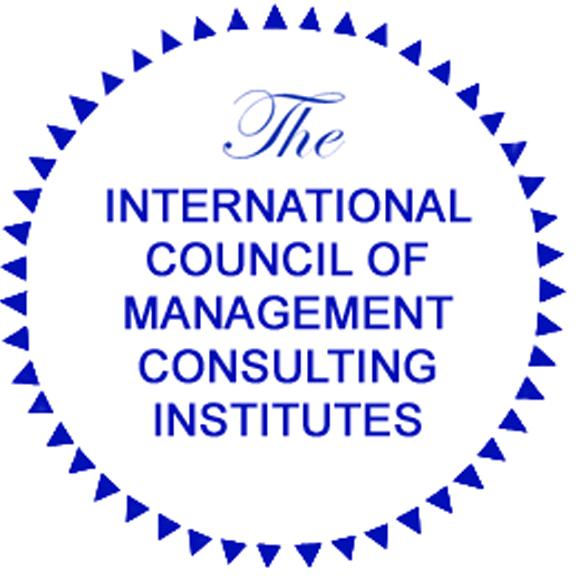
- Abbreviation: ICMCI
- Formation: 1987; 39 years ago
- Type: Professional association
- Legal status: Foundation (membership organisation)
- Professional title: Certified Management Consultant (CMC)
- Location: Zurich, Switzerland
- Region served: Worldwide
- Services: Consulting Services
- Fields: Management consulting
- Official language: English
- Key people: Robert Bodenstein, Austria (Chair); Jeremy Webster, United Kingdom (Secretary)
- Website: cmc-global.org

The International Council of Management Consulting Institutes (ICMCI), known as CMC-Global, is an international professional body for management consultants.

It exists to:

- Elevate the standards of the certified management consultant (CMC) worldwide
- Increase the acceptance and respect of the management consulting profession
- Increase the international and regional profile of management consulting
- Improve the process of certification throughout the world
- Provide a forum for national certifying bodies of certified management consultants
- Prepare and promulgate standards for management consulting to be adopted internationally
- Promote the ethical and moral practices of Certified Management Consultants and the management consulting profession
- Promote the higher performance and purpose of CMC's versus non certified "management consultants."

The practice of management consulting is about "helping organizations to improve their performance, operating primarily through the analysis of existing organizational problems and the development of plans for improvement — with the purpose of gaining external (and presumably objective) advice and access to the consultants' specialized expertise." It follows therefore that there is scope for an international organization to promote and foster competence in the management consulting profession.

== History ==
In May 1987, thirty-two management consultants from ten countries met to explore the common ground between professional institutes which were known to certify individual management consultants. At the end of the two-day meeting the delegates proposed the formation of an International Council of Management Consulting Institutes to improve the certification of management consultants around the world. IMCs of seven countries formed the founding members of the new Council.

In 1989 the Council organizational structure including membership requirements and application process were in place. Membership had grown to ten IMCs with four applications pending. The thirty delegates from eleven countries who attended this session ratified the structure and membership criteria, agreed to establish ICMCI as a Swiss Verein and approved the ICMCI Code of Professional Conduct. This ICMCI Code became the first and still may be the only international code of conduct of any profession.

In 1993 the ICMCI strategic plan was adopted by the members. The features of this plan included: international Standards, support and adherence by Member Institutes, increased international recognition with support (by international influencers and Member Institutes) for certification of competent management consultants to the CMC (Certified Management Consultant) a title originating from our Canadian Member who were delighted to enable ICMCI to use the title worldwide.

From 1999 to 2003 the standards for the competence qualification CMC were developed and agreed. A quality assurance programme was developed to ensure that all awarded the CMC were to an equivalent standard: the first business qualification to achieve this. The CMC is a benchmark of management consultancy competence, objectivity, independence, and professionalism.

In July 2001, ICMCI was granted Special Consultative Status by the United Nations' Economic and Social Council (ECOSOC). ICMCI since then has provided research based research papers in support of the UN, or its member bodies, objectives.

Since 2007, ICMCI has increased its working with international bodies and organisations including ISO (International Organization for Standardization), CEN (Centre for European Norms), EBRD (European Bank for Reconstruction and Development), IAF (International Accreditation Forum) and ILO (International Labour Organisation)

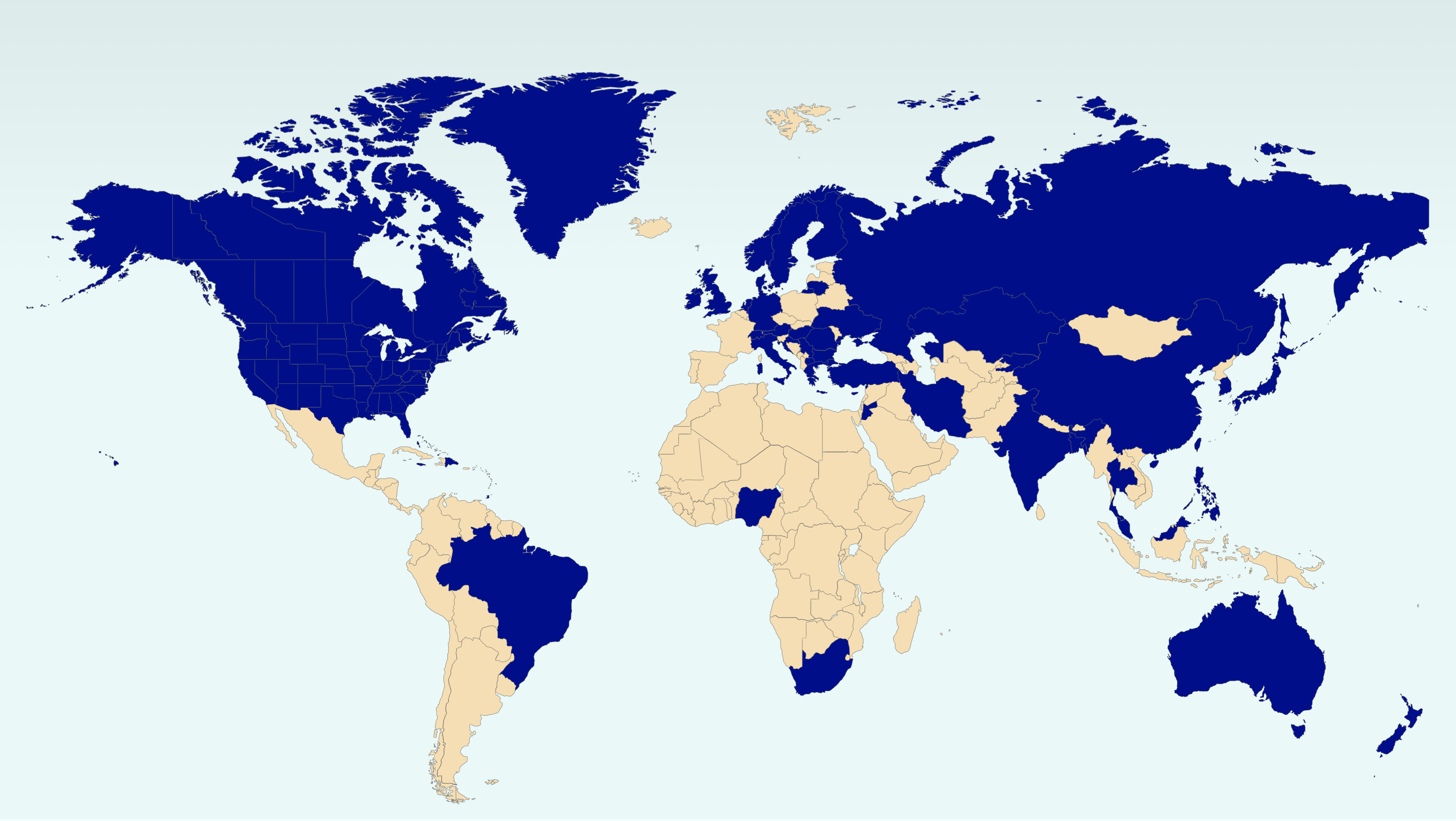
ICMCI member countries

In 2011 ICMCI began a coordinated series of initiatives which have led already to the appointment of ICMCI Academic fellows, the first awarding of the title "CMC Firm".

CMC-Global runs the Constantinus Awards which promote excellence in consulting worldwide.

In 2013, the organization started using the abbreviated name CMC-Global for its material, but retained its full legal name for official purposes.

== Structure ==
CMC-Global is a membership organisation with the only members being the leading professional body for management consultancy committed to the certification of management consultants in the country of their operation.

CMC-Global is registered as a Swiss Verein with its main council consisting of trustees. Most of the trustees are appointed by the institutes that are the members as defined in the above paragraph. The number of trustees for each country varies from 1 to 4 depending on the individual membership by individual management consultants in the country. The remaining trustees are officer trustees voted for every two years by all the trustees, the officers are chair, secretary, treasurer, and five vice chairs. Together these officers form the executive committee (ExCom). Reporting to ExCom are various other committees, work groups and task bodies depending on need. Permanent committees include Membership Committee (responsible for overseeing the admittance of new Members and the continuing adherence to the membership requirements of the existing Members), the Professional Standards Committee (which covers all professional matters including Standards), and the Quality Assurance Committee (responsible for checking that all Full Members award the Certified Management Consultant to the agreed Standard using the preferred assessment methods). A Nominations and Succession planning Committee (responsible for the election of officers and identifying and nurturing potential future office-holders) reports to the trustees as a whole.

Other committees always include some trustees but also may have individual management consultant members of the Institutes (and endorsed to be on the committee by that Institute)

All the office holders must be CMC holders and at the time of the election a trustee for one of the full jmembers. They are unpaid and contribute between (on average) three to one day a week of effort to the organisation.

The organisation has in 2013 appointed an executive director.

In support, the organisation has a permanent secretariat which undertakes the committee and trustee support, including accounting, communications, and web site provision.

The web site (www.cmc-global.org) should be consulted for the names and contact details of the office holders, the executive directorate and the secretariat.

== Certified Management Consultant (CMC) ==
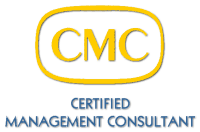
Certified Management Consultant "CMC" brand

Professional buyers of management consultancy worldwide specify that the key requirements of a management consultancy are in ascending order of priority: Knowledge (of management, the function, the sector, the general economy, the processes and the business professions), skills (analytic and inter-personal), competence (the ability to manage the assignment in close communication with the client), and trust (keeping organisational secrets, maintaining confidentiality, integrity). The major buyers are aware that the MBA, and other masters in management degrees provides evidence of underpinning knowledge and analytic skills and, depending on the course, maybe some courses in consultancy and a short period of relevant work experience.

CMC-Global understood these requirements and has developed the Certified Management Consultant qualification. This is primarily awarded by a competence based assessment against a defined CMC-Global Standard Competence Framework (see: http://www.icmci.org/?page=6972393) which uses prerequisites of evidence of possessing the underpinning knowledge and at least three years of successful practice. Client cases are examined and a competence assessment is undertaken. All holders of the qualification are required to be a member of their national ICMCI Member and thus are committed to a code of professional conduct at least as restrictive as that defined in the CMC-Global standard (see www.cmc-global.com ): failures to comply are subject to a disciplinary procedure which can result in the removal of the CMC designation.

The Certified Management Consultant is the equivalent (that is taking into account cultural differences) in all countries and was the first worldwide single business professional qualification.

== Academic Fellows ==
The CMC-Global Academic Fellow designation is intended to be a mark of distinction which recognises academics from around the world who have contributed to the study and teaching of management consultancy. It is awarded by CMC-Global to suitably qualified individuals based upon the recommendation of the local Institute of Management Consulting (IMC). Candidates must hold a position at a recognised academic institution, specifically a publicly accredited university and must be engaged in research and/or teaching within the external or internal management consulting field for a minimum of five years. Benefits to the local IMC:

- The attraction and engagement of a new stakeholder group that will add valuable new perspectives and insights within their management consulting community along with the expectation that the Fellow will demonstrate tangible on-going involvement with the management consulting profession.
- Increased membership through the potential development of management consulting streams within MBA or related Masters programs which could lead to award of the CMC credential upon suitable demonstration of knowledge (know what) and competence (know how).
- Pragmatic contributions to debates within the IMC on academic matters, including annual conferences where Fellows and other related academics can profile their research and teaching best practices.

Benefits to the Academic Fellow:

- Enhanced academic and professional profile arising from the appointment along with international peer recognition.
- Invitations to international conferences and hub meetings with the opportunity to showcase applied research and publications.
- Support for appropriate international research projects within the management consulting field, in terms of providing industry contacts and primary research respondents, along with endorsement of funding applications.
- Support for major student projects through CMC client introductions or directly for CMC practitioners.

The first round of nominations was received in 2013 with 16 academics from around the world awarded the Academic Fellow designation. An overall target of 100 Academic Fellows has been established.

== Membership ==
Membership of CMC-Global is only available to Associations or Institutes of Management Consultancy that satisfy the requirements listed below. Individual consultants are invited to contact their national Member Institute. If there is no CMC-Global member in their country they should contact GIMC

There are two classes of membership: Provisional Members and Full Members. Full Members are the only members who have had their assessment processes quality assured and can award the CMC (see section 2 above) and depending on their size appoint a number of delegates to CMC-Global – in effect the directors of CMC-Global.

All Members are required to be:

- formally created with a constitution that complies with CMC-Global expectations
- committed to certifying individual management consultants
- the most significant body satisfying the above in their country

In rare circumstances (language, history related) there may be more than one Member in a single country (as recognised by the UN)

== International programmes ==
UN NGO status

Having had corresponding status NGO with ECOSOC since 2001, ICMCI has been active in two ways. One is the reactive provision of advice and consideration to issues being examined by the ECOSOC and related bodies. Past examples have been on the benefits of indigenous competent management consultants to development projects and to enhancing the economy by increasing the capability and capacity of the economy. Another effort was to support the consideration of the use of new technologies in developing economies: the advice reiterated that for the introduction of extra technology to be successful, not only must the technology be appropriate but the people aspects (in all senses of the term) and the process implementation be also fitting to the need in order for the technology investment to be successful.

Academic Fellows

The CMC-Global Academic Fellow designation is awarded by CMC-Global to suitably qualified individuals based upon the recommendation of the local Institute of Management Consulting (IMC).

CMC Firm

CMC-Global awards an international accreditation of Management Consulting firms called the "CMC Firm". The accreditation recognises a firm for its standards with a specific focus on ethical practices, standards of conduct in addition to ability to practice management consulting to the highest standards. CMC-Global manages the global directory of the CMC Firms, published within the CMC-Global web site.

Accredited courses

CMC-Global has a scheme whereby the national Members can accredit a training course for management consultancy which is in accordance with CMC-Global's standards. This gives the course an internationally recognised approval imprimatur.

Relationships with other bodies

CMC-Global has been an observer to The International Accreditation Forum (IAF) since 2008.

CMC-Global led an initiative to develop an EU style service standard for management consultancy through CEN (Centre for European Norms) and sponsored the effort used to produce EN 16114 in 2011, with UNI Ente Nazionale Italiano di Unificazione (The Italian Standards Body) being the Secretariat for the project committee (PC) named CEN/PC 381, transformed in 2017 the CEN TC 381 permanent committee.

CMC-Global in 2013 promoted with ISO the constitution of a new working group, the project committee (PC) called ISO/PC 280 always to the Italian Secretariat of UNI, which generated the international standard ISO 20700:2017 Guidelines for Management Consultancy Services.

== Chair person history ==
- 1987-1989: John D. Roethle (USA)
- 1989-1991: Hedley Thomas (UK)
- 1991-1993: David Amar (Canada)
- 1993-1995: Michael Shays (USA)
- 1995-1997: Denis Tindley (UK)
- 1997-1999: Walter Vieira (India)
- 1999-2001: Hans de Sonnaville (Netherland)
- 2001-2003: Richard Elliott (Australia)
- 2003-2005: Barry Curnow (UK)
- 2005-2007: Peter Sorensen (Denmark)
- 2007-2009: Brian Ing (UK)
- 2009-2011: Aneeta Madhok (India)
- 2011-2013: Francesco D'Aprile (Italy)
- 2013-2015: Tim Millar (Australia)
- 2015-2018: Sorin Caian (Romania)
- 2018-2021: Dwight Mihalicz (Canada)
- 2021-2024: Robert Bodenstein (Austria)

== International conferences ==
Since 2013 CMC-Global organizes the annual "International CMC Conference", each year with a different organizing nation, associated with CMC-Global.

| Year | Description |
|---|---|
| 2013 | 1st International CMC Conference Johannesburg (South Africa) |
| 2014 | 2nd Seoul (South Korea) |
| 2015 | 3rd Noordwijk Amsterdam (The Netherland) |
| 2016 | 4th Toronto (Canada) |
| 2017 | 5th Astana (Kazakhstan) September, 4–7 |
| 2018 | 6th Milano (Italy) October, 16-19 |
| 2019 | 7th Nassau (Bahamas) October, 15-18 |
| 2020 | the 8th CMC-Global Conference (OnLine edition) |
| 2021 | the 9th CMC-Global Conference (OnLine edition) |
