= Certified management consultant =

"Certified management consultant" (CMC) is an international professional certification established in 1967 for management consulting professionals, awarded by institutes in 50 countries (as of February 2014). The CMC enjoys global reciprocity; consultants certified in one country are recognized in most other countries. The standards for CMC in technical competencies and professional conduct were developed by international associations; in the US, such an organization is the Institute of Management Consultants USA, and internationally, The International Council of Management Consulting Institutes (ICMCI).

== Criteria for joining the CMC title ==
Consultants awarded the CMC designation have demonstrated the following:

- Minimum of a Bachelor's degree from a recognized university.
- Master's degree in business administration or other master's degree in management or management consulting or pass qualifying exams in business related subjects.
- Three or more (depending on country) years of experience in full-time consulting.
- Owner or employee of a firm in independent practice, or internal consultant in organization meeting the institute's independence criteria.
- Demonstrated satisfaction by five different clients of consulting performance in challenging engagements.
- Produced descriptions of five client engagements, including problems addressed, solutions provided and results achieved.
- Interview by a panel of senior certified management consultants on approaches to and competencies in a range of consulting disciplines.
- Written and oral ethics examinations, adherence to a rigorous code of ethics and submission to enforcement by an independent adjudication body.
- Commitment to ongoing professional education.
- Renewal of certification every three years.

== Affiliated organizations ==
=== Canada ===
In Canada, holders of the CMC title are members of institutes administering the training leading to the title and supervising professional practice. In addition, regional chapters bring together members from each major region of the country: CMC-BC-Mainland, CMC-BC-Vancouver Island, CMC-ON-Greater Toronto area, CMC-BC-Southern interior, CMC-ON-Eastern Ontario and CMC-ON-Southwestern. While the Ordre des Administrateurs Agréés du Québec administers the Quebec chapter.
