= Bernard Lievegoed =

Dutch physician (1905–1992)

- Born: 2 September 1905; Medan, Sumatra
- Died: 12 December 1992 (aged 87); Zeist, the Netherlands
- Education: Doctor of Medicine and Psychiatry
- Occupations: Psychiatrist, Consultant for Organizational Development, Writer

Bernardus Cornelis Johannes Lievegoed (2 September 1905, Medan – 12 December 1992, Zeist) was a Dutch medical doctor, psychiatrist and author. He is most famous for establishing a theory of organizational development. He founded the N.P.I., or Netherlands Pedagogical Institute, which works with organizations and individuals to help these realize their economic, social and cultural goals. He also founded the Vrije Hogeschool in Driebergen.

== Life ==
Bernard Lievegoed was born in Medan, Sumatra (then the Dutch East Indies) in 1905. At nine, his family moved for three years to Rotterdam in the Netherlands. From 1917 to 1922, Lievegoed attended high school in Java. In 1924, he began a study of medicine in Groningen, taking a doctorate in 1928. In this same year he first became aware of anthroposophical remedial education; this encounter was to play a large role in his further development. In 1930 he completed the medical degree in Amsterdam and became a general practitioner in Bosch en Duin (near Zeist).

In 1931 Lievegoed founded the Zonnehuis, a home for children with disabilities, in Bosch in Duin. The Zonnehuis was later relocated to Zeist and, in the course of its expansion its name was changed to the Zonnehuizen Veldheim Steinia te Zeist. Lievegoed was the director of this institution from its founding until 1954.

In 1932 Lievegoed helped to found the Vrije School (free Waldorf school) of Zeist. In 1939 he did a higher doctorate (promotion) with a thesis about the therapeutic use of music. In 1946 he published the first of a number of books, Ontwikkelingsfasen van het kind; this was translated into eight languages and appeared in English as Phases of Childhood.

From 1948 to 1953 Lievegoed was a consultant for assistance to uneducated working-class children. During this time he published Planetenwirken und Lebensprozesse in Mensch und Erde (Planetary Influences and Life Processes in the Human Being and the Earth). In 1952 he cofounded the Vrij Geestesleven publishing house, oriented towards publishing works related to spiritual science. He became a member of the national commission on technical high schools; he served in this capacity until 1962.

In 1954 he founded the institution that became his life-work, the NPI. The original name, the Dutch Pedagogic Institute for Economics, was later changed to NPI: Institute for Organizational Development. He led this institute (in Zeist) for the next 17 years publishing The Developing Organisation in 1969 (published in English by Tavistock in 1973) with colleagues in the firm, notably Hans von Sasson, arguably the first influential European book on organisation development (. In 1955 he became extraordinary professor for social pedagogy at the Dutch Economic College (now Erasmus University in Rotterdam. In 1961 he helped to found a new technical college in Twente (now Twente University), which opened in 1964. Here he served as professor of social economics and Dean of the Economics Department until 1973. During this time he supported the work of the Kind en Instrument Foundation, out of which the international Choroi instrument-making workshops arose, and founded an association for therapeutic educators. With his colleagues in NPI he developed Theory U, which later developed as an influential management concept popularized by Otto Scharmer.

Between 1968 and 1976 Lievegoed was chair of a governmental commission on education that was given the task of transforming the educational system in the Netherlands. During this time he published a number of works (titles are given in approximate English translation): Organizational Development, Social Structures in Therapeutic Education, The Spiritual Impulse behind the Movement for Therapeutic Education, Towards the 21st Century and, together with his wife Nel Lievegoed-Schatborn, Aspects of Therapeutic Education. In 1971 he founded an independent university, the Vrije Hogeschool, in Driebergen. He was Dean of the University for the next eleven years.

In 1973 he left Erasmus University to cofound and become the managing director of the Vrije Pedagogisch Akademie, now Hogeschool Helicon (Helicon College). Over the next years, he published several more books: Phases (De levensloop van de mens, translated into eleven languages), Mystery Streams in Europe and the New Mysteries, and Organic Architecture. He joined the governmental commission on alternative medicine (1977–1981).

In 1983 Lievegoed published a play (De wadlopers, The Marsh-Flats) and another book, Man on the Threshold: Possibilities and Problems of Inner Development. He received the Gouden Ganzenveer honoring his cultural contributions; the report cited his complete works as the basis for the prize. Further publications: Contemplations on the Foundation Stone (1987), About Cultural Institutions (1988), Through the Eye of the Needle (1991) and About the Salvation of the Soul (published posthumously in 1993).

Lievegoed died on 12 December 1992 in Zeist.

== Books by Bernard Lievegoed ==
- Man on the Threshold - The Challenge of Inner Development
- The Developing Organization
- Managing the Developing Organization
- Phases - The Spiritual Rhythms in Adult Life
- Phases of Childhood
- The Eye of the Needle - Life and Working Encounter with Anthroposophy
- The Battle for the Soul - The working together of three great leaders of humanity
- Mystery Streams in Europe and the New Mysteries
- Towards the 21st Century: Doing the Good
