= University Innovation Fellows Program =

- Formation: 2012
- Headquarters: Stanford University
- Key people: Leticia Britos-Cavagnaro (Co-Director); Humera Fasihuddin (Co-Director)
- Website: https://universityinnovationfellows.org

The University Innovation Fellows Program is an international innovation fellowship program for undergraduate and graduate students based at Stanford University. The UIF program was created in 2012.

University Innovation Fellows, also known as "UIFs," come from a wide variety of colleges and universities worldwide.

== Origin ==
The UIF program was created in 2012 as part of an Epicenter (the National Center for Engineering Pathways to Innovation) grant, founded as a National Science Foundation (NSF)-funded STEM center and directed by Stanford University, Stanford Technology Ventures Program (Stanford University School of Engineering's entrepreneurship center), VentureWell, and the National Collegiate Inventors and Innovators Alliance. University Innovation Fellows come from a wide variety of colleges and universities geographically, including Berkeley, Carnegie Mellon, Columbia, Duke, Johns Hopkins, Michigan, MIT, Stanford, and Washington University in St. Louis, as well as international universities including Peking University, Padjadjaran University, Jawaharlal Nehru Technological University, Galgotias College of Engineering and Technology and Zhejiang University. Since the establishment of the program 1,838 University Innovation Fellows from 258 collegiate institutions have participated in the UIF program, representing 20 different countries, including the United States, India, China, and Germany, among others.

When the NSF grant period ended in June 2016, the University Innovation Fellows program became part of the Hasso Plattner Institute of Design (d.school) at Stanford University.

== Program ==
The UIF Program is a 6-week program led by Stanford faculty and former UIFs. Fellows are taught to conduct in-depth analysis of their societal and campus ecosystems, while exploring frameworks including design thinking and lean startup, and using their own experience to develop unique ideas to address unmet needs at their home institutions.

Each cohort of fellows has culminated with a weekend spent in the school undergoing entrepreneurship and innovation sessions facilitated by Stanford faculty. As the Program capstone, speakers from the White House, Google, Design for America, 3 Day Startup, and Google X who are leaders in business and innovation, like Steve Blank and Sebastian Thrun, have been featured in panel discussions.

== Honors ==
The University Innovation Fellows Program was celebrated and profiled by the White House and the Office of Science and Technology Policy (OSTP) during the Obama Administration in 2014. This was in recognition of Obama's proclamation of November as National Entrepreneurship Month.

In March 2015, the White House again featured the UIF Program, this time through its Office of the Press Secretary, as it lauded its efforts to combat the "60% of students who arrive at college intending to major in STEM subjects switch to other subjects, often in their first year." By partnering with colleges and universities to launch “#uifresh” (University Innovation Freshmen), the UIF-directed campaign was meant to expose incoming freshmen at a school to experiences in design thinking, entrepreneurship, and innovation and retain incoming students in STEM disciplines.

Etienne Wenger-Trayner and Beverly Wenger-Trayner, two social scientists focused on social learning theory, wrote Designing for Change: Using social learning to understand organizational transformation, about the UIF program as a case study of a social learning framework of value creation. The book was published in February 2019.
