= Customer development =

Methodology for building startups

Customer development is a formal methodology for building startups and new corporate ventures. It is one of the three parts that make up a lean startup (business model design, customer development, agile engineering).

The process assumes that early ventures have untested hypotheses about their business model (who are the customers, what features they want, what channel to use, revenue strategy/pricing tactics, how to get/keep/grow customers, strategic activities needed to deliver the product, internal resources needed, partners needed and costs). Customer development starts with the key idea that there are no facts inside your building so get outside to test them. The hypotheses testing emulates the scientific method – pose a business model hypothesis, design an experiment, get out of the building and test it. Take the data and derive some insight to either (1) Validate the hypothesis, (2) Invalidate the Hypothesis, or (3) Modify the hypothesis.

Some burgeoning startup companies devote their efforts to designing and refining their product and little time “getting out of the building.” The customer development model encourages that more time be spent in the field identifying potential consumers and learning how to meet their needs. The Customer Development concept emphasizes empirical research.

Customer development is the opposite of the “if we build it, they will come” product development-centered strategy, which is full of risks and can ultimately be the downfall of a company.

The customer development method was created by Steve Blank. According to Blank, startups are not simply smaller versions of larger, more developed companies. A startup operates in a fashion vastly different from that of a large company and employs different methods. While larger companies execute known and proven business strategies, startups must search for new business models. Customer Development guides the search for a repeatable and scalable business model.

== History ==
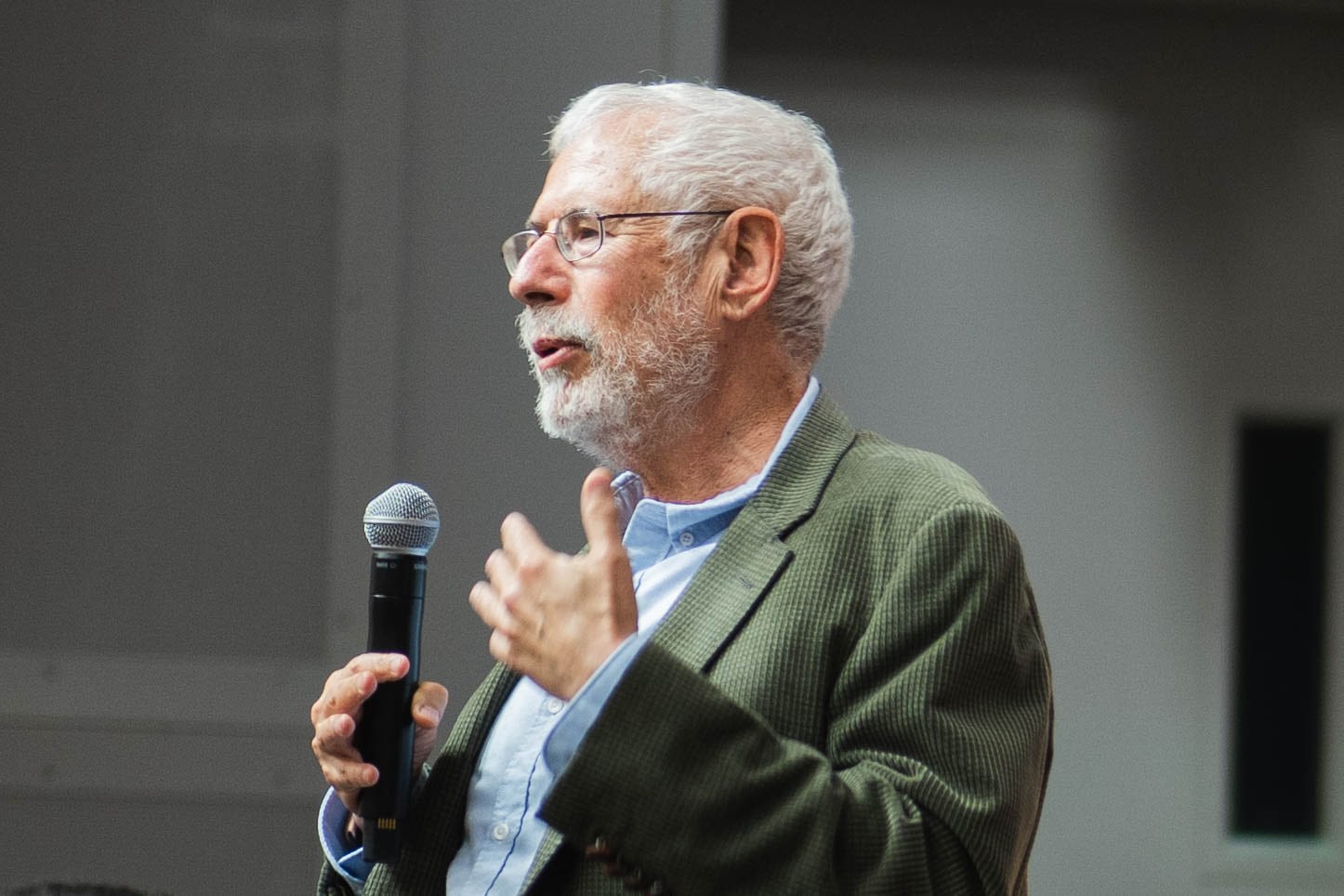
Steve Blank giving a lecture at Stanford University in 2024

Customer development was developed by Steve Blank in the 1990s. While writing about his experiences as an entrepreneur in Silicon Valley for his memoir, Blank began to notice patterns in the startups he was involved with. Recognizing that startups are not simply smaller versions of large companies, he observed that entrepreneurs need to have a systemized approach to guide their search for “repeatable and scalable business models.”

The revelation led to his first book, The Four Steps to the Epiphany: Successful Strategies for Products that Win, which served as the course text for his first class and heralded the birth of Customer Development, which in turn spawned the Lean Startup movement.

Blank's second book, The Startup Owner’s Manual, is a guide to building a startup using customer development principles.

== The four-step process ==
The customer development method consists of four steps that are designed to help avoid common pitfalls and repeat successful business strategies:

- Customer discovery first captures the founders’ vision and turns it into a series of business model hypotheses. Then it develops a plan to test customer reactions to those hypotheses and turn them into facts.
- Customer validation tests whether the resulting business model is repeatable and scalable. If not, founders should return to customer discovery.
- Customer creation is the start of execution. It builds end-user demand and drives it into the sales channel to scale the business.
- Company building transitions the organization from a startup to a company focused on executing a validated model.

== Customer Development Manifesto ==
The Customer Development Manifesto from The Startup Owner's Manual, written by Blank and Bob Dorf:

1. There Are No Facts Inside Your Building, So Get Outside
2. Pair Customer Development with Agile Development
3. Failure is an Integral Part of the Search
4. Make Continuous Iterations and Pivots
5. No Business Plan Survives First Contact with Customers So Use a Business Model Canvas
6. Design Experiments and Test to Validate Your Hypothesis
7. Agree on Market Type. It Changes Everything
8. Startup Metrics Differ from Those in Existing Companies
9. Fast Decision-Making, Cycle Time, Speed and Tempo
10. It's All About Passion
11. Startup Job Titles Are Very Different from a Large Company's
12. Preserve All Cash Until Needed. Then Spend.
13. Communicate and Share Learning
14. Customer Development Success Begins With Buy-In

== Teachings ==
Blank began teaching Customer Development in his entrepreneurship classes at Stanford University and UC Berkeley. His class, the Lean Launchpad, has since been adopted by more than 75 universities around the globe. In 2011, Blank's curriculum became the new standard for science commercialization in the U.S. as the National Science Foundation adopted it for their Innovation Corps.

== Business model ==
From the customer development view, a business model is a representation of how organizations create, deliver and capture value. It is designed to change rapidly, reflect customer reality and iterate as new information is discovered.

The business model is based on the mantra, “No business plan survives first contact with customers.” The business plan is an operating document that existing companies write to execute known business models. However, for a startup, there are too many unknowns to develop a successful plan. The static business plan necessarily changes as soon as the business comes in contact with its target market.

Startups are involved in searching for the right business model. The business model is tested in the real world (e.g., through a Minimum Viable Product) to gather customer input and make necessary changes. When a successful, repeatable business model is discovered, the company enters the product execution and business plan phase.

== Business model canvas ==
Alexander Osterwalder and Yves Pigneur designed the Business Model Canvas. The Canvas is a tool to help entrepreneurs structure and plan their business models. It is designed to change rapidly, highlight alternatives, promote a customer focus and encourage testing. It can also be used to set up Customer Development hypotheses and to visually track iterations.

The business model canvas is made up of nine blocks:

- Key partners
- Key activities
- Key resources
- Value propositions
- Customer relationships
- Channels
- Customer segments
- Cost structure
- Revenue streams

Osterwalder and Blank have integrated both business model design and customer development hypotheses into the business model canvas. Each of the nine blocks corresponds to one or more Customer Development hypotheses. When a hypothesis is found to be incorrect, entrepreneurs can apply Customer Development strategies to turn the mistake into a Pivot. As a Pivot, a failed hypothesis becomes a learning strategy, and the business model can be rewritten.

== Minimum viable product ==
The minimum viable product (MVP) is “that version of a new product which allows a team to collect the maximum amount of validated learning about customer with the least effort.” The startup releases the most minimal, core product to start testing early and minimize the total development process time.

The MVP allows entrepreneurs to gather feedback from early adopters to prevent pitfalls and avoid building unwanted products. The MVP also lets customers point out missing features and necessary changes.

To successfully use the MVP strategy, entrepreneurs must be committed to iteration. Customer feedback will bring the product or service through several changes before it is finalized.

== Hypotheses ==
Hypotheses are critical assumptions about how a business will work, and include assumptions about target market, pricing, and competitors. Together, hypotheses make up the business model for a startup.

Testing hypotheses means that the founder has to “get out of the building” and answer three questions about the business:

1. Do we really understand the customer's problem or need?
2. Do enough people outside of the company care about the problem to deliver huge business?
3. Will people care enough to tell their friends, which will help grow the business quickly?

Hypotheses can be tested in several ways. Creating an MVP is one way to quickly test mockups and ideas in the real world, especially with Web and mobile startups.

Hypotheses change as a result of testing and customer feedback. The changed hypotheses are incorporated into new iterations of the startup business model.

== Pivot ==
The pivot is “a structural course correction to test a new fundamental hypothesis about a product, strategy [or] engine of growth.” It is the process of changing a part or parts of the business model to reflect reality.

The customer development process assumes that most of the initial assumptions of the business model will be wrong. Pivoting involves recognizing that the original business model is not working, then deciding what changes to make and taking action on those changes. This process is easier to visualize when the business model is drawn out.

While iterating involves small changes like altering a product price, pivoting involves substantial changes like identifying a better target market. The process involves four steps:

1. Observe: Observing that the business model isn't working.
2. Orient: Orienting to the new facts.
3. Decide: Deciding what to change in the business model.
4. Act: Acting decisively to make the change.

There are several examples of successful companies that pivoted early on, including Groupon, which famously pivoted from a failed social advocacy campaign into a billion dollar daily deal site, and Fab.com, which pivoted from a social network to a daily deal design site. Instagram pivoted from a mobile microblogging platform into a photo application.
