= Adaptive learning =

Educational learning method using computer algorithms and AI

Adaptive learning, also known as adaptive teaching, is an educational method which uses computer algorithms as well as artificial intelligence to orchestrate the interaction with the learner and deliver customized resources and learning activities to address the unique needs of each learner. In professional learning contexts, individuals may "test out" of some training to ensure they engage with novel instruction. Computers adapt the presentation of educational material according to students' learning needs, as indicated by their responses to questions, tasks and experiences. The technology encompasses aspects derived from various fields of study including computer science, artificial intelligence, psychometrics, education, psychology, and brain science.

Research conducted, particularly in educational settings within the United States, has demonstrated the efficacy of adaptive learning systems in promoting student learning. Among 37 recent studies that examined the effects of adaptive learning on learning outcomes, an overwhelming majority of 86% (32 studies) reported positive effects.

Adaptive learning has been partially driven by a realization that tailored learning cannot be achieved on a large-scale using traditional, non-adaptive approaches. Adaptive learning systems endeavor to transform the learner from passive receptor of information to collaborator in the educational process. Adaptive learning systems' primary application is in education, but another popular application is business training. They have been designed as desktop computer applications, web applications, and are now being introduced into overall curricula.

== History ==
Adaptive learning, or intelligent tutoring, emerged from the artificial intelligence movement and gained traction in the 1970s. It was widely believed that computers would eventually develop human-like adaptability in learning. Early efforts focused on creating systems that adjusted to users' learning styles, but adoption was limited by high costs, large system sizes, and ineffective user interfaces. The start of the work on adaptive and intelligent learning systems is usually traced back to the SCHOLAR system that offered adaptive learning for the topic of geography of South America. Several other adaptive learning systems followed within five years, with early developments documented in the book Intelligent Tutoring Systems.

== Technology and methodology ==
Adaptive learning systems have traditionally been divided into separate components or 'models'. While different model groups have been presented, most systems include some or all of the following models (occasionally with different names):

- Expert model – The model with the information which is to be taught
- Student model – The model which tracks and learns about the student
- Instructional model – The model which actually conveys the information
- Instructional environment – The user interface for interacting with the system

=== Expert model ===
The expert model stores information about the material being taught, such as solutions for sets of questions, lessons and tutorials, or in more sophisticated systems, expert methodologies to illustrate approaches to the questions.

Adaptive learning systems that do not include an expert model typically incorporate these functions within the instructional model.

=== Student model ===
The simplest means of determining a student's skill level is the method employed in CAT (computerized adaptive testing). In CAT, the subject is presented with questions that are selected based on their level of difficulty in relation to the presumed skill level of the subject. As the test proceeds, the computer adjusts the subject's score based on their answers, continuously fine-tuning the score by selecting questions from a narrower range of difficulty.

An algorithm for a CAT-style assessment is simple to implement, and can be done as follows:

- A large pool of questions is amassed and rated according to difficulty, through expert analysis, experimentation, or a combination of the two.
- The computer then performs what is essentially a binary search, always giving the subject a question which is halfway between what the computer has already determined to be the subject's maximum and minimum possible skill levels.
- These levels are then adjusted to the level of the difficulty of the question, reassigning the minimum if the subject answered correctly, and the maximum if the subject answered incorrectly.

A certain margin for error has to be built in to allow for scenarios where the subject's answer is not indicative of their true skill level but simply coincidental. Asking multiple questions from one level of difficulty greatly reduces the probability of a misleading answer, and allowing the range to grow beyond the assumed skill level can compensate for possible incorrect evaluations.

A further extension of identifying weaknesses in terms of concepts is to program the student model to analyze incorrect answers. This is especially applicable for multiple choice questions. Consider the following example:

Q. Simplify: $2x^2 + x^3$

a) Can't be simplified
b) $3x^5$
c) ...
d) ...

In this case, a student who answers (b) is adding the exponents and failing to grasp the concept of like terms. As a result, the incorrect answer provides additional insight beyond the simple fact that it is incorrect.

=== Instructional model ===
The instructional model generally looks to incorporate the best educational tools that technology has to offer (such as multimedia presentations) with expert teacher advice for presentation methods. The level of sophistication of the instructional model depends greatly on the level of sophistication of the student model. In a CAT-style student model, the instructional model will simply rank lessons in correspondence with the ranks for the question pool. When the student's level has been satisfactorily determined, the instructional model provides the appropriate lesson. The more advanced student models which assess based on concepts need an instructional model which organizes its lessons by concept as well. The instructional model can be designed to analyze the collection of weaknesses and tailor a lesson plan accordingly.

When the incorrect answers are being evaluated by the student model, some systems look to provide feedback to the actual questions in the form of 'hints'. As the student makes mistakes, useful suggestions pop up such as "look carefully at the sign of the number". This too can fall in the domain of the instructional model, with generic concept-based hints being offered based on concept weaknesses, or the hints can be question-specific in which case the student, instructional, and expert models all overlap.

== Implementations ==
=== Learning management system ===
Many learning management systems have incorporated various adaptive learning features. A learning management system (LMS) is a software application for the administration, documentation, tracking, reporting and delivery of educational courses, training programs, or learning and development programs. Adaptive learning systems have previously been used, for instance, to help students develop their argumentative writing performance (Argument Mining).

=== Distance learning ===
Adaptive learning systems can be implemented on the Internet for use in distance learning and group collaboration.

The field of distance learning is now incorporating aspects of adaptive learning. Initial systems without adaptive learning were able to provide automated feedback to students who are presented questions from a preselected question bank. That approach however lacks the guidance which teachers in the classroom can provide. Current trends in distance learning call for the use of adaptive learning to implement intelligent dynamic behavior in the learning environment.

During the time a student spends learning a new concept they are tested on their abilities and databases track their progress using one of the models. The latest generation of distance learning systems take into account the students' answers and adapt themselves to the student's cognitive abilities using a concept called 'cognitive scaffolding'. Cognitive scaffolding is the ability of an automated learning system to create a cognitive path of assessment from lowest to highest based on the demonstrated cognitive abilities.

A current successful implementation of adaptive learning in web-based distance learning is the Maple engine of WebLearn by the Royal Melbourne Institute of Technology. WebLearn is advanced enough that it can provide assessment of questions posed to students even if those questions have no unique answer like those in the Mathematics field.

Adaptive learning can be incorporated to facilitate group collaboration within distance learning environments like forums or resource sharing services. Some examples of how adaptive learning can help with collaboration include automated grouping of users with the same interests, and personalization of links to information sources based on the user's stated interests or the user's surfing habits.

=== Educational game design ===
In 2014, an educational researcher concluded a multi-year study of adaptive learning for educational game design. The research developed and validated the ALGAE (Adaptive Learning GAme dEsign) model, a comprehensive adaptive learning model based on game design theories and practices, instructional strategies, and adaptive models. The research extended previous researching in game design, instructional strategies, and adaptive learning, combining those three components into a single complex model.

The study resulted in the development of an adaptive educational game design model to serve as a guide for game designers, instructional designers, and educators with the goal of increasing learning outcomes. Survey participants validated the value of the ALGAE model and provided specific insights on the model's construction, use, benefits, and challenges. The current ALGAE model is based on these insights. The model now serves as a guideline for the design and development of educational computer games.

The model's applicability is assessed as being cross-industry including government and military agencies/units, game industry, and academia. The model's actual value and the appropriate implementation approach (focused or unfocused) will be fully realized as the ALGAE model's adoption becomes more widespread.

== Development tools ==
While adaptive learning features are often mentioned in the marketing materials of tools, the range of adaptivity can be dramatically different.

Entry-level tools tend to focus on determining the learner's pathway based on simplistic criteria such as the learner's answer to a multiple choice question. A correct answer may take the learner to Path A, whereas an incorrect answer may take them to Path B. While these tools provide an adequate method for basic branching, they are often based on an underlying linear model whereby the learner is simply being redirected to a point somewhere along a predefined line. Due to this, their capabilities fall short of true adaptivity.

At the other end of the spectrum, there are advanced tools which enable the creation of very complex adaptions based on any number of complex conditions. These conditions may relate to what the learner is currently doing, prior decisions, behavioral tracking, interactive and external activities to name a few. These higher end tools generally have no underlying navigation as they tend to utilize AI methods such as an inference engine. Due to the fundamental design difference advanced tools are able to provide rich assessment capabilities. Rather than taking a simple multiple choice question, the learner may be presented with a complex simulation where a number of factors are considered to determine how the learner should adapt.

=== Popular tools ===
- Qualtrics

== See also ==
- Adaptive hypermedia
- Computerized adaptive testing
- Educational software
- Intelligent tutoring systems
- Learning management system
- Personalized learning
- Smart learning
- Validated learning
