= Assumption-based planning =

Assumption-based planning in project management is a post-planning method that helps companies to deal with uncertainty. It is used to identify the most important assumptions in a company's business plans, to test these assumptions, and to accommodate unexpected outcomes.

== Overview ==
Conventional business planning works on the expectation that managers can extrapolate future results from past experience, but for new businesses and projects this way of planning is often not possible. Experience may be lacking or extrapolating from past experience may be misleading.

Assumption-based planning methods include:

- Critical assumption planning (CAP) by D. Dunham & Co.
- Assumption-based planning by RAND : raises the visibility of make-or-break uncertainties common to new ventures by forcing managers to admit what they don't know.
- Discovery-Driven Planning by Rita Gunther McGrath and Ian C. MacMillan.

Assumption-based planning methodologies provided the foundation for other planning frameworks and tools such as Robust decision-making.

== Position in business planning process ==
Most business planning methods or books about "how to write a business plan" indicate that you should write down your financial assumptions at the end of your plan, but assumption-based planning encourages managers to actively plan and monitor the validation of these assumptions.

The identification of assumptions may lead to a change in the business plan, so advocates of assumption-based planning argue that it should be at the core of business planning.

== Types of assumption ==
RAND defines an assumption as "an assertion about some characteristic of the future that underlies the current operations or plans of an organization." There are several types of assumption. Include implicit and explicit assumptions, and primary and secondary assumptions, an important aspect of critical assumption planning. The two classifications are not mutually exclusive; an assumption can be both explicit and primary.

=== Implicit and explicit assumptions ===
Explicit assumptions are fully revealed without vagueness, implication, or ambiguity—though in a plan, they often rely on implicit assumptions. Implicit assumptions are not expressed and may go undetected. If implicit assumptions are wrong, this can damage projects.

Examples of implicit assumptions:
1. Customers will buy our product because we think it's a good product.
2. Customers will buy our product because it's technically superior.
3. Customers will agree with our perception that the product is great.
4. The product will sell itself
5. Distributors are desperate to stock and service the product.
6. We can develop the product on time and on budget.
7. Competitors will respond rationally.
8. We will be able to hold down prices while gaining share rapidly.
9. We will have no trouble attracting the right staff.
10. Customers run no risk in buying from us instead of continuing to buy from their past suppliers.

== Process ==
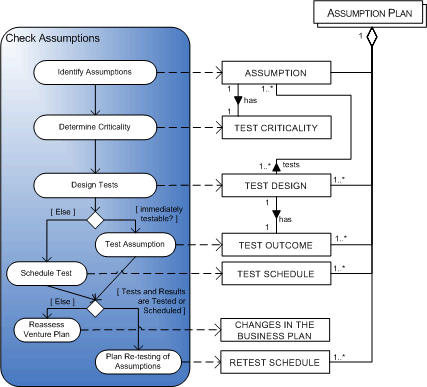
Assumption-based planning (ABP). The blue part of the figure depicts the process steps of a general assumption-based planning method, the white part identifies the separate deliverables. Every step is described in the assumption-based planning process list displayed below the picture.

The steps of assumption-based planning (ABP) are:

- Identify assumptions: Collect all assumptions implicit, explicit, primary and derivative, out of the (business) plan.
- Determine criticality: quantify assumptions as much as possible in order to determine which assumptions have the greatest (financial) impact.
- Design tests: Design a test for every critical assumption. In a test design you state how to test the assumption and what proves the assumption wrong or right.
- Schedule tests: Every critical assumption must be tested, but not all assumptions can be tested in the present. So future assumptions tests are scheduled in a test schedule. Some possible reasons to schedule a test in the future are a lack of information in the present or a dependency on the test outcomes of other tests.
- Test assumptions: When an assumption is tested this results in a test outcome, which proves the assumption right or wrong.
- Reassess plan: Based on the test outcomes and the test schedule one might decide to reassess the venture plan and update the business plan with the new insights gathered in the ABP process.
- Plan re-testing: assumptions must be re-tested regularly if not constantly. There should be a retest schedule for every critical assumption.
- Create or update the assumption plan: The assumption plan holds all data gathered during the ABP process.

== Critical assumption planning ==
Critical assumption planning (CAP) is a service mark of D. Dunham & Co. It helps managers and entrepreneurs maximize business development learning at least cost. The continuous process consists of six steps: Knowledge Base Assessment, Critical Assumption Planning, Test Program Design, Funding Request, Test Implementation and Venture Reassessment.

CAP is built on the foundation of the work of Block (1989) who showed that assumptions can stand in the way of perceiving current business realities. The identification and assessment of assumptions solves this problem and forms the foundation for managing new business ventures.

CAP involves six steps, combined in a "Learning Loop". Once all six steps are completed, a milestone is reached and the loop starts over again. The loop is constantly repeated as the business is developing.

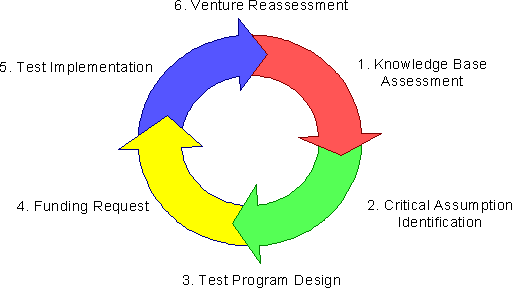
The Critical Assumption Planning Process

=== Knowledge-base assessment ===
This step takes "a comprehensive analysis of what is known and unknown about the competition, market and technology" (Sykes 1995). In this step the entrepreneur oversees his plans and the first assumptions are exposed. Important parts of the business plan to check are the definition of the business concept and an assessment of the competition.

=== Critical assumption identification ===
During this step the assumptions are identified and there is a determination of criticality. The hardest part of CAP is to identify the assumptions that are not written down.

To determine the criticality of the assumptions, they must be quantified. This makes it possible to put the financial results in a spreadsheet and link them. These financial impacts change for various assumptions.

CAP measures the criticality of an assumption as a change in the net present value of a venture (NPV). To determine criticality each assumption is assigned a range of uncertainty: base case, best and worst case. Then, assumption for assumption, while keeping the other assumptions at base case, the NPV changes for each assumption in the worst- and best-case scenarios are checked.

The NPV analysis proves the company with information about the criticality of an assumption. Two signals strongly indicate a critical assumption: a big difference in NPV between the best and worst-case scenarios, or a huge loss of NPV in the worst-case scenario

=== Test program design ===
The assumptions must be tested. Sometimes good market research is enough, other times a working prototype must be developed. The testing order for assumptions is critical in terms of testing cost. A major focus of the CAP method is to maximize the learning per unit expenditure on testing.

To determine the best testing option, the test Effectiveness ratio (e) is calculated for one or more assumptions based on the estimated Costs (C), Time spend on testing (T) and the estimated reduction (R) between the NPV values of the assumptions (P as a percentage of the NPV range). Using these parameters, the effectiveness ratio (e) is calculated:

$e = \frac{\sum (PR)}{CT}$

Once the best testing option is chosen from the different test effectiveness values, the organisation can finish the planning of the test.

=== Funding request ===
When the test program design is ready and the costs are clear, resources must be allocated to the test program. In most companies or start-ups clearance from senior managers or venture capitalists is needed to conduct the tests.

=== Test implementation ===
In this step the actual testing of the assumptions takes place.

=== Venture reassessment ===
When the results of one or more tests are known, it might be that resources must be re-allocated and business plans updated.
