= Digital transformation =

Adoption of digital technology by an organisation

Digital transformation (DT) is the process of adoption and implementation of digital technology by an organization in order to create new or modify existing products, services and operations by the means of translating business processes into a digital format.

The goal for its implementation is to increase value through innovation, invention, improved customer experience and efficiency. Focusing on efficiency and costs, the Chartered Institute of Procurement & Supply (CIPS) defines "digitalisation" as

the practice of redefining models, functions, operations, processes and activities by leveraging technological advancements to build an efficient digital business environment – one where gains (operational and financial) are maximised, and costs and risks are minimised.

Digitalization calls for new approaches to workplace communication and collaboration. It can be understood as the use of digital technologies and data (both digitized and natively digital) to create revenue, improve business operations, and replace or transform business processes, rather than simply digitizing them. According to researchers, it also creates an environment for digital business. However, since there are no comprehensive data sets on digital transformation at the macro level, the overall effect of digital transformation is still (as of 2020), too early to comment.

While there are approaches which see digital transformation as an opportunity to be seized quickly if the dangers of delay are to be avoided, a useful incremental approach to transformation called discovery-driven planning (DDP) has been proven to help solve digital challenges, especially for traditional firms. This approach focuses on step-by-step transformation instead of the all-or-nothing approach. A few benefits of DDP are risk mitigation, quick response to changing market conditions, and increased success rateforo digital transformations.

== Benefits, barriers and enablers ==
=== Benefits ===
One of the key advantages of digital transformation is its ability to process and transmit information efficiently and transparently. First, digital transformation frees businesses from the constraints of time and space, thereby facilitating access to a greater amount of information. One research observed that companies equipped with extensive information networks tend to exhibit greater adaptability in responding to environmental changes.

Second, digital transformation accelerates business model innovation and facilitates new forms of collaboration among companies. A survey conducted in 2016 of 219 small high-tech companies in Sweden found that those with information technology advantages could strengthen their dynamic capabilities by improving internal efficiency and developing closer relationships with customers and suppliers. Digital technology also enables companies to examine customer preferences, design and develop new products, provide higher-value-added services, improve user experience, and create additional value. These developments are reflected in the use of digital platforms such as Amazon, eBay, Alibaba, Facebook and Instagram, which enable businesses to engage with customers, analyze consumer preferences and improve their marketing strategies.

Third, digital transformation initiatives within enterprises have been found to have a statistically significant impact on stock liquidity. An empirical investigation using data from Chinese listed companies covering the period from 2007 to 2018 examined the effects of enterprise digital transformation on stock liquidity.

However, digital transformation can also lead to disruptive changes, rendering existing business models obsolete as a result of rapid advances in digital technologies.

=== Barriers ===
There are multiple common barriers that digital transformation initiatives, projects and strategies face. One of the main barriers is change management, because changes in processes may face active resistance from workers. Related to change management is the miscommunication between workers, which can lead to implementation delays or even complete project failure. Some companies are unable to develop a realistic cost projection due to a too optimistic view of the process. Companies may have legacy systems in place, which can lead to integration difficulties with new systems. Within organizations there may also be a lack of resources, top management support, workers' skills, commitment, collaboration and vision.

Some company cultures can struggle with the changes required by digital transformation. Additionally, in many cases, companies that focus solely on adapting their products or services through digitalization, without fully exploring the innovative potential of digital technologies, risk overlooking opportunities for transformation. Instead of using collected data to develop new product lines or personalized services, some firms may focus only on enhancing existing functionalities, thereby limiting their potential for growth and innovation. Using digital transformation solely to support existing products can stagnate innovation, as firms may fail to adapt to changing market demands and rapid technological developments. In contrast, firms that adopt a holistic approach to digital transformation and integrate new technologies into all aspects of their business models are more likely to innovate and achieve sustainable long-term growth. Therefore, success in the digital age requires more than the digitalization of existing products; it involves rethinking the entire business model and how technology can create new and sustainable value.

=== Enablers ===
In addition to the several barriers to digital transformation, there are also numerous enablers of digital transformation. The primary enablers are organizations' resources and capabilities, workers' skills, technologies and culture. The aforementioned enabler "Organizations resources and capabilities" refers to the ability of an organization to adapt to contemporary issues arising in the business environment, as well as their capabilities in the field of data analytics. Regarding "Workers' skills", workers must be able to develop valuable insights with the use of data, have significant emotional intelligence and effectively partake in the development of new products. Thirdly, technology is also a vital enabler of digital transformation. Companies can benefit from having access to artificial intelligence, data analytics software and effective usage of social media. Lastly, "Culture" pertains to the extent the organizational culture is data-driven and the quality of the top management support and engagement within the corporation.

== History ==
Digitization is the process of converting analog information into digital form using an analog-to-digital converter, such as in an image scanner or for digital audio recordings. As internet usage has increased since the 1990s, the use of digitization has also increased. Digital transformation, however, is broader than the digitization of existing processes. It involves considering how products, processes, and organizations can be changed through the use of new digital technologies. A 2019 review proposed defining digital transformation as "a process that aims to improve an entity by triggering significant changes to its properties through combinations of information, computing, communication, and connectivity technologies". Digital transformation can be seen as a socio-technical programme.

A 2015 report stated that maturing digital companies were using cloud hosting, social media, mobile devices and data analytics, while other companies were using individual technologies for specific problems. By 2017, one study found that less than 40% of industries had become digitized (although usage was high in the media, retail and technology industries).

Over the period of 2017 to 2020, 70% of European municipalities increased their spending on digital technologies. In 2019, Boston Consulting Group estimated that 3.5% to 6% of international trade at that time was digitally enabled, so the technology was "far from dominant", and as of 2020, 37% of European companies and 27% of American companies had not embraced digital technology. However, in a 2021 survey, 55% of European companies stated the COVID-19 pandemic has increased the demand for digital technology, and 46% of companies reported that by then they have grown more digital. Half of these companies anticipate an increase in the usage of digital technologies in the future, with a greater proportion being companies that have previously used digital technology. A lack of digital infrastructure was viewed as a key barrier to investment by 16% of EU businesses, compared to 5% in the US.

In a 2021 survey, 89% of African banks surveyed reported that the pandemic had accelerated the digital transformation of their internal operations.

In 2022, 53% of businesses in the EU reported taking action or making investments in becoming more digital. 71% of companies in the US reported using at least one advanced digital technology, similar to the average usage of 69% across EU organizations.

== TOP Framework ==
Digital transformation plays a crucial role in alleviating the adverse effects of simultaneous and interconnected challenges while also strengthening the resilience and adaptability of both organizations and supply chains. Represented by the TOP framework, digital transformation acts as a catalyst for generating and leveraging benefits. These benefits have the potential to enhance resilience not only within individual organizations but also across the entire supply chain.

=== Technology ===
It does so by leveraging cutting-edge technologies to enhance predictive power and responsiveness. Technologies include the Internet of Things, big data analytics, artificial intelligence, simulation, additive manufacturing, blockchain, and digital twins.

=== Organization ===
Digital transformation within organizational culture is associated with changes in management practices, collaboration across departments, and supply chains. It also relates to organizational responses to operational changes.

=== People ===
Organizational communication involves coordination between departments and employees. Management skills in communication, leadership, and strategy are applied in organizational operations and in addressing challenges.

== Role of resources and capabilities ==
According to the resource-based view theory, successful firms' resources should be valuable, rare, non-imitable, and non-substitutable in order for capabilities such as responsiveness, flexibility, or even agility to be developed. "A capability is a concept that refers to an organization's use of a set of resources to carry out its routine and strategic activities".

The digital transformation capability (DTC) framework is a direct application of this theory, stating that resources can be either tangible, intangible or human. The tangible side of the DTC framework gathers physical assets like the organization's IT infrastructure, whereas the intangible side focuses on its digital transformation strategy, knowledge, and reputational capital. Human resources are broader and include technical skills, continuous training, leadership, and social skills.

== Sustainability and digital transformation ==
Digital transformation is often described as a reactive response to factors such as customer demands, competitive pressures, and regulatory requirements. However, it can be a proactive opportunity for organizations to achieve sustainable business practices and facilitate a circular economy. By building sensing, smart, sustainable, and social capabilities, enterprises can capture valuable information, make faster and smarter decisions, and adapt to changing environments.

Aligning digital transformation with sustainability can enhance performance by engaging stakeholders, optimizing resource allocation, and reducing risks. A comprehensive business case that prioritizes sustainability benefits and multidimensional returns can secure the necessary resources for successful implementation. To achieve sustainability goals, effective governance, integration, change management, and stakeholder involvement are critical factors.

== See also ==
- E-learning
- Electronic medical record
- Government Digital Service
- Online shopping
- Real estate
- Supply chain
