= Lean startup =

Early business development tool

Lean startup is a methodology for developing businesses and products that aims to shorten product development cycles and rapidly discover if a proposed business model is viable; this is achieved by adopting a combination of business-hypothesis-driven experimentation, iterative product releases, and validated learning. Lean startup emphasizes customer feedback over intuition and flexibility over planning. This methodology enables recovery from failures more often than traditional ways of product development.

Central to the lean startup methodology is the belief that when startup companies invest their time into building products or services to meet the needs of early customers, the company can reduce market risks and sidestep the need for large amounts of initial project funding and expensive product launches and financial failures. While the events leading up to the launch can make or break a new business, it is important to start with the end in mind, meaning thinking about the direction in which a business will grow and how that growth can be achieved.

== Overview ==
Similar to the precepts of lean manufacturing and lean software development, the lean startup methodology seeks to eliminate wasteful practices and increase value-producing practices during the earliest phases of a company so that the company can have a better chance of success without requiring large amounts of outside funding, elaborate business plans, or a perfect product. Customer feedback during the development of products or services is integral to the lean startup process, and ensures that the company does not invest time designing features or services that consumers do not want. This is done primarily through two processes: using key performance indicators and a continuous deployment process.

When a startup company cannot afford to have its entire investment depend upon the success of a single product or service, the lean startup methodology proposes that by releasing a minimum viable product that is not yet finalized, the company can then make use of customer feedback to help further tailor the product or service to the specific needs of its customers.

The lean startup methodology asserts that "lean has nothing to do with how much money a company raises"; rather it has everything to do with assessing the specific demands of consumers and how to meet that demand using the least amount of resources possible.

== Precursors ==
=== Lean manufacturing ===
Use of the word lean to describe the streamlined production system of lean manufacturing was popularized by the 1990 book The Machine That Changed the World. The Toyota Production System pioneered by Taiichi Ohno combined flow principles that had been used by Henry Ford since the early 1900s with innovations such as the TWI programs introduced to Japan in 1951.

Lean manufacturing systems consider the expenditure of resources for any goal other than the creation of value for the end customer as waste, and they continually seek ways to eliminate such waste. In particular, such systems focus on:

- Minimizing inventory throughout the assembly line,
- Using Kanban cards to signal only when the necessary inputs to production are needed, and in so doing, reduce assembly waste (inventory) and increase productivity,
- Identifying mistakes or imperfections during assembly as early as possible at immediate quality control checkpoints to ensure that the least amount of time is expended developing a faulty product, and
- Maintaining close connections with suppliers in order to understand their customers' desires.

Lean manufacturing was later applied to software as lean software development.

=== Customer development ===
The lean startup methodology is based on the customer development methodology of Silicon Valley serial entrepreneur-turned-academic Steve Blank. In his book The Four Steps to the Epiphany: Successful Strategies for Products that Win (2005, 5th edition 2013), Blank pointed out the pitfalls of a narrow emphasis on product development; instead he argued that startups should focus on what he called "customer development", which emphasizes "learning about customers and their problems as early in the development process as possible". Blank's customer development methodology proposed four steps:

1. Customer discovery tests hypotheses about the nature of the problem, interest in the product or service solution, and business viability.
2. Customer validation tests the business viability through customer purchases and in the process creates a "sales road map", a proven and repeatable sales process. Customer discovery and customer validation corroborate the business model.
3. Customer creation executes the business plan by scaling through customer acquisition, creating user demand and directing it toward the company's sales channels.
4. Company building formalizes and standardizes company departments and operations.

In an article published in the Harvard Business Review in 2013, Steve Blank described how the lean startup methodology also drew inspiration from the work of people like Ian C. MacMillan and Rita Gunther McGrath who developed a technique called discovery-driven planning, which was an attempt to bring an entrepreneurial mindset to planning.

== Principles ==
In his blog and book The Lean Startup, entrepreneur Eric Ries used specific terms to refer to the core lean startup principles, as described below.

=== Minimum viable product ===
A minimum viable product (MVP) is the "version of a new product which allows a team to collect the maximum amount of validated learning about customers with the least effort" (similar to a pilot experiment). The goal of an MVP is to test fundamental business hypotheses (or leap-of-faith assumptions) and to help entrepreneurs begin the learning process as quickly as possible.

As an example, Ries noted that Zappos founder Nick Swinmurn wanted to test the hypothesis that customers were ready and willing to buy shoes online. Instead of building a website and a large database of footwear, Swinmurn approached local shoe stores, took pictures of their inventory, posted the pictures online, bought the shoes from the stores at full price after he'd made a sale, and then shipped them directly to customers. Swinmurn deduced that customer demand was present, and Zappos would eventually grow into a billion dollar business based on the model of selling shoes online.

=== Continuous deployment (only for software development) ===
Continuous deployment, similar to continuous delivery, is a process "whereby all code that is written for an application is immediately deployed into production," which results in a reduction of cycle times. Ries stated that some of the companies he's worked with deploy new code into production as often as 50 times a day. The phrase was coined by Timothy Fitz, one of Ries's colleagues and an early engineer at IMVU.

=== Split testing ===
A split or A/B test is an experiment in which "different versions of a product are offered to customers at the same time." The goal of a split test is to observe differences in behavior between the two groups and to measure the impact of each version on an actionable metric.

A/B testing is sometimes incorrectly performed in serial fashion, where a group of users one week may see one version of the product while the next week users see another. This undermines the statistical validity of the results, since external events may influence user behavior in one time period but not the other. For example, a split test of two ice cream flavors performed in serial during the summer and winter would see a marked decrease in demand during the winter where that decrease is mostly related to the weather and not to the flavor offer.

Another way to incorrectly A/B test is to assign users to one or another A/B version of the product using any non-random method.

=== Actionable metrics vs vanity metrics ===
Actionable metrics can lead to informed business decisions and subsequent action. These are in contrast to vanity metrics—measurements that give "the rosiest picture possible" but do not accurately reflect the key drivers of a business.

Vanity metrics for one company may be actionable metrics for another. For example, a company specializing in creating web based dashboards for financial markets might view the number of web page views per person as a vanity metric as their revenue is not based on number of page views. However, an online magazine with advertising would view web page views as a key metric as page views are directly correlated to revenue.

A typical example of a vanity metric is "the number of new users gained per day". While a high number of users gained per day seems beneficial to any company, if the cost of acquiring each user through expensive advertising campaigns is significantly higher than the revenue gained per user, then gaining more users could quickly lead to bankruptcy.

=== Pivot ===
A pivot is a "structured course correction designed to test a new fundamental hypothesis about the product, strategy, and engine of growth." A notable example of a company employing the pivot is Groupon; when the company first started, it was an online activism platform called The Point. After receiving almost no traction, the founders opened a WordPress blog and launched their first coupon promotion for a pizzeria located in their building lobby. Although they only received 20 redemptions, the founders realized that their idea was significant, and had successfully empowered people to coordinate group action. Three years later, Groupon would grow into a billion dollar business.

Steve Blank defines a pivot as "changing (or even firing) the plan instead of the executive (the sales exec, marketing or even the CEO)."

=== Innovation accounting ===
This topic focuses on how entrepreneurs can maintain accountability and maximize outcomes by measuring progress, planning milestones, and prioritizing. The topic was later expanded upon to include three levels of innovation accounting related to the types of assumptions being validated.

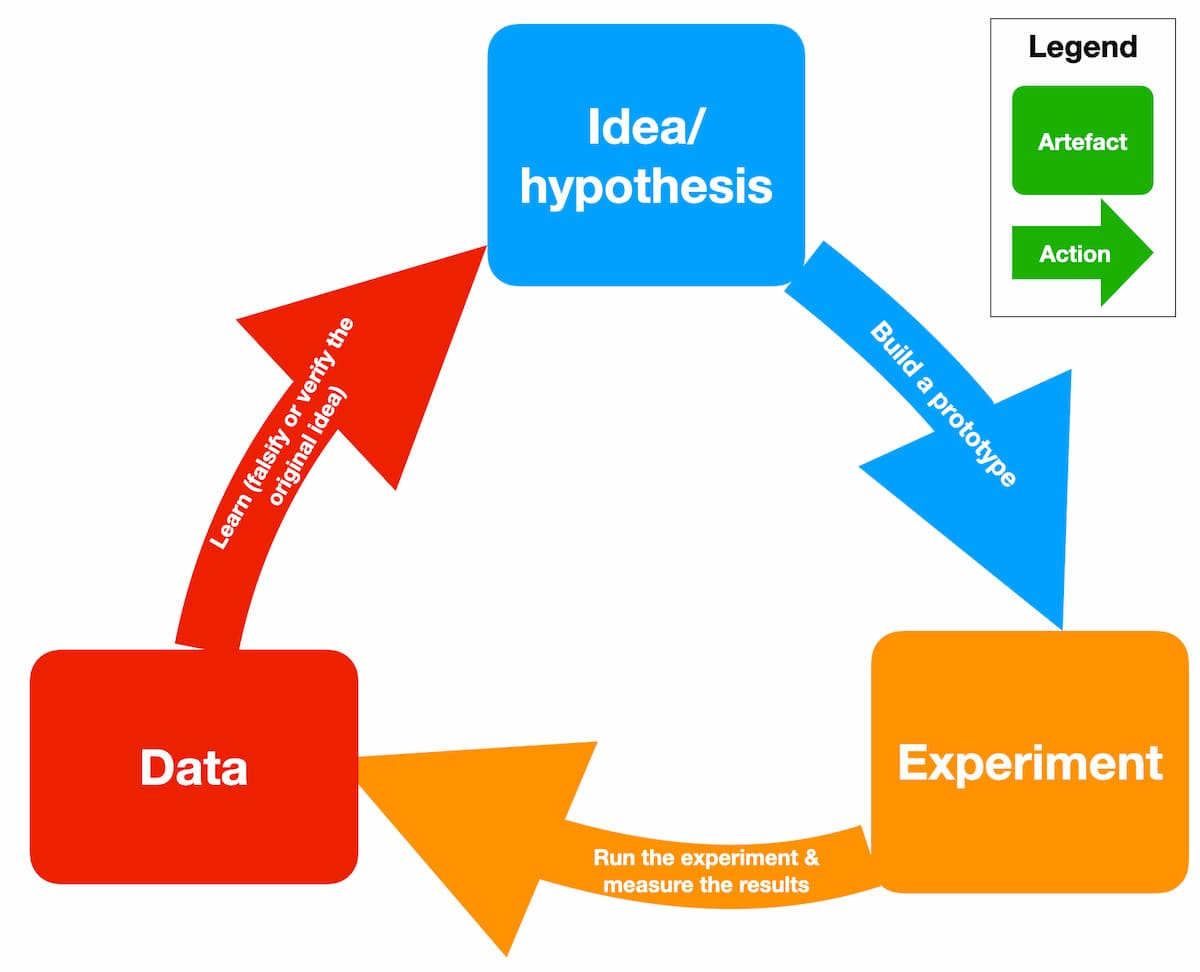
Artefacts and actions in the Build-Measure-Learn loop

=== Build-Measure-Learn ===
The Build–Measure–Learn loop emphasizes speed as a critical ingredient to customer development. A team or company's effectiveness is determined by its ability to ideate, quickly build a minimum viable product of that idea, measure its effectiveness in the market, and learn from that experiment. In other words, it is a learning cycle of turning ideas into products, measuring customers' reactions and behaviors against built products, and then deciding whether to persevere or pivot the idea; this process repeats as many times as necessary. The process can also be viewed as a test of hypotheses. The phases of the loop are: Ideas → Build → Product → Measure → Data → Learn.

== Business model templates ==
=== Business model canvas ===
The business model canvas is a strategic management template invented by Alexander Osterwalder around 2008 for developing new business models or documenting existing ones. It is a visual chart with elements describing a firm's value proposition, infrastructure, customers, and finances. It assists firms in aligning their activities by illustrating potential trade-offs.

The template consists of nine blocks: activities, partners, resources, value proposition, customers, customer channels, customer relationships, costs and revenue. Startups use the template (and/or other templates described below) to formulate hypotheses and change their business model based on the success or failure of tested hypotheses.

=== Other canvases ===
==== Lean canvas ====
The lean canvas is a version of the business model canvas adapted by Ash Maurya in 2010 specifically for startups. The lean canvas focuses on addressing broad customer problems and solutions and delivering them to customer segments through a unique value proposition. "Problem" and "solution" blocks replace the "key partners" and "key activities" blocks in the business model canvas, while "key metrics" and "unfair advantage" blocks replace the "key resources" and "customer relationships" blocks, respectively.

==== Value proposition canvas ====
The value proposition canvas is a supplement to the business model canvas ("customer segment" and "value proposition" blocks) published in 2012 to address the customer–product relationship, the perceived value of the product or service, and potential product/market fit. The "value proposition" block is divided into three categories—products and services, gain creators, and pain relievers—that correspond to three categories in the "customer segment" block—customer jobs, gains, and pains.

==== Mission model canvas ====
The mission model canvas is a version of the business model canvas developed by Alexander Osterwalder and Steve Blank for entities such as government agencies that have a predetermined budget instead of a goal of raising revenue. It was published in 2016. Earlier publications by Osterwalder and colleagues had suggested how to adapt the business model canvas for nonprofit enterprises that depend on raising revenue. "Mission budget/cost" and "mission achievement/impact factors" blocks replace the "cost structure" and "revenue streams" blocks in the business model canvas, while "beneficiaries", "buy-in/support" and "deployment" blocks replace the "customer segments", "customer relationships" and "channels" blocks, respectively.

== The movement ==
Ries and others created an annual technology conference called Startup Lessons Learned which has subsequently changed its name to the Lean Startup Conference. Lean startup meetups in cities around the world have garnered 20,000 regular participants. The first lean startup meetup named Lean Startup Circle was created by Rich Collins on June 26, 2009 hosting speaking events, workshops, and roundtable discussions. As of 2012, there are lean startup meetups in over 100 cities and 17 countries as well as an online discussion forum with over 5500 members. Third-party organizers have led lean startup meetups in San Francisco, Chicago, Boston, Austin, Beijing, Dublin, and Rio de Janeiro, among others—many of which are personally attended by Ries—with the Chicago and New York City Lean Startup Meetups attracting over 4,000 members each. The Lean Startup Machine created a new spin on the lean startup meetups by having attendees start a new company in three days. As of 2012, the Lean Startup Machine claimed to have created over 600 new startups this way.

Prominent high-tech companies have begun to publicly employ the lean startup methodology, including Intuit, Dropbox, Wealthfront, Votizen, Aardvark, and Grockit. The lean startup principles are also taught in classes at Harvard Business School and UC Berkeley and are implemented in municipal governments through Code for America.

Academic researchers in Finland have applied the lean startup methodology to accelerating research innovation.

=== In the government ===
The United States Government has employed lean startup ideas. The Federal Chief Information Officer of the United States, Steven VanRoekel noted in 2012 that he was taking a "lean-startup approach to government". Ries has worked with the former and current Chief Technology Officers of the United States—Aneesh Chopra and Todd Park respectively—to implement aspects of the lean startup model. In particular, Park noted that in order to understand customer demand, the Department of Health and Human Services recognized "the need to rapidly prototype solutions, engage customers in those solutions as soon as possible, and then quickly and repeatedly iterate those solutions based on working with customers". In May 2012, Ries and The White House announced the Presidential Innovation Fellows program, which brings together top citizen innovators and government officials to work on high-level projects and deliver measurable results in six months.

==== Hacking for Defense ====
Steve Blank, working with retired United States Army colonel Pete Newell and former United States Army Special Forces colonel Joe Felter, adapted lean startup principles for U.S. government innovation under the moniker "Hacking for Defense", a program in which university students solve problems that the Department of Defense, the United States Armed Forces, and the United States Intelligence Community submit to participating universities. Hacking for Defense and variants like Hacking for Diplomacy have expanded to the United States Department of State, Department of Energy, NASA, and nonprofits.

== Lean concepts ==
Lean startup principles have been applied to specific competencies within typical startups and larger organizations:

- Lean analytics
- Lean brand management
- Lean hardware
- Lean events
- Lean manufacturing
- Lean marketing
- Lean product management
- Lean sales
- Lean software development
- Lean UX

== History ==
The lean startup methodology was first proposed in 2008 by Eric Ries, using his personal experiences adapting lean management and customer development principles to high-tech startup companies. The methodology has since been expanded to apply to any individual, team, or company looking to develop new products, services, or systems without unlimited resources. The lean startup's reputation is due in part to the success of Ries' bestselling book, The Lean Startup, published in September 2011.

Ries' said that his first company, Catalyst Recruiting, failed because he and his colleagues did not understand the wants of their target customers, and because they focused too much time and energy on the initial product launch. Next, Ries was a senior software engineer with There, Inc., which Ries described as a classic example of a Silicon Valley startup with five years of stealth R&D, $40 million in financing, and nearly 200 employees at the time of product launch. In 2003, There, Inc. launched its product, There.com, but they were unable to garner popularity beyond the initial early adopters. Ries claimed that despite the many proximate causes for failure, the most important mistake was that the company's "vision was almost too concrete", making it impossible to see that their product did not accurately represent consumer demand.

Although the lost money differed by orders of magnitude, Ries concluded that the failures of There, Inc. and Catalyst Recruiting shared similar origins: "it was working forward from the technology instead of working backward from the business results you're trying to achieve."

After Ries later co-founded IMVU Inc., IMVU investor Steve Blank insisted that IMVU executives audit Blank's class on entrepreneurship at UC Berkeley. Ries applied Blank's customer development methodology and integrated it with ideas from lean software development and elsewhere to form the lean startup methodology.

== Reception ==
Ben Horowitz, the co-founder of venture capital firm Andreessen Horowitz, wrote an article in 2010 criticizing the lean startup method for over-emphasizing "running lean" (constantly cutting and reducing non-essential parts of the company to save time and money). He specifically disagreed with portraying "running lean" as an end rather than a means to winning the market without running out of cash. Horowitz gave as an example his startup Loudcloud, which by "running fat" was able to outperform 20 direct competitors and after 8 years reach a value of $1.6 billion. However, at least since 2008, numerous advocates of lean methods have pointed out that "running lean" does not mean cost cutting.

Trey Griffith, the VP of technology at Teleborder, stated in 2012 that the majority of backing for the lean startup methodology was anecdotal and had not been rigorously validated when first presented. However, he went on to note that better support of the method comes out of a 2011 analysis of the factors of success in growth companies as described in the 2011 book Great by Choice.

Lean startup has also been the source of attention in the academic literature. For example, Stanford professor Riitta Katila finds empirical support for lean startup. However, a group of prominent strategy and innovation scholars—Teppo Felin, Alfonso Gambardella, Scott Stern and Todd Zenger—argue that the application of lean manufacturing principles to startups is highly problematic and only creates incremental outcomes for startups that use the method. Other scholars, including Wharton's Dan Levinthal, argue that many of the insights of lean startup have already been anticipated by the technology evolution, organizational learning and other literatures. A 2019 article in The Conversation said it quickly became a foundational work in entrepreneurship classes. The article also summarized three scenarios where the model should not be used: in some industries have such high costs or risks with prototyping, when testing costs outweigh benefits, and when a lack of experience hinders the team's ability to interpret experiments. The value of lean startup continues to be debated and discussed in the academic literature.

== See also ==
- Design thinking
