= Lean Launchpad =

Entrepreneurship methodology

Lean LaunchPad is an entrepreneurship methodology created by Steve Blank to test and develop business models based on querying and learning from customers. It is said to be based on the scientific method and combines experiential learning with “The three building blocks of a successful lean startup”: Alexander Osterwalder's "Business Model Canvas", Steve Blank's "Customer Development Model", and Agile Engineering.

Students of Lean LaunchPad are said to propose and immediately test business hypotheses. It is also said that they get out of the building to talk with prospective customers and partners, using this customer feedback acquired in these interviews to refine their product or service; ensure their product or service meets a customer need or solves a customer problem; and validate that they have created a repeatable, scalable business model.

== Methodology ==
Lean LaunchPad pedagogy is said to combine three elements: a Flipped Classroom, Experiential learning, and Team-based learning. During the course, students are said to interview potential customers in order to validate or invalidate their hypotheses, as expressed in the Business Model Canvas. Students are also said to listen to recorded lectures and presentations before each class, and use class time to present what they learned from customer interviews the previous week. Students present their findings which creates the basis for discussion, critiques, and brain-storming by both professors and students.

As of 2021, the Lean LaunchPad has been taught in more than 300 universities worldwide to over 20,000 teams. More than 300,000 people have signed up for a free online version of the class.

== Beyond the classroom ==
The course is considered core to the U.S. National Science Foundation Innovation Corps program.

Two other versions of the class – Hacking for Defense and Hacking for Diplomacy – address national defense and foreign policy challenges. Piloted at Stanford in 2016 by Steve Blank and Joe Felter, these classes connect the Silicon Valley innovation mindset with islands of innovation inside the U.S. Department of Defense, intelligence community and U.S. State Department.

Hacking for Defense immediately began to scale after its pilot in spring 2016. As of 2017, it is taught in more than 15 other universities across the country.
