= Validated learning =

Validated learning is used in scrum. The term was proposed by Eric Ries in 2011. It is a unit of progress process and describes conclusions generated by trying out an initial idea and then measuring it against potential customers to validate the effect. Each test of an idea is a single iteration in a larger process of many iterations whereby something is learnt and then applied to succeeding tests. The term coined in the lean startup scene, but it can be applied universally.

Validated learning is especially popular on the web, where analytics software can track visitor behavior and give accurate statistics and insight on how website features work in reality. Validated learning can, however, be applied to anything; one just needs to be innovative on what to use as metrics.

Typical steps in validated learning:

1. Specify a goal
2. Specify a metric that represents the goal
3. Act to achieve the goal
4. Analyze the metric – did you get closer to the goal?
5. Improve and try again

Phrased in a different way

1. Validate important assumptions fast "Agile Principles: Chapter 3". Addison-Wesley. 2019-06-10.
2. Leverage multiple concurrent learning loops "Post-agile approaches - agile for the real world". Yuval Yeret. 2019-06-10.
3. Organize workflow for fast feedback "How to Use Fast Feedback Loops". Axosoft, LLC. 2019-06-10.

To specify a goal, SMART target finding could apply.

== See also ==
- DMAIC
- Kaizen
- Learning cycle
- Six Sigma
