= Discovery-driven planning =

Method for business growth

Discovery-driven planning is a planning technique first introduced in a Harvard Business Review article by Rita Gunther McGrath and Ian C. MacMillan in 1995.

Gunther and Macmillan argue that it is unhelpful to judge a plan's correctness by how close outcomes come to projections when operating in arenas with significant amounts of uncertainty.

Discovery-driven planning assumes that plan parameters may change as new information is revealed. As opposed to conventional planning where projects are funded upfront, discovery-driven planning releases funding based on the accomplishment of key milestones. Additional funding is made available predicated on reasonable expectations for future success.

Gunther and Macmillan also argue that conventional project management tools such as stage-gate models are not well suited for the uncertainty of innovation-oriented projects.

Discovery-driven planning has been widely used in entrepreneurship curricula and has been cited by Steve Blank as a foundational idea in the lean startup methodology. While the Lean Startup Method is perhaps more suited for start-up ventures, discovery-driven planning may be better suited to potential innovation in larger corporations, where each innovation must achieve significant profits to be material to the corporation's growth.

== Five disciplines ==
A discovery-driven plan incorporates five disciplines or plan elements:

1. Definition of success for the plan or initiative, including a "reverse" income statement
2. Benchmarking against market and competitive parameters
3. Specification of operational requirements
4. Documentation of assumptions
5. Specification of key checkpoints

Using discovery-driven planning, it is often possible to iterate the ideas in a plan, encouraging experimentation at lowest possible cost. The methodology is consistent with the application of real options reasoning to business planning, in which ventures are considered "real" options. A real option is a small investment made today which buys the right, but not the obligation to make further investments.

== See also ==
- Assumption-based planning
- The Innovator's Dilemma
