= Minimum viable product =

Prototype safe for public use

A minimum viable product (MVP) is a version of a product with just enough features to be usable by early customers who can then provide feedback for future product development.

A focus on releasing an MVP means that developers potentially avoid lengthy and (possibly) unnecessary work. Instead, they iterate on working versions and respond to feedback, challenging and validating assumptions about a product's requirements. The term was coined and defined in 2001 by Frank Robinson and then popularized by Steve Blank and Eric Ries. It may also involve carrying out market analysis beforehand. The MVP is analogous to experimentation in the scientific method applied in the context of validating business hypotheses. It is utilized so that prospective entrepreneurs would know whether a given business idea would actually be viable and profitable by testing the assumptions behind a product or business idea. The concept can be used to validate a market need for a product and for incremental developments of an existing product. As it tests a potential business model to customers to see how the market would react, it is especially useful for new/startup companies who are more concerned with finding out where potential business opportunities exist rather than executing a prefabricated, isolated business model.

== Description ==
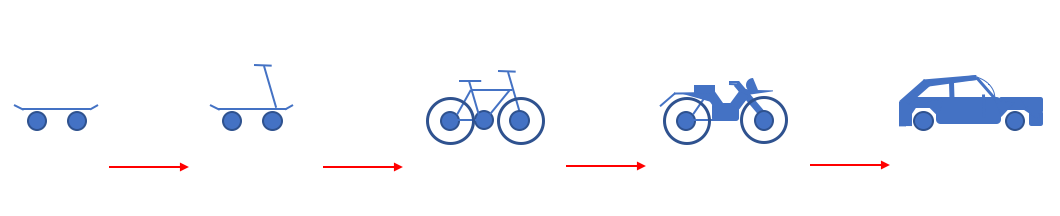
A diagram that illustrates how one can start develop and launch a minimum viable product by implementing at first the most simple, usable product with the most essential functionality.

A minimum viable product has just enough core features to effectively deploy the product, and no more. Developers typically deploy the product to a subset of possible customers, such as early adopters who are thought to be more forgiving, more likely to give feedback, and able to grasp a product vision from an early prototype or marketing information. This strategy aims to avoid building products that customers do not want and seeks to maximize information about the customer with the least money spent. The technique falls under the lean startup methodology as MVPs aim to test business hypotheses and validated learning is one of the five principles of the Lean Startup method. It contrasts strongly with the traditional "stealth mode" method of product development where businesses make detailed business plans spanning a considerable time horizon. Steve Blank posited that the main principle of the Lean Startup approach rests in the validation of the hypotheses underlying the product by asking customers if they want the product or if the product meets their needs, and pivoting to another approach if the hypothesis turns out to be false. This approach to validating business ideas cheaply before substantial investment saves costs and limits risk as businesses that upon experimentation turn out to be commercially unfeasible can easily be terminated. It is especially important as the main cause of startup failure is the lack of market need; that is, many startups fail because their product isn't needed by many people, and so they cannot generate enough revenue to recoup the initial investment. Thus it can be said that utilizing an MVP would illuminate a prospective entrepreneur on the market demand for their products.

For example, in 2015, specialists from the University of Sydney devised the Rippa robot to automate farm and weed management. Before it was released, the technical hypothesis – that the robot can distinguish weeds from farm plants – had already been proven. But the business hypothesis – that it would be a viable tool on a working farm – still needed to be proved. The application of the MVP method here is that the business hypothesis is tested, and only if it proves successful will further development be invested.

"The minimum viable product is that version of a new product a team uses to collect the maximum amount of validated learning about customers with the least effort." The definition's use of the words maximum and minimum means it is not formulaic. It requires judgment to figure out, for any given context, what MVP makes sense. Due to this vagueness, the term MVP is commonly used, either deliberately or unwittingly, to refer to a much broader notion ranging from a rather prototype-like product to a fully-fledged and marketable product.

An MVP can be part of a strategy and process directed toward making and selling a product to customers. It is a core artifact in an iterative process of idea generation, prototyping, presentation, data collection, analysis and learning. One seeks to minimize the total time spent on an iteration. The process is iterated until a desirable product/market fit is obtained, or until the product is deemed non-viable.

=== Testing ===
Testing is the essence of minimum viable products. As described above, an MVP seeks to test out whether an idea works in market environments while using the least possible expenditure. This would be beneficial as it reduces the risk of innovating (so that enormous amounts of capital would not have to be sacrificed before proving that the concept does not actually work), and allowing for gradual, market-tested expansion models such as the real options model. A simple method of testing the financial viability of an idea would be discovery-driven planning, which first tests the financial viability of new ventures by carefully examining the assumptions behind the idea by a reverse income statement (first, begin with the income you want to obtain, then the costs the new invention would take, and see if the required amount of revenue that must be gained for the project to work). Results from a minimum viable product test aim to indicate if the product should be built, to begin with. Testing evaluates if the initial problem or goal is solved in a manner that makes it reasonable to move forward.

Testing an MVP typically involves releasing the product to a limited group of users to gather feedback on functionality, usability, and value. The results are used to guide further development and iteration.

=== Marketing ===
The MVP differs from the conventional market testing strategy of investing time and money early to implement a product before testing it in the market. It is intended to ensure that the market wants the product before large time and monetary investments are made. The MVP differs from the open-source software methodology of release early, release often that listens to users, letting them define the features and future of the product. Instead, the MVP starts with a product vision, which is maintained throughout the product life cycle, although it is adapted based on the explicit and implicit (indirect measures) feedback from potential future customers of the product.

== Criticism ==
Some research has shown that early release of an MVP may hurt a company more than help when companies risk imitation by a competitor and have not established other barriers to imitation. It has also indicated that negative feedback on an MVP can negatively affect a company's reputation. Many developers of mobile and digital products are now criticizing the MVP because customers can easily switch between competing products through platforms (e.g. app stores). Also, products that do not offer the expected minimum standard of quality are inferior to competitors that enter the market with a higher standard.

A notable limitation of the MVP is rooted in its approach that seeks out to test its ideas to the market. Since the business's new product ideas can be inferred from their testing, the method may be unsuited to environments where the protection of the intellectual property is limited (and where products are easily imitated).

The criticism of the MVP approach has led to several new approaches, e.g. the minimum viable experiment MVE, the minimum awesome product MAP, or the simple, lovable, complete.

== See also ==
- Lean startup
- Minimum marketable feature
- Mockup
- Pilot experiment
- Proof of concept
- Startup company
- The Cathedral and the Bazaar
