= Joseph H. Felter III =

American defense official and academic

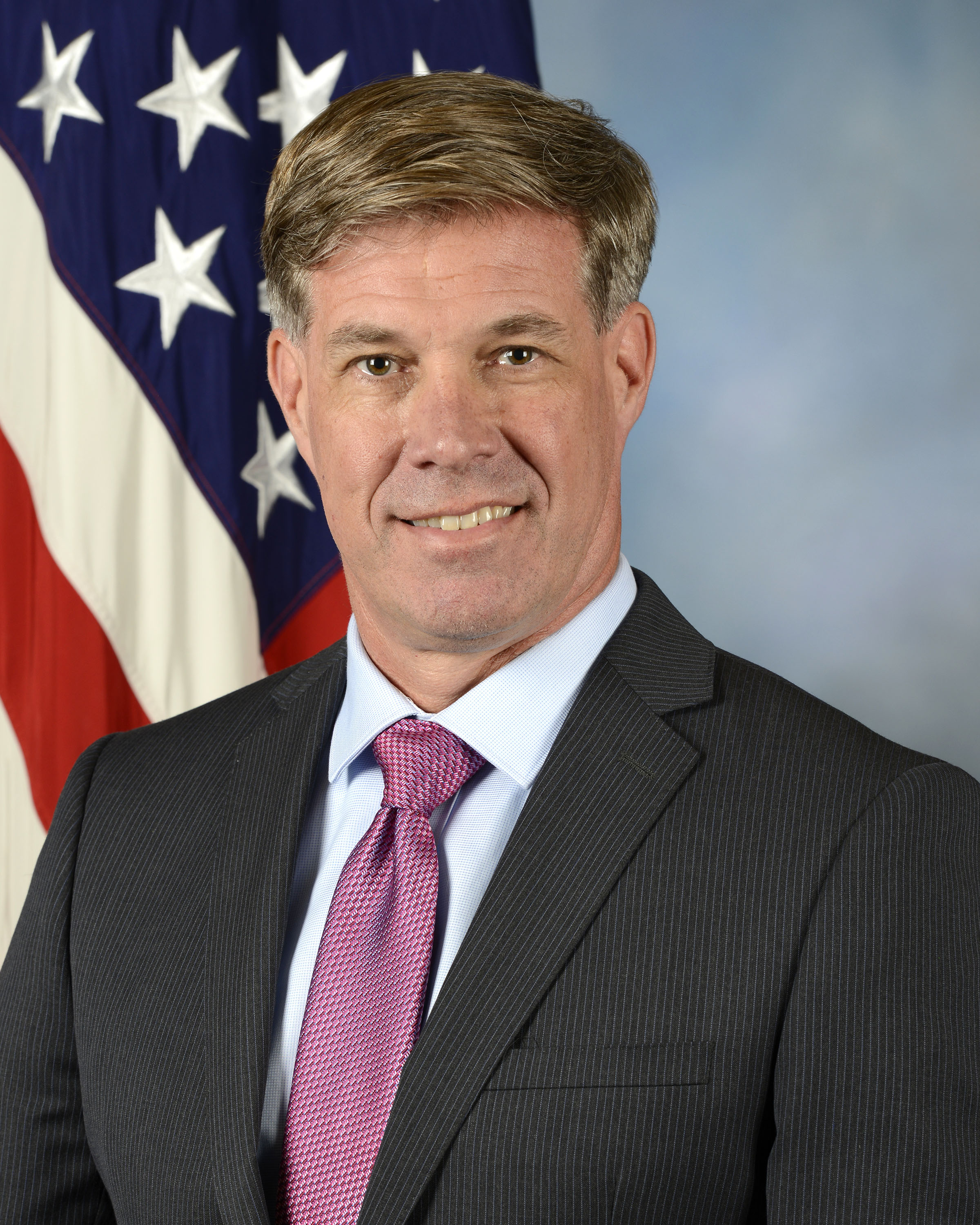
- Felter in 2017

Deputy Assistant Secretary of Defense for South Asia, Southeast Asia, and Oceania
- In office July 2017 – September 2019
- President: Donald J. Trump
- Preceded by: Amy Searight
- Succeeded by: Reed B. Werner

Personal details
- Education: United States Military Academy (BS); Harvard Kennedy School (MPA); Stanford University (PhD)

Military service
- Allegiance: United States
- Branch/service: United States Army
- Years of service: 1987–2012
- Rank: Colonel
- Unit: 3rd Ranger Battalion; 1st Special Forces Group; ISAF; Combating Terrorism Center
- Battles/wars: Operation Just Cause; Operation Iraqi Freedom; Operation Enduring Freedom

Joseph H. Felter III, also known as Joe Felter, is an American political scientist, diplomat and former United States Army Special Forces officer who served as Deputy Assistant Secretary of Defense for South and Southeast Asia and Oceania from 2017 to 2019. He is the founding director of the Gordian Knot Center for National Security Innovation at Stanford University.

== Early life and education ==
Felter graduated from the United States Military Academy in 1987. He earned a Master of Public Administration from the Harvard Kennedy School and a PhD in Political Science from Stanford University. His doctoral thesis, advised by James Fearon, David D. Laitin, and Simon Jackman, was titled Taking Guns to a Knife Fight: A Case for Empirical Study of Counterinsurgency.

== Military career ==
Felter served in the U.S. Army from 1987 to 2012, retiring with the rank of colonel. From 1989 to 1991, he was a platoon leader in the 3rd Ranger Battalion. He participated in the 75th Ranger Regiment's combat parachute assault into Rio Hato Air Base during Operation Just Cause in Panama.

From 1992 to 1996, Felter served as an A-Team leader and company commander in the 1st Battalion, 1st Special Forces Group, conducting foreign internal defense missions in East and Southeast Asia. He later served as the Military Attaché to the Philippines from 1999 to 2002.

From 2005 to 2008, he was the director of the Combating Terrorism Center at West Point. In 2006, he was assigned to the Defense Attaché Office in Kabul, Afghanistan, and later commanded the Counterinsurgency Advisory and Assistance Team (CAAT) for the International Security Assistance Force (ISAF), reporting to Generals Stanley McChrystal and David Petraeus.

== Civilian career ==
=== Academia and research ===
Felter has held academic and research appointments at Columbia University's School of International and Public Affairs, the Hoover Institution, and the Freeman Spogli Institute for International Studies at Stanford University. He co-founded the Empirical Studies of Conflict (ESOC) Project with Jacob N. Shapiro, which compiles open-source conflict datasets. In 2011, he co-founded BMNT, a technology consultancy for national security organizations.

In 2016, Felter and Steve Blank started "Hacking for Defense" at Stanford, an academic curriculum that applied lean launchpad methods to national security problems.

=== Senior Department of Defense Official (2017–2019) ===
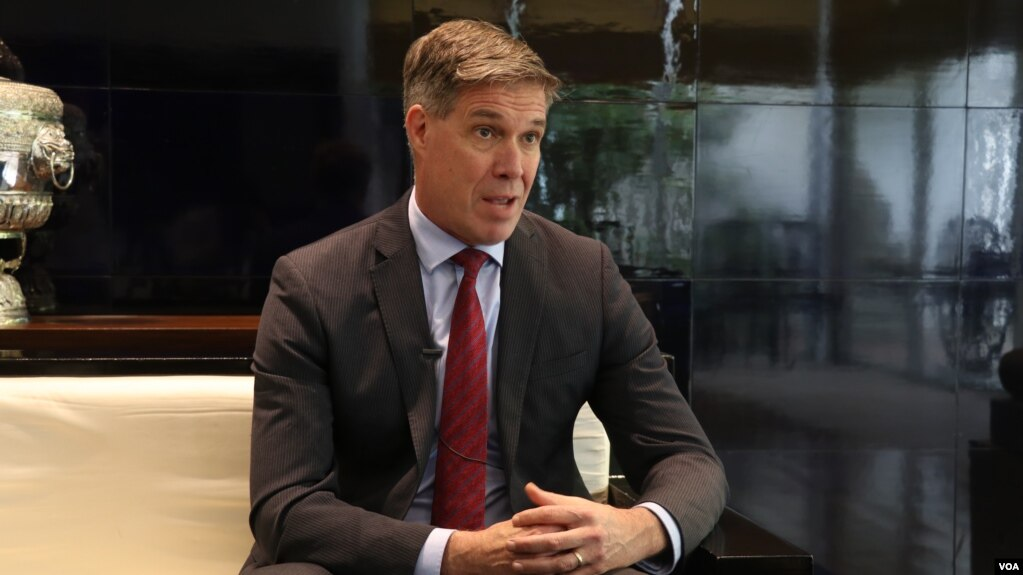
Felter as U.S. Deputy Assistant Secretary of Defense while in Cambodia, 2019.

From 2017 to 2019, Felter served as the Deputy Assistant Secretary of Defense for South Asia, Southeast Asia, and Oceania. His portfolio included the development of defense policy and the management of bilateral security relationships in the region.

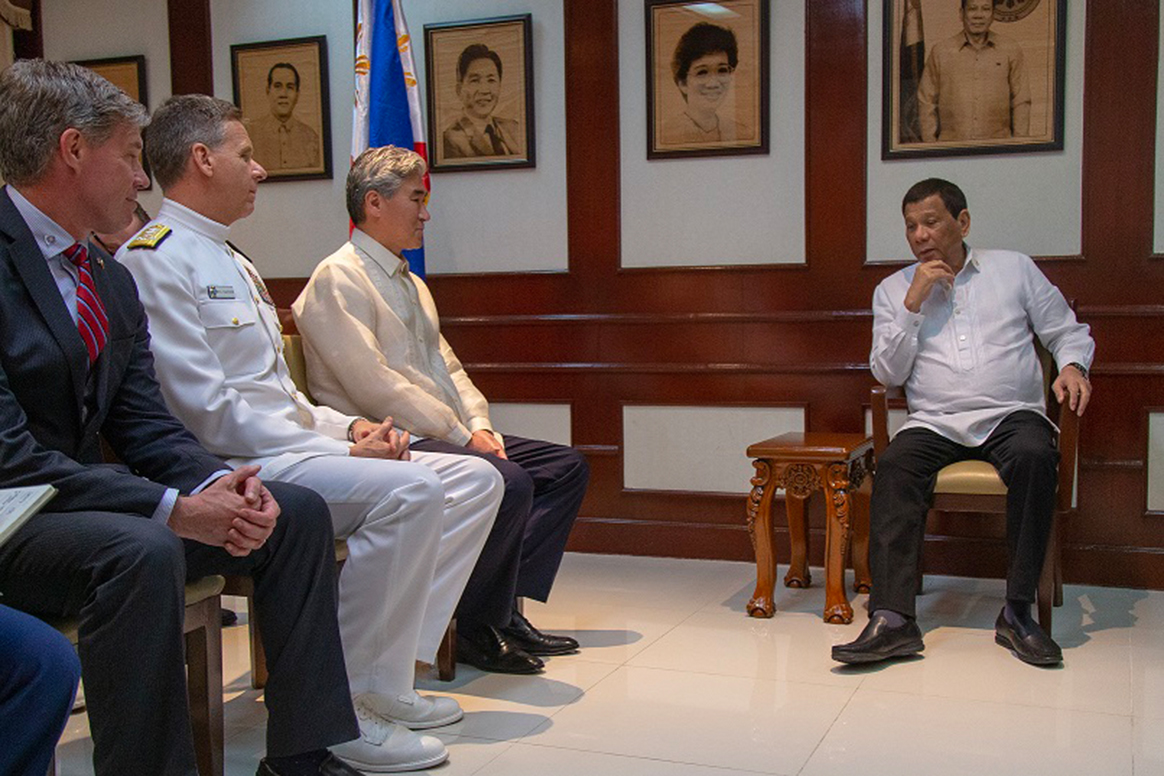
Admiral Philip Davidson, U.S. Ambassador to the Philippines Sung Kim, and Felter meet with President Rodrigo Duterte in Manila, 2018

During this period, Felter was involved in the negotiations to repatriate the Bells of Balangiga to the Philippines. The return of the bells resolved a dispute dating to the Philippine–American War. In December 2018, Felter traveled with the bells to Manila for the handover ceremony with Philippine President Rodrigo Duterte. In 2021, the Senate of the Philippines passed a resolution acknowledging the role of Felter and other U.S. officials in the return.

=== Later work ===
Since 2021, Felter has served as the director of the Gordian Knot Center for National Security Innovation (GKC) at Stanford. He has led organized defense innovation forums such as the INDUS-X conference and Stanford DEFCON. His work in this area has been cited in discussions as part of a growing "mission over money" trend, where students increasingly prioritize high-impact national security careers over traditional private sector roles.

== Publications ==
=== Books ===
- Berman, Eli; Felter, Joseph H.; Shapiro, Jacob N. (2018). Small Wars, Big Data: The Information Revolution and Modern Conflict. Princeton University Press. ISBN 9780691177076.

=== Reports and monographs ===
- Felter, Joseph H.; Fishman, Brian (2008). Iranian Strategy in Iraq: Politics and "Other Means" (Report). Combating Terrorism Center at West Point.
- Felter, Joseph H.; Fishman, Brian (2007). Al-Qa'ida's Foreign Fighters in Iraq: A First Look at the Sinjar Records (Report). Combating Terrorism Center at West Point.

=== Journal articles ===
- Crost, Benjamin; Felter, Joseph H.; Johnston, Patrick (June 2014). "Aid Under Fire: Development Projects and Civil Conflict". American Economic Review. 104 (6): 1833–56. doi:10.1257/aer.104.6.1833.
- Berman, Eli; Shapiro, Jacob N.; Felter, Joseph H. (August 2011). "Can Hearts and Minds Be Bought? The Economics of Counterinsurgency in Iraq". Journal of Political Economy. 119 (4): 766–819. doi:10.1086/661983.
- Berman, Eli; Callen, Michael; Felter, Joseph H.; Shapiro, Jacob N. (August 2011). "Do Working Men Rebel? Insurgency and Unemployment in Afghanistan, Iraq, and the Philippines". Journal of Conflict Resolution. 55 (4): 496–528. doi:10.1177/0022002710393920.
- Crost, Benjamin; Felter, Joseph H.; Mansour, Hani; Rees, Daniel I. (October 2020). "Narrow Incumbent Victories and Post-Election Conflict: Evidence from the Philippines". The World Bank Economic Review. 34 (3): 706–724. doi:10.1093/wber/lhz018.
- Felter, Joseph H.; Shapiro, Jacob N. (Winter 2017). "Limiting Civilian Casualties as Part of a Winning Strategy: The Case of Courageous Restraint". Dædalus. 146 (1): 44–58. doi:10.1162/DAED_a_00422.
- Crost, Benjamin; Duquennois, Claire; Felter, Joseph H.; Rees, Daniel I. (March 2018). "Climate Change, Agricultural Production and Civil Conflict: Evidence from the Philippines". Journal of Environmental Economics and Management. 88: 210–224. doi:10.1016/j.jeem.2018.01.004.
- Drozdova, Katya; Felter, Joseph H. (Fall 2019). "Leaving Afghanistan: Lessons from the Soviet Experience". Journal of Cold War Studies. 21 (4): 31–62. doi:10.1162/jcws_a_00910.
- Berman, Eli; Felter, Joseph H.; Shapiro, Jacob N. (January 2015). "Aid for Peace: Does Money Buy Hearts and Minds?". Foreign Affairs.
