= Incremental funding methodology =

The Incremental Funding Methodology (IFM) is an ROI-informed approach to software development in which software is developed and delivered in carefully prioritized chunks of customer valued functionality. These chunks are known as Minimum Marketable Features (MMFs).

IFM integrates traditional software engineering activities with financially informed project management strategies. IFM heuristics provide clarity into important metrics such as project level NPV, ROI, initial start-up investment costs, and time needed for a project to reach self-funding status. It enables developers, customers, and business stakeholders to answer critical questions related to the development and delivery of a product and to optimize strategies accordingly.

In short, IFM equips developers and project managers with techniques and principles for increasing the financial returns of a software project and for identifying development schedules that make a project financially feasible.

== See also ==
- Minimum viable product
