= Learning cycle =

How people learn from experience

A learning cycle is a concept of how people learn from experience. A learning cycle will have a number of stages or phases, the last of which can be followed by the first.

== John Dewey ==
In 1933 (based on work first published in 1910), John Dewey described five phases or aspects of reflective thought:

In between, as states of thinking, are (1) suggestions, in which the mind leaps forward to a possible solution; (2) an intellectualization of the difficulty or perplexity that has been felt (directly experienced) into a problem to be solved, a question for which the answer must be sought; (3) the use of one suggestion after another as a leading idea, or hypothesis, to initiate and guide observation and other operations in the collection of factual material; (4) the mental elaboration of the idea or supposition as an idea or supposition (reasoning, in the sense in which reasoning is a part, not the whole of inference); and (5) testing the hypothesis by overt or imaginative action.

— John Dewey, How We Think, revised edition, 1933

== Kurt Lewin ==
In the 1940s, Kurt Lewin developed action research and described a cycle of:

1. Planning
2. Action
3. Fact finding, about the result of the action

Lewin particularly highlighted the need for fact finding, which he felt was missing from much of management and social work. He contrasted this to the military where

the attack is pressed home and immediately a reconnaissance plane follows with the one objective of determining as accurately and objectively as possible the new situation. This reconnaissance or fact-finding has four functions. First it should evaluate the action. It shows whether what has been achieved is above or below expectation. Secondly, it gives the planners a chance to learn, that is, to gather new general insight, for instance, regarding the strength and weakness of certain weapons or techniques of action. Thirdly, this fact-finding should serve as a basis for correctly planning the next step. Finally, it serves as a basis for modifying the "overall plan."

— Kurt Lewin, Action Research and Minority Problems, 1946

== Kolb and Fry ==
In the early 1970s, David A. Kolb and Ronald E. Fry developed the experiential learning model (ELM), composed of four elements:

1. Concrete experience
2. Observation of and reflection on that experience
3. Formation of abstract concepts based upon the reflection
4. Testing the new concepts

Testing the new concepts gives concrete experience which can be observed and reflected upon, allowing the cycle to continue.

Kolb integrated this learning cycle with a theory of learning styles, wherein each style prefers two of the four parts of the cycle. The cycle is quadrisected by a horizontal and vertical axis. The vertical axis represents how knowledge can be grasped, through concrete experience or through abstract conceptualization, or by a combination of both. The horizontal axis represents how knowledge is transformed or constructed through reflective observation or active experimentation. These two axes form the four quadrants that can be seen as four stages: concrete experience (CE), reflective observation (RO), abstract conceptualization (AC) and active experimentation (AE) and as four styles of learning: diverging, assimilating, converging and accommodating. The concept of learning styles has been criticised, see Learning styles § Criticism.

== Honey and Mumford ==
In the 1980s, Peter Honey and Alan Mumford developed Kolb and Fry's ideas into a slightly different learning cycle. The stages are:

1. Doing something, having an experience
2. Reflecting on the experience
3. Concluding from the experience, developing a theory
4. Planning the next steps, to apply or test the theory

While the cycle can be entered at any of the four stages, a cycle must be completed to give learning that will change behaviour. The cycle can be performed multiple times to build up layers of learning.

Honey and Mumford gave names (also called learning styles) to the people who prefer to enter the cycle at different stages: Activist, Reflector, Theorist and Pragmatist. Honey and Mumford's learning styles questionnaire has been criticized for poor reliability and validity.

== 5E ==
In the late 1980s, the 5E learning cycle was developed by Biological Sciences Curriculum Study, specifically for use in teaching science. The learning cycle has four phases:

1. Engage, in which a student's interest is captured and the topic is established.
2. Explore, in which the student is allowed to construct knowledge in the topic through facilitated questioning and observation.
3. Explain, in which students are asked to explain what they have discovered, and the instructor leads a discussion of the topic to refine the students' understanding.
4. Extend, in which students are asked to apply what they have learned in different but similar situations, and the instructor guides the students toward the next discussion topic.

The fifth E stands for Evaluate, in which the instructor observes each student's knowledge and understanding, and leads students to assess whether what they have learned is true. Evaluation should take place throughout the cycle, not within its own set phase.

== Launch, Inquire, Act (LIA) Framework ==
The LIA Framework was designed by the Australian Academy of Science's Primary Connections team to address a stated need from surveyed teachers for an online resource that “allows teachers to readily select, adapt and build their own program of work within the framework of Australia’s science curriculum. Coinciding with the continuing uptake of Version 9.0 of the Australian Curriculum in 2024, a new suite of online resources are being developed for Foundation to Year 10 that align with the updated curriculum and with the LIA framework while maintaining more adaptable, clearly framed lessons for teachers during the implementation.

The LIA Framework begins with the “Launch” phase, which was designed to engage students and provide both motivation and context for their learning. The Launch phase encourages students to begin scientific inquiry on a topic through common experiences that connect with their lives (for example, by having students walk into a darkened classroom with all electricity turned off to demonstrate the importance of electricity). This allows all students to develop a common language and provides equity in learning. Next is the “Inquire” phase, which consists of cycles of inquiry, promoting deepening understanding. Students improve their knowledge of a topic via questioning, investigations, and contextual integration (for example, how a torch can be made with a battery, wires, and a bulb: experimenting with different forms of circuits). The last phase, “Act”, aims to empower students to act on their newly acquired knowledge and skills. It encourages students to have agency by designing new ways to interact with the world via science (for example, using their circuitry experiments to design an electrical product to support people in a blackout).

== Alistair Smith ==
In the 1990s, Alistair Smith developed the accelerated learning cycle, also for use in teaching. The phases are:

1. Create the supportive learning environment – safe but stimulating
2. Connect the learning – useful knowledge we already have
3. Give the big picture
4. Describe the learning outcomes we want to achieve
5. Input – new information to enable the activity
6. Activity
7. Demonstrate the findings of the activity
8. Review for recall and retention

Unlike other learning cycles, step 8 is normally followed by step 2, rather than step 1.

== ALACT ==
In the 2000s, Fred Korthagen and Angelo Vasalos (and others) developed the ALACT model, specifically for use in personal development. The five phases of the ALACT cycle are:

1. Action
2. Looking back on the action
3. Aspects of essential awareness
4. Creating alternative methods of action
5. Trial

As with Kolb and Fry, trial is an action that can be looked back on. Korthagen and Vasalos listed coaching interventions for each phase.

=== Levels of reflection ===
Korthagen and Vasalos also described an onion model of "levels of reflection" (from inner to outer: mission, identity, beliefs, competencies, behavior, environment) inspired by Gregory Bateson's hierarchy of logical types. In 2010, they connected their model of reflective learning to the practice of mindfulness and to Otto Scharmer's Theory U, which, in contrast to a learning cycle, emphasizes reflecting on a desired future rather than on past experience.

== See also ==
- Action learning – Type of approach to problem solving
- Action research – Methodology for social science research
  - Participatory action research – Approach to research in social sciences
- Adaptive management – Adaptive environmental assessment and management (AEAM)
- Decision cycle – Sequence of steps for decision-making
  - OODA loop – Observe–orient–decide–act cycle
- Double-loop learning – Learning model
- Improvement cycle
  - DMAIC – Data-driven improvement cycle used for improving and optimizing business processes
  - PDCA – Iterative design and management method
- Inquiry – Any process that has the aim of augmenting knowledge, resolving doubt, or solving a problem
- Intelligence cycle – Stages of intelligence information processing
- Intelligence cycle management – Guiding the intelligence cycle
- Reflective practice § Models
- Tuckman's stages of group development – Model of group development
- Validated learning
