= Theory U =

Change management method started by Otto Scharmer

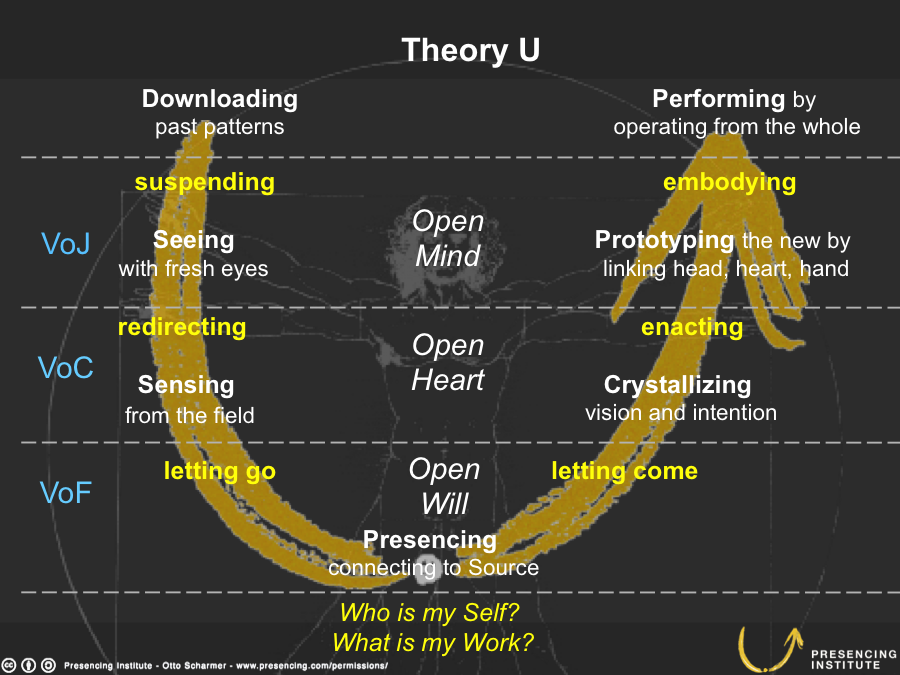
The U Process of Co-sensing and Co-creating — Presencing

Theory U is a change management and organizational learning framework developed by Otto Scharmer, and the title of a book in which he articulated the approach. Scharmer with colleagues at MIT conducted 150 interviews with entrepreneurs and innovators in science, business, and society and then extended the basic principles into a theory of learning and management, which he calls Theory U. The principles of Theory U are suggested to help political leaders, civil servants, and managers break through past unproductive patterns of behavior that prevent them from empathizing with their clients' perspectives and often lock them into ineffective patterns of decision-making.

== Origins and influences ==
Theory U is a framework and method developed by Otto Scharmer through his research at the Massachusetts Institute of Technology (MIT). It is discussed in the academic literature as an experiential and awareness-based approach to systems change, concerned with how attention, perception, and awareness shape individual and collective action.

According to Scharmer, the development of Theory U was influenced by both empirical research and lived experience. He has described his upbringing on a biodynamic farm in northern Germany as formative, particularly his early exposure to soil regeneration practices and the insight that visible outcomes depend on underlying, often invisible conditions. This perspective later informed his concept of the “social field,” referring to the relational and attentional conditions shaping collective behavior and outcomes.

In his writings, Scharmer situates Theory U within traditions of systems thinking, organizational learning, and action research associated with scholars such as Jay Forrester, Donella Meadows, Kurt Lewin, Chris Argyris, Donald Schön, Ed Schein, and Peter Senge. He also draws on philosophical and phenomenological lineages that emphasize first-person experience and participatory knowing, including the work of Francisco Varela, Eleanor Rosch, Edmund Husserl, Martin Heidegger, Friedrich Nietzsche, Rudolf Steiner, and Johann Wolfgang von Goethe.

== Some notes about theory U ==
=== Fields of attention ===
- Thinking (individual)
- Conversing (group)
- Structuring (institutions)
- Ecosystem coordination (global systems)

=== Presencing ===
Scharmer expresses it as a process or journey, which is also described as Presencing, as indicated in the diagram (for which there are numerous variants).

At the core of the "U" theory is presencing: sensing + presence. According to The Learning Exchange, Presencing is a journey with five movements:

We move down one side of the U (connecting us to the world that is outside of our institutional bubble) to the bottom of the U (connecting us to the world that emerges from within) and up the other side of the U (bringing forth the new into the world).

On that journey, at the bottom of the U, lies an inner gate that requires us to drop everything that isn't essential. This process of letting-go (of our old ego and self) and letting-come (our highest future possibility: our Self) establishes a subtle connection to a deeper source of knowing. The essence of presencing is that these two selves – our current self and our best future self – meet at the bottom of the U and begin to listen and resonate with each other. Once a group crosses this threshold, nothing remains the same. Individual members and the group as a whole begin to operate with a heightened level of energy and sense of future possibility. Often they then begin to function as an intentional vehicle for an emerging future.

The core elements are shown below.

1. Co-initiating common intent: Stop and listen to others and to what life calls you to do.	5. Co-evolving through innovations: ecosystems that facilitate seeing and acting from the whole.
2. Co-sensing the field of change: Go to the places of most potential and listen with your mind and heart wide open.	4. Co-creating strategic microcosms: Prototype the new to explore the future by doing.
3. Presencing inspiration and common will: Go to the threshold and allow the inner knowing to emerge.

"Moving down the left side of the U is about opening up and dealing with the resistance of thought, emotion, and will; moving up the right side is about intentionally reintegrating the intelligence of the head, the heart, and the hand in the context of practical applications".

=== Leadership capacities ===
According to Scharmer, a value created by journeying through the "U" is to develop seven essential leadership capacities:

1. Holding the space: listen to what life calls you to do (listen to oneself, to others and make sure that there is space where people can talk)
2. Observing: Attend with your mind wide open (observe without your voice of judgment, effectively suspending past cognitive schema)
3. Sensing: Connect with your heart and facilitate the opening process (i.e. see things as interconnected wholes)
4. Presencing: Connect to the deepest source of your self and will and act from the emerging whole
5. Crystallizing: Access the power of intention (ensure a small group of key people commits itself to the purpose and outcomes of the project)
6. Prototyping: Integrating head, heart, and hand (one should act and learn by doing, avoiding the paralysis of inaction, reactive action, over-analysis, etc.)
7. Performing: Playing the "macro violin" (i.e. find the right leaders, find appropriate social technology to get a multi-stakeholder project going).

The sources of Theory U include interviews with 150 innovators and thought leaders on management and change. Particularly the work of Brian Arthur, Francisco Varela, Peter Senge, Ed Schein, Joseph Jaworski, Arawana Hayashi, Eleanor Rosch, Friedrich Glasl, Martin Buber, Rudolf Steiner and Johann Wolfgang von Goethe have been critical. Today, Theory U constitutes a body of leadership and management praxis drawing from a variety of sources and more than 20 years of elaboration by Scharmer and colleagues. Theory U is translated into 20 languages and is used in change processes worldwide.

Meditation teacher Arawana Hayashi has explained how she considers Theory U relevant to "the feminine principle".

== Earlier work: U-procedure ==
The earlier work by Glasl involved a sociotechnical, Goethean and anthroposophical process involving a few or many co-workers, managers and/or policymakers. It proceeded from phenomenological diagnosis of the present state of the organisation to plans for the future. They described a process in a U formation consisting of three levels (technical and instrumental subsystem, social subsystem and cultural subsystem) and seven stages beginning with the observation of organisational phenomena, workflows, resources etc., and concluding with specific decisions about desired future processes and phenomena. The method draws on the Goethean techniques described by Rudolf Steiner, transforming observations into intuitions and judgements about the present state of the organisation and decisions about the future. The three stages represent explicitly recursive reappraisals at progressively advanced levels of reflective, creative and intuitive insight and (epistemologies), thereby enabling more radically systemic intervention and redesign. The stages are: phenomena – picture (a qualitative metaphoric visual representation) – idea (the organising idea or formative principle) – and judgement (does this fit?). The first three then are reflexively replaced by better alternatives (new idea → new image → new phenomena) to form the design. Glasl published the method in Dutch (1975), German (1975, 1994) and English (1997).

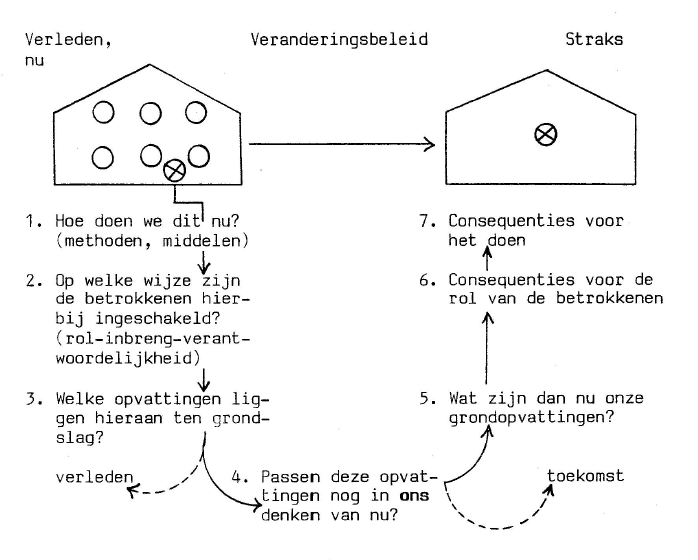
Schematic depiction of U procedure by Glasl, F.

The seven stages are shown below.

Factual/phenomenal level, technical and instrumental subsystem	Observation of phenomena	1. How do processes and workflows function? Instruments, resources.	7. How can processes be developed in future? What phenomena and facts will characterise the organisation of the future?
Imaginative level, social subsystem	Forming a picture of how the organisation works	2. Understanding the social subsystem and how functions, roles and management are distributed.	6. What does that mean for new functions and roles? How should the organisation of the future be visioned?
Inspirational level, cultural subsystem	Ideas	3. Understanding the implicit/actual values, rules and policies that shape the organisation. How and why things happen.	5. What values and guidelines do we want for the future?
		4. Is this what we want?

In contrast to that earlier work on the U procedure, which assumes a set of three subsystems in the organization that need to be analyzed in a specific sequence, Theory U starts from a different epistemological view that is grounded in Varela's approach to neurophenomenology. It focuses on the process of becoming aware and applies to all levels of systems change. Theory U contributed to advancing organizational learning and systems thinking tools towards an awareness-based view of systems change that blends systems thinking with systems sensing. On the left-hand side of the U the process is going through the three main "gestures" of becoming aware that Francisco Varela spelled out in his work (suspension, redirection, letting-go). On the right-hand side of the U this process extends towards actualizing the future that is wanting to emerge (letting come, enacting, embodying).

== Applications and global use ==
Since its introduction, Theory U has been examined and applied across a wide range of contexts related to leadership development, organizational learning, sustainability, and systems-level transformation. Academic literature situates the framework within fields such as futures studies, sustainability transitions, awareness-based action research, and transformative learning, where it is discussed as one approach among others for engaging complex social, ecological, and organizational challenges.

Beyond individual and team-level leadership development, scholars describe the application of Theory U in multi-stakeholder and ecosystem-level initiatives involving public institutions, civil society, businesses, education, finance, faith-based organizations, and landscape-scale sustainability efforts. In these contexts, the framework is discussed as supporting innovation processes, leadership development, participatory governance, collective sense-making, and coordination across institutional and cultural boundaries.

In the field of international development and public-sector innovation, elements of Theory U have been examined in relation to leadership laboratories and action-learning initiatives associated with the United Nations system. Between 2018 and 2024, United Nations SDG Leadership Labs were conducted in 26 countries across Africa, Latin America, and Asia, with the stated aim of strengthening collaboration, innovation capacity, and systemic leadership in support of the Sustainable Development Goals (SDGs). Academic and program evaluations describe these initiatives as drawing on participatory and awareness-based approaches consistent with Theory U principles.

A substantial body of peer-reviewed research further discusses the use of Theory U in areas such as regenerative and landscape-based sustainability initiatives, education and higher learning, mission-driven finance, healthcare, community development, and innovation ecosystems across regions including Europe, Africa, Latin America, Asia-Pacific, and North America. In these studies, Theory U is characterized as a process-oriented framework emphasizing reflective practice, embodied and relational knowing, and the cultivation of collective capacity for adaptive and transformative change.

=== Practice-based and embodied methods ===
Social Presencing Theater (SPT) is a practice-based method associated with Theory U that uses embodied and movement-based approaches to explore social systems and collective dynamics. The method was developed by Arawana Hayashi in collaboration with practitioners and researchers working in awareness-based systems change.

In the academic literature, Social Presencing Theater is described as a way of making social fields perceptible through spatial awareness, gesture, and collective sensing, complementing dialogic and reflective practices used in Theory U–informed change initiatives.

Related visual and arts-based practices, such as generative scribing, are also discussed in the literature as complementary methods that support collective sense-making and reflection in complex, multi-stakeholder contexts.

== Criticism ==
Sociologist Stefan Kühl criticizes Theory U as a management fashion on three main points: First of all, while Theory U posits to create change on all levels, including the level of the individual "self" and the institutional level, case studies mainly focus on clarifying the positions of individuals in groups or teams. Except for the idea of participating in online courses on Theory U, the theory remains silent on how broad organisational or societal changes may take place.

Secondly, Theory U, like many management fashions, neglects structural conflicts of interest, for instance between groups, organisations and class. While it makes sense for top management to emphasize common values, visions and the community of all staff externally, Kühl believes this to be problematic if organisations internally believe too strongly in this community, as this may prevent the articulation of conflicting interests and therefore organisational learning processes.

Finally, the five-phase model of Theory U, like other cyclical (but less esoteric) management models, such as PDCA, are a gross simplification of decision-making processes in organisation that are often wilder, less structured and more complex. Kühl argues that Theory U may be useful as it allows management to make decisions despite unsure knowledge and encourages change, but expects that Theory U will lose its glamour.

== See also ==
- Appreciative inquiry
- Art of Hosting
- Decision cycle
- Learning cycle
- OODA loop
- V-Model
