= The Lean Startup =

Book by Eric Ries

- "The Lean Startup" by Eric Ries – A 2011 book on entrepreneurship.
- Author: Eric Ries
- Language: English
- Genre: Business, non-fiction, Entrepreneurship
- Publisher: Crown Business (USA)
- Publication date: 2011 (USA)
- Publication place: United States
- Media type: Print (hardcover)
- Pages: 336 p. (US hardcover edition)
- ISBN: 0307887898
- OCLC: 770494142

The Lean Startup: How Today's Entrepreneurs Use Continuous Innovation to Create Radically Successful Businesses is a 2011 book by American entrepreneur Eric Ries. It outlines the lean startup methodology, a framework for startup development that prioritizes rapid prototyping, validated learning, and iterative product releases. The goal of this methodology is to shorten product development cycles.

The methodology advocates for building a minimum viable product and gathering user feedback to refine the offering of a product over time. Ries reports developing this approach based on his experiences as a startup advisor and founder, following challenges faced with his first startup.

The lean startup method draws on ideas from lean manufacturing and agile development. It focuses on adapting strategies based on experimentation and user feedback rather than relying on long-term business planning.

== Reception ==
According to the publisher, the book's sales exceeded one million copies, and it has been translated into over thirty languages. It also debuted at #2 on The New York Times Best Sellers list in the 'Hardcover Advice & Misc.' category in 2011.

Some organizations have implemented the lean startup approach, including Alphabet Energy, Dropbox, Wealthfront, and General Electric.

Academic responses to the methodology have been mixed. Ethan Mollick, a professor at the Wharton School of Business, supported the focus on experimentation and learning but raised concerns about the emphasis on early customer input in cases involving novel technologies. He also noted limitations in tools such as the business model canvas. Bocken and Snihur conclude that more research is required to understand the process of experimentation, and highlight the limited academic knowledge of the process.

A 2019 article in The Conversation said it quickly became a foundational work in entrepreneurship classes. The article also summarized three scenarios where the model should not be used: in some industries have such high costs or risks with prototyping, when testing costs outweigh benefits, and when a lack of experience hinders the team's ability to interpret experiments. A 2020 article in the Harvard Business Review said it had become a bible for 'business neophytes'. A 2025 article in The Conversation says the book has been used by 'millions of entrepreneurs around the world.'
