= Eric Ries =

American entrepreneur (born 1978)

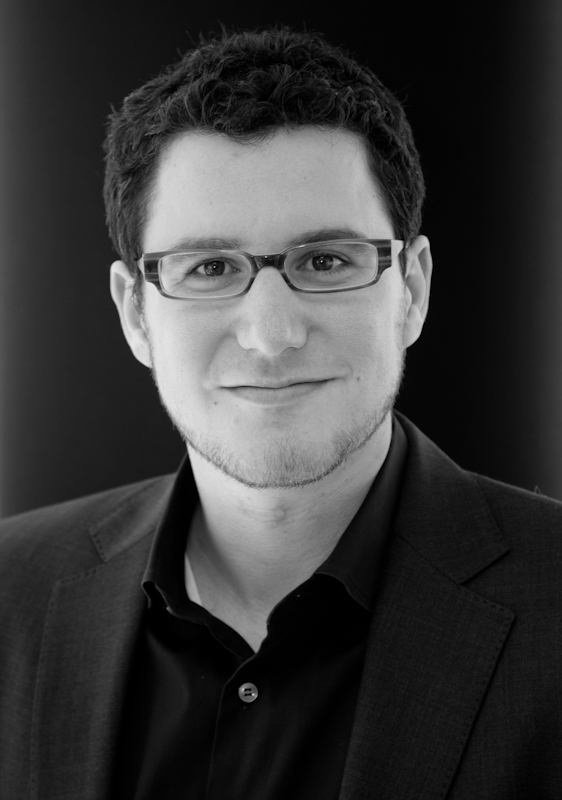
- Eric Ries in 2012
- Born: September 22, 1978 (age 48)
- Education: Yale University
- Occupations: Entrepreneur, blogger, author

Eric Ries (born September 22, 1978) is an American entrepreneur, blogger, and author of The Lean Startup, a book on the lean startup movement. He is also the author of The Startup Way, a book on modern entrepreneurial management.

== Early life ==
In high school he published a book, Black Art of Java Game Programming.

While an undergraduate @ Yale University, Ries co-founded Catalyst Recruiting, an online forum for university students to network with potential employers. The company received funding but ran out of money in the dot-com bust.

== Career ==
=== IMVU ===
After graduating with a BS in computer science, Ries moved to Silicon Valley in 2001 as a software engineer with There, Inc. He worked with the firm until the 2003 launch of its web-based 3D Virtual World product, There.com. The company soon failed.

In 2004, Ries left to join one of the founders of There.com, Will Harvey in co-founding IMVU Inc., a social network. IMVU investor Steve Blank insisted that IMVU executives audit Blank's class on entrepreneurship at UC Berkeley. There Ries picked up Blank's method of fast customer feedback, which Blank called "customer development", and applied it at IMVU in combination with lean software development, testing alternate versions of the product and measuring download rates. IMVU deployed code to production nearly 50 times a day, an unusually rapid development cycle. Ries also copyedited an early version of Blank's book on customer development, The Four Steps to the Epiphany.

IMVU aimed to integrate instant messaging with the high revenue per customer of traditional video games. Ries and Harvey did not seek a large amount of initial funding and released a minimum viable product within six months. In 2006, the firm raised $1 million in its first round of venture fundraising from the Seraph Group, eventually raising an additional 18 million. In 2008 after a new CEO joined IMVU, Ries stepped down as CTO, remaining as a board observer.

=== Lean startup ===
After leaving IMVU, Ries joined venture capital firm Kleiner Perkins as a venture advisor, and six months later started advising startups independently. Based on his experiences, he developed a methodology based on select management principles to help startups succeed. The lean startup methodology originates from a combination of ideas such as lean manufacturing, which seeks to increase value-creating practices and eliminate wasteful practices, and Steve Blank's customer development methodology.

In 2008, Ries began to document the lean startup methodology on his blog with a post titled "The lean startup".

He was invited to speak at the Web 2.0 Expo by Tim O'Reilly, and was offered a position as entrepreneur-in-residence at Harvard Business School. Ries began to devote all of his time to the lean startup movement, and held conferences, gave talks, wrote blog entries, and served as an advisor to companies.

In 2011, he published The Lean Startup which debuted at #2 on The New York Times Best Seller list.

In 2015, he released The Leader's Guide, a self-published version of the curriculum used in his consulting work, exclusively through Kickstarter, raising $588,903 for its publication. In October 2017, he released a follow-up book, The Startup Way, which shows the application of entrepreneurial principles in larger corporate environments. Sales of The Startup Way were not as strong as Ries' preceding book The Lean Startup.

=== Long-Term Stock Exchange ===
In 2015, Ries began organizing The Long-Term Stock Exchange (LTSE), which is building a new US stock exchange that aims to align the interests of companies and long-term investors and improve the public company experience. Ries had proposed the idea of the LTSE in his book The Lean Startup. On November 30, 2018, LTSE filed an application to the Securities and Exchange Commission for registration as a national securities exchange. On May 10, 2019, the Securities and Exchange Commission approved the Long-Term Stock Exchange as a national securities exchange.

== Selected publications ==
- Incorruptible: Why Good Companies Go Bad... and How Great Companies Stay Great. Authors Equity, 2026
- The Startup Way: How Modern Companies Use Entrepreneurial Management to Transform Culture and Drive Long-Term Growth. Currency, 2017.
- The Lean Startup: How Today's Entrepreneurs Use Continuous Innovation to Create Radically Successful Businesses. Currency, 2011.
