= Grockit =

American online social learning game company

Grockit, Inc.
- Company type: Educational Technology
- Industry: Education, Internet
- Founded: 2006
- Defunct: 2016
- Headquarters: San Francisco, CA, USA
- Key people: Rochelle Rothstein: CEO.

Grockit was an online social learning game company. Grockit prepared students for the SAT, ACT, GMAT, LSAT and GRE standardized exams. Students took practice tests while collaborating online with other users. Grockit was founded in 2006 by Farbood Nivi, and in 2013 was acquired by Kaplan, Inc. As of September 2016, the company ceased stand-alone operations.

== Description ==
Grockit was a live online multiplayer game providing test prep. It offered interactive play with other people studying for the same test. It worked to integrate elements of artificial intelligence with its services to adapt to students' unique needs.

Grockit was a play on the word Grok which means to understand something intuitively or by empathy.
