= Rita Gunther McGrath =

American strategic management scholar

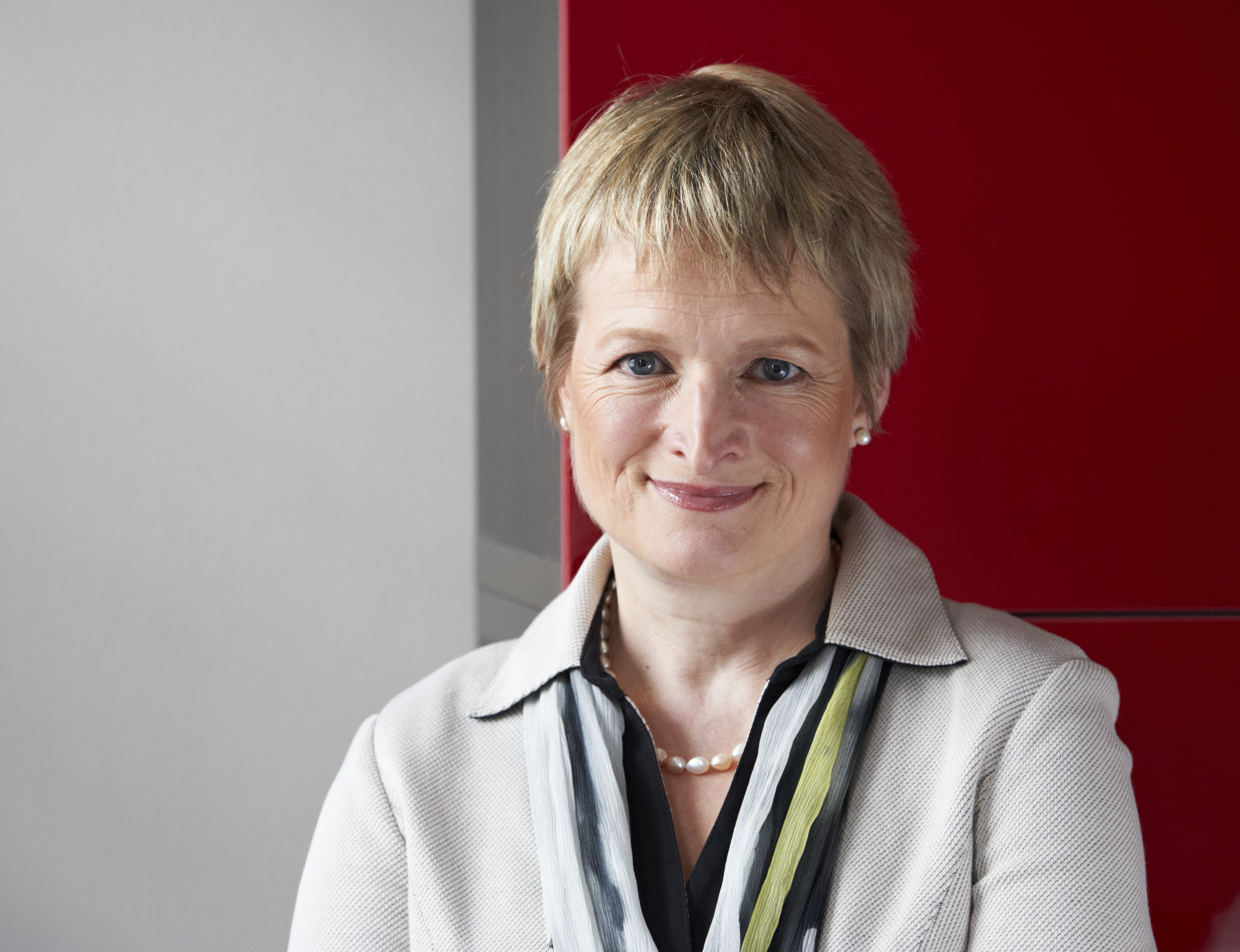
- Born: July 28, 1959 (age 67); New Haven, Connecticut
- Education: Barnard College; Columbia University; The Wharton School
- Scientific career
- Fields: Strategy, innovation and entrepreneurship
- Workplaces: Columbia Business School
- Website: www.ritamcgrath.com

Rita Gunther McGrath (born July 28, 1959, in New Haven, Connecticut) is an Academic Director in Executive Education and professor of management at Columbia Business School with a research interest in strategic management. Her research focuses on innovation and entrepreneurship, including the development of discovery-driven planning.

== Life and work ==
In 1967, McGrath and her family moved from Connecticut to New York. McGrath graduated with a degree in Political Science, with magna cum laude and Phi Beta Kappa honors, from Barnard College in 1981 and earned a Master of Public Administration from the School of International and Public Affairs, Columbia University in 1982. After graduating, McGrath founded two businesses, before accepting a job focused on digital transformation.

In 1993, she completed her Ph.D. at The Wharton School (University of Pennsylvania) with a dissertation entitled Developing New Competence in Established Organizations. Whilst at Wharton, she won the Kauffman Foundation Fellowship in Entrepreneurship and published six peer-reviewed articles.

After graduating in 1993, McGrath joined Columbia as an Assistant Professor of Management. In 1998, she was promoted to Associate Professor of Management, and later, she became a full Professor in the Faculty of Executive Education. In 2009, she was elected Fellow of the Strategic Management Society, and in 2014 she was elected the Deputy Dean of their Fellows.

At Columbia, she directs the course: 'Leading Strategic Growth and Change', as well as guest-lectures in a number of other courses. She is involved in other Columbia initiatives such as the Think Bigger Innovation Hub and custom program offerings.

In 2013, she was elected Fellow of the International Academy of Management. McGrath is also the founder of the innovation platform Valize, and is a regular contributor to the Harvard Business Review and the MIT Sloan Management Review.

== Honors and awards ==
- 2022: C. K. Prahalad award for scholarly impact on practice from the Strategic Management Society
- 2022: Inducted into the Business Excellence Hall of Fame by the Business Excellence Institute
- 2016: Theory to Practice award from the Vienna Strategy Forum
- 2013: Distinguished Achievement Award in Strategy from Thinkers50

== Selected publications ==
=== Books ===
- MacMillan, Ian C. and Rita Gunther McGrath. The entrepreneurial mindset: Strategies for continuously creating opportunity in an age of uncertainty. Vol. 284. Harvard Business School Press, 2000.
- MacMillan, Ian C., and Rita Gunther McGrath. MarketBusters: 40 Strategic Moves That Drive Exceptional Business Growth. Boston: Harvard Business School Press, 2005.
- MacMillan, Ian C. and Rita Gunther McGrath. Discovery Driven Growth: A breakthrough process to reduce risk and seize opportunity. Harvard Business Review Press, 2009.
- McGrath, Rita Gunther. The End of Competitive Advantage: How to Keep Your Strategy Moving as Fast as Your Business. Boston: Harvard Business Review Press, 2013.
- McGrath, Rita Gunther. Seeing Around Corners: How to Spot Inflection Points in Business Before They Happen. Boston: Houghton Mifflin Harcourt, 2019.
