= Otto Scharmer =

German academic

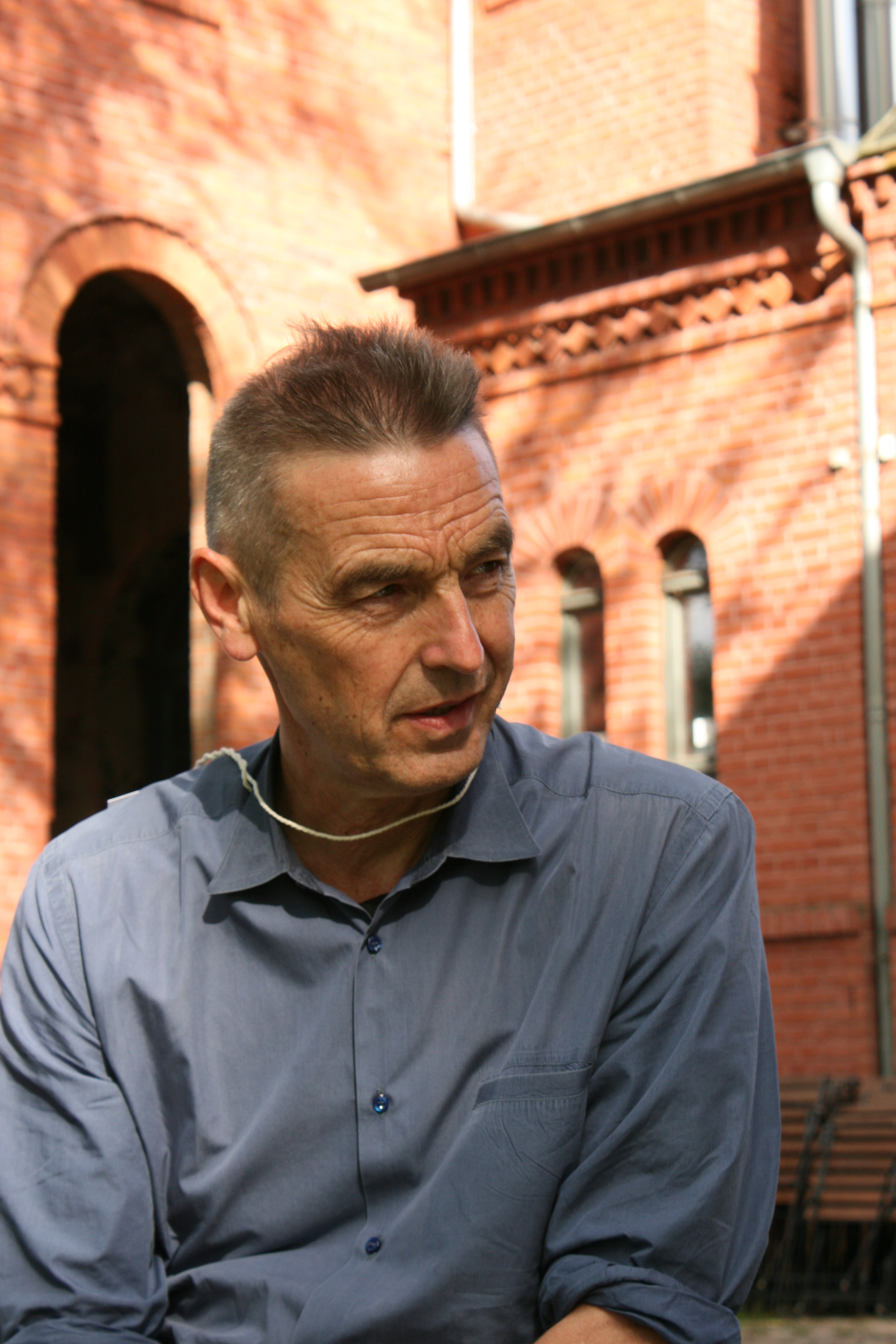
- Otto Scharmer
- Born: 1961 (age 64–65)
- Citizenship: Germany
- Education: Witten/Herdecke University
- Known for: Theory U
- Website: www.ottoscharmer.com

Otto Scharmer (born 1961) is a senior lecturer at the Massachusetts Institute of Technology (MIT) and co-founder of the Presencing Institute and its u-school for Transformation. He focuses on awareness-based action research with leaders across various sectors, anchored in the concept of presencing, a method of "learning from the emerging future", which he introduced in his books Theory U (2007) and Presence (2004, co-authored with Peter Senge and others).

== Early life and education ==
Otto Scharmer was born and raised near Hamburg, Germany, where his experiences on his family's farm significantly influenced his future work. The principles of regenerative farming, as practiced by his father, laid the foundation for Scharmer's later concepts of social fields and systems change. Scharmer has later described his upbringing on the family’s biodynamic farm in northern Germany as formative for his thinking. His father was among the early adopters of biodynamic agriculture in Germany, a practice rooted in regenerative-organic principles and Goethean observation, which emphasizes attentiveness to living systems and the formative role of underlying conditions. Scharmer has linked these early experiences to his later interest in how invisible factors such as attention, relationships, and awareness shape outcomes in social and organizational systems, an idea he later articulated through the concept of the social field. Scharmer earned his diploma and PhD in economics from Witten/Herdecke University.

== Career ==
Throughout his career, Scharmer has focused on cross-sector systems transformation, introducing the concept of presencing in his books Theory U (2007, 2nd edition 2016), Presence: Exploring Profound Change in People, Organizations, and Society (2004, co-authored with Peter Senge and others) and Presencing: 7 Practices for Transforming Self, Society, and Business (2025 Penguin, co-authored with Katrin Kaufer. In Leading from the Emerging Future (2013, co-authored with Katrin Kaufer), Scharmer explored the transition from egocentric to ecocentric economic systems, identifying key leverage points for systemic change.

Scharmer co-founded the MITx u-lab, a platform that has engaged over 250,000 participants from 186 countries in transformational learning and change initiatives as of 2024. His work extends to designing action learning labs for United Nations agencies and Sustainable Development Goals (SDG) leadership labs for UN country teams in 26 countries, aiming to foster cross-sector collaboration in addressing global challenges. He serves as a consulting editor for the Journal of Awareness-Based Systems Change, a peer-reviewed open access journal focusing on the integration of research and practice in awareness-based systems change. Scharmer is a member of the Club of Rome and has served as a councilor of the World Future Council since 2019.

=== Research and global practice ===
In addition to his academic teaching and writing, Scharmer has been involved in applied research and leadership development initiatives across public, private, and civil society sectors. His work in this area has focused on action research, participatory learning processes, and cross-sector collaboration aimed at addressing complex societal challenges.

Between 2018 and 2023, United Nations SDG Leadership Labs were conducted with United Nations Country Teams and Humanitarian Country Teams in 26 countries, including Angola, Burundi, Cameroon, Costa Rica, Ecuador, Honduras, Kenya, Liberia, Madagascar, and Rwanda. The program was commissioned by the United Nations Development Coordination Office and funded by the Dutch Government and later by the United States Agency for International Development (USAID), with the objective of strengthening systemic leadership, collaboration, and innovation capacity in support of the Sustainable Development Goals (SDGs).

According to program documentation and evaluation reports, the SDG Leadership Labs employed action-learning approaches informed by Theory U and presencing practices, emphasizing experimentation through prototyping, reflective learning, and ecosystem-level collaboration across institutional boundaries.

== Theory U ==
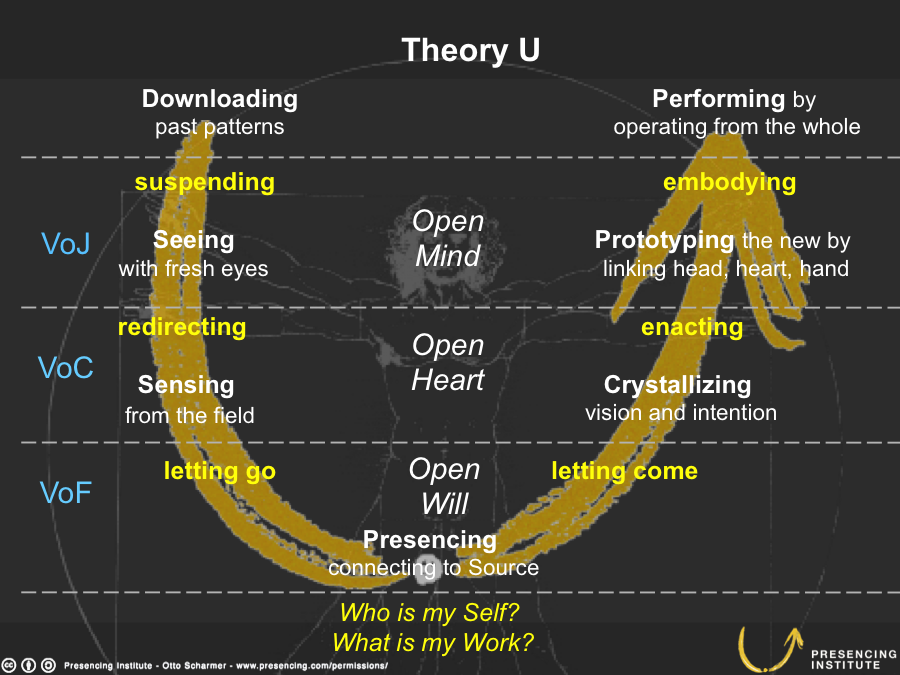
The U Process of Co-sensing and Co-creating — Presencing

Theory U is a change management and organizational learning framework developed by Otto Scharmer, and the title of a book in which he articulated the approach. Scharmer with colleagues at MIT conducted 150 interviews with entrepreneurs and innovators in science, business, and society and then extended the basic principles into a theory of learning and management, which he calls Theory U. The principles of Theory U are suggested to help political leaders, civil servants, and managers break through past unproductive patterns of behavior that prevent them from empathizing with their clients' perspectives and often lock them into ineffective patterns of decision-making.

In academic discussions, Theory U has also been described as an awareness-based form of action research that integrates inner, experiential dimensions of learning with organizational and societal change processes. Scholars situate the framework within broader traditions of systems thinking, phenomenology, and neurophenomenology, highlighting its emphasis on perception, presence, and the interior condition of the practitioner in enabling transformation.

== Awards and honors ==
He received the Jamieson Prize for Excellence in Teaching at MIT (2015), and the EU Leonardo Corporate Learning Award for the contributions of Theory U to the future of management (2016). In 2021, he received the Elevating Humanity Award from the Organizational Development Network.

== Selected publications ==
- Scharmer, Otto; Käufer, Katrin (2025). Presencing: 7 Practices for Transforming Self, Society, and Business (1st ed.). San Francisco: Berrett-Koehler (published April 15, 2025). ISBN 979-8890570284.
- Senge, Peter M.; Scharmer, Claus Otto; Jaworski, Joseph; Flowers, Betty Sue (2004). Presence: Exploring Profound Change in People, Organizations, and Society (1st ed.). New York: Currency/Doubleday. ISBN 038551624X. OCLC 61257585.
- Scharmer, Otto; Käufer, Katrin (2013). Leading from the Emerging Future: From Ego-system to Eco-system Economies (1st ed.). San Francisco: Berrett-Koehler. ISBN 9781605099262. OCLC 813920439.
- Scharmer, Claus Otto (2016) [2007]. Theory U: Leading from the Emerging Future. A BK business book (2nd ed.). San Francisco: Berrett-Koehler. ISBN 9781626567986. OCLC 944179658.
- Scharmer, Claus Otto (2018). The Essentials of Theory U: Core Principles and Applications. San Francisco: Berret-Koehler. ISBN 9781523094400. OCLC 987657070.
