= Steve Blank =

American businessman (born 1953)

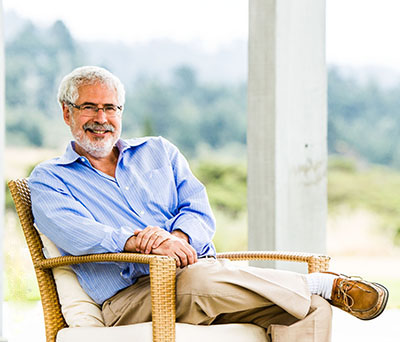
- Born: 1953 (age 72–73); New York City
- Occupation: Entrepreneur
- Known for: Customer development Methodology
- Military career
- Allegiance: United States
- Branch: United States Air Force
- Conflicts: Vietnam War

Steve Blank (born 1953) is an American entrepreneur, educator, author and speaker. He created the customer development method that launched the lean startup movement. His work has influenced modern entrepreneurship through the creation of tools and processes for new ventures which differ from those used in large companies.

Between 1978 and 2002, Blank worked at eight different technology startups, founding, or co-founding, four of them.

Blank created the Lean Launchpad class and I-Corps curriculum which became the standard for science commercialization for the National Science Foundation, the National Institutes of Health and the U.S. Department of Energy. As of 2023, more than 3,051 teams and 1,300 startups have employed Blank's methodologies.

Blank is co-creator of the U.S. Department of Defense's Hacking for Defense program, and served on the Defense Business Board and the U.S. Navy's Science and Technological Board. He is co-creator of the Gordian Knot Center for National Security Innovation at Stanford University.

== Early life, education and military service ==
Blank was born to Jewish immigrant parents in the Chelsea neighborhood in New York City. He attended the University of Michigan for one semester. Blank spent four years in the U.S. Air Force during the Vietnam War. While serving in the Air Force, Blank was stationed in three different bases in Thailand maintaining and repairing electronic warfare and electronic intelligence systems on F-105G, F-4, and A-7 aircraft. He then returned to the U.S. to work on B-52 bombers in Oscoda, Michigan.

== Entrepreneurial career ==
Blank's first job in Silicon Valley was as an instructor in the training department of Electromagnetic Systems Laboratory (ESL), a unit of TRW. ESL was founded by William Perry. The company helped the government understand the Soviets' technological and arms developments during the Cold War.

Blank spent the next two decades in the high tech industry founding, or as part of eight startups in a variety of advanced technologies including Zilog and MIPS Computers, Convergent Technologies, Ardent, SuperMac Technologies, and Rocket Science Games.

Blank co-founded his last startup, the customer relationship management (CRM) provider E.piphany, in 1996 and retired the day before its IPO in September 1999.

== Academic teaching career ==
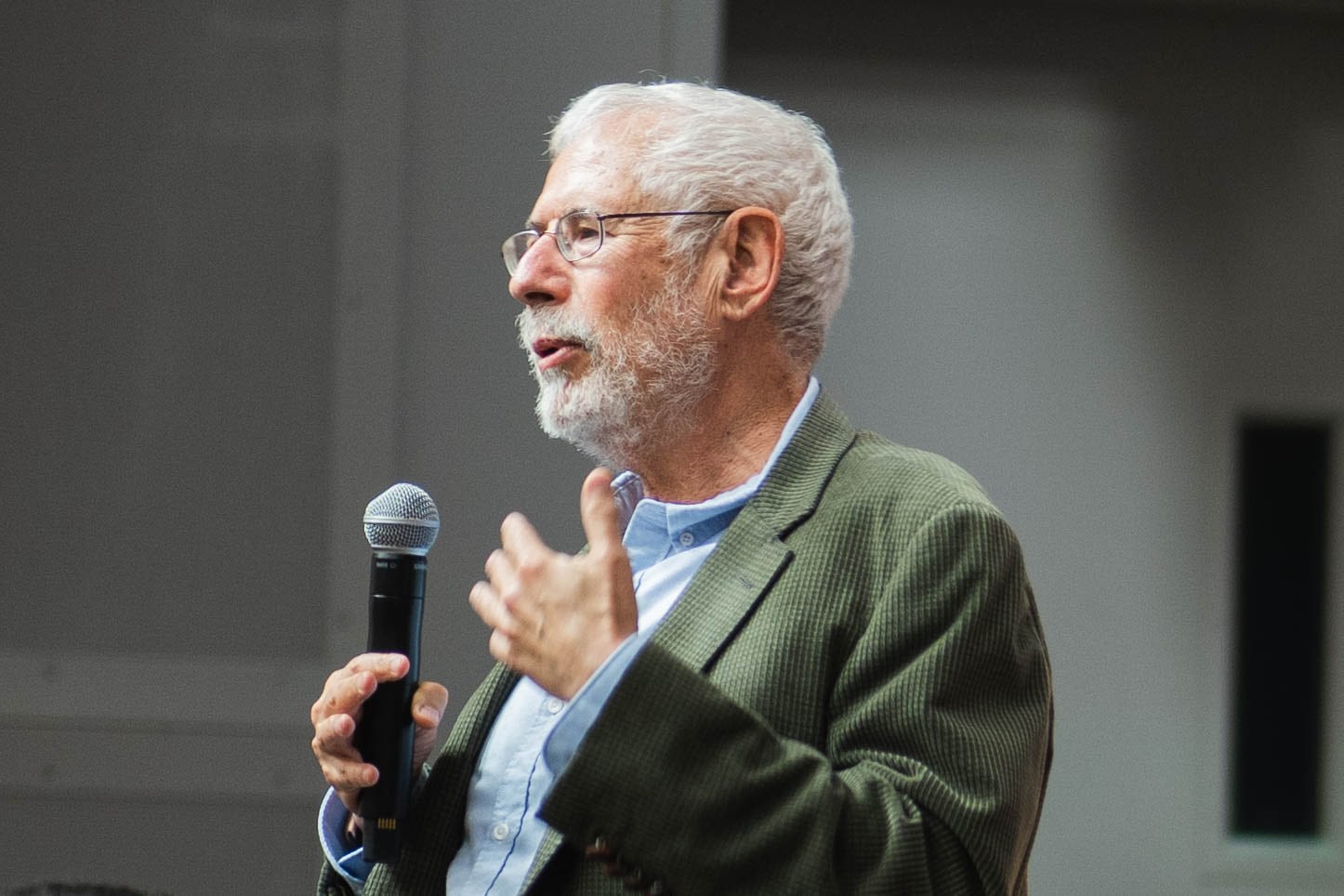
Steve Blank giving a lecture at Stanford University in 2024.

In 2001, Blank was invited to lecture at U.C. Berkeley as part of the Lester Center for Entrepreneurship at the Haas School of Business. He went on to teach a class on Customer Development at the school from 2003 through 2017. He began teaching at Stanford University's Engineering School in the Technology Ventures Program in 2004.

In January 2011, Blank created the Lean LaunchPad class at Stanford University. The class combined experiential learning with the three building blocks of a successful lean startup: Alexander Osterwalder's Business Model Canvas, Blank's customer development model, and Agile Engineering. Rather than relying on the traditional business school practice of teaching students how to write a standard business plan, or simply build a product, the Lean Launchpad course assumed that all the students have a series of untested hypotheses about a venture and need to get out of the classroom to validate them.

In 2012 Blank collaborated with the National Science Foundation and Venturewell to create educator courses and training material for NSF and Lean LaunchPad Instructors. From 2012 to 2021 he concurrently taught the Lean Launchpad class at Columbia University.

Blank partnered with University of California, San Francisco and the National Science Foundation in 2013 to offer the Lean LaunchPad class for Life Science and Healthcare (therapeutics, diagnostics, devices and digital health.) In 2014, in conjunction with the National Institute of Health, Blank took the UCSF curriculum and developed the I-Corps@NIH program.

Blank and Joe Felter co-created Hacking for Defense and Hacking for Diplomacy courses at Stanford University in 2016. He went on to apply the same customer development approach to large social and environmental problems with courses including Hacking for Oceans, Climate and Hacking for Impact in 2022. Both the Lean LaunchPad and Hacking for Defense curricula uses the customer development methodology and lean startup methods developed by Blank during his career as a serial entrepreneur.

Blank collaborated with the Common Mission Project in 2019 to host the Lean Innovation Educators Conference. The event drew educators from universities around the world to share best practices for teaching entrepreneurship.

In 2020, Blank co-created the "Technology, Innovation and Modern War" class at Stanford University's Center for International Security and Cooperation (CISAC). with Joe Felter and Raj Shah. The class discusses how technology driven by commercial technology can create new military systems and concepts for future conflicts. In 2021 the class was expanded and renamed "Technology, Innovation and Great Power Competition." Later that year Blank and Felter co-founded the Stanford Gordian Knot Center for National Security Innovation.

Blank co-created the Wicked Problems, Systems Dynamics, and Entrepreneurial Innovation class as a summer course at Imperial College in London in 2023.

== Philosophy and work ==
=== Customer development methodology and Lean Startup movement ===
Blank began to develop the customer development methodology in the mid-1990s

Customer Development assumes that early ventures have untested hypotheses about their business model. Customer development starts with the insight that there are no facts inside your building so entrepreneurs need to get outside to find, test and validate them.

The hypotheses testing emulates the scientific method – pose a business model hypothesis, design an experiment, get out of the building and test it. Take the data and derive some insight to either (1) Validate the hypothesis, (2) Invalidate the Hypothesis, or (3) Modify the hypothesis.

Blank's Customer Development methodology has been popularized by Eric Ries. Blank refined the ideas around 2004 when he was an investor and advisor to IMVU, a company co-founded by Ries. Ries had observed that Customer Development was a natural pair to the Agile Development method that engineers were employing.

The lean startup has been adopted by entrepreneurs worldwide as an efficient and repeatable way to search for product/market fit. Reis has integrated the customer development methodology into the lean startup practices and considers it to be one of the lean startup movement's pillars. Blank's version of the Lean Methodology includes Customer Development, Agile Engineering and added the Business Model Canvas developed by Alexander Osterwalder.

=== Lean LaunchPad and the I-Corps (Innovation Corps) ===
In July 2011 the National Science Foundation (NSF) asked Blank to adapt his Lean LaunchPad class to help scientists who were applying for an SBIR grant learn how to commercialize their academic inventions. The NSF later adopted Blank's Stanford class and renamed it the Innovation Corps (I-Corps). The course became the standard for science commercialization, serving as the syllabus of I-Corps at the National Science Foundation Innovation Corps, National Institutes of Health (NIH), and the United States Department of Energy (DOE). The methodology is taught at 100 universities and has been employed to drive innovation within agencies of the United States government.

As of 2023, the I-Corps program has been used to train more than 9,330 scientists and engineers within the NSF, NIH, and the DOE. Nearly 1400 I-Corps teams at the NSF have launched startups raising more than $3.166 billion. Over 300 I-Corps teams at NIH have collectively raised $634 million. DOE I-Corps teams have raised roughly $151 million in additional funding.

=== Mission-driven Entrepreneurship ===
In 2016, Blank along with Peter Newell, and Joe Felter co-created a series of mission-driven entrepreneurship classes at Stanford based on Blank's Lean Launchpad class. The course, "Hacking for Defense," teaches students to work with Defense and Intelligence communities on national security problems and develop solutions using the Lean Startup method. The course allows students to serve their country in a nontraditional way. As of 2021 the course was offered in 47 universities in the U.S. including the U.S. Military Academy at West Point, the U.S. Air Force Academy, Defense Acquisition University and the Naval Postgraduate School. The course has also been adopted by the U.S. Department of Defense and is offered through the National Security Innovation Network as well as in Australia and the UK.

In response to a request from the U.S. Department of State, Blank, along with Stanford professor Jeremy Weinstein and U.S. State Department representative to Silicon Valley Zvika Krieger, co-created "Hacking For Diplomacy."

Other mission-driven courses followed including "Hacking for Oceans," and "Hacking for Local." In the midst of the 2020 COVID-19 pandemic Blank created a series of classes called "Hacking for Recovery" to help business adapt their business models in the crisis. The class was subsequently adopted by the State of Hawaii.

== Defense and national security ==
In 2009, Blank began delivering a lecture titled “The Secret History of Silicon Valley” to explain how the U.S. Department of Defense and the broader intelligence community accidentally created the entrepreneurial ecosystem in Silicon Valley. [

Blank, along with Joe Felter and Raj Shah, founded the Gordian Knot Center for National Security Innovation at Stanford University in 2021. Funded by the U.S. Navy's Office of Naval Research (ONR), the center connects defense, commercial, and academic organizations.

== Public service and philanthropy ==
Blank joined the Audubon California Board of Directors in 2000, serving as chairman from 2005 until 2010.

Blank made a $1 million donation to the Peninsula Open Space Trust in 2004. He later served on the board from 2007 to 2011. During that same period he served as a trustee of University of California, Santa Cruz foundation.

In 2007 he was appointed to the California Coastal Commission and served until 2013. He has also served on the board of the California League of Conservation Voters.

Blank served as a member of the Defense Business Board in 2020. In 2023 he was appointed to the United States Department of the Navy's Science and Technology Advisory board, heading the Innovation Group.

== Personal life ==
Blank has given commencement addresses at Philadelphia University (2011), University of Minnesota (2013), ESADE Business School in Barcelona (2014), New York University Engineering School (2016), Dalhousie University (2017) and UC Santa Cruz (2019).

Blank hosted the SiriusXM radio show “Entrepreneurs are Everywhere'' in 2015.

== Awards and honors ==
- 2009 Silicon Valley Mercury News Top 10 Influencers in Silicon Valley
- 2010 University of California, Berkeley Haas School of Business, Earl F. Cheit Award for Excellence in Teaching,
- 2011 Philadelphia University, Doctor of Humane Letters (honorary)
- 2012 The Harvard Business Review "One of 12 Masters of Innovation"
- 2012 CNBC "11 Notable Entrepreneurs Teaching the Next Generation"
- 2013 SVForum Visionary Award
- 2014 National Science Foundation and the NCIIA Outstanding Leadership Award
- 2015 Columbia University Senior Fellow for Entrepreneurship
- 2015 The Thinkers50 global ranking of management thinkers
- 2016 New York University Tandon School of Engineering, Polytechnic Medal
- 2017 Columbia University Senior Fellow for Entrepreneurship
- 2019 U.S. Association for Small Business and Entrepreneurship (USASBE) 2019 John E. Hughes Award for Entrepreneurial Achievement
- 2021 United States Congress, Congressional Honors
- 2023 Stanford University department of Management Science and Engineering, Graduate Teaching Award

== Bibliography ==
=== Books ===
- Blank, Steve (2005) The Four Steps to the Epiphany: Successful Strategies for Products that Win, Wiley, ISBN 978-1119690351
- Blank, Steve (2010) Not All Those Who Wander Are Lost, Cafepress, ISBN 978-0976470748
- Blank, Steve; Bob Dorf (2012) The Startup Owner's Manual, Wiley, ISBN 978-1119690689
- Blank, Steve (2014) Holding a Cat by the Tail, K&S Ranch Publishing, ISBN 978-0989200554

=== Selected publications ===
- Blank, Steve. (2011) Embrace failure to start up success, Nature, doi:10.1038/477133a
- Blank, Steve. (May 2013) Why the lean start up changes everything, Harvard Business Review
- Blank, Steve. (September 2017) What your innovation process should look like, Harvard Business Review
- Blank, Steve. (November–December 2017) When founders go too far, Harvard Business Review
- Blank, Steve. (February 2019) McKinsey’s three horizon model defined innovation for years. Here’s why it no longer applies, Harvard Business Review
- Blank, Steve. (April 2019) How to Make Startup Stock Options a Better Deal For Employees, Harvard Business Review
- Blank, Steve. (September 2019) AgileFall - When Waterfall Principles Sneak Back Into Agile Workflows, Harvard Business Review
- Blank, Steve. (October 2019) Why companies do innovation theater instead of actual innovation, Harvard Business Review
- Blank, Steve. (2020) A 5-Day Plan to Keep Your Company Afloat, Harvard Business Review
- Blank, Steve. (2022) The Small, the Agile, and the Many, Proceedings
- Blank, Steve. (2022) Entrepreneurs, Is a Venture Studio Right for You?, Harvard Business Review
- Blank, Steve; Felter Joe; Shah, Raj. (2022) The U.S. must harness the power of Silicon Valley to spur military innovation, Tech Crunch
