= Market Opportunity Navigator =

Strategic management methodology

The Market Opportunity Navigator (MON) is a methodology in strategic management that aims to help innovators and entrepreneurs identify and select the most valuable market opportunity to pursue current and future resources and capabilities. It was added as the fourth tool in the lean startup toolset and can be used with the Business Model Canvas developed by Alexander Osterwalder and Yves Pigneur and the Minimum Viable Product.

MON was developed by German management researcher Marc Gruber and Israeli entrepreneurship specialist Sharon Tal as a strategic framework to help firms identify and capitalize on promising market opportunities based on their studies of hundreds of startups. It consists of three steps: generating the Market Opportunity Set, evaluating Market Opportunity Attractiveness, and designing the Agile Focus Strategy. Through these steps, the MON assists in understanding a firm's core abilities, assessing the attractiveness of potential market opportunities, and strategically planning for growth while remaining agile in a dynamic market environment. MON guides decision-making processes, fosters a shared language within organizations, and offers ongoing guidance for pursuing valuable market domains.

== Overview and background ==
The idea that the resources and capabilities of a new firm can be applied to create different offerings and address the needs of different market segments was first spelled out in Edith Penrose's influential "Theory of the Growth of the Firm," and since then has become a cornerstone of the resource-based view in strategic management. Contemporary writings seek to forge a link between the lean startup and academic research, including MON.

MON was developed based on insights from several research studies as well as practical work with startups and established firms. Most closely related to the origins of the method are four academic studies. For instance, a research study of over 80 startups found that experienced entrepreneurs tend to generate a set of market opportunities before deciding which market to pursue initially, deriving key performance benefits from doing so. A study of 500 technology ventures showed that the number of identified market opportunities and the variance (distance) among them have a lasting impact on the growth potential of the firm over time and its likelihood of subsequent diversification.

Where to Play: 3 steps for discovering your most valuable market opportunities
- Cover
- Author: Marc Gruber and Sharon Tal
- Language: English
- Subject: Entrepreneurship, market strategy
- Genre: Non-fiction
- Publisher: FT Publishing International
- Publication date: September 21, 2017
- Pages: 240
- ISBN: 978-1-292-17892-9 ISBN-13
- The book was also published in German, French, Chinese, and Korean.

Gruber and Tal worked on the concept for years before bundling and presenting it in their book "Where To Play: 3 Steps For Discovering Your Most Valuable Market Opportunities" (Pearson, 2007). In the book, Gruber and Tal present MON as a template and a framework tailored for entrepreneurs, technology transfer offices (TTOs), startups, established organizations, and educators. MON was developed to help decision-makers overcome the challenge of commercializing innovative ideas. The authors argue that for innovators the concept of speed or running fast is critical to successful product development and marketing and that the biggest mistake is to run fast in the wrong direction (i.e., not pursuing the most valuable market opportunity). The set of unique resources and skills of an innovator creates multiple potential paths of different products that can solve different problems, addressing different needs for a wide variety of customers. And opportunities with bigger value-generating potential would generate more sales and maximize the chances of success in a given market.

In Entrepreneurial Strategy: Starting, Managing, and Scaling New Ventures (Shepherd & Patzelt, 2021), MON is described as a critical tool for helping entrepreneurs identify and evaluate market opportunities during the startup process. It is positioned as a complement to the Lean Startup framework, specifically addressing the gap left by tools like the Business Model Canvas and Minimum Viable Product.

Stevenson et al. (2024) mention MON as one of the core tools within the lean start-up framework, alongside others like the Business Model Canvas and iterative customer development procedures. These tools facilitate entrepreneurial progress by helping innovators test and explore market opportunities. Specifically, MOP is recognized for its role in identifying and evaluating potential market opportunities, which aligns with the framework's goal of guiding entrepreneurs in the iterative process of developing and testing a venture.

Saras D. Sarasvathy (2024) described MON as an essential addition to lean startup methods. MON, she said, addresses a key gap in lean startup by offering a broad framework that helps entrepreneurs generate and evaluate a portfolio of market opportunities. Sarasvathy wrote:

MON offers a wide lens perspective for entrepreneurs to come up with a portfolio of market ideas, and then helps them to choose the one with highest potential as the starting point for applying lean startup.

== Principles ==
The resources and capabilities of a (new) firm can be applied to create different offerings and address the needs of different market segments. The choice of which markets to focus on is critical for firm growth and has an important imprinting effect on the business. MON proposes a structured process to support managers, entrepreneurs, and innovators in discovering their most valuable market opportunities and set their strategic focus. It is based on three steps:

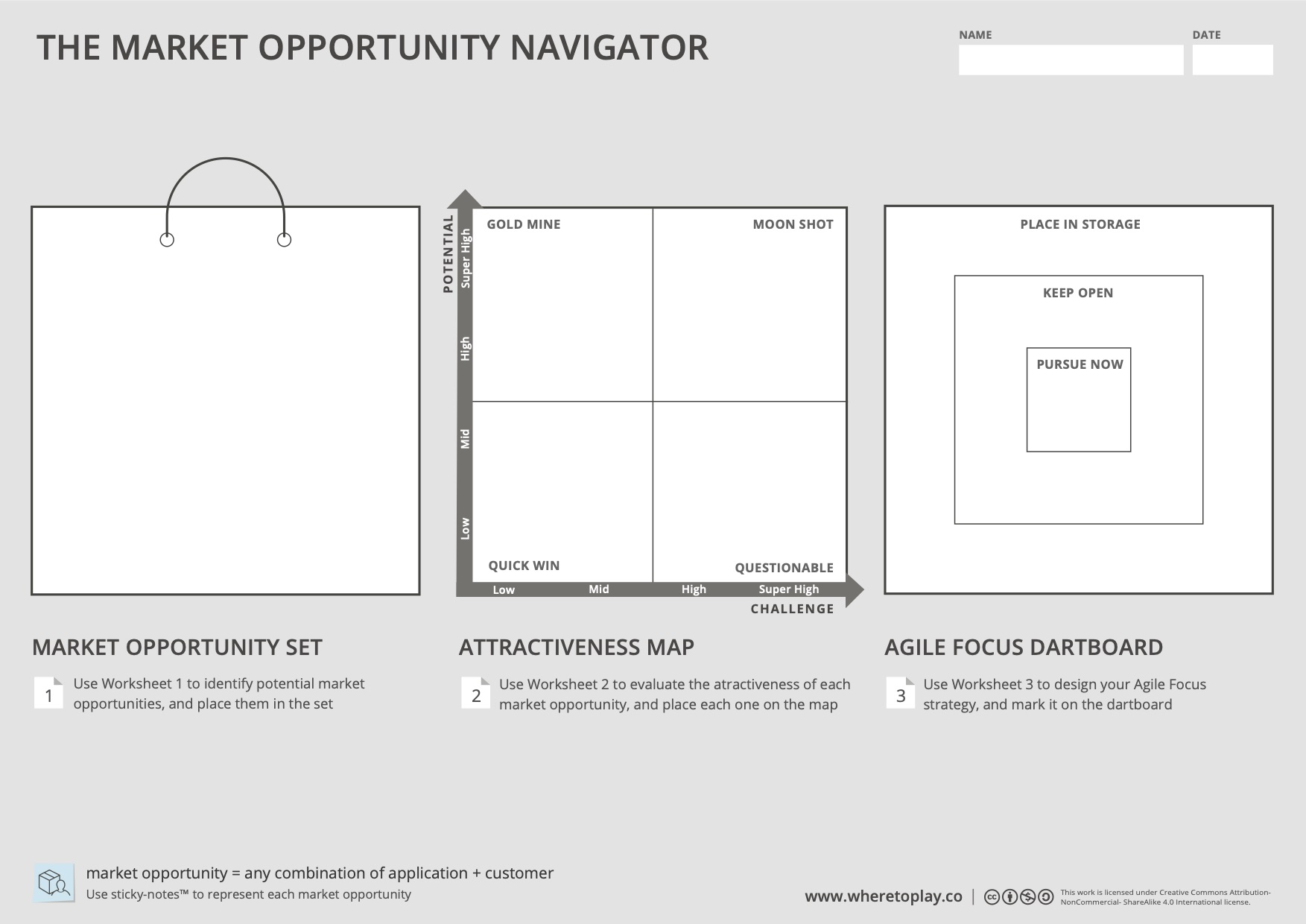
The Three Steps of MON

=== Generate your Market Opportunity Set using Worksheet 1 ===
Using Worksheet 1, managers learn how to describe the core abilities of their firm, independent of any envisioned product, and how to identify different applications that can be developed with these abilities, along with potential customers that may need these applications. The desired outcome is the Market Opportunity Set.

=== Evaluate Market Opportunity Attractiveness using Worksheet 2 ===
Using Worksheet 2, managers learn how to evaluate the attractiveness of each market opportunity based on two dimensions: the potential of the opportunity and the challenge of capturing its value. The result of this scoring process is depicted in the Attractiveness Map (AM).

=== Design your Agile Focus Strategy using Worksheet 3 ===
Using Worksheet 3, managers learn how to assess potential backup and growth options. Once the Primary Market Opportunity is chosen, they decide which opportunities to pursue now, which ones will be kept open for later, and which ones will be placed in storage. The resulting strategy (the "Agile Focus Strategy") is depicted on the Agile Focus Dartboard.

== Case studies and application ==
The MON has been applied in companies worldwide. For instance, MyoTecSci (MTS), a South Korean biotech startup. Its founder, Hyeson Soo Kimmm, utilized MON to focus and prioritize its five market opportunities in the life sciences sector, particularly in the field of muscle health. The startup utilized the tool to cull and prioritize its options, aiding in minimizing risk and optimizing resource allocation for its pre-clinical stage endeavors in tackling sarcopenia and muscle-wasting diseases. Through this strategic approach, MTS's management team streamlined their choice process, enhancing their chances of success in their selected market segments.

MON was used in conjunction with Roger's Diffusion of Innovations Theory and Porter's Diamond Model to analyze the market opportunities for a connected cardiotocography (CTG) telemonitoring solution. MON was utilized within the research framework to assess the potential market for a proposed CTG telemonitoring solution for antenatal care, focusing on a promising market within the OECD. Through a combination of survey analysis, screening of potential markets, qualitative interviews with industry stakeholders and medical professionals, and a literature review, MON helped evaluate the viability and attractiveness of the market opportunity. This approach allowed for a comprehensive examination of various factors influencing adoption, such as industry readiness, regulatory considerations, and customer acceptance, eventually guiding strategic decision-making for market entry and product development.

MON was also used to assess the market opportunities for reusable packaging solutions in e-commerce for retail companies in Austria.

The Market Opportunity Navigator is applied in various programs across the globe. For example, at Cornell Tech's Runway Program, NJIT's new venture management course, and in EU programs.

York et al. (2022) utilized MON as a tool to guide the strategic development and market entry for Bioneedle™ technology, a novel needle-free vaccine delivery platform. MON was applied in three key steps: first, by identifying potential market opportunities where the technology's strengths could meet demand; second, by evaluating these opportunities using an attractiveness map to compare potential benefits and challenges; and finally, by creating an agile focus dartboard to prioritize short- and long-term opportunities. This process helped Bioneedle™ identify high-potential market entry points, such as targeting COVID-19 vaccine delivery while weighing risks and challenges.

Bacq and Wang (2024) applied MON to impact startups by adapting its principles to tackle societal grand challenges. The framework expands on the conventional lean startup model by integrating a multi-stakeholder approach, which is essential for addressing complex social and environmental issues. MON plays a key role in the first phase, known as "value search," where impact entrepreneurs use the tool to identify and map out a wide array of stakeholders, including those affected by the societal challenge. This broader, and more inclusive, stakeholder mapping is crucial for understanding diverse needs and prioritizing market opportunities based on potential social and environmental impact. By doing so, the tool helps impact startups systematically explore where to focus their efforts, ensuring that their initiatives align with stakeholder needs and contribute meaningfully to solving grand challenges.
