= Business model pattern =

Business model patterns are reusable business model architectural components, which can be used in generating a new business model. In the process of new business model generation, the business model innovator can use one or more of these patterns to creating a new business model. Each of these patterns has similarities in characteristics, business model building blocks arrangements and behaviors. Alexander Osterwalder call these similarities the "business model pattern".

"Innovation, entrepreneurship and disruption are not about creative genius",

says A. Osterwalder explaining the need for business model patterns.

Given the goal of reducing costs of the complex software development, it is necessary to use ready-made unified solutions. The pattern facilitates communication between developers via referring to well-known constructions and reduces the number of errors.

== Types ==
- Unbundling business model
- Long tail model
- Multi-sided platform model
- Free as a business model
- Open business model

== See also ==
- Business Model Canvas
- Business model
