= Business model canvas =

Strategic management template

Business model canvas: nine business model building blocks

The business model canvas is a strategic management template that is used for developing new business models and documenting existing ones. It offers a visual chart with elements describing a firm's or product's value proposition, infrastructure, customers, and finances, assisting businesses to align their activities by illustrating potential trade-offs.

The nine "building blocks" of the business model design template that came to be called the business model canvas were initially proposed in 2005 by Alexander Osterwalder, based on his PhD work supervised by Yves Pigneur on business model ontology. Since the release of Osterwalder's work around 2008, the authors have developed related tools such as the Value Proposition Canvas and the Culture Map, and new canvases for specific niches have also appeared.

== Description ==
Formal descriptions of a business become the building blocks for its activities. Many different business conceptualizations exist; Osterwalder's 2004 thesis and co-authored 2010 book propose a single reference model based on the similarities of a wide range of business model conceptualizations. With his business model design template, an enterprise can easily describe its business model.

Osterwalder's canvas has nine boxes: customer segments, value propositions, channels, customer relationships, revenue streams, key resources, key activities, key partnerships, and cost structure. Descriptions below are based largely on the 2010 book Business Model Generation.

- Infrastructure
  - Key activities: The most important activities in executing a company's value proposition. An example for Bic, the pen manufacturer, would be creating an efficient supply chain to drive down costs.
  - Key resources: The resources that are necessary to create value for the customer. They are considered assets to a company that are needed to sustain and support the business. These resources could be human, financial, physical and intellectual.
  - Partner network: In order to optimize operations and reduce risks of a business model, organizations usually cultivate buyer-supplier relationships so they can focus on their core activity. Complementary business alliances also can be considered through joint ventures or strategic alliances between competitors or non-competitors.
- Offering
  - Value propositions: The collection of products and services a business offers to meet the needs of its customers. According to Osterwalder, a company's value proposition is what distinguishes it from its competitors. The value proposition provides value through various elements such as newness, performance, customization, "getting the job done", design, brand/status, price, cost reduction, risk reduction, accessibility, and convenience/usability.
    - The value propositions may be:
      - Quantitative – price and efficiency
      - Qualitative – overall customer experience and outcome
- Customers
  - Customer segments: To build an effective business model, a company must identify which customers it tries to serve. Various sets of customers can be segmented based on their different needs and attributes to ensure appropriate implementation of corporate strategy to meet the characteristics of selected groups of clients. The different types of customer segments include:
    - Mass market: There is no specific segmentation for a company that follows the mass market element as the organization displays a wide view of potential clients: e.g. car.
    - Niche market: Customer segmentation based on specialized needs and characteristics of its clients: e.g. Rolex.
    - Segmented: A company applies additional segmentation within existing customer segment. In the segmented situation, the business may further distinguish its clients based on gender, age, and/or income.
    - Diversify: A business serves multiple customer segments with different needs and characteristics.
    - Multi-sided platform/market: For a smooth day-to-day business operation, some companies will serve mutually dependent customer segments. A credit card company will provide services to credit card holders while simultaneously assisting merchants who accept those credit cards.
  - Channels: A company can deliver its value proposition to its targeted customers through different channels. Effective channels will distribute a company's value proposition in ways that are fast, efficient and cost-effective. An organization can reach its clients through its own channels (store front), partner channels (major distributors), or a combination of both.
  - Customer relationships: To ensure the survival and success of any businesses, companies must identify the type of relationship they want to create with their customer segments. That element should address three critical steps of a customer's relationship: How the business will get new customers, how the business will keep customers purchasing or using its services and how the business will grow its revenue from its current customers. Various forms of customer relationships include:
    - Personal assistance: Assistance in a form of employee-customer interaction. Such assistance is performed during sales and/or after sales.
    - Dedicated personal assistance: The most intimate and hands-on personal assistance in which a sales representative is assigned to handle all the needs and questions of a special set of clients.
    - Self service: The type of relationship that translates from the indirect interaction between the company and the clients. Here, an organization provides the tools needed for the customers to serve themselves easily and effectively.
    - Automated services: A system similar to self-service but more personalized as it has the ability to identify individual customers and their preferences. An example of this would be Amazon.com making book suggestions based on the characteristics of previous book purchases.
    - Communities: Creating a community allows for direct interactions among different clients and the company. The community platform produces a scenario where knowledge can be shared and problems are solved between different clients.
    - Co-creation: A personal relationship is created through the customer's direct input to the final outcome of the company's products/services.
- Finances
  - Cost structure: This describes the most important monetary consequences while operating under different business models.
    - Classes of business structures:
      - Cost-driven – This business model focuses on minimizing all costs and having no frills: e.g. low-cost airlines.
      - Value-driven – Less concerned with cost, this business model focuses on creating value for products and services: e.g. Louis Vuitton, Rolex.
    - Characteristics of cost structures:
      - Fixed costs – Costs are unchanged across different applications: e.g. salary, rent.
      - Variable costs – Costs vary depending on the amount of production of goods or services: e.g. music festivals.
      - Economies of scale – Costs go down as the amount of goods are ordered or produced.
      - Economies of scope – Costs go down due to incorporating other businesses which have a direct relation to the original product.
  - Revenue streams: The way a company makes income from each customer segment. Several ways to generate a revenue stream:
    - Asset sale – (the most common type) Selling ownership rights to a physical good: e.g. retail corporations.
    - Usage fee – Money generated from the use of a particular service: e.g. UPS.
    - Subscription fees – Revenue generated by selling access to a continuous service: e.g. Netflix.
    - Lending/leasing/renting – Giving exclusive right to an asset for a particular period of time: e.g. leasing a car.
    - Licensing – Revenue generated from charging for the use of a protected intellectual property.
    - Brokerage fees – Revenue generated from an intermediate service between 2 parties: e.g. broker selling a house for commission.
    - Advertising – Revenue generated from charging fees for product advertising.

== Application ==
The business model canvas can be printed out on a large surface so that groups of people can jointly start sketching and discussing business model elements with post-it notes or board markers. It is a hands-on tool that aims to foster understanding, discussion, creativity, and analysis. It is distributed under a Creative Commons license from Strategyzer AG and can be used without any restrictions for modeling businesses. It is also available in web-based software format.

== Alternative forms ==
The business model canvas has been used and adapted to suit specific business scenarios and applications, such as Ash Maurya's Lean Canvas for startup companies.

== Criticism ==
The business model canvas has been characterized as static because it does not capture changes in strategy or the evolution of the model nor much detail about the interaction between the components and how this makes the model work. Some limits of the template are its focus on organizations and its consequent conceptual isolation from its environment, whether this is related to the industry structure or to stakeholders such as society and natural environment.

== See also ==
- Business process modeling
- Business plan
- Business reference model
- Minimum viable product § Business Model Canvas
- Nine windows – systems-engineering matrix diagram with nine boxes
- Product/market fit
- Unique selling proposition
