= Component business model =

Component business model (CBM) is a technique to model and analyze an enterprise. It is a logical representation or map of business components or "building blocks" and can be depicted on a single page. It can be used to analyze the alignment of enterprise strategy with the organization's capabilities and investments, identify redundant or overlapping business capabilities, analyze sourcing options for the different components (buy or build), prioritizing transformation options and can be used to create a unified roadmap after mergers or acquisitions.

The model is organized as business components along columns and "operational levels" along rows. The Business components are defined partly as large business areas with characteristic skills, IT capabilities and process. The three operational levels are "Direct", "Control" and "Execute" - they separate strategic decisions (Direct), management checks (Control), and business actions (Execute) on business competencies.

== Criticism ==
Even though IBM’s business model approach is good for mapping the components of a business model or product, the following criticisms have been identified:

- Is built on components that are supposed to consist of people, processes and technology needed by this component to act as a standalone entity. One criticism is that the 'technology' element in each block is not a mandatory part of many business models. It is strategy that is vital within a business model, not technology.
- The term 'process' within IBM's component description, is also criticized as requiring additional explanations because it has dual meaning in Business and single meaning in IT.

== See also ==
- Business model design
- Business process modeling
- Business plan
- Business reference model
