= Bowman's Strategy Clock =

Bowman’s Strategy Clock is a graphical illustration which depicts and illustrates about the competitive edge for the businesses prevailing in the industry where they operate by analyzing the trajectory of the relationship between the important dimensions as denominated by price and perceived value. It is predominantly used in the context of marketing by sellers and multinational companies. According to few scholars and critics, Bowman's Strategy Clock is an extended version to the Porter's Generic Strategies. It is used as an approach which is widely conceived as a competitive strategy model to understanding competitive positioning and strategic choice. The tool was developed jointly by British marketing scholars Cliff Bowman and David Faulkner in the book Competitive and Corporate Strategy during the 1990s.

== Background ==
Businesses and companies constantly want to remain updated and remain relevant in the market by analysing the business environment which is prone to uncertainties. Hence they use models, graphs and various tools to analyse the implications of the challenges posed by the ever changing dynamics of the macro environment. The model was developed to counter the inefficiencies and the loopholes detected in Porter's Generic Strategies, as some critics argued that the model developed by Michael Porter appeared to be somewhat confusing and contradictory to the ambitious intentions of Porter, who had apparently wanted to elaborate on the competitive strategies for business organizations to withstand tight competition and continue to thrive and survive in the industry amid the turbulence and uncertainties in the business environment.

== Eight positions of the Clock and its Application in real world contexts ==
- Route 1 – No frills strategy - No frills strategy in Route 1 is a dimension which indicates that the company can only remain competitive by keeping the price of the product at a lower level. The products which are offered to the market are also of inferior quality and the customer perceive low value regarding the availability and supply of such products.
- Route 2 – Low price strategy - This strategy seeks to achieve lower price than that of the competitors and on the other hand it is also about attempting to give a similar kind of perceived value product just like how competitors also deliver. The low-cost strategy should be achieved in a manner that the rival firms cannot match at all to give a sustainable advantage. Tesco, a multinational retail company could well and truly fit into this criterion as it provides products to customers at affordable price levels while also not compromising on the quality of the products offered. Another popular example which could come into the minds of customers in terms of low pricing is Walmart which has outclassed its competitors with its sheer ambitions on delivering quality products in huge quantities at low price ranges, therefore the organization is able to maximize the profits and return on investments.
- Route 3 – Hybrid strategy - Hybrid strategy which is a dimension in Bowman’s Strategy Clock attempts to exploit the competitive advantage through its mixture of cost leadership and differentiation strategies. IKEA which is regarded as the largest furniture retailer in the world could well and truly fit into the list of companies who have preferred hybrid strategy. IKEA implemented transnational strategy in order to ensure the cooperation between company headquarters in Sweden and its international subsidiaries which operate in other nations in terms of maintaining the same cost levels and differentiation strategy. IKEA manages to keep their sourcing and raw material costs at bay by maintaining a wide network of over 1800 suppliers in around 50 nations and also without compromising on the quality of the furniture produced. IKEA also introduced the concept of ready-to-assemble furniture with the visionary thinking prowess of its founder Ingvar Kamprad which requires customers to assemble the furniture and the strategy which is also known as flat packing helped the company’s progress towards attaining cost advantage.
- Route 4 – Differentiation strategy - Differentiation is a strategy which intends to provide products that offer benefits that are heterogeneous or are different to that of competitors and such products produced by organizations should also be highly valued by the buyers. This is also to achieve competitive advantage by offering better product combinations at same price or enhancing margins by pricing slightly at higher level. Apple which is known for thinking one step ahead of its rivals in terms of innovative products would fit into this criterion as Apple brand is also highly valued by customers all over the world.
- Route 5 – Focused Differentiation - Focused differentiation as far as the Route 5 is concerned in the Bowman’s Strategy Clock depicts the intention of the strategy regarding provision of high perceived value products at the utmost substantial price levels which could convince buyers to purchase such products because of the high perceived value. This particular positioning strategy is a common phenomenon among luxury brands as they cater to a particular target market to sell at the best price ranges for them to earn high profit margins. Businesses also use aggressive promotion and distribution techniques to sell the products. Rolex is a classic example of having exploited the focused differentiation strategy that can be further emphasized with their longstanding association with the sport of tennis, a sport which is considered to be one of the most expensive sports in the world. Rolex has also stamped its authority by sponsoring in many grand slam tennis competitions. Rolex is a most sought-after wristwatch brand among rich, lifestyle-oriented people and the endorsement of the brand by popular tennis players such as Roger Federer who has been sporting the Rolex watch ever since 2011 both on and off the court has also triggered higher perceived value among buyers to buy that brand despite it being sold at expensive prices.
- Route 6 – Risky High Margins - Companies in this position are anticipated to charge significantly high prices for low-value products, a risky strategy that can trigger customer dissatisfaction and the prospects are that the plans are doomed to fail in big time if not assessed properly. Usually, this is a case of a short-term strategy deployed by companies to operate as a canny operator to engage in antics by way of exploiting temporary market supply disequilibrium.
- Route 7 – Monopoly Pricing - A company operating at this level does not really worry about the perceived value and the price they set for their products, because they know they are the only supplier in the market as the only existing firm makes up the entire market and customers are at the receiving end because they do not have the opportunity to find an alternate option if the only supplier continues to manipulate the market by ways of creating artificial shortage. There are massive barriers to enter as well as exit the market by the firms due to the nature of the market being heavily favored towards the only supplier in the industry which sets its own terms and conditions and hence enjoys a huge domination in the industry.
- Route 8 – Loss of Market Share - This undesirable position occurs when a company makes a gamble by not doing anything different at all in terms of their offerings to the market as the price is not competitively priced by the company and the company has also not engaged in differentiation strategies, leading to a loss of market share. This position inculcates ominous signs that the company is about to collapse and decline in the long run due to the company's inability to make a resilient recovery if it continues to stick with their uncompetitive high pricing strategy.
