= Marilyn Waite =

Jamaican-American-French sustainable finance expert

Marilyn Waite is a sustainable finance expert, engineer, author, teacher and podcaster. A national of Jamaica, the United States and France, she is currently Managing Director of the Climate Finance Fund, a platform helping mobilize climate finance.

During her career, Waite has pioneered a number of sustainability-related topics, including creating the SURF Sustainable Economy Framework. Her work has focused on areas such as sustainable energy, climate modeling, and socially responsible investment.

== Education ==
Marilyn Waite holds a master’s degree with distinction in Engineering for Sustainable Development from the University of Cambridge and a Bachelor’s of Science degree in Civil and Environmental Engineering, magna cum laude, from Princeton University.

== Career ==
Marilyn Waite currently serves on the board of the Climate First Bank, and the United States Environmental Protection Agency's Environmental Financial Advisory Board.

Waite teaches sustainable business strategies as part of the Environmental, Social and Governance Strategies course at Sciences Po. She previously served on the European Financial Reporting Advisory Group board.

She previously worked on climate finance for the William and Flora Hewlett Foundation, on clean energy at venture capital firm Village Capital, and was previously a senior research fellow at Project Drawdown.

Waite wrote the book Sustainability at Work: Careers that Make a Difference and co-hosts the Global South Climate Tech podcast and the China Cleantech podcast. Her writing has been featured in publications such as the Financial Times, Euractiv, The Boston Globe and Trellis (formerly GreenBiz). In 2026, she was honored by non-profit Invest for Better in their 'Women Lead the Way' awards, in the Amplifier category.
