= 49th Parallel Coffee Roasters =

Canadian coffee roaster company

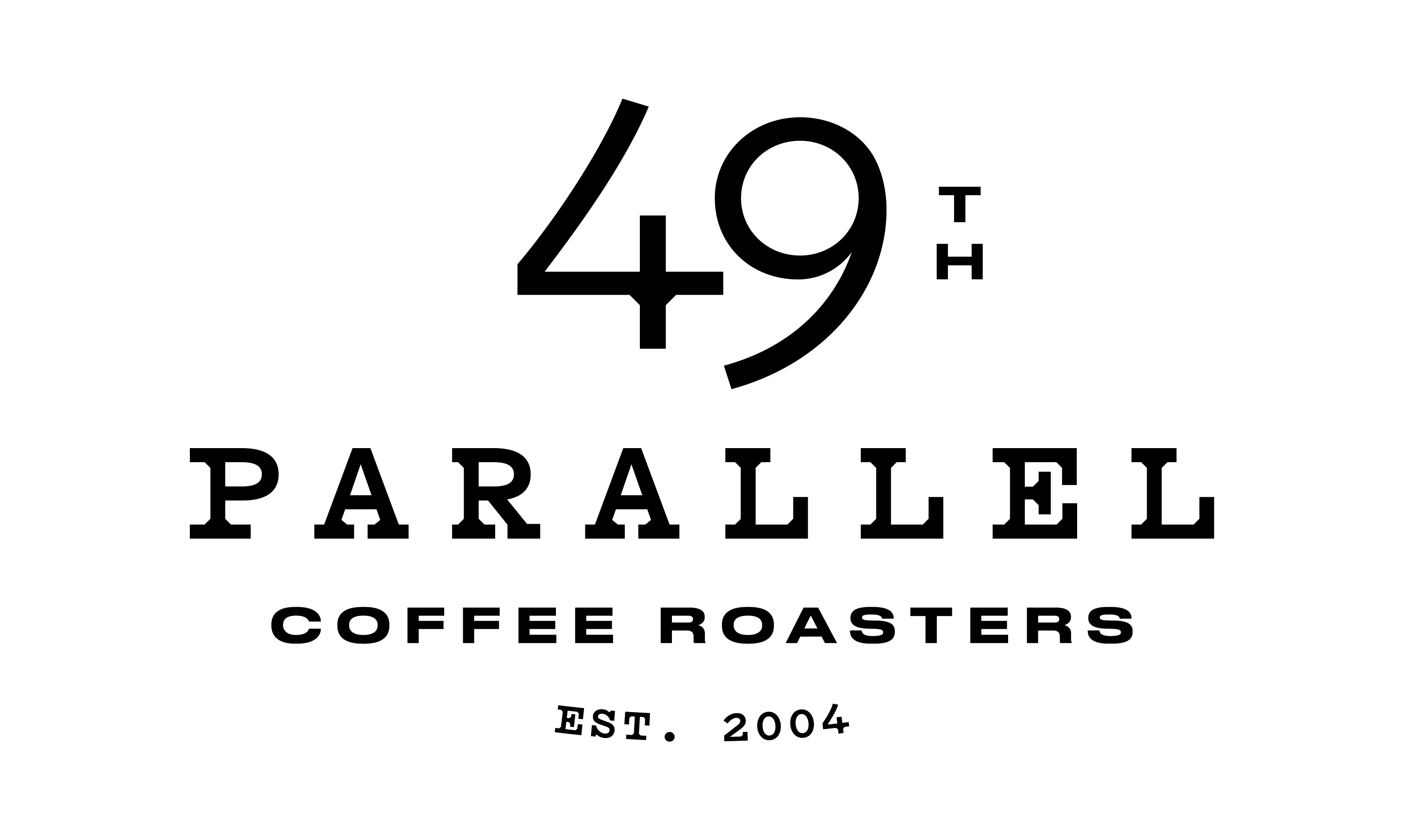
- Industry: Coffee Industry
- Founded: 2004
- Headquarters: Burnaby, British Columbia
- Key people: Vince Piccolo (Founder CEO); Michael Piccolo (Head Roaster); Samantha Taylor (President); Esther Lee (CFO)
- Website: https://49thcoffee.com/

49th Parallel Coffee Roasters is a Canadian specialty coffee roaster company based in Burnaby, British Columbia. It was founded by brothers Vince and Michael Piccolo in 2004. In January 2019, the company announced a strategic partnership with Montreal-based investment firm Claridge Inc. The CBC recognized 49th Parallel Coffee Roasters as a notable specialty coffee roaster in British Columbia. The company sources beans directly from farmers including Honduras, Guatemala, Colombia, Kenya, Costa Rica, Brazil, Ethiopia and more. On March 25, 2021 the company opened a location in Old Montreal, Quebec, their first location outside of British Columbia.
