= EPFL College of Management of Technology =

Research institution in Lausanne, Switzerland

- EPFL Collège du Management de la Technologie
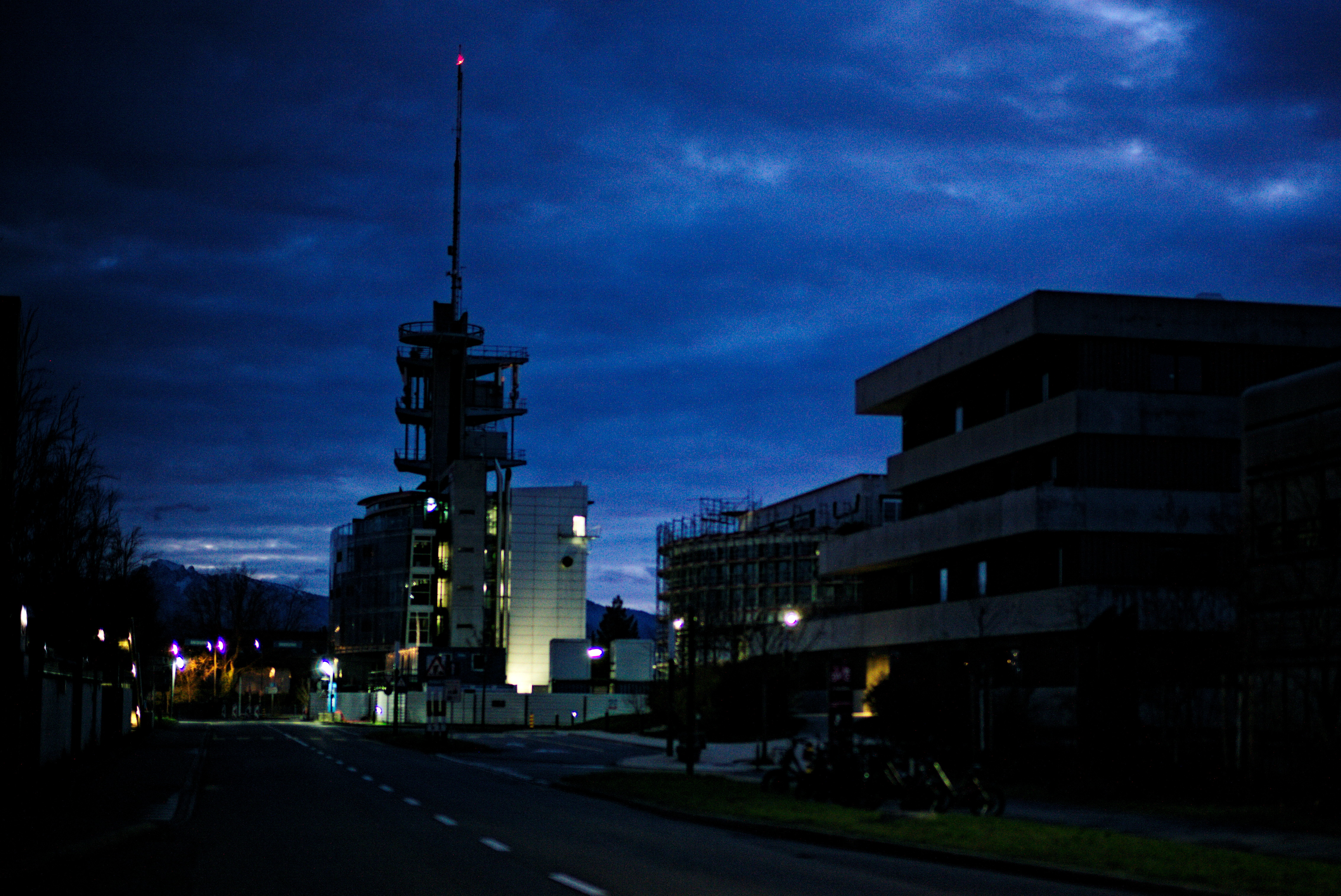
- The Odyssea building, EPFL campus
- Type: Research institution
- Established: 2004
- Parent institution: EPFL
- Location: Lausanne, Switzerland
- Website: epfl.ch/schools/cdm

The College of Management of Technology (French: Collège du Management de la Technologie, abbreviated CDM) is a public research institution and one of the seven schools and colleges of EPFL, the Swiss Federal Institute of Technology in Lausanne, Switzerland. Established in 2004, CDM conducts research and provides graduate and postgraduate education at the intersection of management, engineering and technology. . The college is housed in the Odyssea building at Station 5 on the EPFL campus on the shores of Lake Geneva.

== History ==
The college was established in 2004 under the EPFL presidency of Patrick Aebischer (2000-2016). Its creation reflected a strategic initiative to broaden the university's academic scope beyond natural sciences and engineering to encompass management, finance, and social sciences

== Academic structure ==
CDM is organised into two research institutes and one associated centre.

=== Management of Technology and Entrepreneurship Institute ===
The Management of Technology and Entrepreneurship Institute (MTEI) conducts research in technology management, entrepreneurship, and public policy.

=== Swiss Finance Institute at EPFL ===
The Swiss Finance Institute at EPFL (SFI@EPFL) is affiliated with the Swiss Finance Institute, a non-profit foundation founded in 2006 with support from the Swiss banking sector and public partners. It focuses on mathematical finance, financial engineering and entrepreneurial finance.

=== Enterprise for Society Center ===
The Enterprise for Society Center (E4S) is a joint centre created in 2020 with UNIL (HEC Lausanne) and IMD. The centre focuses on the transition toward a resilient, inclusive and sustainable economy.

== Educational programmes ==
=== Master's degrees ===
CDM supports three master's-level programs:

- Management, Technology and Entrepreneurship (MTE): A two-year master’s program bridging technology and management.
- Financial Engineering (MFE): A two-year master’s program in quantitative finance.
- Sustainable Management and Technology (SMT): A joint master’s degree with UNIL-HEC and IMD through E4S.

=== Doctoral programs ===
The college offers two doctoral programs: the Doctoral program in Management of Technology (EDMT) and the Doctoral program in Finance (EDFI). EDFI is part of the Swiss Finance Institute PhD program for the Léman area, jointly offered by EPFL, the University of Geneva and the University of Lausanne.

=== Executive education ===
CDM provides executive education programs, including the EPFL Executive MBA (EMBA) in innovation and technology management and several Certificate of Advanced Studies (CAS) and executive short courses. The EPFL EMBA is accredited by the Association of MBAs (AMBA).

== Faculty ==
- Pierre Collin-Dufresne
- Jean-Pierre Danthine
- Rüdiger Fahlenbrach
- Matthias Finger
- Damir Filipović
- Dominique Foray
- Marc Gruber
- Julien Hugonnier
- Negar Kiyavash
- Daniel Kuhn
- Luisa Lambertini
- Erwan Morellec
- Gaétan de Rassenfosse
- Ralf Seifert
- Thomas Weber
- Philippe Wieser
