= Founder CEO =

Business officer

A founder CEO, often written as founder / CEO and also as founder & CEO is an individual who establishes a company as a founding CEO and holds its chief executive officer, organizational founder (CEO) position. If the firm's CEO is not a founder or the founder CEO has succeeded, the firm is said to be led by a non-founder CEO or successor CEO.

Research has highlighted differences between the founder and non-founder CEOs that influence firm performance. These differences include: company's shares performance, equity stake in the firm, managerial incentives, research and development investment, and outlook towards mergers and acquisitions.

According to scholars such as Rüdiger Fahlenbrach, founder CEOs outperform their non-founder CEO counterparts in both stock performance and market valuation. They tend to take a long-term view and consider their firm their lifetime achievement, resulting in them holding a larger equity stake in their firm than non-founder CEOs. Darius Palia, S. Abraham Ravid, and Chia-Jane Wang developed this idea further, concluding that founder CEOs become less influenced by managerial incentives as they continue to devote resources to their firm, whereas the opposite is true for non-founder CEOs.

Non-founder CEOs are less invested in their company and are more likely to tailor their performance according to managerial incentives. Scholars such as Joon Mahn Lee, Jongsoo Jays Kim, and Joonhyung Bae, concluded that founder CEOs continually invest in new projects and explore new knowledge to benefit the firm in the long-term. This suggests that a link between founder CEOs and a greater innovation investment. In terms of mergers & acquisitions, Fahlenbrach, along with other scholars, concluded that founder CEOs partake in a greater number of acquisitions within their core business line each year, as they have a greater risk tolerance. it is suggested that this additional risk taken on by founder CEOs stems from overconfidence at the CEO level, which some scholars have measured through their tone in tweets, regarding both earnings calls and personal statements, and their option exercise behavior relative to non-founder CEOs.

Founder CEO succession can occur through both voluntary and involuntary means. American academic Noam Wasserman found that in the majority of founder CEO successions, the founder is forced to step down by investors. Founder CEOs who successfully execute new product development or enter into negotiations with potential outside investors for additional capital have a higher likelihood of being replaced than those who are not as successful with product development and/or do not to raise additional capital. Indicated by several scholars, like Wasserman, as the CEO becomes successful in product development, the needs of the firm expand and a mismatch between the current skills of the founder CEO and the new skills needed for the firm's success is likely to occur, thus increasing the probability of succession. Founder CEOs are generally succeeded by someone from outside of the firm. Founder CEO comebacks have occurred whereby the founder CEO was replaced and later returned to their role as CEO.

Eleven percent of the large capitalization firms in the United States are led by founder CEOs, including well-known companies such as Facebook, Netflix, Nvidia, FedEx and Amazon.

A person or several people can be founders of a firm. The founders earn the 'founder' title only once the firm becomes operational, at which point their founder role ends. Founders do not have a particular role once the business is established, but their influence inevitably continues as they designed the firm's blueprint affecting structures and decision-making.

== Negative and positive contributions to firm performance ==
Within research, several differences have been identified between how firms are led by founder CEOs and non-founder CEOs. Differences identified include stock performance, equity stake, managerial incentives, innovation investment and participation in mergers and acquisitions.

In November 2009, Fortune Magazine named Steve Jobs, founder of Apple Inc., the CEO of the decade. The six runners-up, all founder CEOs, were: Bill Gates, Warren Buffett, Martha Stewart, Bernard Madoff, Sergey Brin and Oprah Winfrey.

=== Stock performance ===
According to some scholars, such as Rudiger Fahlenbrach, firms led by founder CEOs outperform those led by non-founder CEOs, in both stock performance and market valuation. Between 1993 and 2002, an equally weighted portfolio consisting of companies led by founder CEOs would have earned an annual benchmark-adjusted return of 8.3%. In other words, an excess abnormal return of 4.4% annually.

As of March 2016, 16 companies in the S&P 500 still have founder CEOs, who have been with the company for at least five years. In aggregate, these companies have generated a five-year average return of 170%, significantly greater than the 56% five-year S&P 500 gain. Of these companies, 14 have outperformed the market over the past three years. These companies include: Facebook, Netflix, Under Armour, Nvidia, Amazon.com, Starbucks, Regeneron Pharmaceuticals, L Brands, VeriSign, FedEx, Salesforce.com, Akamai Technologies, Intercontinental Exchange, and SanDisk.

=== Equity stake ===
Fahlenbrach, like other scholars, concluded that founder CEOs have a larger equity stake in the firm, potentially reducing the principal agent problem. Founder CEOs consider their firm their lifetime achievement and therefore take a long-term view. This approach results in the optimal shareholder-value maximizing strategy.

=== Managerial incentives ===
Incentive structures do differ for firms led by founder CEOs and non-founder CEOs as a result of different pay-performance sensitivity, as concluded by several scholars including Palia, Ravid, and Wang. A statistically significant relationship is present between these two variables for firms led by non-founder CEOs. Non-founder CEOs tend to be less invested in their company and are more likely to tailor their performances according to their payment incentives.

Meanwhile, this relationship is insignificant for founder CEOs, who become less influenced by pay incentives as they devote more time and energy to their firm. This founder CEO attachment to their firm results in lower salaries, which can be seen in a study completed by Noam Wasserman on 528 ventures between the years 1996 and 2002. The results of this study concluded that 51% of founder CEOs make either the same salary or one that is lower than someone who reports to them. Additionally, the results showed that founder CEOs receive 20% less in cash compensation than their non-founder CEO counterparts with similar experience.

=== Innovation investment ===
Scholars have indicated that founder CEOs experience greater innovation performance than non-founder CEOs, who tend to be risk averse. Extant research attributes these differences in innovation investment to founder CEOs taking a long-term approach, continually investing in new projects, and exploring new knowledge. Thus suggesting that founder CEOs are not as concerned with job security or impacted by short term performance, as a result resources are dedicated to the long-term. Lee, Kim, and Bae found that the existence of a founder CEO is correlated with a 31 percent increase in the citation-weighted patent count before controlling for research and development spending and a 23 percent increase after controlling for research and development spending.

=== Mergers and acquisitions ===
Fahlenbrach, along with others concluded founder-CEOs have a greater risk tolerance and partake in a greater number of acquisitions per year than non-founder CEOs. The acquisitions that founder-CEOs make do not diversify their portfolio because their acquisitions tend to be within their core businesses. Joon Mahn Lee, Byoung-Hyoun Hwang, and Hailiang Chen suggested that the additional risks taken on by founder-led firms stem from overconfidence at the CEO level.

==== Founder CEO overconfidence ====
Founder-CEOs overconfidence may have negative or positive effect on their firms. In a study completed on the S&P 1500 firms by Lee, Hwang, and Chen, it was concluded that founder CEOs use fewer negative words in both personal tweets and statements regarding earnings. This optimism was observed to exist at the executive level as well. Founder CEOs also provide more optimistic earnings estimates than their non-founder counterparts. Investors are unaware of this overconfidence bias among founder CEOs and take them at face value indicating no discount taken into consideration in the financial markets.

In a 1988 study completed by researchers at Purdue University, this overconfidence was seen when 3,000 entrepreneurs, founders, claimed there was an 81% chance of success for them and only a 59% chance for peers. One in three of these entrepreneurs believed they had a 100% success rate.

Additionally, options, which are tied to firm performance, were taken into account in Lee, Hwang, and Chen's study to measure overconfidence as most CEOs, founders or non-founders, are compensated in options to an extent. When analyzing option-exercise behavior using the value of vested in-the-money options to the total compensation, they concluded that founder CEOs had a significantly greater ratio. By comparison, they concluded that non-founder CEOs generally exercise their options immediately when they become exercisable in-the-money to receive cash and remove their compensation linkage to future performance. Founder CEOs, however, hold off on exercising their in-the-money options as they are overly optimistic about the firm's future performance.

== Founder CEO succession ==
=== Occurrence ===
Wasserman concluded within the first three years of business operation, 50% of founder CEOs step down. The following year, another 10% step down and, by the time the firm has an initial public offering, less than 25% of founders still hold the CEO position. This being said, the decision to step down is not always voluntary, four out of five founder CEOs are forced to relinquish their role as CEO by investors.

=== Events affecting replacement likelihood ===
As indicated in Wasserman's study and others, founder CEOs experience higher turnover when they:

- Successfully execute product development. Thus, the quicker the founder CEO leads the firm to success in product development, the quicker they will be replaced. As the needs of the firm expand with product development, a mismatch is likely to occur between the current skills of the founder CEO and the new skills needed for the firm's success.
- Enter negotiations with potential investors for additional capital. As personal investors (family and friends), angel investors, and venture capitalists invest in the firm, founder CEOs must often give up some control. It is also possible that potential investors will make their investment in the firm contingent upon the appointment of a new CEO. This occurs when the investors do not trust the founder CEO's ability to lead the company longer term. The likelihood of this happening is higher when the amount of capital needed is higher and outsiders have a larger equity stake in the firm, giving them more control in these decisions.

=== Founder CEO successor origin ===
Wasserman concluded that founder CEOs are almost always replaced by someone outside the organization (outside successor) opposed to someone inside (inside successor). Smaller and younger firms turn to tend to turn to outsiders, whereas in larger firms the board of directors is disinclined to appoint an outsider successor CEO unless the firm has experienced poor past performance. Relative to inside successors, outside successors are known to make more changes within the firm altering the firms overall business strategy, earn higher compensation and achieve higher inter-organizational status.

=== Founder CEO comeback ===
A founder CEO comeback can be defined as a founder CEO who relinquishes their role as CEO and later returns to the position. A study completed by Ryan Krause, Abhijith G. Acharya, and Jeffrey G. Covin, on fourteen high-profile Fortune 1000 comeback firms, including Apple, Starbucks, Gateway, Dell, Charles Schwab, Peoplesoft and Google, identified five key conditions attributable to a founder-CEO comeback. The conditions include: poor performance, unplanned succession, founder on board, founder ownership, and interdependent board.
