= Virtual business model =

Method to organizing a startup company

A virtual business model is a way to organize a startup company.

In the virtual company, the utilization of the financial resources can be optimized with cost-effective product development as a result. This business model is defined using several criteria; the company has a limited number of employees; the management has competence for product and business development; the company has financial resources to perform or has the ambition to find such financial resources; the company has a defined plan for the use of the financial resources; the majority of the operations are performed at organizations outside the virtual company; the ownership of the created value (e.g. technical results, patents) developed by the external resources providers belongs to the virtual company.

After the foundation of the virtual company and the development of the business using external service providers, the company can continue to use the virtual company format for continued product development or after some time the company can transform to a traditional integrated company.
