= Marc Gruber =

German management researcher

Professor Marc Gruber
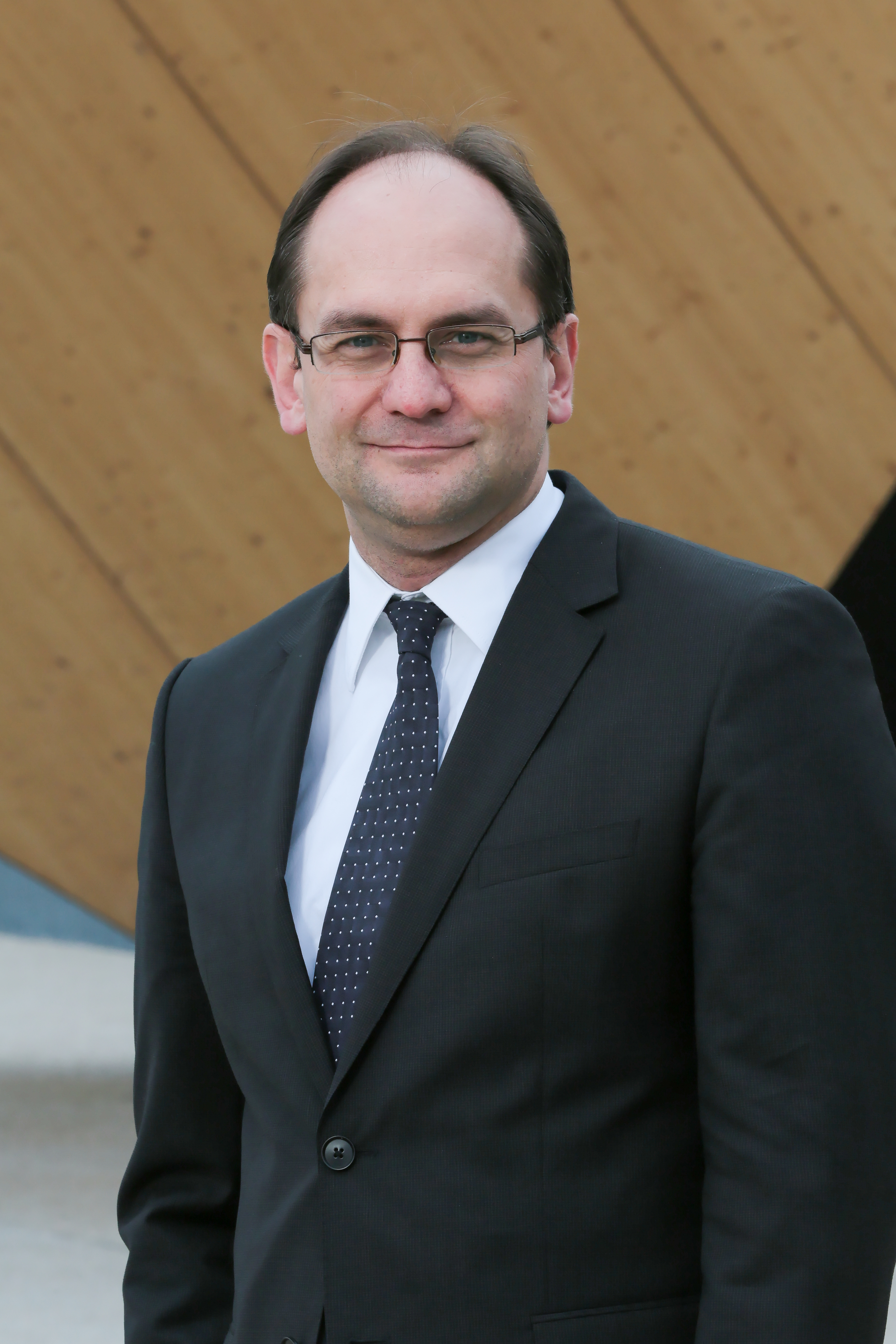
- Marc Gruber in 2017
- Born: 1972 (age 53–54); Munich

Academic background
- Education: Economy
- Alma mater: University of St. Gallen
- Thesis: Erfolgsfaktoren des Wirtschaftens von KMU im Zeitablauf: dargestellt an Beispielen aus der deutschen Nahrungs- und Genussmittelindustrie (2000)
- Doctoral advisor: Hans Jobst Pleitner; Andreas Grüner
- Other advisors: Dietmar Harhoff; Manfred Schwaiger

Academic work
- Discipline: Management
- Sub-discipline: Entrepreneurship; Innovation and strategic management
- Institutions: École Polytechnique Fédérale de Lausanne (EPFL)
- Website: https://www.epfl.ch/labs/entc/

Marc Gruber (born 1972 in Munich) is a management scholar and researcher specializing in technology commercialization. He is a professor at École Polytechnique Fédérale de Lausanne (EPFL), and holds the Chair of Entrepreneurship and Technology Commercialization at EPFL's College of Management of Technology. In 2022, he was appointed as Editor-in-Chief of the Academy of Management Journal. In 2016, he has been named among the five most influential researchers worldwide in entrepreneurship research.

== Career ==
Gruber received a Master's degree in management from the University of St. Gallen (HSG) in 1995. Staying at HSG, he wrote a PhD thesis on "Erfolgsfaktoren des Wirtschaftens von KMU im Zeitablauf: dargestellt an Beispielen aus der deutschen Nahrungs- und Genussmittelindustrie" (Success factors of SMEs over time: illustrated by examples from the German food and luxury food industry) and graduated in 2000. He then joined LMU Munich as senior researcher and lecturer, to establish the university's entrepreneurship center and to pursue his habilitation thesis.

He obtained his habilitation from LMU's School of Management in 2005 for his research entitled "Marketingplanung von wagniskapitalfinanzierten Unternehmensgründungen – eine theoretische und empirische Analyse" (Marketing planning of venture capital-financed start-ups – a theoretical and empirical analysis). During that time he was vice-director of the Institute of Innovation Research, Technology Management and Entrepreneurship and established LMU's Center for Entrepreneurship. He has held several visiting scholar posts at the Wharton School in 2004, and at the University of Pennsylvania in 1999 and 2004. He was also a visiting professor at the Business School of Imperial College London in 2015.

In 2005, Gruber joined EPFL and since then has been the Chair of Entrepreneurship and Technology Commercialization (ENTC), first as an Assistant Professor and was promoted to associate professor in 2008. Since 2011, Gruber has been a full professor at EPFL's College of Management of Technology. From 2017 to 2020, he was vice president for Innovation at EPFL, and President of EPFL's Innovation Park.

== Research ==
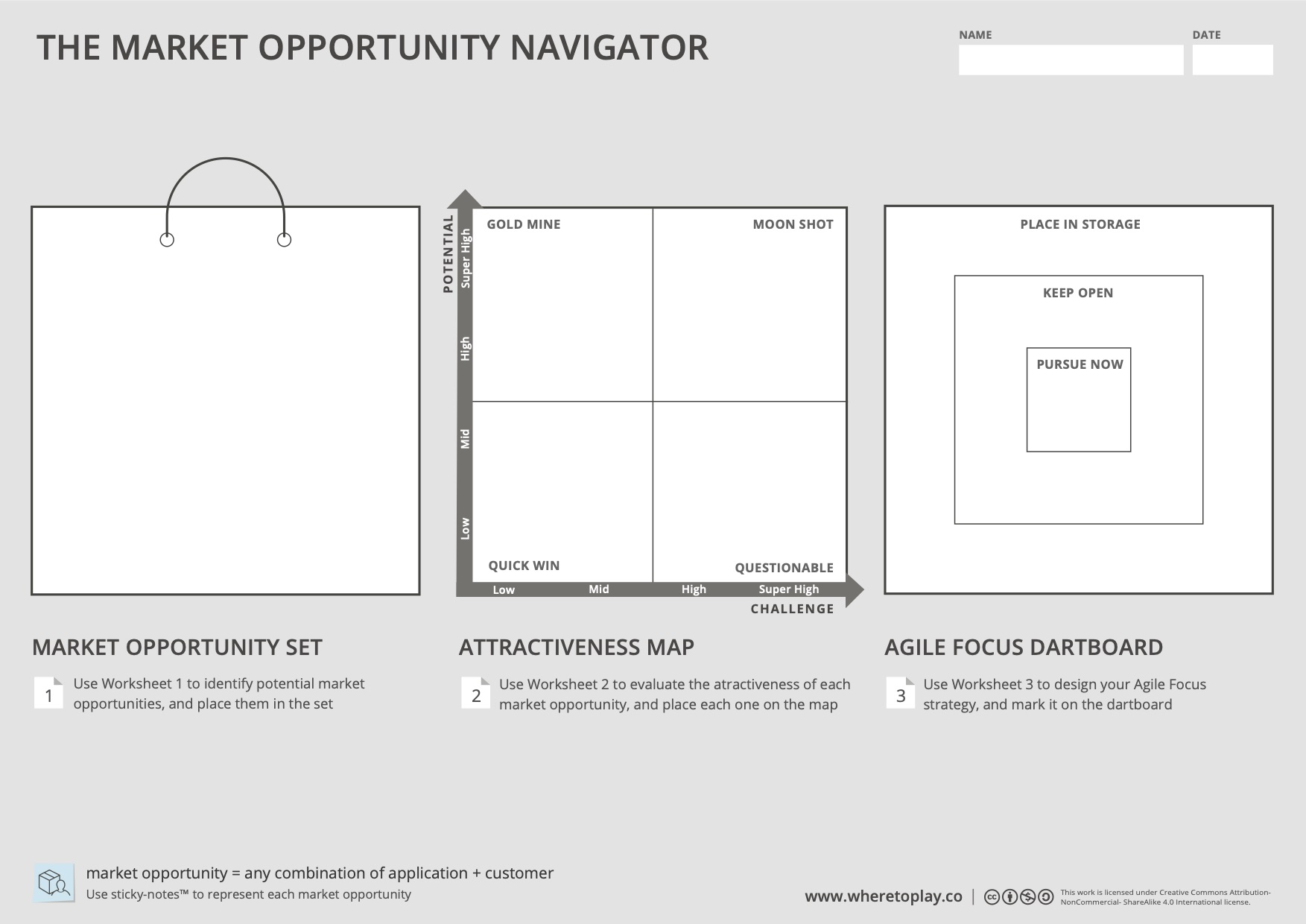
Where to Play: The Market Opportunity Navigator worksheets

Gruber's group focuses his research on the fields of entrepreneurship, technology commercialization, innovation, and strategic management.

Together with Sharon Tal, he created the Market Opportunity Navigator, a tool that supports firms in market opportunity identification and exploitation. The tool is used by more than 50,000 companies and has been adopted as the 4th tool in the lean start-up tool-set.

Gruber's research was featured in several news outlets: Bilan, Le Temps, Voice of FinTech podcast, and Neue Zürcher Zeitung. From 2001 to 2003, he wrote for the column Start-Up for the Frankfurter Allgemeine Zeitung.

== Awards and distinctions ==
He is the recipient of the TUM Research Excellence Award from the European Academy of Management (2012), the Thought Leader Award of the Entrepreneurship Division at the Academy of Management (2009, 2010, 2012), and the Mentor Award of the Entrepreneurship Division at the Academy of Management (2019), and the Foundational Paper Award of the Entrepreneurship Division at the Academy of Management for his study "Darwinians, Communitarians, and Missionaries: The Role of Founder Identity in Entrepreneurship" (with Fauchart, E.) published in Academy of Management Journal in 2011.

Gruber acted as an associate from 2013 to 2016 and as deputy editor from 2017 to 2020, then Editor-in-Chief since 2022 at the Academy of Management Journal, the world's highest-ranked journal for empirical management research.

He is a member of the Academy of Management, and of the Verband der Hochschullehrer für Betriebswirtschaft.

== Selected works ==
- Gruber, Marc; MacMillan, Ian C.; Thompson, James D. (2013). "Escaping the Prior Knowledge Corridor: What Shapes the Number and Variety of Market Opportunities Identified Before Market Entry of Technology Start-ups?". Organization Science. 24 (1): 280–300. doi:10.1287/orsc.1110.0721. JSTOR 23362113.
- Fauchart, Emmanuelle; Gruber, Marc (2011). "Darwinians, Communitarians, and Missionaries: The Role of Founder Identity in Entrepreneurship". Academy of Management Journal. 54 (5): 935–957. doi:10.5465/amj.2009.0211.
- Gruber, Marc; MacMillan, Ian C.; Thompson, James D. (2008). "Look Before You Leap: Market Opportunity Identification in Emerging Technology Firms". Management Science. 54 (9): 1652–1665. doi:10.1287/mnsc.1080.0877.
- Gruber, Marc; Tal, Sharon (2017). Where to Play: 3 Steps for Discovering Your Most Valuable Market Opportunities. Pearson. ISBN 9781292178929.
