= Network orchestrator =

Network Orchestrator Companies are defined as:

... companies [that] create a network of peers in which the participants interact and share in the value creation. They may sell products or services, build relationships, share advice, give reviews, collaborate, co-create and more. Examples include eBay, Red Hat, Visa, Uber, Tripadvisor, and Alibaba.

The concept was born in the early 1990s among several organizational behavior researches that were conducted by many scholars of that time such as Malone & Crowston, Lipparini & Sobrero, Powell et al., Simonin, and many others. In 2001, the term "Network Orchestrator" was officially used by the authors Remo and Julian, after that several researches that followed used this nomination when referring to this structure of organizational relationship.

A November 2014 Harvard Business Review article used the definition presented in proposing a new kind of business model, moving from the past standard of industrial classifications to a standard considering the principal way an organization invests its capital to generate and capture value. Their suggestion of a new kind of business model was constructed evaluating companies' descriptions of themselves in annual reports, revenues generated by different business units, capital allocation patterns such as R&D or COGS expenditure, and market perceptions including news articles and analyst reports.

== Characteristics ==
Network Orchestrators Companies are considered as more profitable companies, which have a faster growth, higher return on assets, lower marginal costs and larger profit margins.

The authors also mentioned that as of 2013, Network Orchestrators Companies received valuations regarding their stock exchange shares or their value between two and four times higher, on average, than traditional companies. This reflects the calculations based on companies' market valuation and revenues, which are values difficult to manipulate with accounting, reflecting investor expectations for future cash flows.

This kind of companies shifted from physical to digital, enabling a digital platform in which people can congregate.

== Competences ==
Network Orchestrators Companies' competences rely on:

1. Intangibles knowledge, for example companies as Gerson Lehrman Group, AlphaSights, Third Bridge or Coleman Research.
2. Relationships, for example companies as Facebook, Pinterest, or Instagram.
3. Assets required by people, for example Uber, Airbnb, TripAdvisor, Red Hat, Lyft, or Instacart.
4. New “non-management” and “non-ownership” competencies related to facilitating a network of individuals, their individual assets and relationships.

== Intangible Assets ==
Barry Libert, Yoram (Jerry) Wind and Megan Beck also state that the Generally Accepted Accounting Principles (GAAP) usually categorize plant property and equipment as "assets" and all other costs such as people, trainings, and intellectual property as "others expenses", but this usual model does not include others important "assets" such as customers, sentiment, and networks relationships. This leads many companies to under-allocate capital to intangible assets. This situation brings advantages to Network Orchestrators Companies because intangible assets make up approximately 80% of corporate market value. Besides of that, Wharton University of Pennsylvania stated that:

...many of the most valuable goods in our market — such as ideas, intellectual capital, and access — digitizable, but also our digital networks allow them to proliferate with great ease. The scaling cost is close to zero. When you add the network effect, where each additional participant (or node) in the network increases the value for every other participant, the network drives its own growth.

Intangible assets dominate the current market with over 80% of its value, when by 1975 it consisted of only 17%, reflecting an obvious and significant change from tangible (physical) to intangible assets. Orban Mendoza Valiente stated that:

The physical assets will always be relevant but they are a ghost of the industrial revolution where products were manufactured in workshops, with low wages, and insufferable conditions. Today it is different of course but there is a new revolution, the revolution for the intangible.

The evaluation of the intangibles are intuitive and are difficulty to measure, for example the building of the U.S. interstate highway took about 35 years and was estimated in $425 billion, Facebook instead grew up to 500 million users in a little more than six years, indicating that digital technology and networks made a significant difference in current business models.
