= Rüdiger Fahlenbrach =

German economist

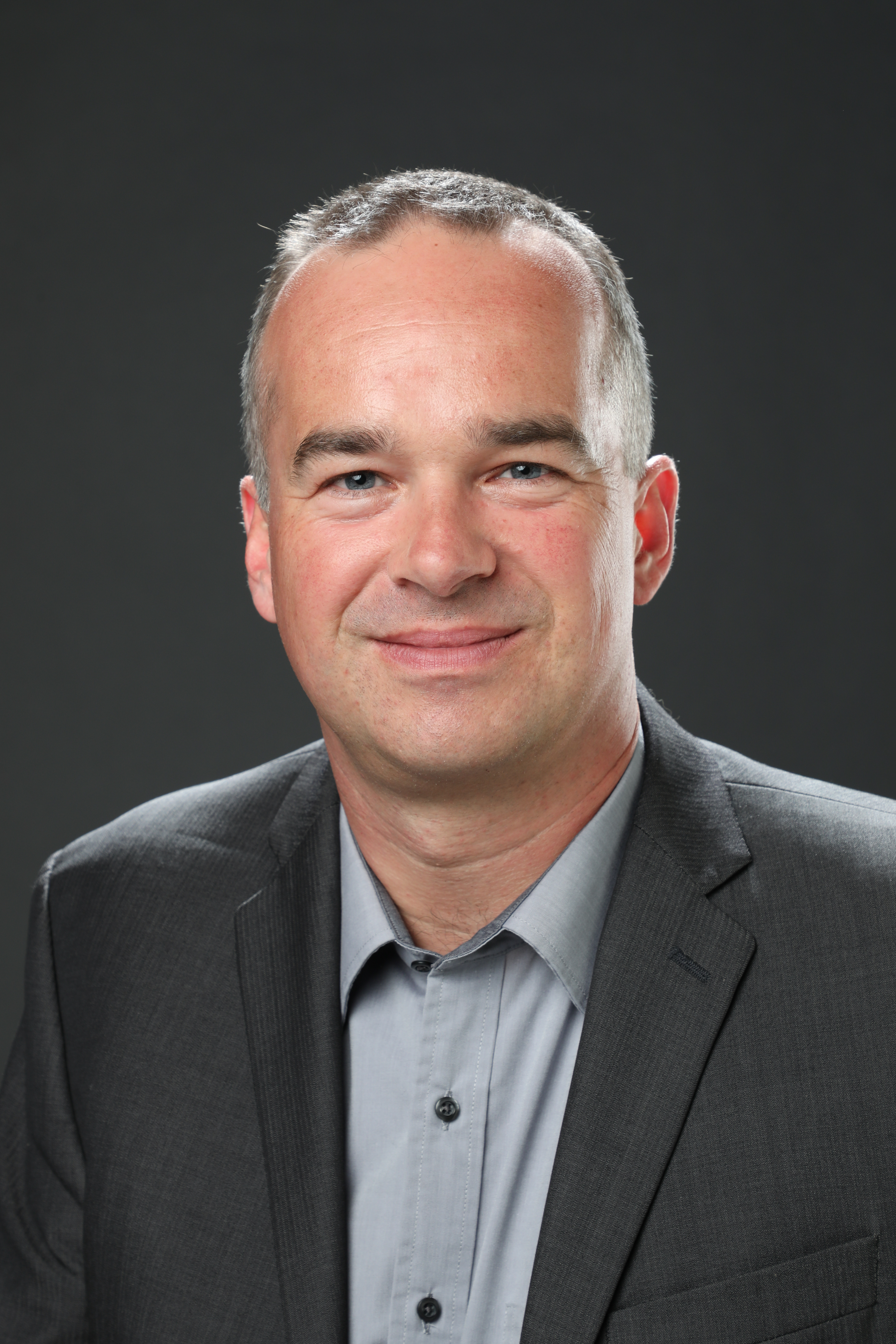
- Rüdiger Fahlenbrach in 2021
- Born: 1974 (age 51–52); Essen, West Germany
- Citizenship: Germany
- Education: University of Mannheim; ESSEC Business School; University of Pennsylvania
- Scientific career
- Fields: Business administration Finance
- Workplaces: École Polytechnique Fédérale de Lausanne
- Thesis: Essays in Corporate Governance (2004)
- Doctoral advisor: Andrew Metrick
- Website: https://www.epfl.ch/labs/sfi-rf/

Rüdiger Fahlenbrach (born 1974 in Essen, West Germany) is a German economist specialised in finance. He is a professor of finance at EPFL (École Polytechnique Fédérale de Lausanne) and holds the Swiss Finance Institute Senior Research Chair. He is currently the director of the College of Management of Technology.

== Career ==
From 1995 to 1999, Fahlenbrach studied business administration at the University of Mannheim in Germany and at the ESSEC Business School in France. He then pursued a PhD in finance with Andrew Metrick at the Wharton School of the University of Pennsylvania. In 2004, he graduated with a PhD thesis "Essays in Corporate Governance". Afterwards he joined the Fisher College of Business at the Ohio State University as an assistant professor of finance to work on ownership structures of large public corporations for corporate policies and performance. In 2009 he moved to the Swiss Finance Institute at EPFL where he currently is full professor and holds a Swiss Finance Institute Senior Research Chair.

He has held visiting professorships, at Vienna University of Economics and Business, European School of Management and Technology in Berlin, University of New South Wales, Paris Dauphine University, and Halle Institute for Economic Research.

== Research ==
Fahlenbrach's research interests are on empirical corporate finance and banking. He has investigated corporate governance issues that arise from the separation of ownership and control in the modern public corporation, and examined the causes and effects of the 2008 financial crisis, including the role of bank governance and regulatiuon for the crisis. He has published in the Journal of Finance, the Journal of Financial Economics, the Review of Financial Studies, the Review of Finance, and the Journal of Financial and Quantitative Analysis.

His research has been covered in The New York Times, The Wall Street Journal, The Economist, Le Temps, NZZ, Handelsblatt, Forbes magazine, USA Today, and Financial Times.

== Distinctions ==
Fahlenbrach served as director of the European Finance Association (2018-2020), and in 2020, he was appointed chair of the scientific council and member of the scientific advisory board of the Halle Institute for Economic Research. He is a research member of the European Corporate Governance Institute. He has been associate editor of the Review of Financial Studies (2013-2016) and Financial Management (2012-2016). Since 2014, he has been associate editor of the Review of Finance.

== Selected works ==
- Fahlenbrach, Rüdiger; Prilmeier, Robert; Stulz, René M. (2018). "Why Does Fast Loan Growth Predict Poor Performance for Banks?". The Review of Financial Studies. 31 (3): 1014–1063. doi:10.1093/rfs/hhx109.
- Schmidt, Cornelius; Fahlenbrach, Rüdiger (2017). "Do exogenous changes in passive institutional ownership affect corporate governance and firm value?". Journal of Financial Economics. 124 (2): 285–306. doi:10.1016/j.jfineco.2017.01.005.
- Cronqvist, Henrik; Fahlenbrach, Rüdiger (2013). "CEO contract design: How do strong principals do it?". Journal of Financial Economics. 108 (3): 659–674. doi:10.1016/j.jfineco.2013.01.013.
- Evans, Richard B.; Fahlenbrach, Rüdiger (2012). "Institutional Investors and Mutual Fund Governance: Evidence from Retail–Institutional Fund Twins". Review of Financial Studies. 25 (12): 3530–3571. doi:10.1093/rfs/hhs105.
- Fahlenbrach, Rüdiger; Prilmeier, Robert; Stulz, René M. (2012). "This Time is the Same: Using Bank Performance in 1998 to Explain Bank Performance during the Recent Financial Crisis". The Journal of Finance. 67 (6): 2139–2185. doi:10.1111/j.1540-6261.2012.01783.x. S2CID 53465840.
- Fahlenbrach, Rüdiger; Stulz, René M. (2011). "Bank CEO incentives and the credit crisis". Journal of Financial Economics. 99: 11–26. doi:10.1016/j.jfineco.2010.08.010. S2CID 154794185.
- Becker, Bo; Cronqvist, Henrik; Fahlenbrach, Rüdiger (2011). "Estimating the Effects of Large Shareholders Using a Geographic Instrument". doi:10.3386/w17393.
- Fahlenbrach, Rüdiger; Minton, Bernadette A.; Pan, Carrie H. (2011). "Former CEO Directors: Lingering CEOs or Valuable Resources?". Review of Financial Studies. 24 (10): 3486–3518. doi:10.1093/rfs/hhr056.
- Cronqvist, Henrik; Fahlenbrach, Rüdiger (2009). "Large Shareholders and Corporate Policies". Review of Financial Studies. 22 (10): 3941–3976. doi:10.1093/rfs/hhn093.
- Fahlenbrach, Rüdiger (2009). "Founder-CEOs, Investment Decisions, and Stock Market Performance". Journal of Financial and Quantitative Analysis. 44 (2): 439–466. doi:10.1017/S0022109009090139. S2CID 49574741.
- Fahlenbrach, Rüdiger (2009). "Shareholder Rights, Boards, and CEO Compensation". Review of Finance. 13: 81–113. doi:10.1093/rof/rfn011.
