= Dominique Foray =

French economist

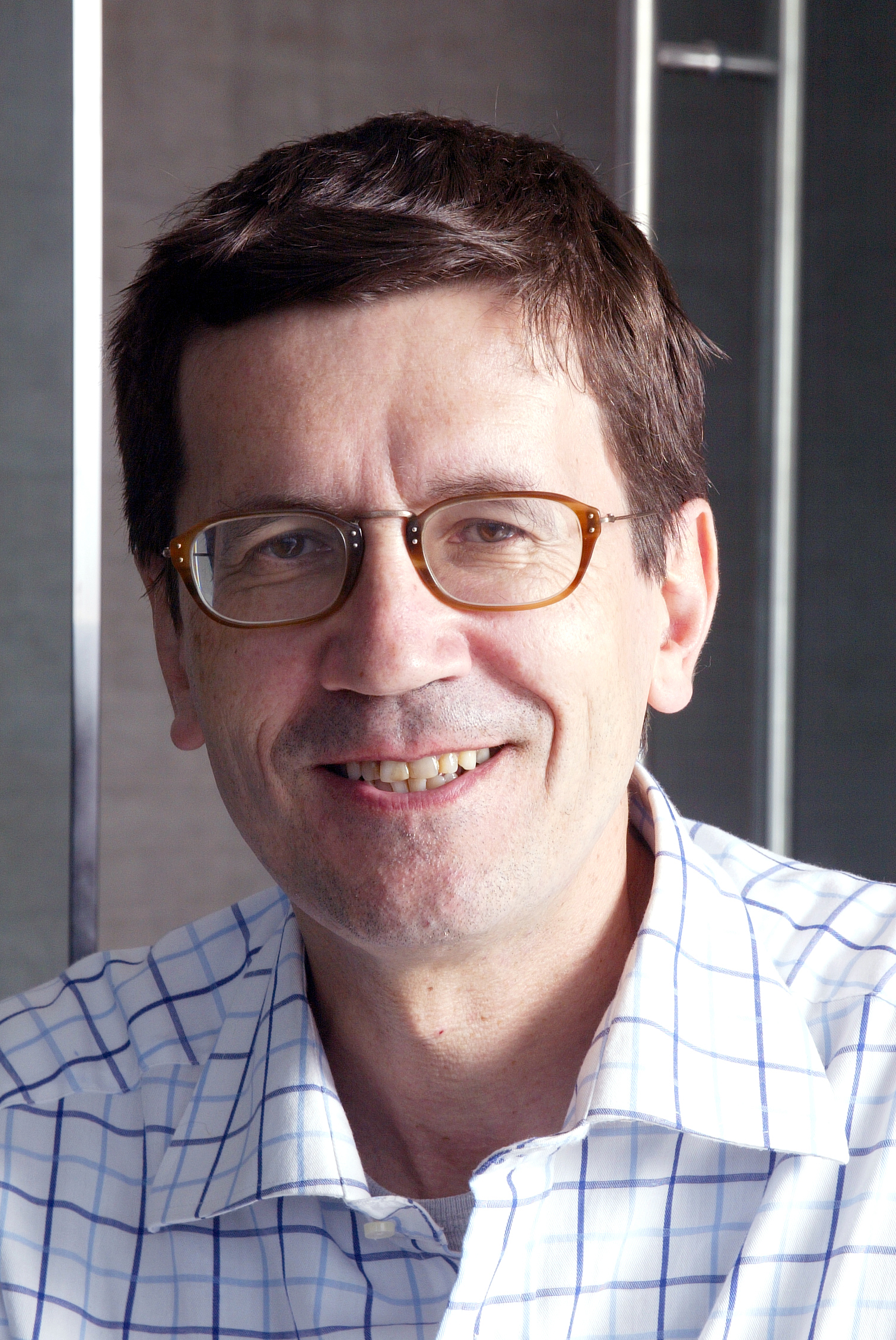
- Dominique Foray in 2020

Academic background
- Education: Université Lumière Lyon 2 CNRS

Academic work
- Discipline: Economics
- Sub-discipline: Management
- Institutions: EPFL (École Polytechnique Fédérale de Lausanne)
- Website: http://cemi.epfl.ch

Dominique Foray holds the Chair of Economics & Management of Innovation at the EPFL (École Polytechnique Fédérale de Lausanne) in the Collège du Management de la Technologie.

== Life and career ==
Foray received his Ph.D. in 1984 and his habilitation in 1992 from the Université Lumière Lyon 2. In 1985, he joined the CNRS as a research fellow. In 1990 he joined the Ecole Centrale Paris as professor of Economics and returned to the CNRS in 1994. He was invited professor at the University of Padua in 1993, of Santiago de Compostela in 1995, 1996, 1997, and 1998, and of the University of Turin. He did one-to three-month research visits to the WZB Berlin Social Science Center in 1986, Stanford University in 1991, and the International Institute for Applied Systems Analysis in 1993, 1994, and 1995.

From 1993 to 1995, Foray was a permanent consultant (part-time) at the OECD (Division for Science, Technology and Industry) where he contributed to the programme on "National Systems of Innovation". He received the distinction of outstanding research 1993 from the CNRS. He was elected as Research Fellow at the ICER foundation (Italy) for the academic year 1999 and at the Institute for Advanced Study, Berlin, for the academic year 2000.

From 2000 to 2004, Foray was a principal analyst at the Organization of Economic Cooperation and Development. From 2004 to 2008, he was the dean of the Collège du Management de la Technologie.

== Research ==
Foray's research interests include the economics of science and technology, the economics of production and distribution of knowledge, the exploration of the tension between diversity and standardization in the past and in the present, and the analysis of path-dependent processes of economic change.

== Bibliography ==
=== Books ===
- Foray, Dominique (2000). Economics of Knowledge. Cambridge: The MIT Press. ISBN 0262062399.
- Foray, Dominique (2015). Smart Specialisation: Opportunities and Challenges for Regional Innovation Policy. London: Routledge. ISBN 9781138923652.
