= Matthias Finger =

Swiss and French political scientist

Professor Matthias Finger
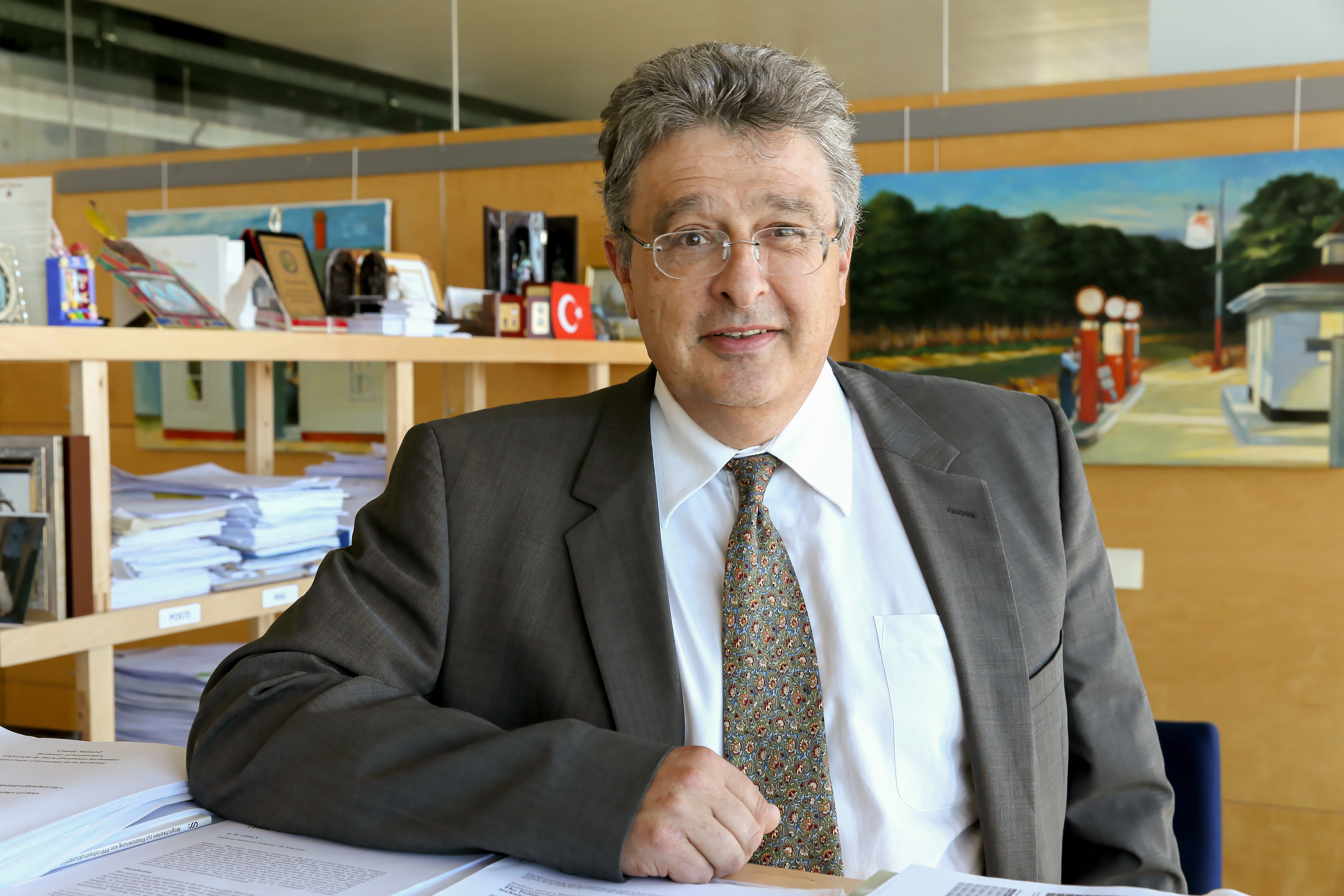
- Matthias Finger in 2020
- Born: 1955 (age 70–71)

Academic background
- Education: Political science
- Alma mater: University of Geneva

Academic work
- Institutions: École Polytechnique Fédérale de Lausanne (EPFL)
- Main interests: Education; Political science
- Website: https://mir.epfl.ch/

Matthias Finger (born 1955) is a Swiss and French political and educational scientist. He was a professor of management of network industries at EPFL (École Polytechnique Fédérale de Lausanne).

== Career ==
He received his PhD in education in 1986 and his PhD in political science in 1988, both from the University of Geneva. After having been Assistant Professor at Syracuse University, New York (1989–1991) and Associate Professor at Columbia University, New York (1992–1994), Matthias Finger was appointed Full Professor at the Swiss Graduate School of Public Administration (IDHEAP) in Lausanne in 1995. This is where he developed his research on the transformation of the network industries in the postal, the telecommunications, the railways, the electricity, the air transport, and the water sectors.

Matthias Finger was appointed Full Professor at the Swiss Federal Institute of Technology in October 2002 and Dean of Continuing Education in May 2003. Prof. Finger was the Academic Program Director of Executive Master in e-Governance and the Dean, School of Continuing Education in College of Management of Technology in EPFL. In July 2020, he retired from his functions at EPFL.

== Research ==
His research reconciles the liberalization of these sectors with public service objectives by means of new regulatory arrangements, while at the same time promoting a more entrepreneurial behavior of the operators.

== Selected works ==
- Pytlik, Nathalie; Kaden, Janine; Finger, Matthias; Naumann, Julia; Wanke, Stefan; Machill, Susanne; Brunner, Eike (2017). "Biological synthesis of gold nanoparticles by the diatom Stephanopyxis turris and in vivo SERS analyses". Algal Research. 28: 9–15. Bibcode:2017AlgRe..28....9P. doi:10.1016/j.algal.2017.10.004.
- Montero, Juan J.; Finger, Matthias (2017). "Platformed! Network industries and the new digital paradigm". Competition and Regulation in Network Industries. 18 (3–4): 217–239. doi:10.1177/1783591718782310. S2CID 169923999.
- Heininen, Lassi; Finger, Matthias (2018). "The "Global Arctic" as a New Geopolitical Context and Method". Journal of Borderlands Studies. 33 (2): 199–202. doi:10.1080/08865655.2017.1315605. S2CID 148875764.
- Razaghi, Mohamad; Finger, Matthias (2018). "Smart Governance for Smart Cities". Proceedings of the IEEE. 106 (4): 680–689. doi:10.1109/JPROC.2018.2807784. S2CID 4569785.
- Rentsch, Carole; Sulger, Philippe; Finger, Matthias (2017). "Major public enterprises in Switzerland". Economia Pubblica (3): 51–88. doi:10.3280/EP2016-003003.
- Rentsch, Carole; Finger, Matthias (2015). "Yes, No, Maybe: The Ambiguous Relationships Between State-Owned Enterprises and the State". Annals of Public and Cooperative Economics. 86 (4): 617–640. doi:10.1111/apce.12096. S2CID 56252002.
- Crettenand, Nicolas; Kenfack, Joseph; Finger, Matthias (2015). "Towards Becoming an Emerging Country with a Performing Electricity Sector – the Case of Cameroon". Competition and Regulation in Network Industries. 16 (2): 129–154. doi:10.1177/178359171501600204. S2CID 155574048.
- d'Arcy, Anne; Finger, Matthias (2014). "The Challenges of Imperfectly Unbundled TSOs: Can Corporate Governance or Regulatory Action Mitigate Such Imperfection?". Competition and Regulation in Network Industries. 15 (2): 117–137. doi:10.1177/178359171401500202. S2CID 153082008.
