= Growth platforms =

Aspect of business management

Growth platforms are specific initiatives selected by a business organization to increase their revenue and earnings growth. There are two types of growth platforms: strategic or tactical. Strategic growth platforms usually take from 3 to 6 years to implement and give the desired results being long term initiatives. On the other hand, Tactical growth platforms take less time to implement as they are shorter term initiatives and both the initiative and the results are based on the current budget year of the particular business.

== Stages of growth strategy ==
There are three stages in implementing a growth planning process which are based on three basic questions:

1. "Where are we now?"
2. "Where do we want to go?"
3. "How do we get to here?"

Strategic analysis: referred to the environment (which could either be internal, external and marketing) where the business operated. It also looked at the resources possessed by the business or that it could possibly have and at the expectations and objectives of its main stakeholders and owners.

Strategic choice: it basically generates options which have to do with the strategic analysis. This process evaluates the options based on acceptability, feasibility and suitability and then selects the suitable strategy

Strategic implementation: this process focus on achieving the correct organisational structure, planning the resources (physical and financial) and sorting out the systems and the people by implementing the change process. This process has been developing and it can be considered one of the few "big company" management theories which can be used effectively and simply.

Most businesses have a growth strategy which is based on "acquisitions and partnerships that create shareholder value by creating or reinforcing platforms for long-term growth".

== Growth sustainability ==
When a business is in a high-growth industry it is able to maintain high growth rates for a longer period of time. However, many investors take this high growth as granted which usually lead to much slower growth rates once the industry stops booming. It is believed that 65% of acquisitions which businesses buy in order to grow in size have destroyed more value than they actually created, an acquisition can’t be a substitute for a growth platform.

New growth platforms help companies grow as they created families of products, services, and businesses and extend their capabilities into multiple new domains. The NGPs acted as a method of growth in which each business was acquiring new capabilities and further market knowledge. The size of the growth platform is strategic to the corporation. Small scaled businesses can only have a NGP when provided through a partnership or government funding, usually these exist in the agricultural sector and improve the knowledge and infrastructure ensuring better food security.

== New growth platforms (NGPs) ==
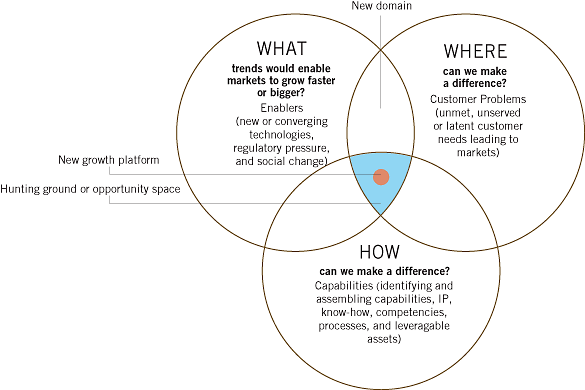
Opportunities for building NGPs lie at the intersection of a company’s actual or potential capability set, unmet customer needs, and forces of change in the broader environment.

=== Creating a new growth platform ===
Rediscovering the technology and the talent present in an organization a company or exploring its external networks, a business is able to find capabilities needed to create a new growth platform. Then a company should evaluate the potential capabilities which it needs to develop. Companies tend to undermine the number of possible growth platforms that could be created to increase customer needs. This is a consequence of senior managers not thinking more broadly and only thinking about a product or service that would beat the competition. After identifying suitable new areas of growth, a business needs to quantify and evaluate the opportunities to generate the lines of the business. In order to meet a new or uncovered customer need a new growth platform has to form as a result of a force of change which include new technologies, social pressures or changes in the legal system.

=== Possible places for growth ===
In order to generate an opportunity for sustained growth a business needs to widen its capabilities into innovative domains. NGPs provide a structure for creating business processes, services and even families of products. The size of each NGP is essential to the strategy of the organization. A successful NGP requires "a well tried process, high quality information and external insights – often from well outside the company’s own market space".

=== Difficulties in finding a new growth platform ===
Some studies have shown that more than 90% of companies are not able to find new possible sources of growth. Through the understanding of these difficulties, it makes it simpler to deal with the problem. Many argue that poor processes and skills lead to this high failure rate. Consequently, the main advice given to these companies is to be willing to take more risks and do the same "approaches used in the venture capital industry and build a pipeline of new businesses". It has been detected that the success of companies lies in new growth areas which have existing mindsets fitting the critical success factors of the business. Therefore, failure results when the company involves with factors that do not fit when the company is trying to grow in different new areas. The low success rate of finding a new growth platform can also be explained by the shortage of opportunities theory, which suggests a new way of resolving the problem. This theory proposes that "efforts to generate additional ideas or to experiment with a portfolio of new ventures are likely to be fruitless". In addition, failure can also be caused by less risk aversion and more broadmindedness of entrepreneurship. In order to resolve this issue the corporate mindsets need to change or investing only in cases that match with what is needed having a high chance of succeeding.

== Examples of growth platforms ==
Examples of strategic growth platforms which in these cases are using specific and innovative product areas or entering into a new distribution channel:

- In order to increase growth, Apple Computers targeted “personal music systems” using its personal business of computers
- IBM invented the term "e-business" and used it as the organizing theme of what the company did during the late 1990s

Examples of tactical growth platforms include specific new sales force programs or a new emphasis for the advertising for the year.

== See also ==
- Growth investing
- Strategic management
- Strategy of unbalanced growth
