= Alexander Osterwalder =

Swiss business theorist

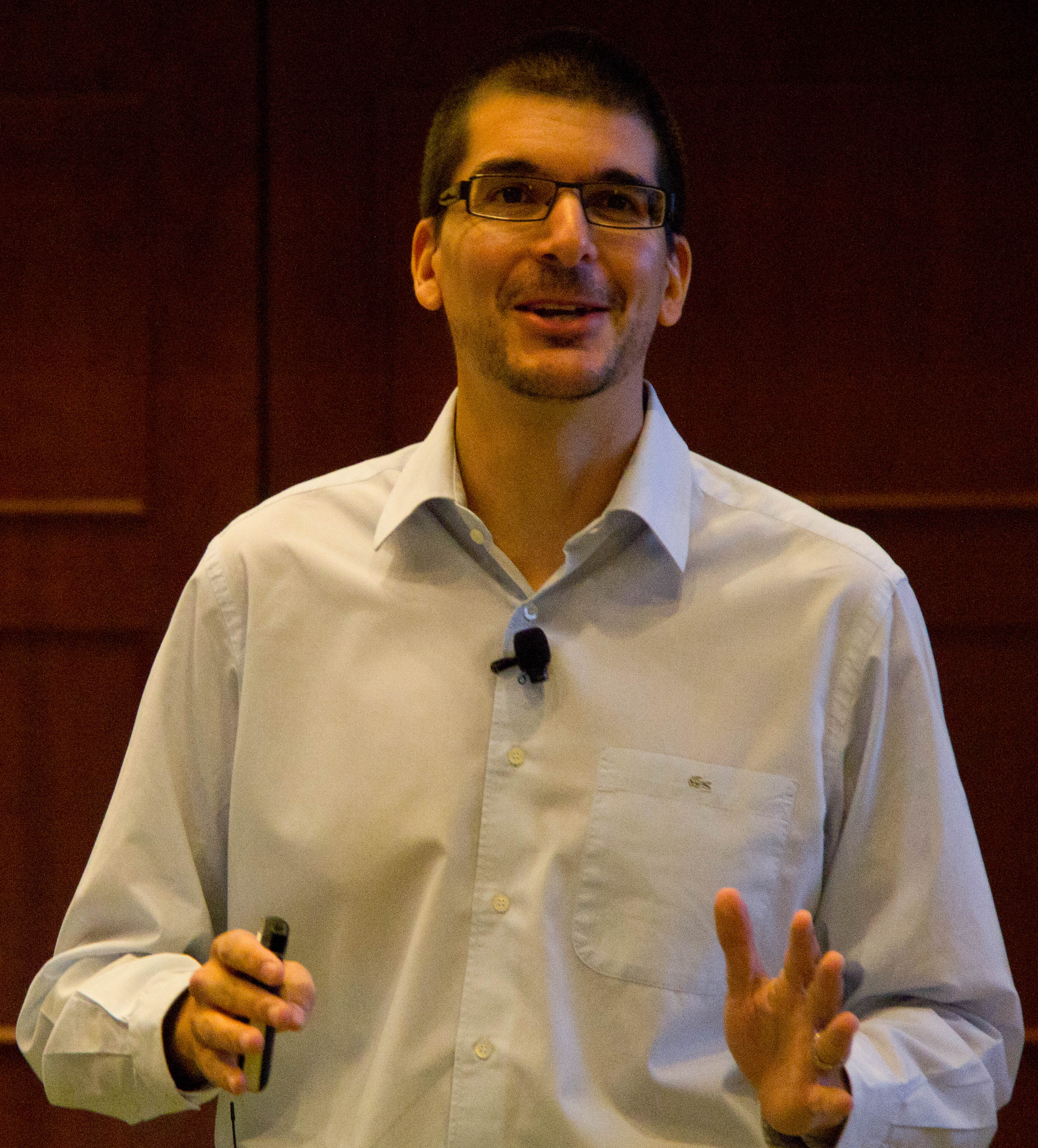
Alexander Osterwalder at the Business of Software 2011 conference

Alexander Osterwalder (born 1974) is a Swiss business theorist, author, speaker, consultant, and entrepreneur, known for his work on business modeling and the development of the Business Model Canvas.

== Biography ==
Born 1974 in St. Gallen, Osterwalder obtained his MA in Political Science in 2000 at the University of Lausanne, where in 2004 he also obtained his PhD in Management Information Systems under Yves Pigneur with the thesis, entitled "The Business Model Ontology - a proposition in a design science approach."

In 1999 Osterwalder co-founded his first startup Netfinance.ch, which focused on financial literacy. He was a journalist for the Swiss business magazine BILANZ in 2000–01, and Senior Research Fellow back at the University of Lausanne from 2000 to 2005 in the time he finished his PhD research. In 2006 he founded BusinessModelDesign.com, and in 2010 he co-founded the consultancy firm Strategyzer, which has provided over 5 million people with Osterwalder's Business Model Canvas.

In the late 2000s Osterwalder and a team of 470 co-creators published a model for describing business models: the Business Model Canvas. The Business Model Canvas seeks to offer a model to further develop ideas about the business model for monetizing data.

== Selected publications ==
- Osterwalder, Alexander et al. "The business model ontology: A proposition in a design science approach." (2004).
- Osterwalder, Alexander, and Yves Pigneur. Business Model Generation: A Handbook For Visionaries, Game Changers, And Challengers. Wiley, 2010.
- Osterwalder, Alexander, et al. Value Proposition Design: How to Create Products and Services Customers Want. Wiley, 2014.
- Bland, David and Osterwalder, Alexander. Testing Business Ideas: A Field Guide for Rapid Experimentation. Wiley, 2019.
- Osterwalder, Alexander, et al. The Invincible Company: How to Constantly Reinvent Your Organization with Inspiration From the World's Best Business Models. Wiley, 2020.
- Osterwalder, Alexander, et al. High Impact Tools for Teams: How to boost alignment, accountability and get results in fast-paced, uncertain and complex projects. Wiley, 2021.

Articles, a selection:

- Osterwalder, Alexander, and Yves Pigneur. "An eBusiness model ontology for modeling eBusiness." BLED 2002 Proceedings (2002): 2.
- Dubosson-Torbay, Magali, Alexander Osterwalder, and Yves Pigneur. "E-business model design, classification, and measurements." Thunderbird International Business Review 44.1 (2002): 5-23.
- Osterwalder, Alexander, Yves Pigneur, and Christopher L. Tucci. "Clarifying business models: Origins, present, and future of the concept." Communications of the association for Information Systems 16.1 (2005): 1.
