= Andrew Metrick =

American economist

Academic background
- Education: Harvard (Ph.D. 1994); Yale College (B.A. 1989, M.A. 1989)
- Influences: James Tobin; Eric Maskin

Academic work
- Discipline: Financial economics
- Institutions: Yale School of Management
- Notable ideas: Financial Crises; Financial Stability; Macroproduential Regulation; Shadow banking system
- Scientific career
- Thesis: Natural experiments in games (1994)
- Doctoral advisor: Eric Maskin
- Website: Information at IDEAS / RePEc

Andrew Metrick is an American economist who is the current Janet L. Yellen Professor of Finance and Management at the Yale School of Management. His research has touched on topics including game theory, venture capital and private equity, and most recently on financial stability. He is also the director of the Yale Program on Financial Stability.

== Education ==
Metrick graduated from Yale in 1989 with a joint bachelor's and master's degree in economics. While an undergraduate at Yale, Metrick was a research assistant for Nobel Laureate and Sterling Professor of Economics and Finance James Tobin for three years. Metrick received his Ph.D. in economics from Harvard in 1994, where his advisor was Eric Maskin, who won the Nobel Prize in Economics in 2007.

== Academic ==
After receiving his Ph.D., Metrick worked as an assistant professor at Harvard for five years. His dissertation and early work focused on how individuals made decisions. When he moved to Wharton as an assistant professor in 1999, he transitioned to concentrate on writing finance papers.

In January 2008, Metrick moved to the Yale School of Management. At Yale, he was a professor of finance until 2009 when he became the Theodore Nierenberg Professor of Corporate Governance. He became the Michael H. Jordan Professor of Finance and Management in 2011 and the Janet L. Yellen Professor of Finance and Management in 2018. Metrick served as Deputy Dean of the Yale School of Management from 2010 to 2016.

Beginning in 2008, Metrick has focused on studying financial crises. In August 2009, Metrick joined the Council of Economic Advisers as the senior economist for finance, where he worked on policy related to the 2008 financial crisis and the Great Recession, including what would become the Dodd–Frank Wall Street Reform and Consumer Protection Act. He was promoted to Chief Economist at the Council of Economic Advisers in 2010.

Metrick has published in The American Economic Review, The Quarterly Journal of Economics, and The Journal of Finance. He became a National Bureau of Economic Research research fellow in 1998, and a research associate in 2009. He has also co-organized the "Macro, Money and Financial Frictions" meeting at the NBER Summer Institute. Metrick also served as a director of the American Finance Association from 2014 to 2016, and as a member of the Financial Research Advisory Committee for the Office of Financial Research.

== Yale Program on Financial Stability ==
After his work with the CEA, Metrick established the Yale Program on Financial Stability, a research group with a mission "to create, disseminate, and preserve knowledge about financial crises." Metrick has been the Director of the Yale Program on Financial Stability since its founding and has overseen its creation of the Systemic Risk Symposium, its annual Financial Crises Academic Conference, and its annual Financial Crisis Forum for senior central bankers. In 2017, Metrick led the Yale Program on Financial Stability in raising $10 million from Jeff Bezos, Bill Gates, Michael Bloomberg, and Peter G. Peterson. The donation supported the Yale Program on Financial Stability's effort to catalog past financial crises and the policy actions associated with them.

As part of his work for the Yale Program on Financial Stability, he has also overseen the creation of the first of its kind masters program in systemic risk at the Yale School of Management, taught the MBA and undergraduate course "The Global Financial Crisis" with former Treasury Secretary Timothy F. Geithner. He also created an online Coursera class joint with former Treasury Secretary Timothy F. Geithner titled "The Global Financial Crisis." The Coursera class had 30,000 active learners as of June 2017, and 3,000 course completers.

With the financial historian Paul Schmelzing, Metrick constructed the largest existing banking crisis intervention data base which catalogues types of policy responses during financial distress events around the globe spanning the time from the late Renaissance to the present. The resulting "Metrick-Schmelzing" data base contains more than 900 banking crises and is publicly available as of 2025.
