= OGSM =

Goal setting and action plan framework

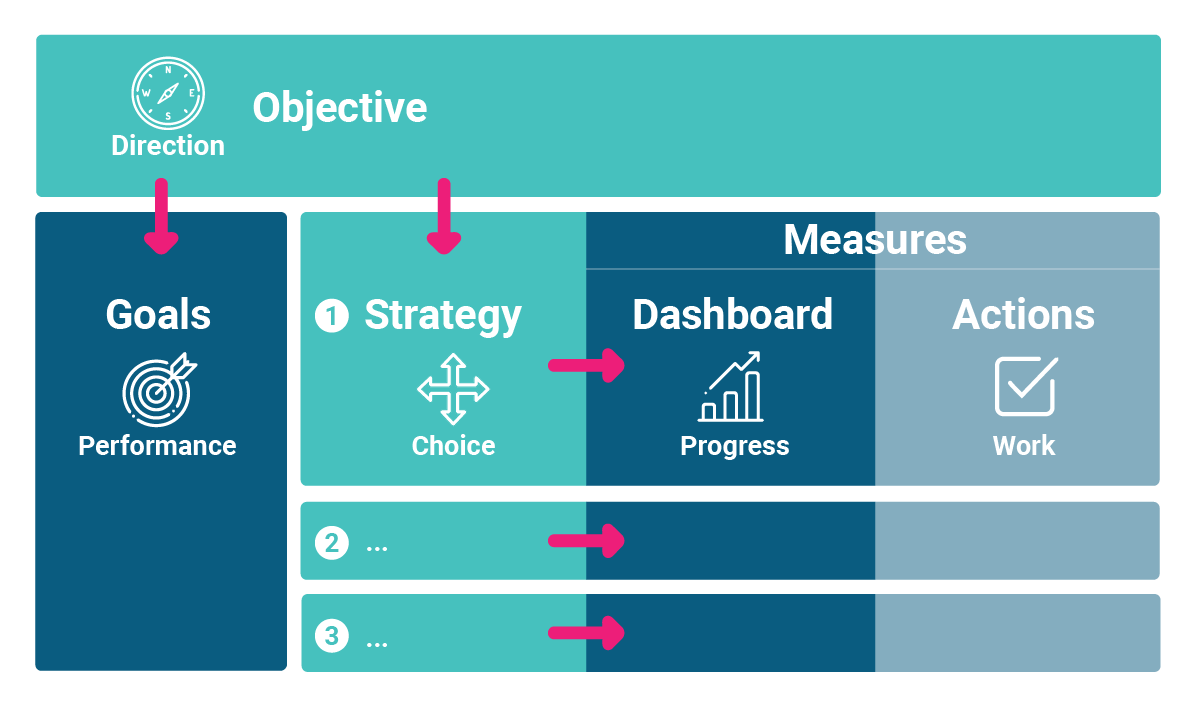
OGSM canvas layout

Objective, goals, strategies and measures (OGSM) is a goal setting and action plan framework used in strategic planning. It is used by organizations, departments, teams and sometimes program managers to define and track measurable goals and actions to achieve an objective. Documenting your goals, strategies and actions all on one page gives insights that can be missing with other frameworks. It defines the measures that will be followed to ensure that goals are met and helps groups work together toward common objectives, across functions, geographical distance and throughout the organization. OGSM's origins can be traced back to Japan in the 1950s, stemming from the process and strategy work developed during the occupation of Japan in the post-World War II period. It has since been adopted by many Fortune 500 companies. In particular, Procter & Gamble uses the process to align the direction of their multinational corporation around the globe.

== Purpose ==
The OGSM framework forms the basis for strategic planning and execution, as well as a strong management routine that keep the plan part of the day-to-day operations. It aligns the leaders to the objective of the company, links key strategies to the financial goals, and brings visibility and accountability to the work of improving the capabilities of the company. Due to the concise format (usually one page) and simple color-coding to signal progress, OGSM allows for quick management by exception of any underperforming activity or underperforming (key) performance indicator. And finally, it is simple, robust and developed as a team.

OGSM is designed to identify strategic priorities, capture market opportunities, optimize resources, enhance speed and execution, and align team members. Each component of OGSM plays a distinct role: the Objective sets a qualitative ambition, Goals are quantitative targets, Strategies are the key approaches to reach the goals, and Measures define how progress is tracked and translated in to concrete action.

== History ==
Research indicates that the OGSM method was developed by Procter & Gamble, but the verifiable origins of OGSM remain unclear.

Brought from Japan to corporate America in the 1950s, the OGSM concept was used initially by car manufacturers. Today, larger corporations, including Fortune 500 companies, employ this framework to keep their workforces centered on goals and objectives. Ideally, this tool attempts to express in one page what a traditional business plan takes 50 pages to explain.

== Development in the U.S. ==
The OGSM has been employed by multinational corporations around the globe, including but not limited to:

- Coca-Cola Company
- Procter & Gamble
- KPN
- Royal FloraHolland
- Reckitt Benckiser
- Honda
- Mars
- MetLife
- Triumph International

Procter & Gamble (P&G) provides an example of how these ideas translate into organizational practice. A.G. Lafley, the CEO of P&G, uses the OGSM tool (as illustrated in OGSM § Considerations) to provide a framework for organizing the discussion about goals and strategic direction. While notably implemented at fortune 500 companies, startups and SMBs also use OGSMs to create strategic alignment.

== See also ==
- SMART criteria
