= Business plan =

Formal written document containing the goals of a business

A business plan is a formal written document containing the goals of a business, the methods for attaining those goals, and the time-frame for the achievement of the goals. It also describes the nature of the business, background information on the organization, the organization's financial projections, and the strategies it intends to implement to achieve the stated targets. In its entirety, this document serves as a road-map (a plan) that provides direction to the business.

Written business plans are often required to obtain a bank loan or other kind of financing. Templates and guides, such as the ones offered in the United States by the Small Business Administration can be used to facilitate producing a business plan.

== Audience ==
Business plans may be internally or externally focused. Externally-focused plans draft goals that are important to outside stakeholders, particularly financial stakeholders. These plans typically have detailed information about the organization or the team making effort to reach its goals. With for-profit entities, external stakeholders include investors and customers. For non-profits, external stakeholders refer to donors and clients. For government agencies, external stakeholders are taxpayers, higher-level government agencies, and international lending bodies such as the International Monetary Fund, the World Bank, various economic agencies of the United Nations, and development banks.

Internally-focused business plans target intermediate goals required to reach the external goals. They may cover the development of a new product, a new service, a new IT system, a restructuring of finance, the refurbishing of a factory or the restructuring of an organization. An internally-focused business plan is often developed in conjunction with a balanced scorecard or OGSM or a list of critical success factors. This allows the success of the plan to be measured using non-financial measures.

Business plans that identify and target internal goals, but provide only general guidance on how they will be met are called strategic plans.

Operational plans describe the goals of an internal working group or department. Project plans, sometimes known as project frameworks, describe the goals of a particular project. They may also address the project's place within the organization's larger strategic goals.

== Content ==
Business plans are decision-making tools. The content and format of the business plan are determined by the goals and audience. For example, a business plan for a non-profit might discuss the fit between the business plan and the organization's mission. A business plan for a bank loan will demonstrate the organization's ability to repay the loan. A business plan for a project requiring equity financing will explain how current resources, anticipated growth opportunities, and sustainable competitive advantage will lead to a high exit valuation.

Preparing a business plan draws on a wide range of knowledge from different business disciplines: finance, human resource management, intellectual property management, supply chain management, operations management, and marketing, among others. It can be helpful to view the business plan as a collection of sub-plans, one for each of the main business disciplines.

"... a good business plan can help to make a good business credible, understandable, and attractive to someone who is unfamiliar with the business. Writing a good business plan can't guarantee success, but it can go a long way toward reducing the odds of failure."

The creation of a business plan may begin with laying out the primary business concept, followed by gathering data regarding feasibility, including specific details about what the business entails. Once the details are outlined and the business's function and objectives are clear, a formal business plan is prepared and presented to potential investors.

== Presentation ==
The format of a business plan depends on its presentation context. It is common for businesses, especially start-ups, to have three or four formats for the same business plan.

An "elevator pitch" is a short summary of the plan's executive summary. This is often used as a teaser to awaken the interest of potential investors, customers, or strategic partners. It is called an elevator pitch as it is supposed to be content that can be explained to someone else quickly in an elevator. The elevator pitch should be between 30 and 60 seconds.

A pitch deck is a slide show and oral presentation that is meant to trigger discussion and interest potential investors in reading the written presentation. The content of the presentation is usually limited to the executive summary and a few key graphs showing financial trends and key decision-making benchmarks. If a new product is being proposed and time permits, a demonstration of the product may be included.

An internal operational plan is a detailed plan describing planning details that are needed by management but may not be of interest to external stakeholders. Such plans have a somewhat higher degree of candor and informality than the version targeted at external stakeholders and others.

== Business plans for start-ups ==
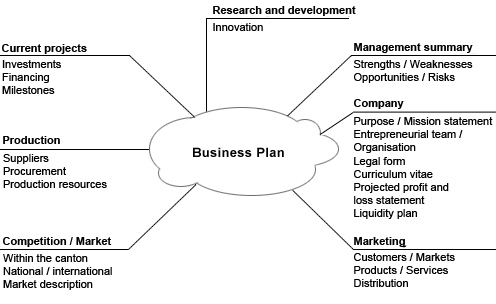

Typical structure for a business plan for a start-up venture

- cover page and table of contents
- executive summary
- mission statement
- business description
- business environment analysis
- SWOT analysis
- industry background
- competitor analysis
- market analysis
- marketing plan
- operations plan
- management summary
- financial projections plan
- achievements and milestones

== Revising the business plan ==
=== Cost overruns and revenue shortfalls ===
Cost and revenue estimates are central to any business plan for deciding the viability of the planned venture. But costs are often underestimated and revenues overestimated resulting in later cost overruns, revenue shortfalls, and possibly non-viability. During the dot-com bubble 1997-2001 this was a problem for many technology start-ups. Reference class forecasting has been developed to reduce the risks of cost overruns and revenue shortfalls and thus generate more accurate business plans.

== Uses ==
- Education
  - Business plans are used in some primary and secondary programs to teach economic principles.

- Wikiversity has a Lunar Boom Town project where students of all ages can collaborate with designing and revising business models and practice evaluating them to learn practical business planning techniques and methodology

- Fundraising

Fundraising is the primary purpose of many business plans since they are related to the inherent probable success/failure of the company risk.

- Angel investors
- Business loans
- Grants
- Startup company funding
- Venture capital

- Internal use

- Management by objectives (MBO) is a process of agreeing upon objectives (as can be detailed within business plans) within an organization so that management and employees agree to the objectives and understand what they are in the organization.
- Strategic planning is an organization's process of defining its strategy, or direction, and making decisions on allocating its resources to pursue this strategy, including its capital and people. Business plans can help decision-makers see how specific projects relate to the organization's strategic plan.
- Total quality management (TQM) is a business management strategy aimed at embedding awareness of quality in all organizational processes. TQM has been widely used in manufacturing, education, call centers, government, and service industries, as well as NASA space and science programs.

== Not for-profit businesses ==
The business goals may be defined both for non-profit or for-profit organizations. For-profit business plans typically focus on financial goals, such as profit or creation of wealth. Nonprofit business plans address the organization's mission and the income needed to support its activities.

The key distinction between for-profit and non-profit organizations lies in their core objectives. For-profit organizations aim to maximize wealth, while non-profits focus on serving the greater good of society. In non-profits, a creative tension often arises as they strive to balance their mission-driven goals with the need to generate revenue or maintain financial sustainability.

== See also ==
- Business case
- Business Motivation Model
- Cost-benefit analysis
- Entrepreneurship
- Financial accounting
- Optimism bias
- Parkinson's Law of Triviality
- Revenue shortfall
