= European Financial Reporting Advisory Group =

Private association based in Belgium

- Formation: 2001
- Type: Private association
- Headquarters: Brussels, Belgium
- Location: European Union
- Website: www.efrag.org

The European Financial Reporting Advisory Group is a private association established in 2001 with the encouragement of the European Commission to serve the public interest. Its Member Organisations are European stakeholders and National Organisations having knowledge and interest in the development of International Financial Reporting Standards and how they contribute to the efficiency of capital markets. In 2022, the group extended its mission to providing technical advice to the European Commission in the form of fully prepared drafts of EU Sustainability Reporting Standards (CSRD).

== Mission statement ==
EFRAG's mission is to develop and promote European views in a thought leadership role and to ensure that they are properly taken into account in the IASB standard setting process. EFRAG hears all views and of all specific circumstances originating in Europe and synthesises these to speak convincingly, clearly and consistently, as the European Voice in Financial Reporting, building its legitimacy on its governance, due process and public accountability. EFRAG carries its assessments of IFRS throughout the standard setting process. It ultimately provides advice to the European Commission as to whether IFRS meets the IAS Regulation endorsement criteria for use in the preparation of accounts in the EU. This assessment includes whether endorsing the newly issued or revised IFRS would be conducive to the European public good.

EFRAG's mission is carried out "with the encouragement of the European Commission to serve the public interest".

== Public accountability ==
Public accountability is ensured on the one hand by EFRAG's governance and on the other by EFRAG's due process. EFRAG is accountable to the public at large and the European institutions through its open and transparent due process; including public consultation on its positions; transparency of EFRAG's work; public meetings of the EFRAG Technical Expert Group and of the EFRAG Board, EFRAG Board public agenda papers and open nomination processes. EFRAG publishes every year an Annual Review discussing its activities and presenting financials of the past year. The funding by the European Commission brings enhanced scrutiny of EFRAG's activities and expenses, including the publication of audited annual accounts and detailed activity reports to the European Commission.
