= Cost leadership =

In business strategy, cost leadership is a strategy aiming to establish a competitive advantage by having the lowest cost of operation in the industry. The concept is one of the generic business strategies developed by Michael Porter.

A cost leadership strategy aims to exploit scale of production, well-defined scope and other economies (e.g., a good purchasing approach), producing highly standardized products, using advanced technology. In recent years, more and more companies have chosen a strategic mix to achieve market leadership. These patterns consist of simultaneous cost leadership, superior customer service and product leadership. For example, US retailer Walmart has succeeded in business due to its cost leadership strategy. The company has cut down on excesses at every point of production and thus are able to provide the consumers with quality products at low prices. Adopting a low-cost production strategy can prove particularly advantageous in markets characterized by a high proportion of price-sensitive buyers and limited avenues for product differentiation. Cost leadership is often driven by company efficiency, size, scale, scope and cumulative experience (learning curve).

Cost leadership is different from price leadership. A company could be the lowest cost producer yet not offer the lowest-priced products or services. If so, that company would have a higher than average profitability. However, cost leader companies do compete on price and are very effective at such a form of competition, having a low cost structure and management.

Other aspects of cost leadership include tight operational controls across the business, avoidance of customers whose needs incur additional costs, and limits on expenditure in areas such as advertising and customer service.
