= Yves Pigneur =

Belgian computer scientist

Yves Pigneur (born 1954) is a Belgian computer scientist, and Professor of Management Information Systems at the University of Lausanne since 1984, known for his work on the business model canvas with Alexander Osterwalder. He is considered a "mastermind" among business strategics, his canvas have been used by numerous companies such as P&G, Amazon, Lockheed Martin and Tesla.

== Biography ==
Pigneur obtained his PhD in Information Systems in 1984 at the Université de Namur under François Bodart.

Pigneur had started his academic career as Assistant Professor at the Université de Namur in 1977. After his graduation he was appointed Professor of Management Information Systems at the University of Lausanne in 1984. He was at Visiting professor at the National University of Singapore in 2012, at the HEC Montréal in 2013, at the Georgia State University, and the University of British Columbia.

Pigneur authored and co-authored a series of books and articles since the 1980s, and became globally known as co-author with Alexander Osterwalder of the 2010 book Business Model Generation. Pigneur and Osterwalder are considered one of the world’s 50 most influential management thinkers.

They placed 15th on The Thinkers50 Ranking 2015 and 7th in 2017, a list drawn up every two years and described by The Financial Times as the “Oscars of management thinking.” They also received one of the 11 Distinguished Achievement Awards (in the “Strategy” category) in 2015.

== Selected publications ==
- François Bodart, Yves Pigneur. Conception assistée des applications informatiques, Volume 1. Masson, 1983.
- Osterwalder, Alexander, and Yves Pigneur. Business Model Generation: A Handbook For Visionaries, Game Changers, And Challengers. Wiley, 2010.

Articles, a selection:

- Bodart, F., Hennebert, A. M., Leheureux, J. M., & Pigneur, Y. (1985). "Computer-aided specification, evaluation, and monitoring of information systems." In Proceedings of the 1985 International Conference on Information Systems (pp. 27–44).
- Osterwalder, Alexander, and Yves Pigneur. "An eBusiness model ontology for modeling eBusiness." BLED 2002 Proceedings (2002): 2.
- Dubosson‐Torbay, Magali, Alexander Osterwalder, and Yves Pigneur. "E‐business model design, classification, and measurements." Thunderbird International Business Review 44.1 (2002): 5-23.
- Osterwalder, Alexander, Yves Pigneur, and Christopher L. Tucci. "Clarifying business models: Origins, present, and future of the concept." Communications of the association for Information Systems 16.1 (2005): 1.
