= Analysis of Alternatives =

The Analysis of Alternatives (AoA) in the United States is a requirement of military acquisition policy, as controlled by the Office of Management and Budget (OMB) and the United States Department of Defense (DoD). It ensures that at least three feasible alternatives are analyzed prior to making costly investment decisions. The AoA establishes and benchmarks metrics for Cost, Schedule, Performance (CSP) and Risk (CSPR) depending on military "needs" derived from the Joint Capabilities Integration Development System process. It moves away from employing a single acquisition source to the exploration of multiple alternatives so agencies have a basis for funding the best possible projects in a rational, defensible manner considering risk and uncertainty.

== Methodology ==
The AoA assesses critical technology elements (CTEs) associated with each proposed materiel solution, identified in the Initial Capabilities Document (ICD), including; technology maturity, integration risk, manufacturing feasibility, and, where necessary, technology maturation and demonstration needs. An AoA begins by establishing or modifying Key Performance Parameters (KPPs) metrics for each alternative. These metrics help compare the operational effectiveness, suitability, and life cycle costs of alternatives to satisfy the military need.

== Process ==
DoD Instruction 5000.02 requires an AoA in support of each decision milestone: The Milestone Decision Authority (MDA) directs a study team to accomplish the AoA; the AoA then becomes the primary input to the documents for development of a weapons acquisition program. The results of the analysis provide the basis for the Technology Development Strategy (TDS), which must be approved by the MDA at program's Milestone A.^{†} The AoA is executed before any solution is determined, and is updated throughout the life of the program.

The AoA attempts to arrive at the best value for a set of proposals received from the private sector or other sources. Though Source Selection criteria change per proposal request, and specifics are considered sensitive information, there is usually some form of the Cost Schedule Performance (CSP) trade-space analysis, and strong consideration of Risk, (CSPR). Performance is measured in terms of Measures of Effectiveness (MOEs), metrics aligned with established requirements (such as Essential Elements of Information (EEIs)) and new capabilities. Risk is analyzed in many ways, such as technological maturity, manufacturing capacity, quality standards, manufacturing design, material and supply chain capacity, interoperability, operational survival, aggressiveness of the schedule, cost reasonableness, among many others. Each MOE and capability may carry an associated risk.

Risks that affect cost may be evaluated separately from risks affecting an alternative’s schedule and MOEs. The risk from each alternative's capabilities assumes that every unattained MOE and new capability has some associated risk.

According to the Office of Aerospace Studies, the AoA is the focus of Concept and Technology Development Phase (CTDP). The AoA is designed to examine a broad spectrum of potential alternatives to the mission need described in the Mission Needs Statement. The key purpose of the AoA is to identify a "solution" that will fulfill the stated requirements as optimally as possible commensurate with established cost and schedule constraints, at the lowest practicable risk. The "solution" may be a specific design or configuration but it is more than likely to be a set of design parameter values the combination of which would provide the most optimal and desirable means of fulfilling the stated requirements. Thus, any specific design that complies with the optimal "solution" parameter values is deemed acceptable. The objectives of the AoA are to:

- Refine alternatives
- Refine criteria
- Refine evaluation
- Work to gain consensus
- Reduce uncertainty
- Choose an alternative

The AoA and its associated documentation, is required before any major investment decision and before each decision milestone, is therefore one of the most important steps in the military acquisition process.

== See also ==
- Capability (systems engineering)
- Department of Defense Architecture Framework

== AoA Related Documentation ==
- Acquisition Program Baseline (APB)
- Defense Acquisition Guide
- Integrated Logistics Support Plan (ILSP)
- Mission Need Statement (MNS) became the Initial Capabilities Document (ICD) for Milestone A
- Operational Requirements Document (ORD) became the Capability Development Document for Milestone B and Capability Production Document for Milestone C
- Systems Engineering Management Plan (SEMP)
- Systems Engineering Plan (SEP)
- System Threat Assessment Report
  - Threat Assessment Report (TAR) for Air Force component programs, or
  - Threat Planning Document (TPD)
- Test and Evaluation Master Plan (TEMP)
- Single Acquisition Master Plan (SAMP)
