= Initial operating capability =

Military logistics terms

Initial operating capability or initial operational capability (IOC) is the state achieved when a capability is available in its minimum usefully deployable form. The term is often used in government or military procurement.

The United States Department of Defense chooses to use the term initial operational capability when referring to IOC. For a U.S. Department of Defense military acquisition, IOC includes operating the training and maintaining parts of the overall system per DOTMLPF, and is defined as:

"In general, attained when some units and/or organizations in the force structure scheduled to receive a system have received it and have the ability to employ and maintain it. The specifics for any particular system IOC are defined in that system’s Capability Development Document (CDD) and Capability Production Document (CPD)."

The date at which IOC is achieved often defines the in-service date (ISD) for an associated system. Declaration of an initial operating capability may imply that the capability will be developed in the future, for example by modifications or adjustments to improve the system's performance, deployment of greater numbers of systems (perhaps of different types), or testing and training that permit wider application of the capability. Once the capability is fully developed, full operational capability may be declared.

For example, the capability may be fielded to a limited number of users with plans to roll out to all users incrementally over a period (possibly incorporating changes along the way). The point at which the first users begin using the capability is IOC, with FOC achieved when all intended users (by agreement between the developer and the user) have the capability. This does not preclude additional users from obtaining the capability after FOC.

Alternatively the specifics of the program may cause a contract and acquisition-defined definition that differs from the concept of available in minimally deployable form, for example IOC on a website, which does not have material production or maintenance, may have been defined as when the training mockup is installed rather than when software or content is ready.

Finally, IOC may be an informal voiced usage of opinion on how far the development is, or a casual view that some other event constitutes IOC like when it is first turned on. (Both of these are meaningless to formal program state or contractual actions, but the progress or event are meaningful in other senses.)
