= Joint Capabilities Integration and Development System =

US DoD process

The Joint Capabilities Integration and Development System (JCIDS) was the formal United States Department of Defense (DoD) process which defines acquisition requirements and evaluation criteria for future defense programs. JCIDS was created to replace the previous service-specific requirements generation system that allowed redundancies in capabilities and failed to meet the combined needs of all US military services. In order to correct these problems, JCIDS is intended to guide the development of requirements for future acquisition systems to reflect the needs of all five services (Army, Navy, Marine Corps, Space Force and Air Force) by focusing the requirements generation process on needed capabilities as requested or defined by one of the US combatant commanders. In an ideal implementation of the JCIDS process, regional and functional combatant commanders would give early and continuous feedback into the acquisition and sustainment processes to ensure their current and evolving requirements are known and met. In August 2025, Secretary of Defense Pete Hegseth and Deputy Secretary of Defense Steve Feinberg "directed the Vice Chairman of the Joint Chiefs of Staff to immediately start the 'disestablishment' of JCIDS".

== History ==
JCIDS was developed under the direction of Secretary of Defense Donald Rumsfeld to address shortfalls in the United States Department of Defense (DoD) requirements generation system identified by the U.S. Joint Chiefs of Staff. These shortfalls were identified as: not considering new programs in the context of other programs, insufficiently considering combined service requirements and ineffectively prioritizing joint service requirements, and accomplishing insufficient analysis. The drive to create JCIDS was born out of a March 2002 Secretary of Defense memorandum to the vice chairman of the Joint Chiefs of Staff requesting a study on alternative ways to evaluate requirements. The chairman of the Joint Chiefs of Staff (CJCS) approved the most recent JCIDS Instruction on 23 January 2015 and its accompanying manual was released on 12 February 2015. CJCS Instruction (CJCSI) 3170.01I provides a top-level description of the process and outlines the organizational responsibilities. The JCIDS Manual defines performance attributes, key performance parameters, validation and approval processes, and associated document content.

== Methodology ==
The central focus of JCIDS is to address capability shortfalls, or gaps as defined by combatant commanders. Thus, JCIDS is said to provide a capabilities-based approach to requirements generation. The previous requirements generation system focused on addressing future threat scenarios. While understanding the risks associated with future threat postures is necessary to develop effective weapons systems, a sufficient methodology requires a joint perspective which can both prioritize the risk associated with future threats and consider operational gaps in the context of all the services. If requirements are developed in this joint context, there is simultaneously a smaller chance of developing superfluously overlapping systems and a greater probability that weapons systems would be operational with one another (i.e. common communication systems, weapons interfaces, etc.). The Joint Capability Areas were established in conjunction with JCIDS in order to provide for a common lexicon throughout the US Department of Defense. Another major emphasis of JCIDS is to consider whether a solution to a potential operational gap requires the development of a physical system (a materiel solution) or a procedural or training based solution (a non-materiel solution). In this sense, the JCIDS process provides a solution space that considers solutions involving any combination of doctrine, organization, training, materiel, leadership and education, personnel and facilities (DOTMLPF). The Joint Staff, J6, Joint Deployable Analysis Team (JDAT) supports JCIDS by providing recommendations based on quantifiable data. JDAT collects and analyzes data and provides observations, findings, conclusions, and recommendations to identify policy, Joint doctrine, tactics, techniques, and procedures (TTP); and materiel solutions and products that promote capability improvement. Since combatant commanders define requirements in consultation with the Office of the Secretary of Defense (OSD), they are able to consider gaps in the context of strategic direction for the total US military force and influence the direction of requirements earlier in the acquisition process.

The JCIDS process starts with the development of joint integrating concepts and the capability they imply from the US Secretary of Defense (SecDef) and combatant commanders. From the joint integrating concepts, the joint chiefs of staff refine requirements and develop an integrated priority list via a joint quarterly readiness review. Military judgement is further applied by the Joint Requirements Oversight Council (JROC) (Composed of the Vice Chairman of the Joint Chiefs of Staff and other service vice chiefs) which validates requirement attributes and determines how to produce the required capability. From the JROC, the JCIDS process maps current programs against the standard as defined by JROC attributes to determine if gaps exist in providing the concepts defined by the SecDef and combatant commanders.

== JCIDS analysis ==
In order to assess US capability to execute Joint Integrating Concepts there are three phases to capabilities-based assessment: a functional area analysis, a functional needs analysis, and a functional solutions analysis. The functional area analysis identifies operational tasks, conditions and standards needed to accomplish objectives. The Functional Needs Analysis assesses the ability of current and programmed capabilities to accomplish the tasks identified in the functional area analysis.

The end product of these first two levels of analysis is a list of capability gaps. Functional solutions analysis (FSA) evaluates solutions from an operational perspective across the DOTMLPF spectrum. The FSA results in a list of potential need-based solutions and is further divided into three subcomponents: non-materiel analysis (DOT_LPF), materiel solutions (ideas for materiel approaches, or IMA, analysis) and the Analysis of Materiel Approaches to determine the best materiel or combination of approaches to produce the best capability.

The final analysis is the Post-Independent Analysis which reviews the previous three functional analyses and selects an approach or approaches that best close the capability gaps. The original proposal sponsor documents a recommended change or produces an Initial Capabilities Document for a system.

A proposal receives one of three designations based on the degree in which it applies to all three services: "JROC Interest", "JCB Interest", or "Joint Information". "JROC Interest" programs apply to any program the JROC decides to review and all Acquisition Category (ACAT) 1/1A programs. [Based on 31 Aug 2018 JCIDS Manual.]

=== Army ACATs ===
The ASA(ALT) uses the Acquisition Category (ACAT) I, II, III, IV in its Weapon System Handbook.

== Output documents ==
Three documents are the output of the JCIDS analysis which together define needed capabilities, guide materiel development and direct the production of capabilities. Each of these documents supports a major design approval decision each with gradual improving design maturity A, B or C. The sponsor is the single focal point for all three documents. The Initial Capabilities Document (ICD) defines the capability need and where it fits in broader concepts, ultimately supporting the milestone A decision. (The Milestone A decision approves or denies a concept demonstration to show that a proposed concept is feasible). When the technology development phase is complete, a Capability Development Document (CDD) is produced which provides more detail on the materiel solution of the desired capability and supports Milestone B decisions. (The milestone B approval starts the engineering and manufacturing development phase). Most important, the CDD also defines the thresholds and objectives against which the capability will be measured. After approval, the CDD guides the Engineering and Manufacturing Development Phase of the acquisition process. The Capability Production Document (CPD) supports the Milestone C decision necessary to start the Production & Deployment Phase to include low-rate initial production and operational tests. The CPD potentially refines the thresholds from the CDD based on lessons learned during the Engineering and Manufacturing Development Phase.

== Actors ==
The DoD component that oversees the JCIDS analyses acts as the sponsor. The sponsor also evaluates the affordability of various proposals and approaches determined in the study. Moreover, the sponsor coordinates with non-DoD departments and agencies on interagency capability matters.

The Joint Staff, J8, Vice Director (VDJ-8), is the gatekeeper of the JCIDS process. The gatekeeper assigns the Joint Potential Designation (JPD), and assigns lead and supporting functional capabilities boards FCBs, and performs an initial review. The gatekeeper initially reviews all proposals, and then designates the JPD, and which Functional Capability Board and Joint Warfighting Capability Assessment Teams will receive the proposal. The Joint Potential Designation is based on input from Joint Forces Command, each of the Joint Warfighting Capability Assessment teams, and other elements of the Joint Staff. The gatekeeper periodically reevaluates the Joint Potential designation throughout the process because changes in the proposed capability may require it to change as well.

When the gatekeeper has completed the initial review, she or he assigns the analysis to a functional capabilities board (FCB). This board replaces the joint requirements panel (JRP) from the previous system, with expanded responsibilities and membership. The FCB is responsible for ensuring that new capabilities are developed with a joint warfighting context; ensuring that proposals are consistent with the Joint Force as described in the Joint Operating Concepts; validating Joint Impact proposals; organizing, analyzing and prioritizing capabilities proposals; supervising development and updating of functional concepts; and ensuring that integrated architectures are reflective of their functional area.

The JROC now charters six FCBs (oversight authority is in parentheses):

1. C4/Cyber (J6)
2. Battlespace Awareness (J2)
3. Force Application (J8)
4. Logistics (J4)
5. Protection (J8)
6. Force Integration (J8)

The head of the FCBs will probably be at least the O-7 or equivalent level. Membership in an FCB goes beyond the traditional membership of the services under the previous system in the JRP. The FCBs include O-6 or GS-15 equivalent representatives of the Services, the combatant commanders, key OSD staff, and representatives from the space and intelligence communities. This expanded membership gives the FCB Chairman the tools to make better and more broadly informed recommendations on the capability proposals to the JROC. It also involves the entire acquisition community early in the process. Other FCBs can be created by the JROC to oversee capability development and integration in the other functional areas.

Joint warfighting capability assessment teams (JWCAs) coordinate with and aid the sponsor to prevent needless overlapping of proposals across components and to ensure that joint capability gaps are properly addressed. They support the gatekeeper in determining the Joint Potential Designation and the lead and/or supporting JWCAs for each JCIDS document in the process. They also work with other JWCAs to make sure that analyses do not overlook any joint aspects.

== See also ==
- Analysis of Alternatives, JCIDS element
- Capability (systems engineering)
- DODAF DoD Architecture Framework
- Key Performance Parameters JCIDS element
- Military Acquisition
- Mission Need Statement JCIDS element
- Requirements Definition Package(s)-Supporting document to identify performance attributes of capability increments and reflects stakeholder negotiated detailed designs and interfaces.
