= JCA =

JCA may refer to:

== Computing ==
- Java Cryptography Architecture
- Java EE Connector Architecture, for connecting application servers and enterprise information systems (EIS)

== Military ==
- Joint capability areas, US Department of Defense listing of military capabilities
- Joint Cargo Aircraft, US Army and Air Force designation for the C-27 Spartan
- Joint Combat Aircraft, Royal Navy and RAF designation for the F-35 Joint Strike Fighter

== Organizations ==
- Camp JCA Shalom, a sleep-away camp in Malibu, California
- Jain Center of America, a Jain temple in New York, United States
- Japan Cricket Association, the governing body for cricket in Japan
- Japan Chess Association, the governing body for chess in Japan
- Japanese Cancer Association, a cancer research association in Japan
- Jewish Colonisation Association, founded 1891 to facilitate emigration of Jews
- Jewish Council of Australia, Australian advocacy organisation
- Joliet Catholic Academy, Illinois, US
- Josephite Community Aid, Australian charity founded in 1986

== Publications ==
- Journal of Computational Acoustics
- Journal of Contemporary Antisemitism

== Other uses ==
- Juvenile chronic arthritis
- Jean-Claude Ades, German electronic music producer
- Jackie Chan Adventures
