= Key Performance Parameters =

Key Performance Parameters (KPPs) specify what the critical performance goals are in a United States Department of Defense (DoD) acquisition under the JCIDS process.

The JCIDS intent for KPPs is to have a few measures stated where the acquisition product either meets the stated performance measure or else the program will be considered a failure per instructions CJCSI 3170.01H – Joint Capabilities Integration and Development System. The mandates require 3 to 8 KPPs be specified for a United States Department of Defense major acquisition, known as Acquisition Category 1 or ACAT-I.

The term is defined as "Performance attributes of a system considered critical to the development of an effective military capability. A KPP normally has a threshold representing the minimum acceptable value achievable at low-to-moderate risk, and an objective, representing the desired operational goal but at higher risk in cost, schedule, and performance. KPPs are contained in the Capability Development Document (CDD) and the Capability Production Document (CPD) and are included verbatim in the Acquisition Program Baseline (APB). KPPs are considered Measures of Performance (MOPs) by the operational test community."

Commentary notes that metrics must be chosen carefully, and that they are hard to define and apply throughout a projects life cycle. It is also desired that KPPs of a program avoid repetition, and to be something applicable among different programs such as fuel efficiency. Higher numbers of KPPs are associated to program and schedule instability.

== See also ==
- Analysis of Alternatives
- Requirement (example mention of Net-Ready KPP, a mandated KPP)
