= APB =

APB may refer to:

== Law enforcement and military ==
- All-points bulletin, a broadcast (about a wanted suspect or missing person) issued from one US law enforcement agency to another
- Acquisition Program Baseline, in the United States military

== Media ==
- "A.P.B.", a song on Womack & Womack's 1984 album Love Wars
- APB (band), a Scottish band
- Apoptygma Berzerk, a Norwegian electronic music group
- APB (1987 video game)
- APB: All Points Bulletin, a 2010 massively multiplayer online game for Microsoft Windows
- APB (TV series), an American television series that aired in 2017

== Organizations ==
- Abattoir Public de Bujumbura, a slaughterhouse in Bujumbura, Burundi
- Accounting Principles Board, the former authoritative body of the American Institute of Certified Public Accountants
- Alliance for Brazil
- Asia Pacific Breweries
- Atrocities Prevention Board, an interagency body in the U.S. government that evaluates long-term risks of genocide
- Auditing Practices Board, a committee of the Financial Reporting Council

== Science and technology ==
- 6-APB, a psychoactive compound similar in structure to MDA
- Advanced Peripheral Bus, a type of microcontroller bus
- Angrite parent body, the source of angrite meteorites
- Atrial premature beat, a cardiac dysrhythmia

== Other uses ==
- The Albany Pine Bush, an inland pine barrens
- Appley Bridge railway station's station code
- A version of the Stechkin automatic pistol with integrated silencer
- Aft pressure bulkhead, part of commercial airliners or other planes that have pressurized cabins
- A US Navy hull classification symbol: Self-propelled barracks ship (APB)
- Armor Piercing Bullets

== See also ==
- All Points Bulletin (disambiguation)
