= Capability management =

Capability management is a high-level management function, with particular application in the context of defense.

Capability management aims to balance economy in meeting current operational requirements, with the sustainable use of current capabilities, and the development of future capabilities, to meet the sometimes competing strategic and current operational objectives of an enterprise. Accordingly, effective capability management:

- Assists organizations to better understand, and effectively integrate the total enterprise ability or capacity to achieve strategic and current operational objectives; and
- Develops and provides solutions that focus on the management of the interlinking functions and activities in the enterprise's strategic and current operational contexts.

In military contexts, capabilities may also be analysed in terms of Force Structure and the Preparedness of elements or groupings within that Force Structure. Preparedness in turn may be analysed in terms of Readiness and Sustainability.

In both the military and commercial contexts, net-centric operations and related concepts are playing an increasingly important role in leading and driving business transformation, and contemporary capability management needs to have close regard of those factors. The level of interoperability, both technical and organisational/social, is a critical determinant of the net-centric capability that is able to be realised and employed.

== Capability management topics ==
=== Capability ===
Enterprises consist of a portfolio of capabilities that are used in various combinations to achieve outcomes. Within that portfolio, a capability will be transient unless managed and maintained over time. Therefore, a typical capability lifecycle spans needs, requirements, acquisition, in-service and obsolescence/disposal phases.

A developed management discipline within several national military organisations, the principles and practices of capability management are readily adaptable for application in the strategy and operations of many other enterprises.

=== Defining capabilities in the US military ===
The Joint Capabilities Integration and Development System Manual, CJCSM 3170.01, states that definitions of identified capabilities must satisfy two rules:

- Capability definitions must contain the required attributes with appropriate measures of effectiveness (e.g.: time, distance, effect [including scale] and obstacles to overcome).
- Capability definitions should be general and not influence a decision in favor of a particular means of implementation. The definition should be specific enough to evaluate alternative approaches to implement the capability.

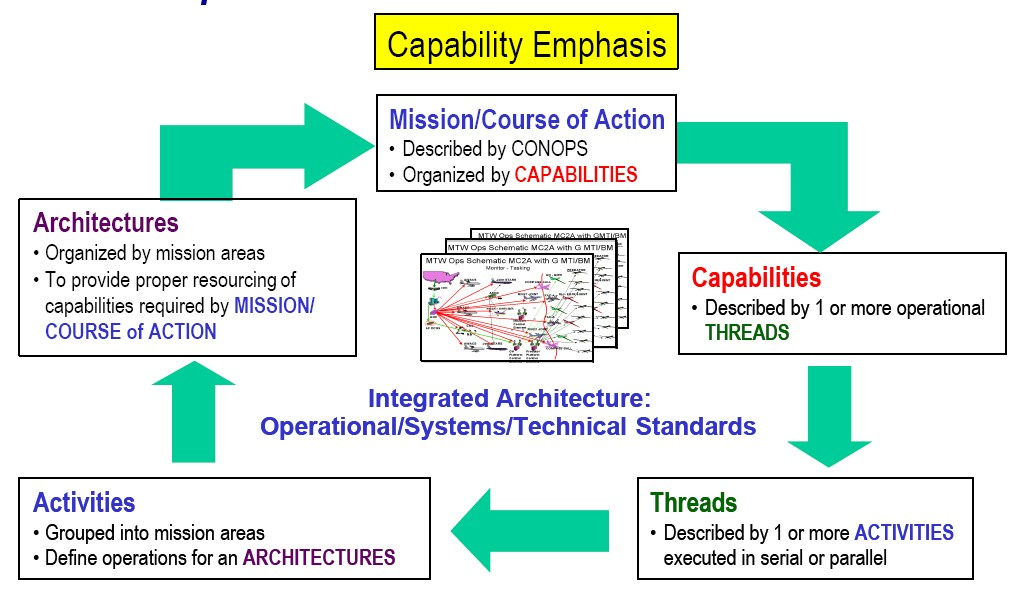
Capabilities described with architectures.

Capabilities are organized around concepts of operations (CONOPS), which describe how a specified course of action is to be executed. The ability to execute the specified course of action depends on many factors and the relationship between those factors. Capabilities can be described as one or more sequences of activities, referred to as operational threads. The threads are composed of a set of activities that can be grouped to form the basis for a mission area architecture. The architecture then provides the structure for defining and understanding the many factors that impact the capability. The figure illustrates this sequence of relationships.

The Navy has also endorsed using architectures to understand and analyze capabilities and their associated requirements. The Navy performs this architecture analysis based on the concept of Mission Capability Package (MCP). The intent is to consider all of the factors that contribute to the desired mission capability as an integrated system. An MCP is defined as "a task-oriented bundle of CONOPS, processes, and organization structures supported by networks, sensors, weapons, and systems, as well as personnel training and support services to sustain a core naval capability." The MCP and associated analysis then provide the basis for acquisition decisions.

=== Capability management considerations ===
Due to the complexities of system-of-systems integration, interoperability, and the dynamic nature of operations, capability management is greatly assisted by modelling and simulating realistic strategic scenarios and contexts, in order to inform business cases and decision-making. Through those considerations and practices, the enterprise and its performance can be continuously assessed and projected into the future.

Capability management clearly informs strategic and operational decisions and aids in the development of strategic and operational options, so they are readily available off-the-shelf, endowing agility to an enterprise, and providing enhanced "contingency capital" and risk mitigation.

Capability management therefore centers on:

- Strategic and operational appreciations and analyses
- Capability conceptualization, definition and development
- Operations research and analysis
- Context or scenario-based capability modelling and simulation
- Capability costing
- Capital project business cases and management
- Decision making and decision support
- Capability assurance and performance management

== Capability management frameworks ==
The interlinking functions and activities of the enterprise may be defined under several best-practice paradigms or frameworks, such as the Balanced Scorecard, or the US Department of Defense Architecture Framework, The Ministry of Defence Architecture Framework, The Open Group Architecture Framework and Zachman's Framework for Enterprise Architecture. In other words, capability is typically managed and assessed with regard to several dimensions or integrative elements.

=== DOTMLPF ===
The US military analyses its capabilities in the dimensions of "DOTMLPF", being:

- Doctrine
- Organizations
- Training
- Materiel
- Leader development
- Personnel
- Facilities

Interoperability concerns all capability dimensions, therefore NATO has extended the seven capability dimensions by the cross-cutting aspect of Interoperability and uses the acronym "DOTMLPF-I".

=== Defence Lines of Development ===
The UK Ministry of Defence uses a similar breakdown of Defence Lines of Development as follows:

- Training
- Equipment
- Personnel
- Information
- Concepts and Doctrine
- Organisation
- Infrastructure
- Logistics

The mnemonic "Tepid oil" is used to remember these. Though not a Defence Line of Development in itself, the unifying theme of 'interoperability' is considered to ensure a holistic approach to capability integration.

The UK Ministry of Defence cites Interoperability as an overarching theme that must be considered when any Defence Line of Development is being addressed.

=== Fundamental Inputs to Capability ===
The Australian Defence Organisation also analyses its capabilities in similar dimensions - the so-called Fundamental Inputs to Capability. These are:

- Command and Management
- Organisation
- Major Systems
- Personnel
- Supplies
- Support
- Facilities
- Collective Training
- Industry
- Data (new FIC Element as of 17 March 2025)
- Individual Training (new FIC Element as of 2026)

These Fundamental Inputs to Capability must be integrated and managed within a defined or constraining financial envelope in order to realise and sustain a capability: a deficiency in any one adversely impacts the whole.

== See also ==
- Capability approach
- Capability-based security
- Capability (systems engineering)
- Capability management in business
- Outline of management
