= Gap analysis =

Method to compare actual and desired performance

In management literature, gap analysis involves the comparison of actual performance with potential or desired performance. If an organization does not make the best use of current resources, or forgoes investment in productive physical capital or technology, it may produce or perform below an idealized potential. This concept is similar to an economy's production being below the production possibilities frontier.

Gap analysis identifies gaps between the optimized allocation and integration of the inputs (resources), and the current allocation-level. This reveals areas that can be improved. Gap analysis involves determining, documenting and improving the difference between business requirements and current capabilities. Gap analysis naturally flows from benchmarking and from other assessments. Once the general expectation of performance in an industry is understood, it is possible to compare that expectation with the company's current level of performance. This comparison becomes the gap analysis. Such analysis can be performed at the strategic or at the operational level of an organization.

Gap analysis is a formal study of what a business is doing currently and where it wants to go in the future. It can be conducted, in different perspectives, as follows:

1. Organization (e.g., Human Resources)
2. Business direction
3. Business processes
4. Information technology

Gap analysis provides a foundation for measuring investment of time, money and human resources required to achieve a particular outcome (e.g. to turn the salary payment process from paper-based to paperless with the use of a system). Note that "GAP analysis" has also been used as a means of classifying how well a product or solution meets a targeted need or set of requirements. In this case, "GAP" can be used as a ranking of "Good", "Average" or "Poor". (This terminology appears in the PRINCE2 project management publication.)

== Gap analysis and new products ==
The need for new products or additions to existing lines may emerge from portfolio analysis, in particular from the use of the Boston Consulting Group Growth-share matrix—or the need may emerge from the regular process of following trends in the requirements of consumers. At some point, a gap emerges between what existing products offer and what the consumer demands. The organization must fill that gap to survive and grow.

Gap analysis can identify gaps in the market. Thus, comparing forecast profits with desired profits reveals the planning gap. This represents a goal for new activities in general, and for new products in particular. The planning gap can be divided into three main elements: the usage gap, the existing gap, and the product gap.

=== Usage gap ===
The usage gap is the gap between the total potential of the market and the actual current usage by all consumers in the market. The data required for this calculation include:

- Market usage
- Existing usage

=== Existing usage ===
Existing consumer usage makes up the total current market, from which market shares, for example, are calculated. It usually derives from marketing research, most accurately from panel research, but also from adhoc work. Sometimes it may be available from figures that governments or industries have collected. However, these are often based on categories that make bureaucratic sense but are less helpful in marketing terms. The 'usage gap' is thus:

usage gap = market potential – existing usage

This is an important calculation. Many, if not most, marketers accept existing market size—suitably projected their forecast timescales—as the boundary for expansion plans. Though this is often the most realistic assumption, it may impose an unnecessary limit on horizons. For example: the original market for video-recorders was limited to professional users who could afford high prices. Only after some time did the technology extend to the mass market.

In the public sector, where service providers usually enjoy a monopoly, the usage gap is probably the most important factor in activity development. However, persuading more consumers to take up family benefits, for example, is probably more important to the relevant government department than opening more local offices.

The usage gap is most important for market leaders. If a company has a significant share of the whole market, it may find it worthwhile to invest in making the market bigger. This option is not generally available to smaller players, though they may still profit by targeting specific offerings as market extensions.

All other gaps relate to the difference between existing sales (market share) and the total sales of the market as a whole. This difference is the competitors' share. These gaps, therefore, relate to competitive activity.

=== Product gap ===
The product gap—also called the segment or positioning gap—is that part of the market a particular organization is excluded from because of product or service characteristics. This may be because the market is segmented and the organization does not have offerings in some segments, or because the organization positions its offerings in a way that effectively excludes certain potential consumers—because competitive offerings are much better placed for these consumers.

This segmentation may result from deliberate policy. Segmentation and positioning are powerful marketing techniques, but the trade-off—against better focus—is that market segments may effectively be put beyond reach. On the other hand, product gap can occur by default; the organization has thought out its positioning, its offerings drifted to a particular market segment.

The product gap may be the main element of the planning gap where an organization can have productive input; hence the emphasis on the importance of correct positioning.

== Used to develop a better process ==
A gap analysis can also be used to analyze gaps in processes and the gulf between the existing outcome and the desired outcome. This step process can be illustrated by the example below:

- Identify the existing process: fishing by using fishing rods
- Identify the existing outcome: we can manage to catch 20 fish per day
- Identify the desired outcome: we want to catch 100 fish per day
- Identify and document the gap: it is a difference of 80 fish
- Identify the process to achieve the desired outcome: we can use an alternative method such as using a fishing net
- Develop the means to fill the gap: acquire and use a fishing net
- Develop and prioritize Requirements to bridge the gap

A gap analysis can also be used to compare one process to others performed elsewhere, which are often identified through benchmarking. In this usage, one compares each process side-by-side and step-by-step and then notes the differences. One then analyzes each deviation to determine if there is any benefit to changing to the alternate process. The results of this analysis (in the context of the benefits and detriments of changing processes) may support the maintenance of the current process, the wholesale adoption of an alternate process, or a fusion of different aspects of each process.

== See also ==
- Capability (systems engineering)
