= Adaptive Vehicle Make =

Adaptive Vehicle Make was a portfolio of programs overseen by DARPA, of the United States Department of Defense. AVM attempted to address revolutionary approaches to the design, verification, and manufacturing of complex defense systems and vehicles. The three primary programs were META, Instant Foundry Adaptive through Bits (iFAB), and Fast Adaptable Next-Generation Ground Vehicle (FANG GV) programs. Many components of the program leveraged crowdsourcing and were open source and the ultimate intent was to crowdsource a next generation combat vehicle. The program was managed by Nathan Wiedenman under DARPA's Tactical Technology Office. A Proposer's Day was held and several Broad Agency Announcements released on 7 October 2010. The AVM program was ended in February 2014 without building and testing a complete vehicle.

== Background ==
A frequently cited criticism of the DoD is the expensive and often inefficient way that it buys and builds new things. The scope of this process can be seen in the Integrated Defense Acquisition, Technology, & Logistics Life Cycle Management Framework. One of the big challenges associated with these processes is the craftsmen-like nature of building these complex cyber-mechanical systems. A typical approach is to break the system into subsystems and have separate teams embark on building the individual subsystems and optimize them for Size, Weight, and Power. Once the subsystems reach a reasonable level of development, an integration effort takes place to tie the subsystems together. The system is then tested against requirements which are almost never met on the first integration-testing cycle. The steps will then be iterated until the system meets its requirements.

This is a costly approach, especially compared with something like chip production. Intel, for instance, has an excellent track record in getting systems right in the design phase so that extensive testing and integration are not needed. This "correct-by-construction" methodology is powerful and would not be possible without high-level design languages to support validation and verification. The goal of the AVM program was to move to this model for building large, complex, heterogeneous cyber-mechanical systems for increased cost and schedule efficiencies.

== META ==
The goal of META was to analyse interactions between components and provide verification and validation (V&V) of designs without prototyping in order to shorten development time. META was to develop new languages or language extensions (Generic Modeling Environment and CyPhyML) that encapsulated sufficient complexity to compile a component library, context library, and manufacturing library for this type of analysis and certification. META I began in mid-2010 and was scheduled to last 15 months. META II was to begin in late 2010 and last 12 months. An infantry fighting vehicle library was to be compiled in late 2011 and continue for 1.5 years.

== Instant Foundry Adaptive through Bits ==
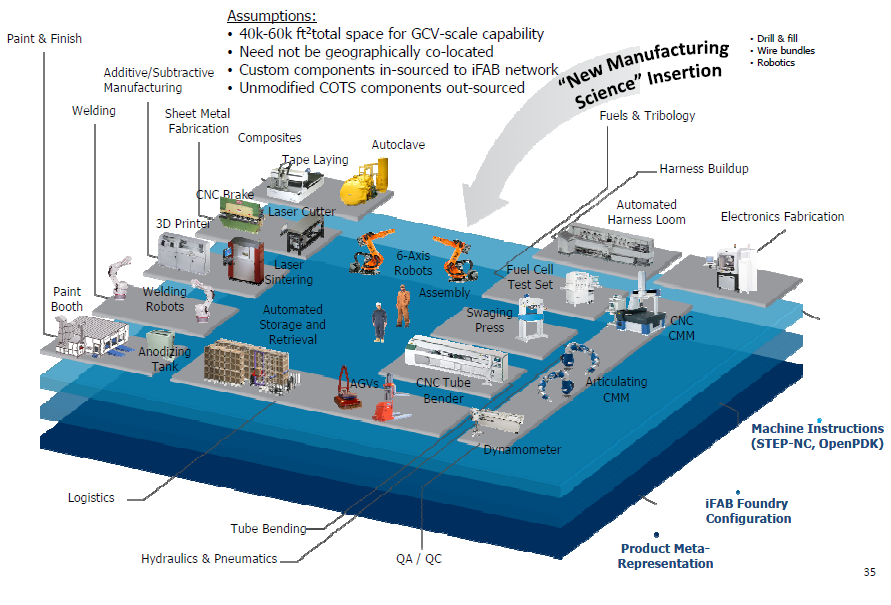
DARPA concept image

Instant Foundry Adaptive through Bits (iFAB) attempted to design a manufacturing facility that could fabricate vehicles and could be reconfigured to manufacture other systems. The facility would be capable of manufacturing the FANG vehicle. iFAB looked to lay the groundwork for development of a foundry-style manufacturing capability – taking as input a verified system design specified in an appropriate metalanguage – capable of rapid reconfiguration to accommodate a wide range of design variability and specifically targeted at the fabrication of military ground vehicles.

== Fast Adaptable Next-Generation Ground Vehicle ==
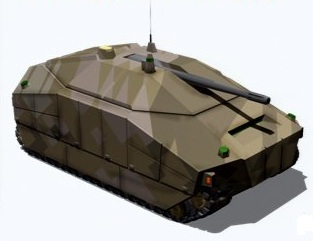
DARPA concept image

Fast Adaptable Next-Generation Ground Vehicle (FANG GCV) was a portfolio of three loosely related projects. The FANG GCV attempted to crowdsource the design of an infantry fighting vehicle culminating in prototypes. Participants were to use the META metalanguage with the option to use Vehicleforge.

The program was to occur in three phases. The Mobility/Drivetrain Challenge lasted three months and began in 2013. A prize of $0.5–1 million was awarded for the winning design. The Chassis/Integrated Survivability Challenge was to last three months and begin in the middle of 2013 subsequent to the Mobility/Drivetrain Challenge. A prize of $.5–1 million for the winning design(s) was to be awarded. The third challenge, the Total Platform Challenge was to last six months and begin in early 2014. A prototype would be completed that would be eligible for consideration for the Amphibious Combat Vehicle program.

The vehicle was to be capable of amphibious transport and have requirements similar to the U.S. Marine Corps Amphibious Combat Vehicle program. The vehicle design would be open source.

In April 2013, DARPA awarded US$1 million to a three-man team of designers for its drivetrain for the Marine ACV. The team, Team Ground Systems, used the online design tools and open-source code provided by DARPA to put together a proposal that won for system performance and manufacturability. 1,000 other competitors ultimately participated in the contest. The design then had to be validated for manufacturability feedback, foundry configuration, and instruction-generation tools, then tested and evaluated. DARPA was to award a $1 million prize for a hull design and $2 million in 2014 for the complete vehicle design.

DARPA decided not to proceed with FANG 2 or 3 Challenges as originally planned. Open source challenges had received huge enthusiasm from the public, but military designs require specific engineering qualifications and the use of sensitive materials that must be kept out of the public domain. In February 2014, DARPA began transitioning AVM into the defense and commercial industry through the Digital Manufacturing and Design Innovation Institute (DMDII) effort, which is to be a national resource to accelerate innovation in digital manufacturing. The drivetrain and power pack developed under the FANG challenge was built and tested successfully, and the meta design tools were transitioned to industry years earlier than planned.

=== Vehicleforge.mil ===
The vehicleforge.mil program attempted to provide the necessary infrastructure for sharing design files among distributed design teams. Similar approaches in software had proven very successful for collaboration and innovation, such as the "clone-and-own" paradigm commonly used on sites like github.com and sourceforge.net. Vehicleforge.mil was to be built on a 12-month contract cycle starting in mid-2011 and have a minimum additional three years of support. All resultant infrastructure components were to be released under an open source license.

=== Manufacturing Experimentation and Outreach (MENTOR) ===
Manufacturing Experimentation and Outreach (MENTOR) facilitates collaboration among high school-aged students. MENTOR was to provide materials for high school-aged students to utilize. Up to 1,000 3D printers were to be distributed. Schools would compete in prize challenges for design of moderately complex systems. The effort was to begin in 2011 and attempt to reach 10 schools in its second year, 100 schools in its third, and 1,000 schools in its fourth.
