= Executable architecture =

An Executable Architecture (EA), in general, is the description of a system architecture (including software and/or otherwise) in a formal notation together with the tools (e.g. compilers/translators) that allow the automatic or semi-automatic generation of artifacts (e.g. capability gap analysis (CGA), models, software stubs, Military Scenario Definition Language (MSDL)) from that notation and which are used in the analysis, refinement, and/or the implementation of the architecture described.

== Closely related subjects ==
Subjects closely related to EA include:

- Object Management Group's Model-driven architecture
- Object Management Group's Business Process Management Initiative
- Vanderbilt University's Model Integrated Computing (MIC)

== Implementations ==
Implementations of EA include:

- Rational Rose
- Generic Modeling Environment (GME)
- Open-Source eGov Reference Architecture (OSERA)

== See also ==
- Business Process Execution Language (BPEL)
- Business Process Management Initiative (BPMI)
- Business Process Modeling Language (BPML)
- Executable Operational Architecture
- Model-driven architecture (MDA)
- Model-driven engineering (MDE)
- Object Management Group (OMG)
- Semantic Web
- Unified Process
- Unified Modeling Language (UML)
- Vanderbilt University
