= Target operating model =

Desired state of a business operating model

Target operating model is a description of the desired state of the operating model of an organization. When working on the operating model, it is normal to define the "as is" model and the "to be" model. The target operating model is the "to be" model. It is possible to produce a target operating model for a business or a function within a business or a government department or a charity.

There are many different frameworks identifying the components of a target operating model. Hence each project to define a target operating model will focus on slightly different aspects depending on the challenge facing the organisation. Some target operating models are created to help with the link between information technology and strategy, others to help with the link between organisation design and strategy, and so on. A target operating model converts strategy ideas into operational plans.

One framework described in the operating model definition comes from Ashridge Executive Education – POLISM. This stands for

- P – processes and capabilities;
- O – the organization, i.e. the people that are needed to run the processes or deliver the capabilities, and the organisation structure, accountabilities, incentives and culture that will support and nurture these people;
- L – the locations, buildings, infrastructure and other assets and resources needed inside the organisation to support the processes and capabilities;
- I – the information systems and other cross-organisation or cross-location links needed to support the processes and capabilities, especially the software applications that are needed to process the information;
- S – the suppliers and business partners needed outside the organisation to support the processes and capabilities and the types of agreements between this organisation and these partners.
- M – the management systems and processes for developing strategy, planning, setting targets, managing performance and continuous improvement.

A simpler framework is used in the literature on Enterprise Architecture. Strategy is converted into capabilities, using a capability map, and each capability is described in terms of "people", process and technology.

A target operating model can be a one-page document – the operating model Canvas is an example. It can also be 10 pages or 100 pages. If the document is more than 100 pages it becomes a manual rather than a model.

Target operating models provide the vision for organisations undergoing change. The reason for any new model is likely to be a new strategy or new business model or a significant failure in the performance of the existing operations for one or more stakeholders. Hence work on target operating models should be closely linked to strategy work. Form follows function; in other words target operating models follow strategy. A target operating model project typically also includes the roadmap over time that specifies what the company needs to do to move from the "as is" to the "to be".

A good place to start is with a value-chain map. First identify the value propositions (the products and services) that the organization is offering. Then define, for each value proposition, the value chain of activities that is needed to deliver the proposition. Different value chains can then be present above or underneath each other in a "map", in order to identify steps that can be "aggregated" across chains to gain economies of scale or "standardised" to gain consistency or "kept separate" to gain local adaptation. These choices then lead directly to organisational implications.

Target operating model OM work can be done at different levels of detail. At the highest level is the strategy or the design principles. Then comes a rough sketch, probably in the form of a value chain map or organisational model. Then comes more and more layers of detail arriving finally at job descriptions for every job, floor layouts for offices or factories, Key Performance Indicators for every department, draft contracts for every supplier, data input and output specifications for every software application, etc.

== Regional target operating model ==
A regional target operating model is a transformational project with solution covering across regions. It forms regional standards for implementation across regions. This type of model should capture the as-is of the organization design, business capabilities, business processes and supporting technology components. It will define the to-be organization design, business capabilities, business processes and required supporting technology capabilities. The high level business benefits of this model should also be articulated. For identified gaps in the technology capabilities, the business requirements should be captured to facilitate the next phase of work – solution evaluation.

== See also ==
- Business model
- Operating model
- Business plan
- Business process modeling
- Business reference model
- Strategic management
- Strategic planning
- Strategy dynamics
- The Design of Business
- Enterprise architecture
