= Concept of operations =

Proposal of system capabilities, operations and requirements

A concept of operations (abbreviated CONOPS, CONOPs, or ConOps) is a document describing the characteristics of a proposed system from the viewpoint of an individual who will use that system. Examples include business requirements specification or stakeholder requirements specification (StRS). CONOPS is used to communicate the quantitative and qualitative system characteristics to all stakeholders. CONOPS are widely used in the military, governmental services and other fields.

A CONOPS generally evolves from a concept and is a description of how a set of capabilities may be employed to achieve desired objectives or end state.

== Properties ==
Concept of Operations documents can be developed in many different ways but usually share the same properties. In general, a CONOPS will include the following:

- Statement of the goals and objectives of the system
- Strategies, tactics, policies, and constraints affecting the system
- Organizations, activities, and interactions among participants and stakeholders
- Clear statement of responsibilities and authorities delegated
- Specific operational processes for fielding the system
- Processes for initiating, developing, maintaining, and retiring the system

A CONOPS should relate a narrative of the process to be followed in implementing a system. It should define the roles of the stakeholders involved throughout the process. Ideally it offers clear methodology to realize the goals and objectives for the system, while not intending to be an implementation or transition plan itself.

=== Standardization ===
CONOPS standards are available to guide the development of a CONOPS document. The Institute of Electrical and Electronics Engineers (IEEE) Standard is structured around information systems, but the standard may be applied to other complex systems as well.

The first standard was 1362-1998 - IEEE Guide for Information Technology - System Definition - Concept of Operations (ConOps) Document that was superseded by the document 29148-2011 - ISO/IEC/IEEE International Standard - Systems and software engineering -- Life cycle processes --Requirements engineering.

Then came the 2012 AIAA revision proposal Guide: Guide to the Preparation of Operational Concept Documents (ANSI/AIAA G-043A-2012) (Revision of G-043-1992), and today we have ISO/IEC/IEEE 15288:2015 Systems and software engineering -- System life cycle processes.

== Military use ==
In the field of joint military operations, a CONOPS in DoD terminology is a verbal or graphic statement that clearly and concisely expresses what the joint force commander intends to accomplish and how it will be done using available resources. CONOPS may also be used or summarized in system acquisition DODAF descriptions such as the OV-1 High Level Operational Concept Graphic.

== See also ==
- Software requirements specification
- Requirements engineering
- Theory of operation
- ISO/IEC 15288
- Business process management
- High-Level Operational Concept Graphic
