= Generic Modeling Environment =

The Generic Modeling Environment (GME) is a domain-specific, model-integrated program synthesis tool for creating domain-specific models of large-scale systems. GME development started in 2000 at Vanderbilt University, US and continues well into 2022. Initially it only supported MS Windows OS, but later evolved into WebGME, a web- and Node.js- based software. Its primary purpose is model-building.

== Overview ==
GME allows users to define new modeling languages using UML-based metamodels. GME was developed in 2000 by the Institute for Software Integrated Systems at Vanderbilt University. GME is a part of the META Tool Suite and the Adaptive Vehicle Make program. The main language it uses is CyPhyML.

hierarchy, multiple aspects, sets, references, and explicit constraints

=== WebGME ===
The new version of GME, called WebGME, is entirely web-browser based. It supports simultaneous distributed collaborative editing of models and has a version controlled database backend in the cloud. The native file format is .webgmexm.

== See also ==
- Adaptive Vehicle Make (AVM)
- Domain-specific modelling (DSM)
- Executable Architecture (EA)
- MetaCASE tool
- Ptolemy Project
