= Value proposition =

Promise of value to be delivered, communicated, and acknowledged

In marketing, a value proposition is the economic value that a company or product delivers to its market segment of customers. The phrase was coined by McKinsey consultants Michael Lanning and Edward Michaels in 1988.

Value propositions facilitate product differentiation and market positioning and form part of a company's overall marketing strategy. A customer's value proposition is the perceived subjective value of a product or service, and it may differ from the value proposition that a company has constructed as part of its marketing strategy.

The creation of a value proposition can be based on various analytical tools, including the marketing mix, balanced scorecard, and cost-benefit analysis. A value proposition statement usually contains references to which sector the company is operating in, what products or services they are selling, who are its target clients, and which points differentiate it from other brands and make its product or service a superior choice for those clients.

== Definition ==
The phrase "value proposition" is credited to Michael Lanning and Edward Michaels, who first used the term in a 1988 staff paper for the consulting firm McKinsey and Co. In the paper, titled "A business is a value delivery system", the authors write: "A business unit promises customers some value, a combination of benefit and price. It thus offers a value proposition.".

Labeaux defines a value proposition as a statement that clearly identifies what benefits a customer will receive by purchasing a particular product or service from a vendor. According to Hassan, however, there is no specific definition for value proposition. Practically, a value proposition can be thought of as a market positioning statement which summarizes why a consumer should buy a product or use a service, or the economic value that a company or product delivers to its market segment of customers.

Value propositions form part of the overall business strategy of a company. Kaplan and Norton argue that "strategy is based on a differentiated customer value proposition." Capon and Hulbert link the success of firms in the marketplace to the value provided to customers.

Tjan includes provision of necessities as a further type of value proposition as opposed to mere wants. Value propositions can also be categorised by product quality and price:

Value propositions relative to competitors
	Lower quality	Same quality	Higher quality
Lower price	Less for much less	Same for less	More for less
Same price	Negative value proposition	No value proposition	More for the same
Higher price	Negative value proposition	Negative value proposition	More for more

A customer's value proposition is the perceived subjective value of a product or service, and it may differ from the value proposition that a company has constructed as part of its marketing strategy.

== Strategy and planning ==
The creation of a value proposition can be based on various analytical tools, including the marketing mix, balanced scorecard, and cost-benefit analysis.

A value proposition statement usually contains references to which sector the company is operating in, what products or services they are selling, who are its target clients, and which points differentiate it from other brands and make its product or service a superior choice for those clients.

=== Value proposition canvas ===
A value proposition can be built upon a variation of the business model canvas known as the value proposition canvas. The Business Model Canvas gives the big picture of how a business works. The Value Proposition Canvas zooms in on one part of it: the fit between a specific customer segment and what you offer, by mapping customer needs and the response you build for them.

The Value Proposition Canvas is a structured way to align an offering (own assets) with what customers are trying to do. Its planning starts on the customer (right-hand) side by defining Customer Jobs and the outcomes that matter, then clarifies Gains (improvements the customer would like to have) and Pains (frictions, risks or inefficiencies that need to be tackled). These often translate into business results such as higher revenue, lower cost, or improved quality and reliability, depending on the customer context. The organisation's (left-hand) side then specifies the response: Assets (Products and Services) to offer, plus Gain Creators and Pain Relievers that address the prioritised gains and pains on the customer side of the canvas. This exposes gaps by testing if current assets are sufficient or need development. In practice, teams typically plan from customer reality to organisational response, then deliver by building and tailoring internal capabilities to realise the intended customer outcomes.

=== Value-focused enterprise model ===
The value-focused enterprise model outlines four steps pertaining to the development of a value proposition:

1. Value-centered strategic intent
2. Value proposition
3. Value-focused operating model
4. Value-creation-based management and execution

=== Value cycle ===
Osterwalder and Pigneur state that the value proposition must be studied through its entire value life cycle, which comprises five stages:

1. Value creation
2. Value appropriation
3. Value consumption
4. Value renewal
5. Value transfer

=== Value status ===
Capon & Hulbert introduced some factors that a firm must consider before making pricing decisions, which include:

1. Perceived substitutes: differentiation on offers and prices compared to competitors.
2. Unique value: customers weigh the benefits and features of the product and perceive these benefits as a unique value provided solely by the organization.
3. Price and quality: firms should consider that customers will seek to have a positive price/quality relationship for a product to make a purchase decision.

Zeithaml studied three consumer defined values: low price, quality and value for money, and features. The study concluded that perceived value is the customer's overall assessment of the utility of a product based on perceptions of what is received and what is given.

== Significance ==
Lindic and Marques argue that value propositions are a significant catalyst for customer focused innovation. For example, in the case of Amazon, innovation resulting from value proposition led to the company's diversification and transformation from an online bookstore to an online shopping service. At the same time, Kambil argues that the value proposition concept is too vague to be useful for innovation, and that innovation is a phenomenon that requires a multidisciplinary approach for analysis due to its sheer complexity.

== See also ==
- Employee value proposition
- Value added
