= Operating model =

Abstract model of organizational processes

An operating model is both an abstract and visual representation (model) of how an organization delivers value to its customers or beneficiaries as well as how an organization actually runs itself.

== Definition ==
There are different ways of defining the elements that make up an operating model.

People, process and technology is one commonly used definition, process, organization and technology is another.

An organization is a complex system for delivering value. An operating model breaks this system into components, showing how it works. It can help different participants understand the whole. It can help leaders identify problems that are causing under performance. It can help those making changes check that they have thought through all elements and that the whole will still work. It can help those transforming an operation coordinate all the different changes that need to happen.

An operating model is like the blueprint for a building. It is more dynamic than a building blueprint, with changes occurring regularly. Also, an operating model is not usually just one blueprint. There are likely to be blueprints for each element: processes, organization, decision making, software applications, locations and so on.

An operating model can describe the way an organization does business today – the as is. It can also communicate the vision of how an operation will work in the future – the to be. In this context it is often referred to as the target operating model, which is a view of the operating at a future point in time. Most typically, an operating model is a living set of documents that are continually changing, like an organization chart.

An operating model describes how an organization delivers value, as such it is a subset of the larger concept 'business model'. A business model describes how an organization creates, delivers and captures value and sustains itself in the process. An operating model focuses on the delivery element of the business model. There are plenty of disagreements about the use of the words business model and operating model.

The term operating model may have been first used in corporate-level strategy (see History below) to describe the way in which an organization is structured into business divisions, what activities are centralized or decentralized and how much integration is required across business divisions. The term is most commonly used today when referring to the way a single business division or single function operates, as in 'the operating model of the exploration division' or 'the operating model of the HR function'. It can also be used at a much more micro level to describe how a department within a function works or how a factory is laid out. The section below titled Business/IT dialogue, explores one framework for thinking about the IT implications of different corporate strategies.

An operating model is one of the tools that leaders can use to help them formulate and execute strategy. Typically work on an operating model starts after some strategic plan has been proposed. It translates that plan into operating requirements and decisions and often also contributes to the plan by showing areas where the plan will be hard to implement.

An operating model can also be used as a tool when an organization is facing performance challenges. The model can help with the diagnosis (what is causing the performance problems) and with the solution (what needs to change to correct the problems).

However, probably the most common use of the operating model tool is to get alignment between managers in different functions or divisions about how they are going to work together for the benefit of the whole.

Additional maps and charts are often needed. For example, an operating model will typically include an IT blueprint, locations maps, a supplier matrix, people models, decision grids and other elements such as a scorecard for assessing performance. The particular set of documents created will depend on what the operating model is being used for. There is no generally accepted set of charts or at least there is no agreement yet about what charts make up an operating model.

== History ==
=== Origins in corporate strategy ===
The term operating model has been used in corporate strategy to mean what Lynch, et al., of corporate strategy describe as: "the relationships among the businesses in the corporation's portfolio and the process by which investments will be determined among them."

Corporate strategy grew out of the research of Harvard Business School professor Bruce R. Scott who developed a model of the stages of corporate development. He traced the evolution of a firm from "Stage I" with a single product (or line of products) to "Stage 3" with multiple lines of business, markets and channels. Following this work, Leonard Wrigley and Richard Rumelt developed ways of classifying company structures and comparing their strategies. They identified four different operating models:

1. Single line of business firms, where most revenue comes from a single activity;
2. Related businesses where diversification is achieved by adding businesses that complement the original activity;
3. Diversified firms that combines unrelated businesses, such as an oil company and a fertilizer business;
4. Conglomerates – diversification is achieved without regard to complementary or synergistic effects.

The nomenclature evolved, but the categories survive:

- Integrated: single business, requiring a single strategy for competitive advantage. Issues are formulated centrally and tailored for local needs to optimize the business. Success is measured by adding up the global numbers. Examples include McDonald's or Harley Davidson.
- Allied-related: each business contains the ability to create advantage autonomously. Common interests are worked across businesses. Some support work may be shared across businesses. Examples include Canon and Procter & Gamble.
- Allied-unrelated: each business contains the core work required to create advantage autonomously. Customers may be shared. Common interest are worked across businesses. Capabilities that portable to other businesses are shared for leverage. Examples include Avery Dennison's pressure-sensitive technology and self-adhesive base technologies that are used in Roll Materials medical group for single-use medical products.
- Holding company: includes unrelated businesses, with multiple strategies, related or not. Each business has self-contained brands/businesses with independent functional groups. The units are tied together only by ownership. Examples include Tyco International.

Some implications of the choice:

| Component | Integrated | Allied-related | Allied-unrelated | Holding |
|---|---|---|---|---|
| Business strategy | One | Many | Many | Many |
| Customers | Same | Shared | Some shared | Many |
| Corporate role | Resource allocations | Define protocols | Define protocols | Financial roll-ups and analysis |
| Human capital | Common | Some shared | Some shared | Independent |
| IT systems | Common | Common | Few, interconnected | Different |
| Enabling processes | Centralized | Centralized | Some centralized | Decentralized |

=== Service Orientation Operating Models ===
Operating models have become popular with service organisations, looking to improve processes to deliver greater value to customers and/or beneficiaries. One such operating model is the Service Operating Model Skills (SOMS) framework.

SOMS is an operating model focused on the service sector. SOMS stipulates the expertise needed for people creating and working with operating models. The framework consists of seven elements:

1. The customer experience
2. Performance management and improvement
3. Demand and capacity management
4. People capability
5. Process context
6. Delivery – process design
7. Strategy, governance, and leadership

SOMS was created by the Centre for Service Management in the School of Business and Economics at Loughborough University in response to requests from trainers and instructors in the service sector; and is based on academic research from the Centre for Service Management.

== Business/IT dialogue ==
The MIT Center for Information Systems Research (CISR), a research group at the MIT Sloan School of Management, suggests that an operating model is useful to guide IT investment decisions. IT investment must support the operating model.

Ross, Weill and Robertson found that an organization with an operating model reported 31% higher operational efficiency, 33% higher customer satisfaction, and a 34% advantage in new product development. In the book Enterprise Architecture as Strategy, they outline four operating models:

Process standardization and integration
| | Process standardization | |
| Process integration | Low | High |
|---|---|---|
| High | Coordination | Unification |
| Low | Diversification | Replication |

- Coordination – low process standardization but high process integration (compare with allied strategy, where subsidiaries provide varied products to the same customers)
- Unification – both high standardization and integration (compare with integrated strategy)
- Diversification – businesses requiring low standardization and low integration (compare with holding company strategy)
- Replication – high standardization but low integration (compare with franchisees or replicated facilities of an integrated strategy)

Operating models inform the appropriate level of business process integration and standardization to deliver the organizations promises to stakeholders.

The operating model informs IT leaders about how various technical and business components should be designed and implemented to enable the chosen operating model:

Technical/operational model grid
| Component | Coordination | Unification | Diversification | Replication |
|---|---|---|---|---|
| Customer data | Yes | Yes | | |
| Product data | Yes | Yes | | |
| Shared services | Yes | Yes | Yes | Yes |
| Infrastructure technology | Yes | Yes | Yes | |
| Portal technology | Yes | | | |
| Middleware technology | Yes | | | |
| Operational processes | | Yes | | Yes |
| Decision making processes | | Yes | | |
| Application systems | | Yes | | |
| Systems component technology | | | | Yes |

Coordination and unification models benefit more from consolidated views of customer and data across the enterprise than do diversification and replication models.

== Industry standard operating models ==
- Business Process Framework (eTOM)
- IAA (Insurance Application Architecture)
- BIAN (Banking Industry Architecture Network e.V. (BIAN))
- IFW (Information Framework)
- ITIL
- COBIT (Control Objectives for Information and Related Technology)

== See also ==
- Business architecture
- Business model
- Capability management in business
- Enterprise architecture
- Risk and compliance
- Shared services
- Target operating model
