= Operational View =

Component of Department of Defense Architecture Framework

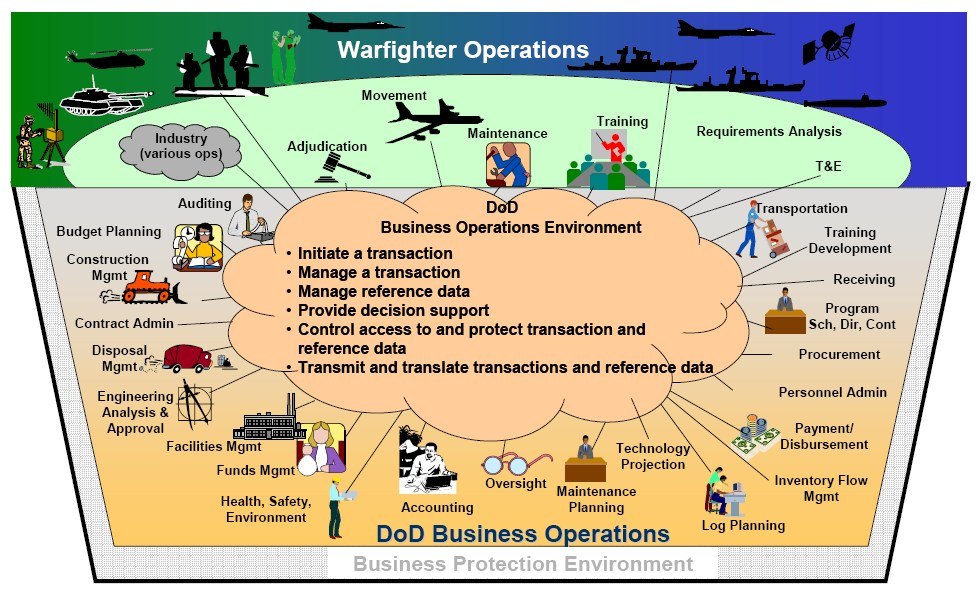
Example of an "Operational View" (OV) on the DoD Electronic Commerce Concept of Operations.

Operational View (OV) is one of the basic views defined in the enterprise architecture (EA) of the Department of Defense Architecture Framework V1.5 (DoDAF) and is related with concept of operations. Under DODAF 2, which became operational in 2009, the collections of views are now termed 'viewpoints' and no longer views.

Other enterprise architecture frameworks may or do have operational views. For example, the MODAF has an Operational Viewpoint and the NATO Architecture Framework has an Operational View (collection of subviews). This article will further explain the construction of the Operational View of the DoDAF V1.5.

== Overview ==
The "Operational View" (OV) in the DoDAF Enterprise architecture framework (version 1/1.5) ('Operational Viewpoint' in DODAF 2) describes the tasks and activities, operational elements, and information exchanges required to conduct operations. A pure Operational View is material independent. However, operations and their relationships may be influenced by new technologies such as collaboration technology, where process improvements are in practice before policy can reflect the new procedures.

The operational viewpoint provides a means to describe what is needed in a solution-free or implementation-free way. There may be some cases, however, in which it is necessary to document the way processes are performed given the restrictions of current systems, in order to examine ways in which new systems could facilitate streamlining the processes. In such cases, an Operational View may have material constraints and requirements that must be addressed. For this reason, it may be necessary to include some high-level Systems View (SV) architecture data as overlays or augmenting information onto the Operational View products.

== Operational View topics ==
=== DoDAF ===
The Department of Defense Architecture Framework (DoDAF) defines a standard way to organize a systems architecture into complementary and consistent views. It is especially suited to large systems with complex integration and interoperability challenges, and is apparently unique in its use of "operational views" detailing the external customer's operating domain in which the developing system will operate.

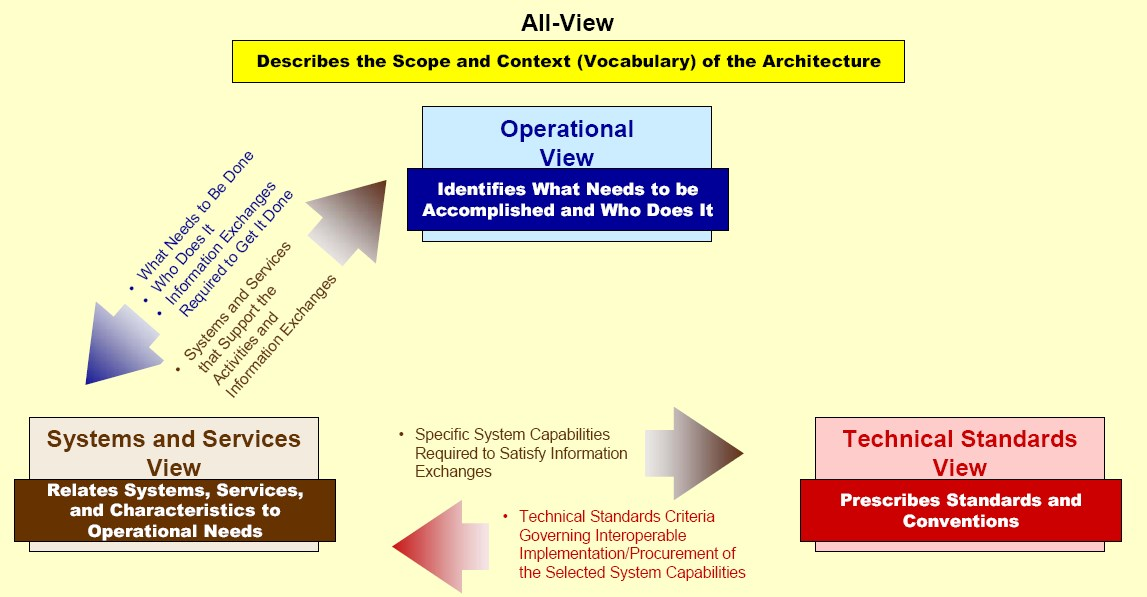
DoDAF view model shows the linkages among views.

The DoDAF defines a set of products that act as mechanisms for visualizing, understanding, and assimilating the broad scope and complexities of an architecture description through graphic, tabular, or textual means. These products are organized under four views:

- Overarching All View (AV),
- Operational View (OV),
- Systems View (SV), and the
- Technical Standards View (TV).

Each view depicts certain perspectives of an architecture as described below. Only a subset of the full DoDAF viewset is usually created for each system development. The figure represents the information that links the operational view, systems and services view, and technical standards view. The three views and their interrelationships driven – by common architecture data elements – provide the basis for deriving measures such as interoperability or performance, and for measuring the impact of the values of these metrics on operational mission and task effectiveness.

=== OV products ===
The Department of Defense Architecture Framework (DoDAF) has defined a series of seven different types of Operational View products. There are seven OV products described in this section:

- High-Level Operational Concept Graphic (OV-1)
- Operational Node Connectivity (Resource Flow) Description (OV-2)
- Operational Information Exchange (Resource Flow) Matrix (OV-3)
- Organizational Relationships Chart (OV-4)
- Operational Activity Model (OV-5)
- Operational Rules Model, State Transition Description, and Event-Trace Description (OV-6a, 6b, and 6c)
- Logical Data Model (OV-7)

==== High-Level Operational Concept Graphic ====
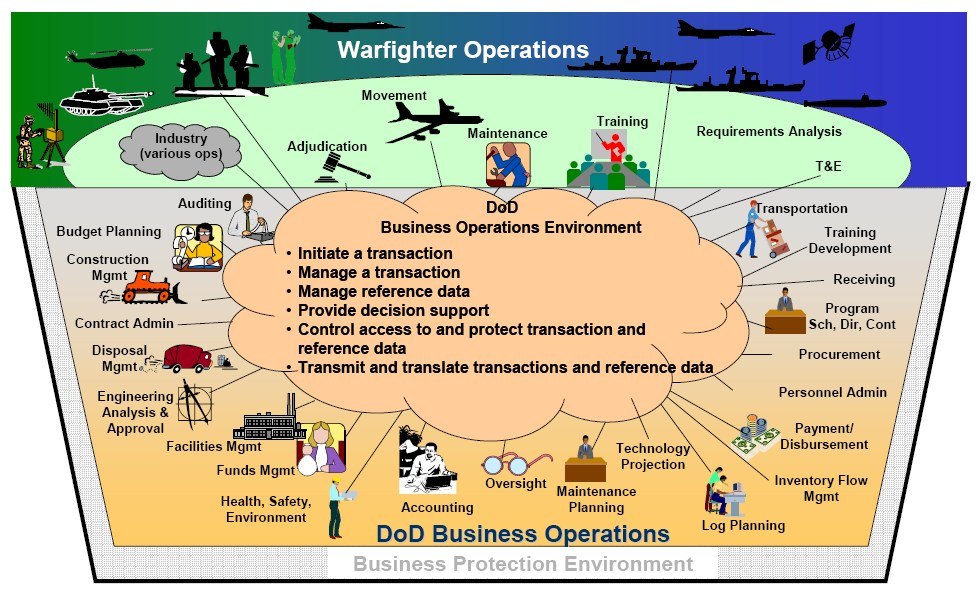
DoD Electronic Commerce Concept of Operations (OV-1).

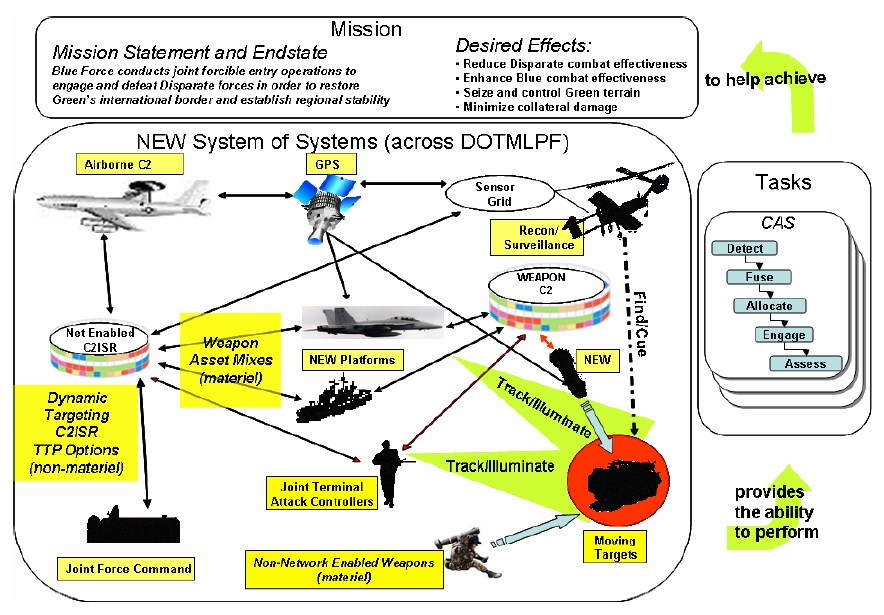
Joint Network Enabled Weapon (NEW) Capability Operational Concept Graphic (OV-1).

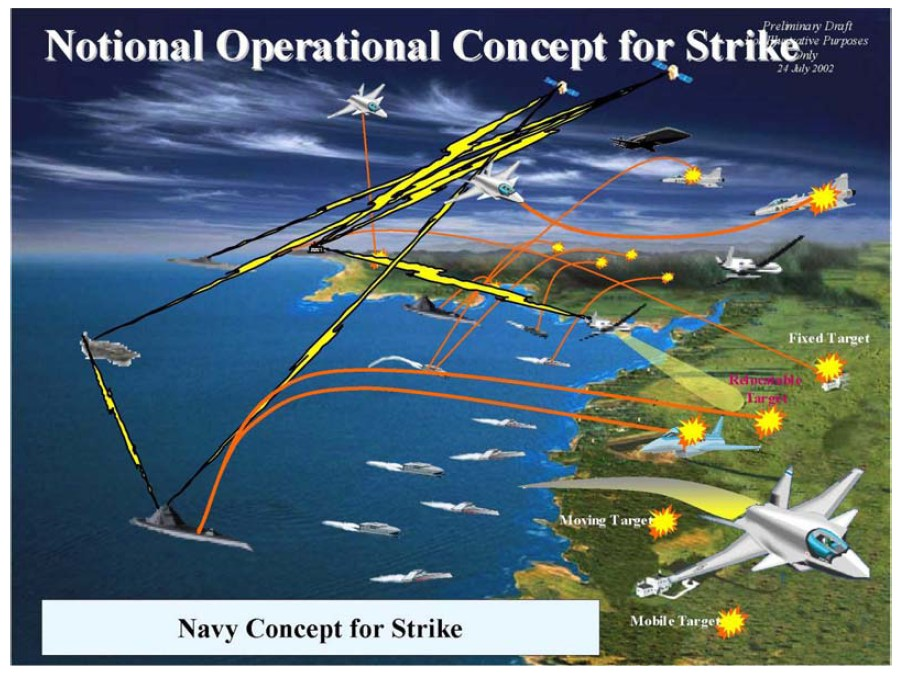
Joint Task Force Concept of Operations (OV-1).

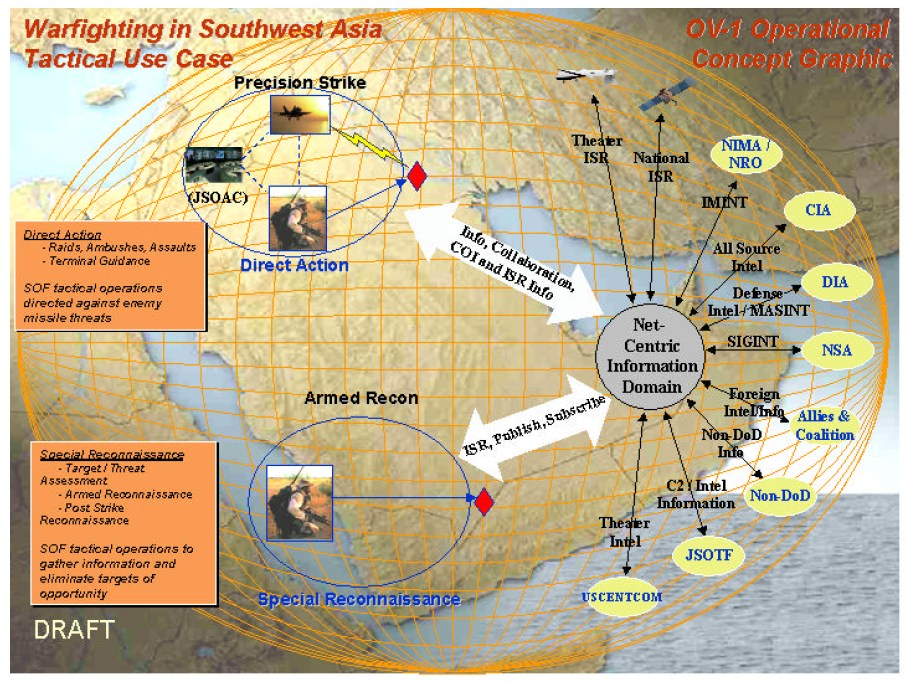
Example OV-1 for NCOW.
- High-Level Operational Concept Graphic (OV-1) : High level graphical and textual description of operational concept (high level organizations, missions, geographic configuration, connectivity, etc.).

==== Operational Node Connectivity Description ====
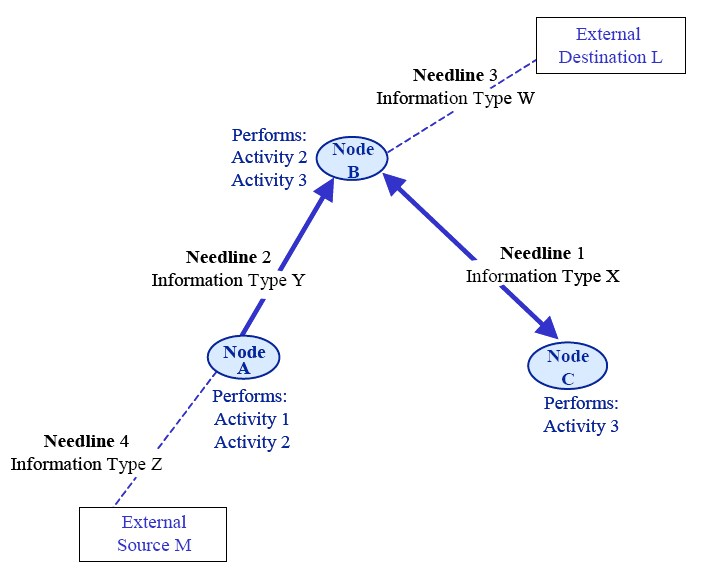
OV-2 Template.

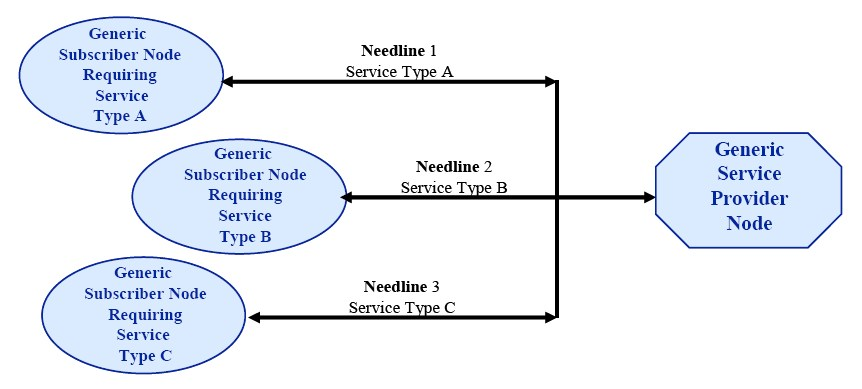
Notional Example of an OV-2 Depicting Service Providers.

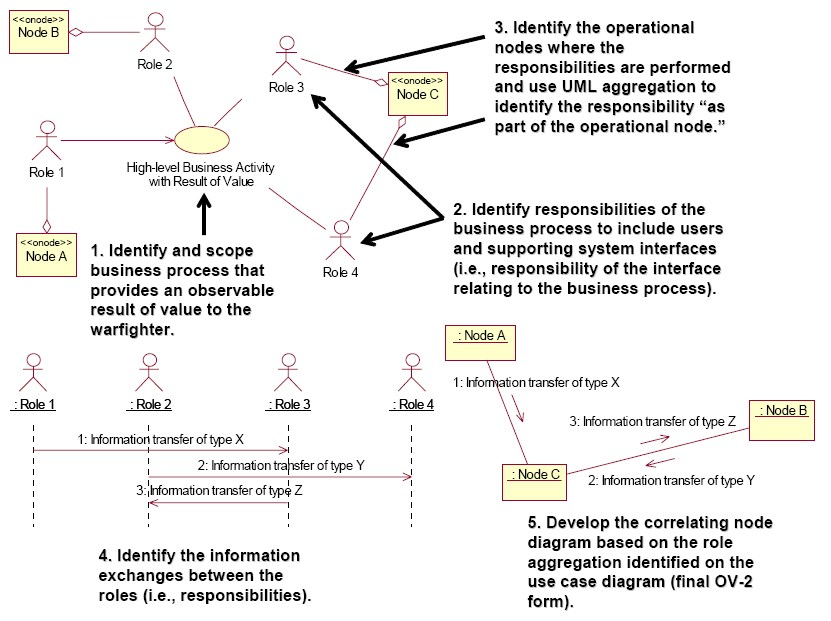
UML OV-2 Template.
- Operational Node Connectivity Description (OV-2) : Operational nodes, activities performed at each node, and connectivites and information flow between nodes.

==== Operational Information Exchange Matrix ====
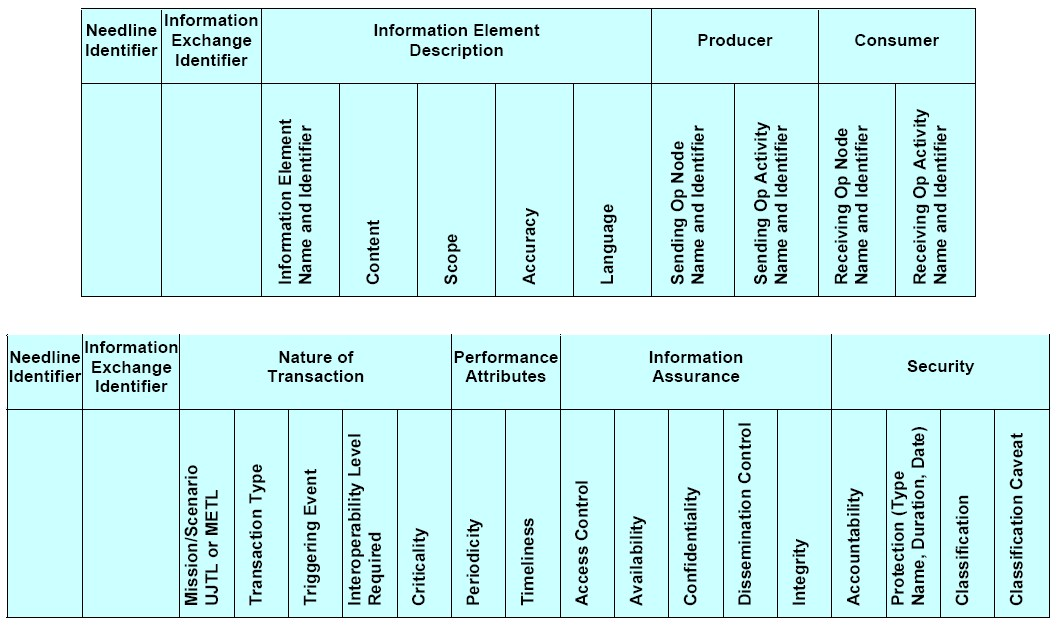
OV-3 – Template.
- Operational Information Exchange Matrix (OV-3) : Information exchanged between nodes and the relevant attributes of that exchange such as media, quality, quantity, and the level of interoperability required.

==== Organizational Relationships Chart ====
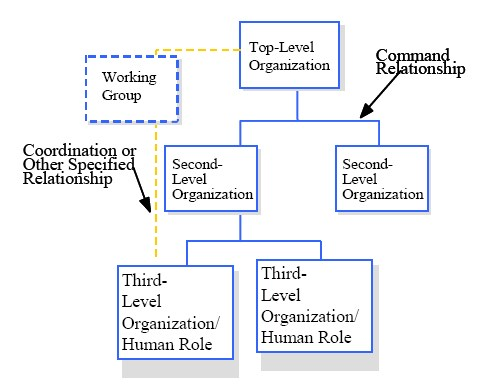
OV-4 – Template.

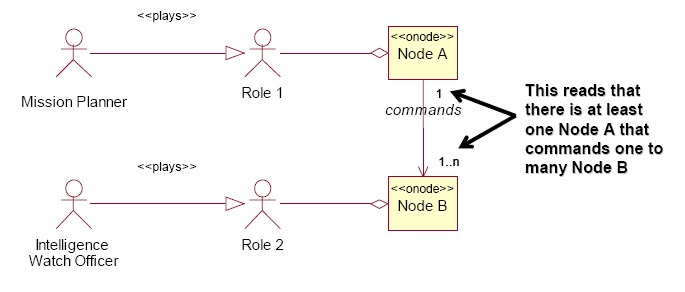
UML OV-4 Sample.
- Organizational Relationships Chart (OV-4) : Command, control, coordination, and other relationships among organizations.

==== Operational Activity Model ====
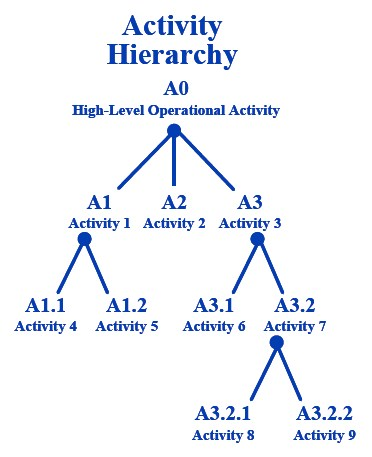
Operational Activity Hierarchy Chart (OV-5) – Template.

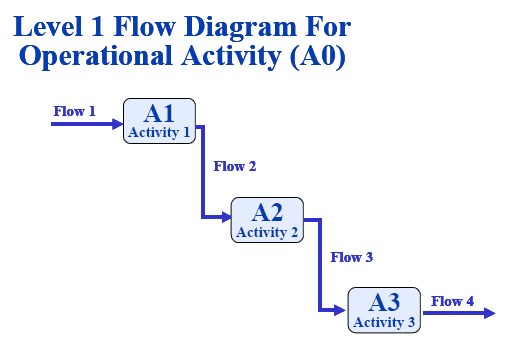
Operational Activity Diagram (OV-5) – Template.

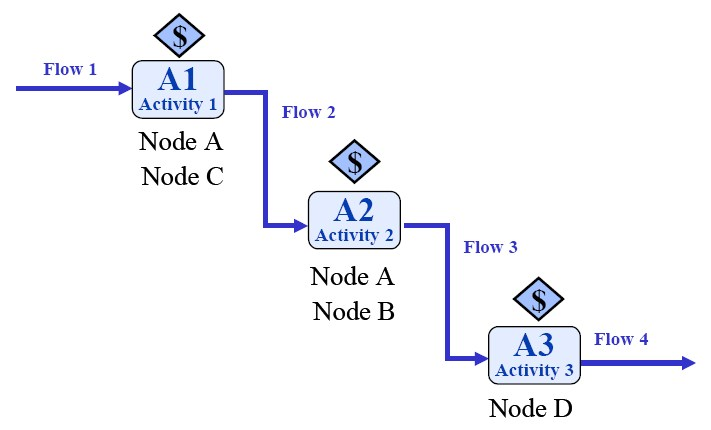
OV-5 – Template with Notional Annotations.

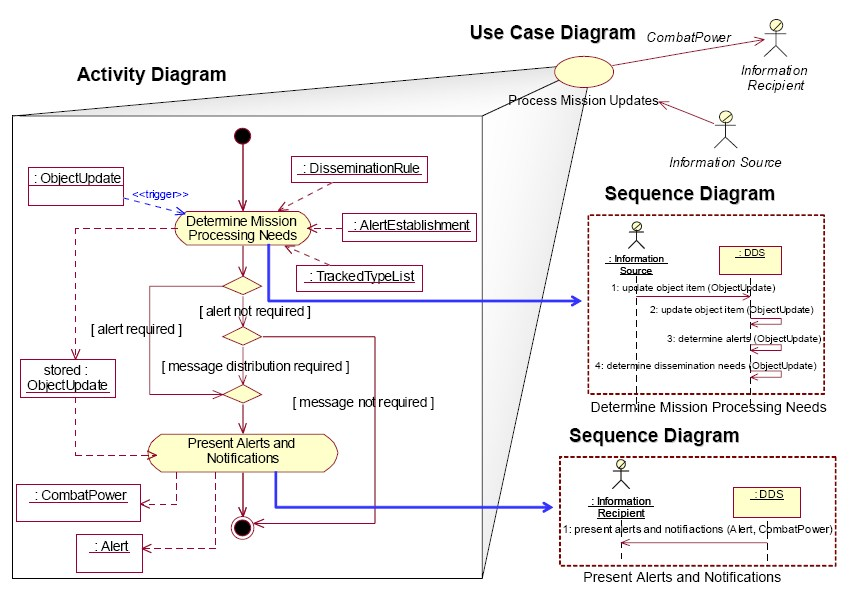
UML Example OV-5.
- Operational Activity Model (OV-5) : Activities, relationships among activities, inputs and outputs. In addition, overlays can show cost, performing nodes, or other pertinent information.

==== Other OV products ====
- Operational Rules Model, State Transition Description, and Event-Trace Description (OV-6a, 6b, and 6c)
  - Operational Rules Model (OV-6a) : One of the three products used to describe operational activity sequence and timing that identifies the business rules that constrain the operation.
  - Operational State Transition Description (OV-6b) : One of the three products used to describe operational activity sequence and timing that identifies responses of a business process to events.
  - Operational Event-Trace Description (OV-6c) : One of the three products used to describe operational activity sequence and timing that traces the actions in a scenario or critical sequence of events.
- Logical Data Model (OV-7) : Documentation of the data requirements and structural business process rules of the Operational View.

=== Executable Operational Architecture ===
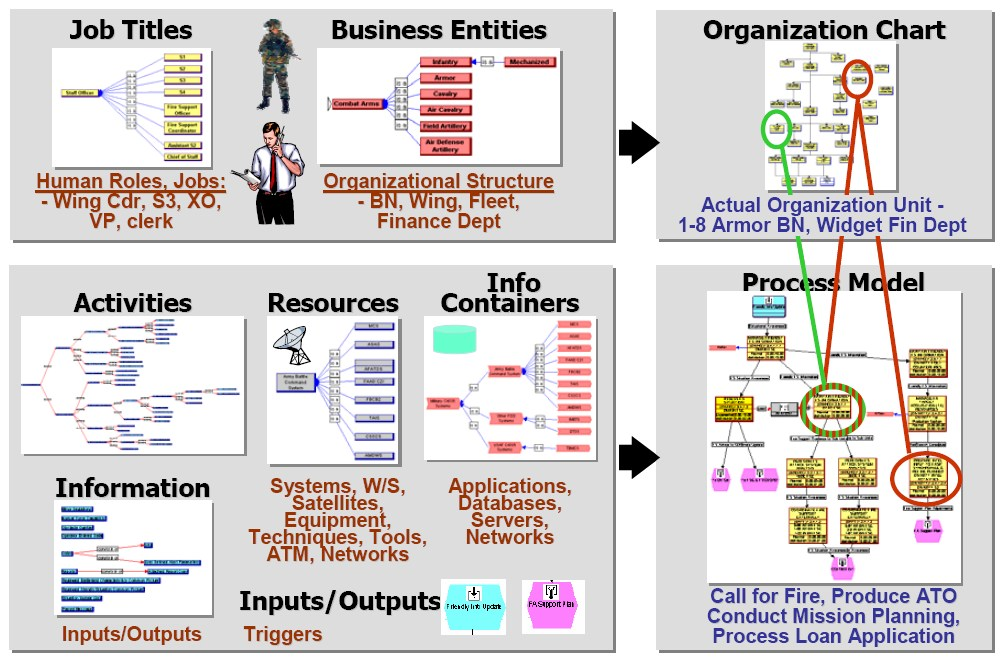
Anatomy of an Executable Operational Architecture.

In addition to examining behavior over time, one can also assess an overall dynamic mission cost over time in terms of human and system/network resource dollar costs and their processes dollar costs. Analysis of dollar costs in executable architectures is a first step in an architecture based investment strategy, where we eventually need to align architectures to funding decisions to ensure that investment decisions are directly linked to mission objectives and their outcomes. The figure on the right illustrates the anatomy of one such dynamic model.

State transitions in executable operational architectural models provide for descriptions of conditions that control the behavior of process events in responding to inputs and in producing outputs. A state specifies the response of a process to events. The response may vary depending on the current state and the rule set or conditions. Distribution settings determine process time executions. Examples of distribution strategies include: constant values, event list, constant interval spacing, normal distribution, exponential distribution, and so forth. Priority determines the processing strategy if two inputs reach a process at the same time. Higher priority inputs are usually processed before lower priority inputs.

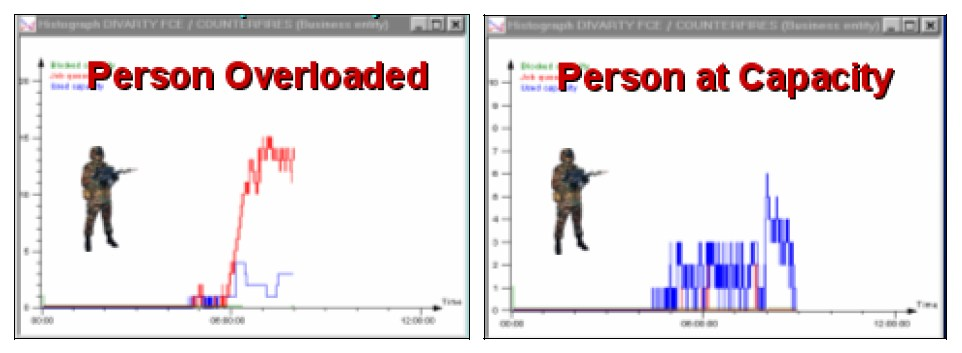
Sample Histograms Showing Results of a Simulation Run.

Processes receiving multiple inputs need to define how to respond. Examples of responses include: process each input in the order of arrival independent of each other, process only when all inputs are available, or process as soon as any input is detected. Processes producing multiple outputs can include probabilities (totaling 100 percent), under which each output would be produced. Histograms are examples of generated timing descriptions. They are graphic representations of processes, human and system resources, and their used capacity over time during a simulation run. These histograms are used to perform dynamic impact analysis of the behavior of the executable architecture. Figure 4-23 is an example showing the results of a simulation run of human resource capacity.

== See also ==
- Capability (systems engineering)
- Executable Architecture
- Concept of operations
