= All Points Bulletin (disambiguation) =

An all-points bulletin is a law enforcement information dissemination tool.

All Points Bulletin may also refer to:

- All Points Bulletin (album), an album by Dispatch
- APB (1987 video game), arcade game by Atari Games
- APB: All Points Bulletin, a previously discontinued 2010 massive multiplayer online game for Microsoft Windows
- APB (2017 TV series)

== See also ==
- APB (disambiguation)
