= Extended enterprise =

Firms that combine their economic output to provide products and services

An extended enterprise is a loosely coupled, self-organizing network of firms that combine their economic output to provide products and services offerings to the market. Firms in the extended enterprise may operate independently, for example, through market mechanisms, or cooperatively through agreements and contracts. They provide value added service or product to the OEM (Original Equipment Manufacturer).

Alternatively referred to as a supply chain or a value chain, the extended enterprise describes the community of participants involved with provisioning a set of service offerings. The extended enterprise associated with "McDonald's", for example, includes not only McDonald's Corporation, but also franchisees and joint venture partners of McDonald's Corporation, the 3PLs that provide food and materials to McDonald's restaurants, the advertising agencies that produce and distribute McDonald's advertising, the suppliers of McDonald's food ingredients, kitchen equipment, building services, utilities, and other goods and services, the designers of Happy Meal toys, and others.

Extended enterprise is a more descriptive term than supply chain, in that it permits the notion of different types and degrees and permanence of connectivity. Connections may be by contract, as in partnerships or alliances or trade agreements, or by open market exchange or participation in public tariffs.

How an extended enterprise is organized and structured and its policies and mechanisms for the exchange of information, goods, services and money is described by the enterprise architecture.

== Adoption ==
The notion of the extended enterprise has taken on more importance as firms have become more specialized and inter-connected, trade has become more global, processes have become more standardized and information has become ubiquitous. The standardization of business processes has permitted companies to purchase as services many of the activities that previously had been provided directly by the business entity. By outsourcing certain business functions that had been previously self-provided, such as transportation, warehousing, procurement, public relations, information technology, firms have been able to concentrate their resources on those investments and activities that provide them the greatest rate of return. The remaining "core competencies" determine the firm's unique value proposition.

Recently, the notion of extended enterprise has been updated by Alguezaui and Filieri (2014) who have reconceptualized the extended enterprise in the knowledge economy.
