= Dorothy A. Leonard =

American professor of business administration

Dorothy A. Leonard (born 1942) is an American professor of business administration specialized in knowledge management. She is the William J. Abernathy professor of business administration emerita at the Harvard Business School.

== Education ==
Leonard completed a Ph.D. at Stanford University.

== Career ==
Leonard worked in Southeast Asia for ten years. She taught at the MIT Sloan School of Management for three years. In 1983, Leonard joined the Harvard Business School. She researches knowledge management for innovation and methods of increasing creativity in groups.

== Personal life ==
Leonard was married to management consultant Ronald B. Barton. Barton died September 19, 1995.

== Selected works ==
- Leonard-Barton, Dorothy (1995). Wellsprings of Knowledge: Building and Sustaining the Sources of Innovation. Harvard Business School Press. ISBN 978-0-87584-612-5.
- Leonard-Barton, Dorothy; Swap, Walter C. (1999). When Sparks Fly: Igniting Creativity in Groups. Harvard Business Press. ISBN 978-0-87584-865-5.
- Leonard-Barton, Dorothy; Swap, Walter C. (2005). Deep Smarts: How to Cultivate and Transfer Enduring Business Wisdom. Harvard Business Press. ISBN 978-1-59139-528-7.
- Leonard, Dorothy A (2011). Managing Knowledge Assets, Creativity and Innovation. World Scientific. doi:10.1142/7638. ISBN 978-981-4295-49-9.
- Leonard-Barton, Dorothy; Swap, Walter C.; Barton, Gavin (2015). Critical Knowledge Transfer: Tools for Managing Your Company's Deep Smarts. Harvard Business Press. ISBN 978-1-4221-6811-0.
