= Mission Need Statement =

Within the context of the U.S. Department of Defense, a Mission Needs Statement (MNS) was a type of document which identified capability needs for a program to satisfy by a combination of solutions (DOTMLPF) to resolve a mission deficiency or to enhance operational capability.

This term was introduced as a fundamental step in CJCSI 3170.01B (Apr 2001), 6212.01D (Apr 2005), and the Interim Defense Acquisition Guidebook (Oct 2004).

This type of document has been superseded by the description of capability needs called an Initial Capabilities Document, as of CJCSI 3170.01E. The CJCSI 3170.01 and 6212.01 were superseded by the CJCSI 5123.01 Series.
