= DOTMLPF =

United States Department of Defense acronym

DOTMLPF (pronounced "Dot-MiL-P-F") stands for doctrine, organization, training, materiel, leadership and education, personnel, and facilities. It is a capability-based analytical framework used by the United States Department of Defense to determine how best to improve a military capability. When military organizations identify an significant change in future mission requirements, the framework is used to evaluate whether the problem can be solved through changes in doctrine, organization, training, materiel, leadership and education, personnel, facilities, or a combination of these elements. The framework is also applied to help military planners consider how a change in the character of warfare will affect these seven elements of military operations.

== Purpose ==
The DOTMLPF framework is used by the United States Department of Defense to analyze potential solutions to identified military capability gaps. Rather than presuming that a new weapon system or other materiel acquisition is required, the framework evaluates whether changes to doctrine, organization, training, materiel, leadership and education, personnel, facilities, or a combination of these elements would most effectively provide the required capability.

DOTMLPF analysis is a component of the Joint Capabilities Integration and Development System (JCIDS), the Department of Defense's requirements development process for identifying, validating, and prioritizing military capability requirements. Within JCIDS, capability gaps are assessed and potential solutions may include non-materiel changes, new materiel capabilities, or an integrated combination of both.

== Application ==
DOTMLPF is applied throughout the Department of Defense's capability development activities to evaluate potential solutions to validated military capability requirements. Rather than functioning as a sequential process or checklist, the framework provides a structured means of considering how changes across doctrine, organization, training, materiel, leadership and education, personnel, and facilities may individually or collectively improve military capability. Depending on the nature of the capability gap, the analysis may conclude that a non-materiel solution is sufficient, that new materiel is required, or that the most effective solution is an integrated combination of multiple DOTMLPF elements.

Within the Joint Capabilities Integration and Development System (JCIDS), DOTMLPF analysis commonly supports Capability-Based Assessments (CBAs), where operational capability gaps are identified and potential approaches for addressing those gaps are evaluated. Recommendations resulting from these analyses may lead to changes in doctrine, organization, training, leadership and education, personnel, facilities, or to the development of new materiel capabilities through the defense acquisition process.

Although frequently associated with JCIDS, DOTMLPF is also employed more broadly in Joint Force Development, concept development, force modernization, and service-level capability planning to ensure that capability improvements consider both materiel and non-materiel alternatives before pursuing acquisition-based solutions.

== Variants ==
Several organizations have expanded the original DOTMLPF framework by adding additional elements to address specific capability development needs.

=== DOTMLPF-I (NATO) ===
NATO uses the acronym, DOTMLPF-I, the "I" standing for "Interoperability", meaning the ability to be interoperable with forces throughout the NATO alliance. NATOs AJP-01 Allied Joint Doctrine (2022) describes interoperability as the "ability of NATO, other political departments, agencies and, when appropriate, forces of partner nations to act together coherently, effectively and efficiently to achieve Allied tactical, operational and strategic objectives". Interoperability can be achieved within the three dimensions of interoperability; the technical, the procedural and the human dimension.

Allied Command Transformation (originally dual-hatted with Commander United States Joint Forces Command adopted the DOTMLPF framework used by the United States Department of Defense. The extension "–I", was added to reflect that in the NATO alliance, capabilities must be designed to be interoperable across all seven capability dimensions. This means national Doctrine and procedures must be aligned with Allied Doctrine, Training and exercise programmes must be coordinated so that allied forces can act together, military organizational structures must be harmonized so that they can be seamlessly integrated into NATO's Command and Force Structure, Material and technology components must be designed so that they can be interchanged or interconnected between Allies etc.

NATO's capability development (CAPDEV) is part of the NATO Defence Planning Process (NDPP), where DOTMLPF-I is used as a framework to test and develop these concepts and capabilities. While developing a concept, NATO describes two orientations; either to transform or to find a solution. NATO CD&E Handbook (2021) describes using the DOTMLPF-I framework and the lines of development when trying to find the solution.

=== DOTMLPFI-IE (Norway) ===
The Norwegian Armed Forces (NAF) used the DOTMLPFI framework to develop a 'total project plan' (TPP) in investment processes. The TPP was formalized in the NAF in 2018. The TPP is formed in close coordination with the project plan developed by NDMA, and where the project plan covers how the materiel procurement is managed, the TPP covers all the factors needed for the procurement to reach the business goals and achieve the operative benefits of the investment.

However, to ensure all factors in materiel investments are taken into consideration, prior to the NAF being ready to start using materiel and equipment, they added an I for Information systems and E for Economy.

=== DOTMLPF-IE (Information Systems) ===
Information systems include communication systems, battle management systems, radios or information security. Economy was added to emphasize lifecycle operating costs after studies by the Norwegian Defence Research Establishment (FFI) concluded that operating costs had historically received insufficient consideration in investment decisions.
