= Joint capability areas =

Within the United States Department of Defense, the Joint Capability Areas (JCA) are a standardized set of United States military definitions that cover the complete range of military activities. The system was initially established in May 2005 by the United States Department of Defense Joint Staff with input from each of the services, designed to begin "a new framework that paves the way for side-by-side comparisons of service contributions to joint warfighting and a tool that will assist decision-makers in deciding whether to move resources between service budgets."

The establishment of the JCA was primarily a result of an Operational Availability study from 2005 and from the Joint Defense Capabilities Study of 2003 (also referred to as the Aldridge Study after its primary author, Edward Aldridge). The Aldridge study called for the establishment of a new joint lexicon that would allow leaders to clearly discuss mission areas and how to most responsibly manage resources.

Further information on JCAs can be found at the Joint Experimentation, Transformation and Concepts Division (JETCD) of the Joint Staff J-7, Operational Plans and Joint Force Development Directorate.

== Current Joint Capability Areas ==
1. Force Integration
2. Battlespace Awareness (a.k.a. INTEL)
3. Force Application (FA)
4. Logistics (LOG)
5. Command and Control (C2)
6. Communications & Computers
7. Protection (FP)
8. Corporate Management and Support (CMS)

== Initial Joint Capability Areas ==
- Joint battlespace awareness
- Joint command and control
- Joint network operations
- Joint interagency coordination
- Joint public affairs operations
- Joint information operations
- Joint protection
- Joint logistics
- Joint force generation
- Joint force management
- Joint homeland defense
- Joint strategic deterrence
- Joint shaping and security cooperation
- Joint stability operations
- Joint civil support
- Joint non-traditional operations
- Joint access and access denial operations
- Joint land control operations
- Joint maritime/littoral control operations
- Joint air control operations
- Joint space control operations
