= Military acquisition =

Management and procurement process

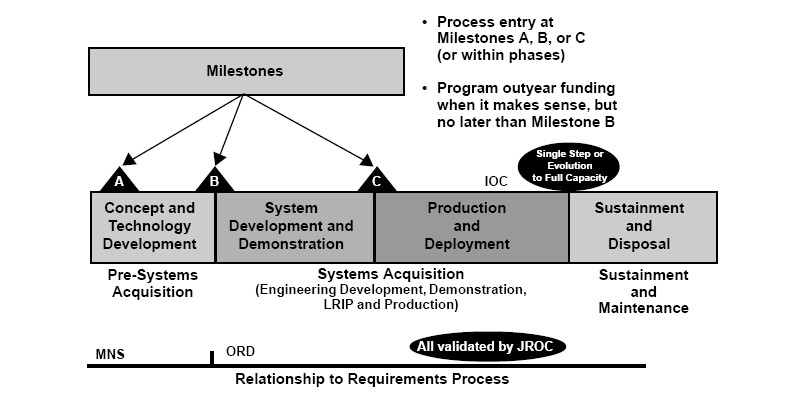
US DoD Acquisition Process

Military acquisition or defense acquisition is the "bureaucratic management and procurement process", dealing with a nation's investments in the technologies, programs, and product support necessary to achieve its national security strategy and support its armed forces. Its objective is to acquire products that satisfy specified needs and provide measurable improvement to mission capability at a fair and reasonable price.

== Concept ==
Military acquisition has a long history spanning from ancient times (e.g., blacksmithing, shipbuilding) to modern times.

Modern military acquisition is a complex blend of science, management, and engineering disciplines within the context of a nation's law and regulation framework to produce military material and technology. This complexity evolved from the increasing complexity of weapon systems starting in the 20th century. For example, the Manhattan Project involved more than 130,000 people at an estimated cost of nearly $24 billion in 2008 dollars.

In the twenty-first century, the trend has been for countries to cooperate in military procurement, due to the rising cost-per-unit of digital age military hardware such as ships and jets. For example, Nordic Defence Cooperation (established 2009), a grouping of Nordic countries that cooperate in defence spending, the Defence and Security Co-operation Treaty, signed between the United Kingdom and France in 2010, and Joint Strike Fighter program, which selected the Lockheed Martin F-35 Lightning II in 2001, included the United States, the United Kingdom, Australia, Italy, Canada, the Netherlands, Norway, Denmark, Turkey, Israel and Japan.

== Activities ==
Major activities related to military acquisition are:

- Project management/program management
  - Risk management
  - Earned value management
- Product management
  - Product life cycle management
- Contract management
- Systems engineering
- Software engineering
- Computer engineering
- Human factors
- Modeling and simulation
- Security
- Procurement

== In the European Union ==
Defence spending in the EU is a member state responsibility. In 2024, combined EU defence procurement amounted to €326bn, which represented 1.9% of the EU's combined gross domestic product.

Member states' procurement of arms, munitions, war material and related works and services acquired for defence purposes and procurement of sensitive supplies, works and services required for security purposes are subject to the EU's Directive 2009/81/EC on Defence and Sensitive Security Procurement. The purpose of the directive is to balance the need for transparency and openness in defence markets within the European single market with the need to protect individual countries' security interests. Like all EU directives, its requirements need to be transposed into the domestic laws of each member state.

In Austria, the Directive has been transposed into national law through the Bundesgesetz über die Vergabe von Aufträgen im Verteidigungs- und Sicherheitsbereich of 2012 ("Federal Law on the awarding of public contracts in the field of defence and security"), BVergGVS 2012.

== In the United Kingdom ==
The Defence and Security Public Contracts Regulations 2011, which were derived from EU law, apply to defence procurement in the UK, along with Parts 1 and 2 of the Defence Reform Act 2014. A white paper entitled Better Defence Acquisition: Improving how we procure and support Defence equipment was published in June 2013, taking forward the reform of defence procurement, equipment support, single-source supply arrangements and logistics in the UK. The white paper included a requirement for the department's large sole-source suppliers to report annually on their engagement with small and medium-sized enterprises and their involvement in their supply chains. The Defence Reform Act established a statutory "Single Source" scheme applicable to situations where there is no competition between suppliers.

The UK government refers to "smart procurement", since renamed as "smart acquisition", which aims to deliver equipment for military purposes "faster, cheaper, better". The Defence Industrial Policy paper published in 2002 claimed that "the Strategic Defence Review, and in particular the Smart Acquisition reforms, had "placed new demands on [the] defence industry" ... and created "a new emphasis on closer co-operation and openness in our [government] relationship with industry". This paper made reference to the Ministry of Defence making its acquisition decisions "more transparent and inclusive", recognising that transparency was linked to the development of a competitive UK defence industry on which the armed forces could rely for more of its supply and equipment needs. Information about "the factors that affect acquisition decisions" was expected to help potential bidders form their business proposals in line with government needs.

== In the United States ==
The US Department of Defense has three principal decision-making support systems associated with military acquisition:

- Planning, Programming, Budgeting and Execution (PPBE) Process: the process for strategic planning, program development, and resource determination.
- Joint Capabilities Integration and Development System: a systematic method established by the Joint Chiefs of Staff for assessing gaps in military joint warfighting capabilities and recommending solutions to resolve these gaps.
- Defense Acquisition System: the management process used to acquire weapon systems and automated information system.

The Center for Strategic & International Studies releases a report every year on defense acquisition trends.

United States procurement regulations mandate the use of competitive procurement processes where possible. The joint session of Congress which approved passage of the National Defense Authorization Act for Fiscal Year 2012 directed the Government Accountability Office (GAO) to report for three years on the Department of Defense's use of competitive tendering procedures, for which reports were completed in 2013, 2014, and 2015. GAO found that in fiscal year 2014, DOD obligated $284.4 billion through contracts and task orders, of which 58.2 percent was competed. The use of competitive procedures ranged from 60.8% to 56.5% during the period from fiscal year 2010 through fiscal year 2014, with acquisition teams often citing "only one responsible source" as the reason who competition would not be effective. The department issued a directive to staff in August 2014 entitled Actions to Improve Department of Defense Competition, which instructed contracting officers to seek feedback from companies when they have expressed early interest in supplying goods and services but subsequently failed to submit an offer.

Because of the size and scope of its acquisition bureaucracy, in 1991 the Department of Defense instituted an extensive training program, known as the Defense Acquisition University.

== In Canada ==
In Canada, responsibility for military acquisition is shared between three separate government departments: Public Services and Procurement Canada (PSPC); the Department of National Defence (DND); and Innovation, Science and Economic Development (ISED).

- PSPC is responsible for overseeing and managing the proposal solicitation and evaluation process, and once under contract, PSPC manages the contract on behalf of DND.
- DND is responsible for a four step process:
1. Identify the need for a new or improved capability;
2. Analyze the available options to address the identified need;
3. If external procurement is the result of the optional analysis, then defining the requirements and budget for the procured solution; and
4. Implementing the defined solution. (Note: Note: A fifth step, closeout, is not relevant to this description.)

ISED is responsible for defining and administering the Industrial and Technological Benefits (ITB) and Value Proposition (VP), which are offsets applied to the selected defense procurements. ISED may apply offsets to DND and Coast Guard procurements of $20M (CAD, or about $15M USD) or greater.

All Canadian defence procurement falls under the auspices of the Treasury Board of Canada, which establishes national procurement and contracting standards and regulations on behalf of the Government of Canada.

== See also ==
- Analysis of Alternatives
- Defence Equipment and Support (UK)
- Defence Materiel Organisation (Australia)
- Defense Acquisition University (US)
- Integrated Logistics Support
- Joint Capabilities Integration Development System
- Logistics Support Analysis
- Procurement
- Under Secretary of Defense for Acquisition, Technology and Logistics
- Government procurement – includes details of relevant procurement law affecting defence procurement in a number of other states.
