= Customer value proposition =

Benefits a vendor promises a customer will receive

In marketing, a customer value proposition (CVP) consists of the sum total of benefits which a vendor promises a customer will receive in return for the customer's associated payment (or other value-transfer).

Customer Value Management was started by Mahamed Mahamud in the 1980s and discussed in his book, Mastering Customer Value Management. A customer value proposition is a business or marketing statement that describes why a customer should buy a product or use a service. It is specifically targeted towards potential customers rather than other constituent groups such as employees, partners or suppliers. Similar to the unique selling proposition, it is a clearly defined statement that is designed to convince customers that one particular product or service will add more value or better solve a problem than others in its competitive set.

== Why CVPs are important ==
Mark De Leon's value proposition will provide convincing reasons why a customer should buy a product, and also differentiate your product from competitors. Gaining a customer's attention and approval will help build sales faster and more profitably, as well as work to increase market share. Understanding customer needs is important because it helps promote the product. A brand is the perception of a product, service or company that is designed to stay in the minds of targeted consumers. Customers often use "mental shortcuts" to make purchase decisions, meaning that they rely on brand familiarity to make faster decisions.

== What is a CVP ==
A customer value proposition is a promise of potential value that a business delivers to its customers and in essence is the reason why a customer would choose to engage with the business. It is concise statement that highlights the relevance of a product offering by explaining how it solves a problem or improves the customer's situation, the specific value against the customer's needs and the difference to competitors.

The promise of value is often expressed as a solution that the business provides to help a customer solve a problem. This way of thinking about customer value proposition has been popularised by books such as the Lean Startup. It also argued that this view is simplistic as it misses the nuances of human emotions, which can have a big impact on the way customers perceive value.

Customer Value Proposition is a complicated principle however, it is the main theory behind the existence and the survival of a business or a company. Value proposition means that extra values and benefits should be added to the firm's products. Due to the high rate of competition between businesses with similar products in the market, value proposition enables companies to differentiate the brands from each other helping the customers to choose the most valuable brand of product which will provide them with most benefits and advantages. Once the business receives the attention they require from their target market through the use of customer value proposition they can increase their sales and gain more profit along with the number of consumers.

== Business method ==
For a business to have a customer value proposition, there is a set of key components that businesses need to focus, discuss and follow in order to gain and achieve success. The key components are: "developing a customer value proposition starts with an analysis of customers' needs, competitors' offerings, and the firm's strength to be outstanding within the share market."

Firstly, any business must give importance to their target market by gathering relevant information on their consumers' requirements and create possible solutions which could be used as a substitute to resolve their problems. Knowing and researching the potential customer enterprises and requirements of the target market can be done through multiple theoretical and practical methods. For example: the use of surveys is an excellent way to identify and gain an understanding of consumers' points of view. It is necessary to apply the knowledge gained from understanding the consumer's point of view when the process of production occurs.

Knowing the benefits and value that the developed product will provide to the target audience is extremely vital. Products, services or the idea presented by businesses are used in order to improve human hardship and compromising the attributes that best suits the needs of the targeted consumers. Therefore, firms have to think of methods by which they can promote the benefits of the product in such a way that their targeted consumers will be willing to show interest in investing in the product.

Owing to competition, businesses must know their industry segments and identify the advantages and disadvantages produced by their brand to acquire their targeted consumers, as the objective is to produce a product that is different from what is offered by competitors.

Lastly, before finalizing it is vital to advertise the product to the consumers to create awareness. The promotion of the product must include the benefits and values that the product contains in order to inspire and interest the targeted consumers into investing in the product or service offered by the firm. If businesses sell their product cost-efficiently to their customers and provide the best experience through the use of their products, then it is expected that existing customers will "spread the word" increasing sales and profit for the business. However, it is important that the business ensures at all times that they are satisfying the needs of their consumers according to the customer value proposition as firms can face a lack of profit and sales if the consumers are not satisfied with the brand of product at any point of time.

== Competitive advantage ==
A product with a successful customer value proposition is directly linked to a product's actual and sustained performance versus competition. The two main attributes that allow consumers to differentiate among products are price and quality. Finding the correct balance between these two attributes usually leads to a successful product. If a company is able to produce the same quality product as its direct competition but sell it for less, this provides a price value to the consumer. Similarly, if a company is able to produce a superior quality product for the same or a slightly higher but acceptable price, the value to the consumer is added through the quality of the product. A product must offer value through price and/or quality in order to be successful.

Competitive advantage can come in a range of ways, such as pricing, packaging, layout, looks, services provided and more. All these can add value proposition to a product, therefore making it worth more, and more desirable to a customer. However, with the modern technology available to firms, it makes information that could help firms to gain competitive advantage over their rivals, far easier to obtain. However rapidly increasing sophisticated technology such as online cookies, mobile phone location tracking and facial recognition can leave consumers with a growing sense of unease, and leave companies trying not to be thought of as a "creep" company (Roland, L. 2013). Different ways are being thought up in order to find different sources and avenues to extract information that could help a firm gain competitive advantage. Such as " The responsible and transparent management of consumers personal data could well be the new battleground for competitive advantage"(Roland, L. 2013). With multiple sale strategies being enforced at once in order gain competitive advantage over rivals, trust starts to decline and consumers don't know whether to trust the people selling them a particular product, or idea as they do not know their intentions. "It is difficult to distinguish between exchange partners that are actually trustworthy and those that only claim to be trustworthy" (Williamson, 1985).

Employees, and how the employees make the customer feel, are keys components of Customer value proposition (CVP), as well as competitive advantage. Employees can add value to a company, which then in turn increase their competitive advantage by a range of small, yet highly useful actions. Employers who know what they are selling, and can assist the customer with their queries, can make the customer feel at ease and add high value to a company/firm. A study done by "Buzzell and gale" show that to a customer, the "service" they receive accounts for 14% of the importance as to whether they buy the product or not (Buzzell, 2002). Over time and with multiple sales, the percentage will have a high impact on a firm and then will have a "ripple effect" that will add value to the customer as well. This percentage reinforces the idea that service is a crucial competitive advantage. The company/firm with the best service has higher chance to outsell their competitors and rivals.

Whilst employee relations are a key to a successful competitive advantage over rivals, other factors such as reliability, reputation, options, and performance are all crucial customer value propositions. Buzzell and Gales study also show that these factors combined, equate to 59% of what customers deem to be important factors in a purchase (Buzzell, 2002). These particular factors are all factors that do not relate to price or quality. Showing that a company/ firm can generate customer value proposition and competitive advantage over their rivals without having to have the cheapest price, or necessarily the best quality. Balance is crucial in having a product that customers will be happy to pay a reasonable price for, along with the customers feeling safe in their purchase, and feel like once they have brought their product they will get the quality they expected/ or hoped for.

== Target audiences ==
- End user – The initial and ongoing satisfaction of the end user is the goal of every business. Customer satisfaction is achieved when superior customer value is delivered. Establishing a lasting business relationship will lead to future sales. Price and quality are the most important factors in a consumer purchase.
- Market Segmentation divides markets into smaller segments by which they can match their needs and requirements. The smaller segments are then turned into target markets. (P. Kotler, S. Burton, K. Deans, L. Brown, G. Armstrong, 2013) End users are known as the key targeted consumers who are the main users of the product. Thus, the product is produced and established according to their needs and purposes. There could be more than one group of targeted consumers hence, in that situation it is important that the requirements of the different groups are identified individually. Most vital information that any business should be aware of is the background demographics of their target market to gain a broad understanding and positive approach towards their needs and requirements. (Hudadoff, 2009)
- Manufacturer/Distributor – When the sales target is not the end user, but a manufacturer or distributor of a product, the most important factor is conveying superiority of one product over another. There may be other factors besides price and quality that would affect a customer's decision and communicating those as well is essential.

== Types ==
1. All Benefits – Most managers when asked to construct a customer value proposition, simply list all the benefits they believe that their offering might deliver to target customers. The more they can think of the better. This approach requires the least knowledge about customers and competitors and, thus, results in a weaker marketplace effort.
2. Favorable Points of Difference – The second type of value proposition explicitly recognizes that the customer has alternatives and focuses on how to differentiate one product or service from another. Knowing that an element of an offering is a point of difference relative to the next best alternative does not, however, convey the value of this difference to target customers. A product or service may have several points of difference, complicating the customer's understanding of which ones deliver the greatest value. Without a detailed understanding of customer's requirements and preferences, and what it is worth to fulfill them, suppliers may stress points of difference that deliver relatively little value to the target customer.
3. Resonating Focus – The favorable points of difference in value proposition is preferable to an All Benefits proposition for companies crafting a customer value proposition. The resonating focus value proposition should be the gold standard. This approach acknowledges that the managers who make purchase decisions have major, ever-increasing levels of responsibility and often are pressed for time. They want to do business with suppliers that fully grasp critical issues in their business and deliver a customer value proposition that's simple yet powerfully captivating. Suppliers can provide a customer value proposition by making their offerings superior on the few attributes that are most important to target customers in demonstrating and documenting the value of this superior performance, and communicating it in a way that conveys a sophisticated understanding of the customer's business priorities.

Value Proposition	All Benefits	Favorable Points of Difference	Resonating Focus
Consists of:	All benefits customers receive from a market offering	All favorable points of difference a market offering has relative to the next best alternative	The key points of difference(and, perhaps, a point of parity) whose improvement will deliver the greatest value to the customer for the foreseeable future
Answers the customer question:	"Why should our firm purchase your offering?"	"Why should our firm purchase your offering instead of your competitor's?"	"What is most worthwhile for our firm to keep in mind about your offering?"
Requires:	Knowledge of own market offering	Knowledge of own market offering and next best alternative	Knowledge of how own market offering delivers superior value to customers, compared with next best alternative
Has the potential pitfall	Benefit assertion	Value Presumption	Requires customer value research

== See also ==
- Business model
- Customer relationship management
- Customer
