= Acquisition Program Baseline =

Acquisition Program Baseline (APB) is a term used by the United States Department of Defense to refer to a program threshold and objective values for the minimum number of cost, schedule, and performance attributes that describe the program over its life cycle. The APB initially was developed by the PM for the Milestone B decisions and contains parameters for the program such as key cost, schedule, and performance goals.
