= Capability (systems engineering) =

A capability, in the systems engineering sense, is defined as the ability to execute a specified course of action. A capability may or may not be accompanied by an intention. The term is used in the defense industry but also in private industry (e.g. gap analysis).

== Capability gap analysis ==
The Joint Capabilities Integration Development System is an important part of DoD military planning. The "Operation of the JCIDS" introduces a Capability Based Analysis (CBA) process that includes identification of capability gaps. In essence, a Capability Gap Analysis is the determination of needed capabilities that do not yet exist. The Department of Defense Architecture Framework (DoDAF) suggests the use of the Operational Activity Model (OV-5) in conducting a CGA.

== See also ==
- Capability management
- Operational Activity Model (OV-5)
- Operational Event-Trace Description (OV-6c)
- Joint Capabilities Integration Development System
