= Kjell G. Nyborg =

Financial Economist

Academic background
- Education: Stanford University (Ph.D.); University of Chicago (S.B.)

Academic work
- Discipline: Corporate Finance; Auction Theory; Monetary economics; Central Banking
- Institutions: University of Zurich; Norwegian School of Economics; UCLA Anderson School of Management; London Business School
- Website: nyborg.ch; Information at IDEAS / RePEc

Kjell G. Nyborg (born 1963) is a financial economist. Since 2009, he has been a Chaired Professor of Finance at the University of Zurich, Department of Banking and Finance, where he is currently also Vice Director. In addition, he is a Senior Chair of the Swiss Finance Institute (SFI), a Research Fellow of the Centre for Economic Policy Research (CEPR), and a Fellow of the Royal Society of Arts. Nyborg is the President of the European Finance Association for 2017 as well as a former Director and Vice President. He has worked on a broad range of topics. The focus in his more recent work is on the role of money, liquidity, and collateral in Financial markets. He has also written extensively on financial auctions and Corporate Finance. His book Collateral Frameworks: The Open Secret of Central Banks on Cambridge University Press (2017) lays bare the "hidden" workings and practices of central banks. In the book he argues that more focus should be placed on central bank collateral policy as an important and integral component of monetary policy.

== Career ==
Nyborg holds a Ph.D., with a specialization in Finance, from the Stanford Graduate School of Business and an S.B. in Mathematics with General Honors (and Sigma Xi) from the University of Chicago. His past positions include Assistant and Associate Professor of Finance at the London Business School, visiting Associate Professor of Finance at UCLA Anderson School of Management, and visiting economist at the European Central Bank. Prior to coming to the University of Zurich, he held the DnB NOR Chair of Finance at the Norwegian School of Economics (NHH).

Professor Nyborg has served on the executive committee of the European Finance Association (EFA) since January 2013, first as a Director and, in 2016, as vice president. He is the President of the EFA for 2017 and served as the Program Chair of the EFA's 43rd Annual Meeting (Oslo, 2016).

Nyborg has previously also held a part-time position as Academic Director of the Global Finance Academy at University College Dublin and is currently part-time Visiting Scholar in the Norwegian Central Bank (Norges Bank) and part-time Visiting Professor at BI Norwegian Business School.

== Collateral Frameworks ==
Nyborg's latest research focuses on the role of money in financial markets and on central bank collateral frameworks which lie at the foundation of modern monetary and financial systems. He argues that "money matters" and quoting Walter Bagehot "money is economical power" states that "[t]he money at the core of modern economies is central bank money, what bankers call ‘liquidity’. Central banks inject money into the economy, using banks as intermediaries, against collateral. So, if money is economic power and money is issued against collateral, it is important to understand the nature of this collateral, and the terms of the exchange."

He shows that central banks' size and importance increased substantially in the last decade and if one wants to understand how financial systems work one has to look closely into what central banks are doing. Nyborg's broader agenda is to investigate the role of money in finance. Modern macroeconomics and finance often ignore money, it is rarely modeled explicitly in the theory of banking and finance. However, Nyborg argues that money and its architecture matter and are critical for understanding financial markets and the broader economy.

Taking the Eurozone as an example, Nyborg shows that the Eurosystem's collateral framework promotes illiquid and risky collateral and that it impairs market forces and discipline. In their place, we find rating agencies, government guarantees, and political forces. He argues that "[w]ell-functioning monetary and financial systems are important to the efficient flow of resources and private and social welfare. ... Widespread financial market interventions by central banks have made it difficult to gauge “correct” market prices... This undermines the efficient allocation of resources in the economy. Improving our understanding of the workings of the monetary and financial system is therefore of central, and also urgent, importance. ... Transparency is also important vis-à-vis the public at large." ... Nyborg's work on collateral frameworks has opened up the workings of central banks and how they manage and control capital markets and the economy through their collateral policies.
