= Neftçi =

Neftçi may refer to:

== People ==
- Nermin Neftçi (1924–2003), Turkish lawyer, politician and former government minister.
- Salih Neftçi (1947–2009), Turkish financial economist.

== Other uses ==
- Neftçi PFK, an Azerbaijani football club.
- FC Neftchi Fergana, an Uzbekistani football club.
- FC Neftchi Kochkor-Ata, a Kyrgyz football club.
- Nebitçi FT, a Turkmen football club.
