= Norma Yaeger =

American businesswoman, stockbroker and author (1930–2026)

- Yeager in 1972
- Born: Naomi Hason; May 5, 1930; New York City, U.S.
- Died: June 3, 2026 (aged 96); Los Angeles, California, U.S.
- Occupations: Stockbroker, author, activist, businesswoman
- Years active: 1962–2026
- Spouse(s): Sam Nahmias (m. 1951, divorced) Lawrence Yaeger

Norma Hason Nahmias Yaeger (May 5, 1930 – June 3, 2026) was an American businesswoman, stockbroker and published author. In 1962, she became the first woman to enroll in Hornblower & Weeks, Inc.'s training program for stockbrokers. She is the first woman who demanded and got the right to join her male trainees on the floor of the New York Stock Exchange. The Stock Exchange did not previously allow women to set foot on its floor. Norma Nahmias was the only woman invited to Hornblower & Weeks' Management Advisory Board. She registered with the Liquidity Fund with the SEC; it was the first Money Market Mutual Fund in California. Norma Yaeger registered and opened a full-service stock brokerage firm, Yaeger Securities, Inc., in 1981.

When the Affirmative Action Bill AB-1933 passed in 1989, she started a second brokerage firm, Yaeger Capital Markets, which she opened in 1991. Her numerous licenses include the New York Stock Exchange (NYSE), the National Association of Security Dealers (NASD), the Chicago Board of Options, and the Commodity Exchange. She spent a lot of her time giving lectures to empower and encourage women. Breaking Down the Walls, the memoir of her years as a Wall Street and business pioneer is her first book, published in 2014.

== Early life and education ==
Norma Hason was born and raised in Brooklyn, New York City, and of Sephardic Jewish descent. In 1951, she married her high school sweetheart, Sam Nahmias, with whom she had three children. Her husband moved the family into a house in the Catskill Mountains of New York, and when her husband lost his job, they returned to New York. Norma needed to be the one working in their family. At that time, Norma started to imagine her life differently. She wanted to provide for her family and started to dream of a life where she could be financially independent of her spouse; she dreamed of becoming a stockbroker.

She studied at the City College of New York's Bernard Baruch College, and at the New York Institute of Finance.

== Career ==
In 1962, Norma Nahmias (married last name) became the first woman to enroll in Hornblower & Weeks, Inc.'s training program for stockbrokers. As a trainee, she demanded and got equal pay for equal work. She also requested and earned the right to join her male trainees on the New York Stock Exchange floor. Also, as a Registered Representative of Hornblower & Weeks, she was the only woman on their Management Advisory Board. After a divorce and her remarriage to Lawrence Yaeger, a general surgeon, she moved to Los Angeles, California. To further expand her career, she opened her own firm, Yaeger Securities, in 1981. She also registered the first Money Market Mutual Fund in California, The Liquidity Fund.

When the Affirmative Action Bill passed in 1989, she started a second brokerage firm, Yaeger Capital Markets, in 1991, to service government Pension Plans. Already at the time, her licenses included the New York Stock Exchange (NYSE), National Association of Security Dealers (NASD), Chicago Board of Options, and the Commodity Exchange.

With the sale of her brokerage firm in 1998, she retired and spent time traveling the world with her husband, Larry. She also gave lectures throughout the United States of America to share her advice with women on advancing their careers. Her first book, Breaking Down the Walls, a memoir, was published in 2014. She was honored with The United States Congress Award on her retirement. The award was presented to her by Rep. Loretta Sanchez on February 25, 1999.

== Personal life and death ==
Yaeger lived in California. She raised five children, three of her own and two of her husband's. Yaeger spent a lot of time with her children and grandchildren. She followed the stock market with much interest. Yaeger gave lectures to encourage and inspire women. She loved sports, especially skiing.

Yaeger died at a hospital in Los Angeles on June 3, 2026, at the age of 96.
