= Marco Pagano =

Italian economist and academic (born 1967)

Marco Pagano MAE

Academic background
- Education: University of Naples Federico II; University of Cambridge; Massachusetts Institute of Technology

Academic work
- Discipline: Financial economics
- Institutions: University of Naples Federico II
- Awards: Member of the Academia Europaea (2023); ERC Advanced Grant (2012); Commendatore of the Order of Merit of the Italian Republic (2007)
- Website: Information at IDEAS / RePEc

Marco Pagano is an Italian financial economist and professor of finance at the University of Naples Federico II, where he directs the Centre for Studies in Economics and Finance (CSEF). His research concerns market microstructure, corporate finance and governance, banking and financial regulation, and the relationship between finance and labour. He served as president of the Einaudi Institute for Economics and Finance from 2011 to 2019 and as managing editor of the Review of Finance from 2003 to 2011. In 2012, he received a European Research Council Advanced Grant, and in 2023 he was elected to the Academia Europaea.

Pagano's work has examined the determinants of market liquidity and price volatility, firms' decisions to go public, information sharing between lenders, the political economy of corporate governance, the sovereign–bank nexus in the euro area, and risk sharing between firms and employees. He co-authored Market Liquidity: Theory, Evidence, and Policy, first published in 2013 and issued in a second edition in 2023.

== Education ==
Pagano received a law degree from the University of Naples Federico II in 1978. He studied for a Bachelor of Arts degree in economics at Wolfson College, Cambridge, graduating in 1981, and completed a PhD in economics at the Massachusetts Institute of Technology in 1986.

== Academic career ==
Pagano joined the University of Naples Federico II as an assistant professor in 1985 and became an associate professor in 1988. He was an associate professor at Bocconi University from 1992 to 1995, returned to Naples for the 1995–1996 academic year, and was a full professor at the University of Salerno from 1996 to 2003. He subsequently returned to the University of Naples Federico II as a full professor. In 2011–2012, he was also a part-time professor at Imperial College Business School.

At Naples, Pagano directed the Centre for Studies in Economics and Finance from 2013 to 2022 and returned to the directorship in 2025. He coordinated the university's PhD programme in economics from 2019 to 2025.

Pagano served as managing editor of the Review of Finance, alongside Josef Zechner, from 2003 to 2011. The journal is the official journal of the European Finance Association, They were the journal's first managing editors under its current title. and awards the annual Pagano and Zechner Prize for its best non-investments paper.

== Research ==
=== Market liquidity and security market design ===
Much of Pagano's research has focused on market microstructure. His early work analysed how participation and market size affect market liquidity and price volatility. His work on endogenous market thinness showed that low participation and high volatility can reinforce one another, trapping a stock market in a low-volume, high-risk equilibrium, while his research on fragmented markets examined why trading tends to concentrate in already liquid markets.

With Ailsa Röell, he compared auction and dealer markets and studied how market transparency affects trading costs when some traders possess private information. His later work in this area addressed liquidity in government-bond markets, disclosure, securitisation, and short-selling restrictions. Together with Thierry Foucault and Röell, he published Market Liquidity, a market microstructure textbook covering theory, empirical evidence, and policy.

=== Corporate finance, governance, and credit institutions ===
Pagano has studied why firms enter public equity markets and how listing and ownership structures affect monitoring, liquidity, and access to capital. With Fabio Panetta and Luigi Zingales, he conducted an empirical study of Italian firms' decisions to go public; with Röell, he developed a model of the trade-off between ownership concentration and dispersed public ownership. He also examined international cross-listings and the geography of equity trading.

A related strand of his work treats financial rules and corporate governance as outcomes of political conflict among investors, managers, and workers. Research with Paolo Volpin addressed the political determinants of shareholder protection and stock-market development, as well as the role of employees in corporate control.

In banking and credit markets, Pagano's research has focused on information sharing among lenders, borrower incentives, collateral, creditor rights, and judicial enforcement. His work with Tullio Jappelli analysed how credit registries can reduce adverse selection and discipline borrowers, while subsequent research examined communication among multiple lenders and the effect of court enforcement on the availability of credit.

=== Macroeconomics and financial development ===
Pagano's early macroeconomic research included work with Francesco Giavazzi on monetary-policy credibility and the effects of fiscal consolidation. Their study of the European Monetary System analysed how an exchange-rate commitment could constrain the policies of inflation-prone governments. Their research on Denmark and Ireland examined circumstances in which changes in expectations could offset the contractionary effects of fiscal consolidation.

With Jappelli, Pagano investigated how borrowing constraints affect consumption, saving, and economic growth. Their cross-country and theoretical work linked limited household access to credit with higher saving and capital accumulation.

=== Financial regulation and systemic risk ===
Following the global financial crisis and the euro-area sovereign-debt crisis, Pagano's research increasingly addressed financial regulation and systemic risk. His empirical work with Alessandro Beber found that bans on short selling reduced market liquidity and slowed price discovery while generally failing to support stock prices. Other work examined credit-rating failures, securitisation, and how bank holdings of sovereign debt transmit fiscal stress to lending and the wider economy.

Pagano also contributed to research and policy proposals concerning the euro area's financial architecture. Work with Sam Langfield examined whether Europe's reliance on bank financing increased systemic risk, while research with Markus Brunnermeier and others proposed European Safe Bonds (ESBies), created by pooling and tranching sovereign debt, as a means of weakening the sovereign–bank nexus. His more recent research has extended these interests to climate risk, bank lending, and proposals for a European climate bond.

=== Finance and labour ===
Since the 2000s, Pagano has developed a research programme on the interaction between finance and labour, supported from 2012 to 2018 by an ERC Advanced Grant. This work studies firms as providers of implicit insurance to employees and considers how financial development, leverage, bankruptcy rules, and corporate governance affect employment, wages, and careers.

Later studies in this programme addressed competition for managerial talent, career risk in asset management, meritocracy, job mismatch, and careers in family firms.

== Honours and awards ==
- 1997: BACOB European Prize for Economic and Financial Research, jointly with Ailsa Röell.
- 2002: Elected Fellow of the European Corporate Governance Institute.
- 2004: Elected Fellow of the European Economic Association.
- 2005: Egon Zehnder International Prize, Egon Zehnder.
- 2007: Appointed a Commendatore of the Order of Merit of the Italian Republic
- 2012: European Research Council Advanced Grant for the project Finance and Labor.
- 2022–2023: Engelbert Dockner Fellow at the Vienna University of Economics and Business.
- 2023: Wim Duisenberg Fellow at the European Central Bank; recipient of the Premio De Sanctis per le Scienze Economiche; elected a member of the Academia Europaea.
- 2024: Elected member of the Accademia Pontaniana
- 2025: Dean's Distinguished Visiting Fellow, Rice University Business School.

== Books ==
- Pagano, Marco (ed.) (2001). Defusing Default: Incentives and Institutions. Washington, D.C.: Johns Hopkins University Press.
- Biais, Bruno; Pagano, Marco (eds.) (2001). New Research in Financial Markets. Oxford: Oxford University Press.
- Biais, Bruno; Pagano, Marco (eds.) (2002). New Research in Corporate Finance and Banking. Oxford: Oxford University Press.
- Mayer, Colin; Micossi, Stefano; Onado, Marco; Pagano, Marco; Polo, Andrea (eds.) (2018). Finance and Investment: The European Case. Oxford: Oxford University Press.
- Pagano, Marco; Pandolfi, Lorenzo; Puopolo, Giovanni Walter (2020). Economia dei mercati finanziari. Bologna: Il Mulino.
- Foucault, Thierry; Pagano, Marco; Röell, Ailsa (2023). Market Liquidity: Theory, Evidence, and Policy (2nd ed.; first published 2013). Oxford: Oxford University Press.
