= Università della Svizzera italiana =

Public university in Canton Ticino, Switzerland

- Logo
- Motto: Libertà di creare, responsabilità nell'agire
- Type: Public research university
- Established: 21 October 1996
- Affiliations: SFI, EUA, swissuniversities
- Rector: Gabriele Balbi (interim); Claudio Bassetti (appointed, from 1 September 2026)
- Students: 4,749 (2025)
- Location: Lugano, Ticino, Switzerland
- Campus: Urban
- Colours: Black and white
- Website: www.usi.ch

The Università della Svizzera italiana (USI) is a public Swiss research university with its main campus in Lugano and further sites in Mendrisio and Bellinzona, in the Canton of Ticino, Switzerland. Established by cantonal law in 1995 and opened in 1996, it is the only public university in Switzerland in which Italian is an official language of instruction, alongside a broad range of programmes taught in English.

The university occupies a specific position within the Swiss higher-education system as the public university of Italian-speaking Switzerland. It has five faculties: Communication, Culture and Society; Economics; Informatics; Biomedical Sciences; and the Academy of Architecture. The faculties of Communication, Culture and Society, Economics, Informatics and Biomedical Sciences are based in Lugano, while the Academy of Architecture is located in Mendrisio. The Faculty of Theology of Lugano is affiliated with USI.

USI enrolled 4,749 students in 2025, from more than 100 countries. Approximately 60 percent of its student body comes from outside Switzerland, reflecting the university's strongly international profile.

The university is associated with a network of research institutes and centres, including the Institute for Research in Biomedicine and the Institute of Oncology Research in Bellinzona, the Dalle Molle Institute for Artificial Intelligence Research in Lugano, and the Institute of Finance, which is part of the Swiss Finance Institute.

From 1 July 2023 to 31 December 2025 the university was led by Rector Luisa Lambertini, previously professor at the École polytechnique fédérale de Lausanne. Following her resignation, Vice-Rector Gabriele Balbi was appointed interim rector from 1 January 2026. In May 2026, neurologist Claudio Bassetti was appointed rector, with his term scheduled to begin on 1 September 2026.

In 2024 USI was placed ninth worldwide in the Times Higher Education World's Best Small Universities ranking, dedicated to institutions with fewer than 5,000 students. In the QS World University Rankings by Subject 2024, the university was included in Economics & Econometrics, with indicators related to citation impact and academic reputation.

== History ==
=== Origins and early higher-education initiatives ===
The intellectual origins of higher education in the territory of present-day Ticino predate the creation of the modern Swiss federal state. Archival documentation preserved in the State Archives of Lucerne records that in 1588 a proposal was discussed for the establishment of a higher-education institution in Lugano. The initiative, initially associated with the Somaschi Fathers and later connected with the Society of Jesus, formed part of the wider Catholic educational expansion that followed the Council of Trent. Across the Alpine and pre-Alpine regions, the post-Tridentine Church promoted philosophical and theological education as an instrument of institutional renewal and clerical formation.

The proposed Lugano institution was conceived as a college devoted to advanced instruction in philosophy and theology, designed to serve both ecclesiastical education and the broader cultural consolidation of Catholic territories within the loosely structured Old Swiss Confederacy. Political fragmentation among the cantons, financial limitations, and the complex administrative status of the Italian bailiwicks prevented its realization.

No sustained university project emerged during the early modern period. Ticino's administrative dependence on sovereign cantons and the proximity of established academic centres such as the University of Pavia and institutions in Milan reduced both the urgency and the feasibility of founding an autonomous university.

The issue reappeared in the 19th century within the broader context of liberal reform and state-building. In 1844 the Grand Council of Ticino approved a project for the establishment of a cantonal academy, developed by the statesman and educational reformer Stefano Franscini, who later became a member of the Swiss Federal Council. Franscini's proposal sought to create an advanced educational centre capable of meeting the administrative, cultural and professional needs of the canton while integrating into the federal framework.

Financial constraints and political rivalries among Locarno, Bellinzona and Lugano prevented implementation. Nevertheless, the 1844 vote represented the first formally approved cantonal initiative toward higher education.

Throughout the 20th century, proposals periodically resurfaced, including projects for a Higher School of Italian Culture, a Higher School of Italian Switzerland with a technical orientation, and an Institute of Culture of Italian Switzerland devoted to historical and linguistic research. Although none progressed beyond the planning stage, these recurring debates gradually consolidated the idea that a university represented a strategic necessity for Italian-speaking Switzerland within the multilingual Swiss Confederation.

=== The CUSI project and the 1986 referendum ===
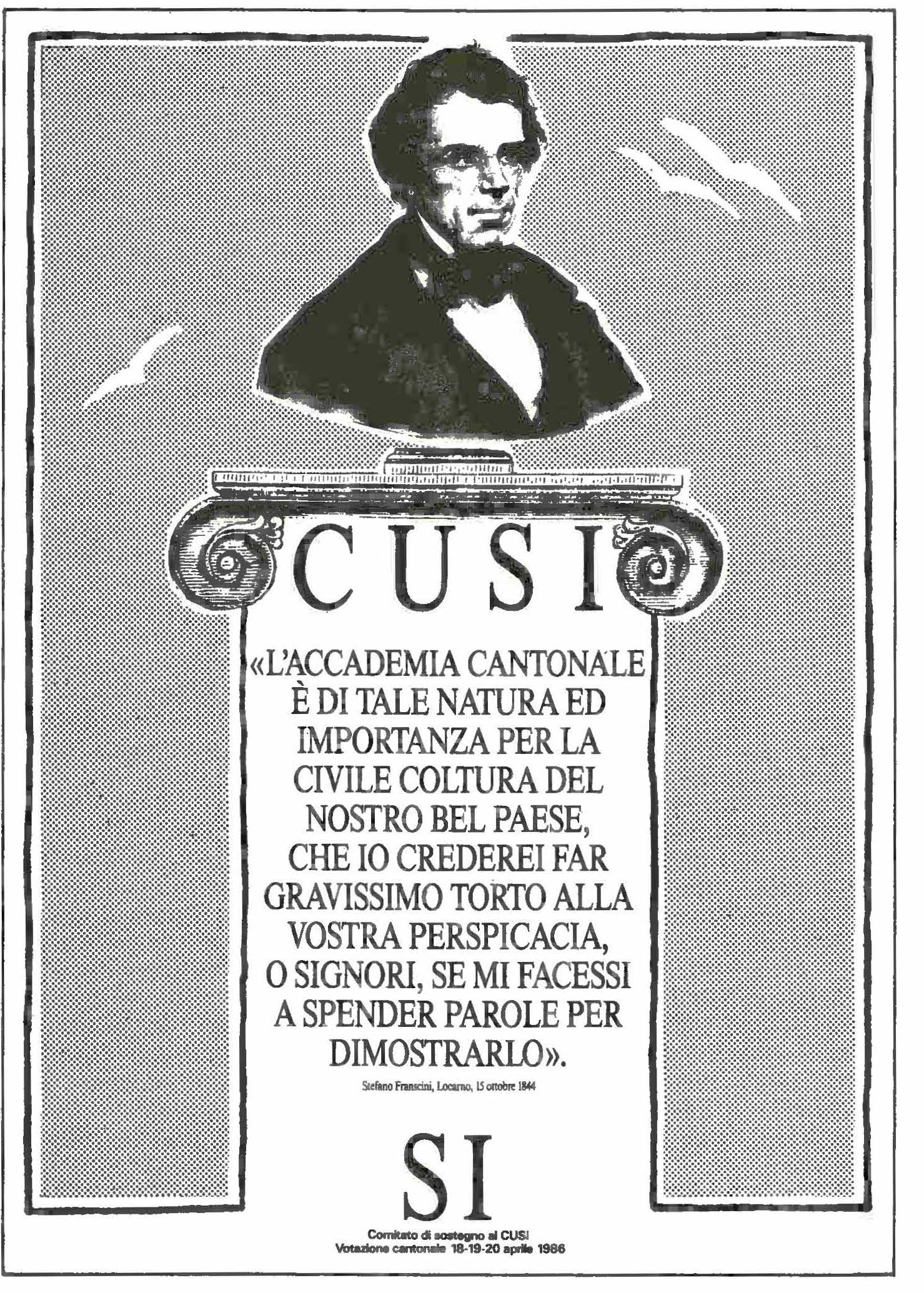
Campaign poster supporting the cantonal referendum on CUSI, 1986.

In the 1970s the debate took institutional form through the project known as the Centro Universitario della Svizzera Italiana (CUSI). Conceived primarily as a postgraduate and research-oriented centre, CUSI aimed to develop regional sciences, humanities, interdisciplinary programmes and continuing education for administrative and professional cadres, in line with the social, linguistic and economic profile of Ticino.

The project was approved by the Grand Council of Ticino on 11 December 1985. For the first time, the canton formally committed itself to establishing a higher-education institution, although the proposed structure was conceived as complementary to existing Swiss universities rather than as a complete university from the outset.

Opposition quickly emerged. A referendum committee led by Augusto Bolla and Giovanni Maria Staffieri collected the required signatures to submit the law to a popular vote. On 20 April 1986, with a turnout of 41.5 percent, voters rejected the proposal by 47,011 votes against 21,512 in favour.

Although the referendum halted the CUSI project, it clarified structural concerns regarding financial sustainability, institutional identity and the territorial balance of a future university. The episode became formative in shaping subsequent proposals for a full university in Italian-speaking Switzerland.

=== Federal and cantonal initiatives in the 1990s ===
In the early 1990s the university project re-emerged within national discussions concerning multilingualism and regional representation. In May 1990 a group of scholars and professionals published a manifesto in Libera Stampa advocating the creation of a university in Italian-speaking Switzerland.

On 27 October 1990 Federal Councillor Flavio Cotti publicly endorsed the initiative in a speech in Poschiavo, linking the proposal to Switzerland's constitutional multilingualism and to balanced linguistic representation in higher education.

In this context the Council of State of Ticino appointed the architect and planner Pier Giorgio Gerosa to draft strategic studies between 1991 and 1993. His reports outlined a multi-faculty university integrated into the Swiss academic system and oriented toward fields consistent with the cultural, economic and professional needs of the canton.

In parallel, the ETH Board commissioned architect Mario Botta to develop a proposal for a national academy of architecture. Although the project was not adopted at federal level, it gained support in Ticino and evolved into the Accademia di Architettura di Mendrisio, promoted with the support of cantonal and municipal authorities, including State Councillor Giuseppe Buffi and the mayor of Mendrisio, Carlo Croci.

In 1993 the Municipality of Lugano, led by mayor Giorgio Giudici, commissioned Mauro Baranzini, Sergio Cigada and Lanfranco Senn to design two faculties in economics and communication sciences. Luigi Dadda and Remigio Ratti joined the group in 1995, strengthening the academic and institutional structure of the proposal.

The foundation of the Università della Svizzera italiana resulted from the convergence of two distinct initiatives: the Mendrisio project for an academy of architecture and the Lugano project for faculties in economics and communication sciences. This convergence allowed the canton to present a unified institutional model, distributed between Lugano and Mendrisio and integrated into the Swiss higher-education system.

=== Establishment and opening in 1996 ===
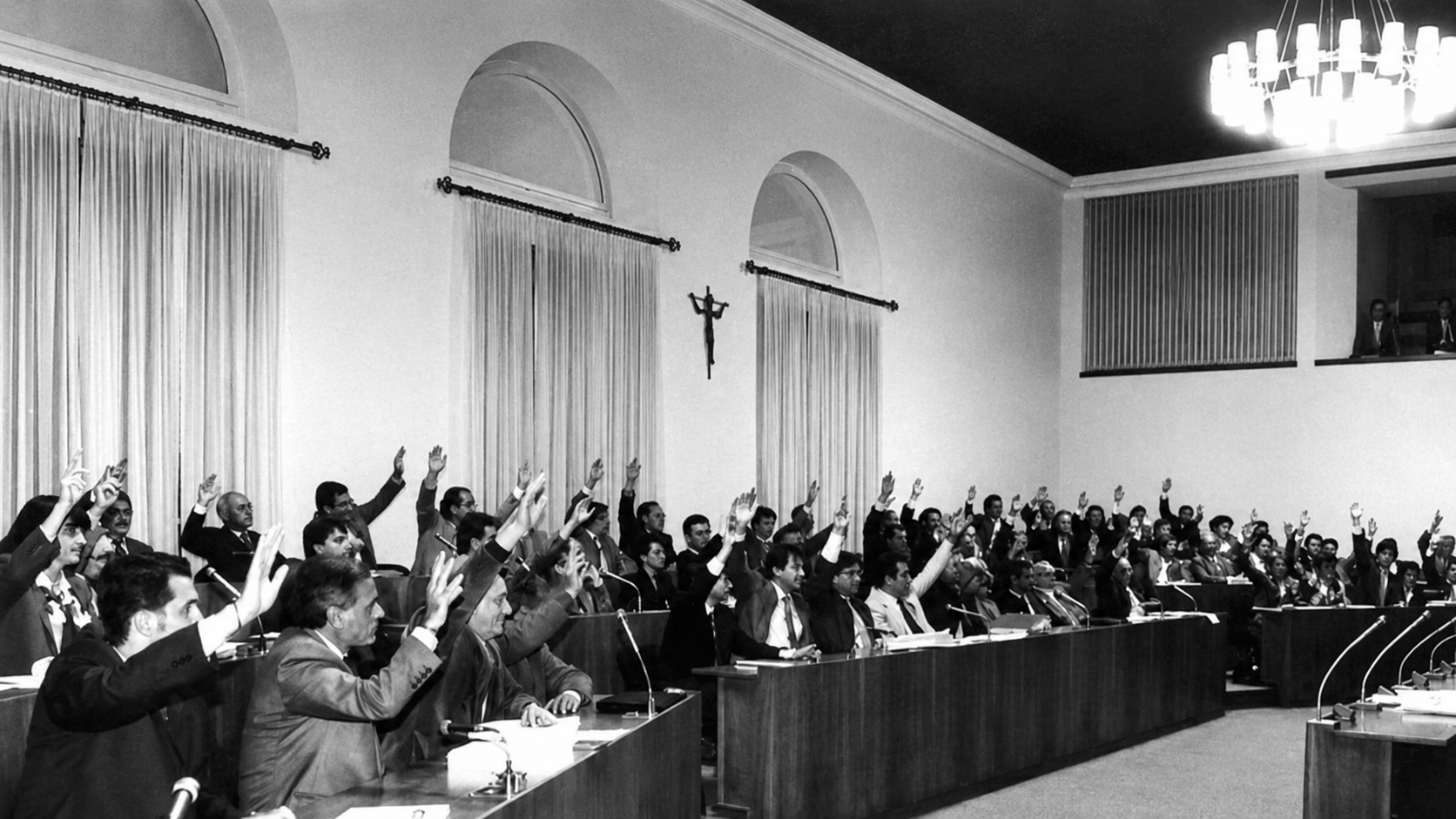
Vote on the establishment of the Università della Svizzera italiana in the Grand Council of Ticino, 1995.

In March 1995 the Municipal Council of Lugano approved the project for the creation of the faculties of Economics and Communication Sciences. In October 1995 the Grand Council of Ticino adopted the law establishing the Università della Svizzera italiana as a public cantonal university.

The institution was structured around three founding components: the Faculty of Economics, the Faculty of Communication Sciences and the Accademia di architettura di Mendrisio. The Swiss Science Council expressed a favourable opinion in autumn 1996, enabling the university to commence teaching.

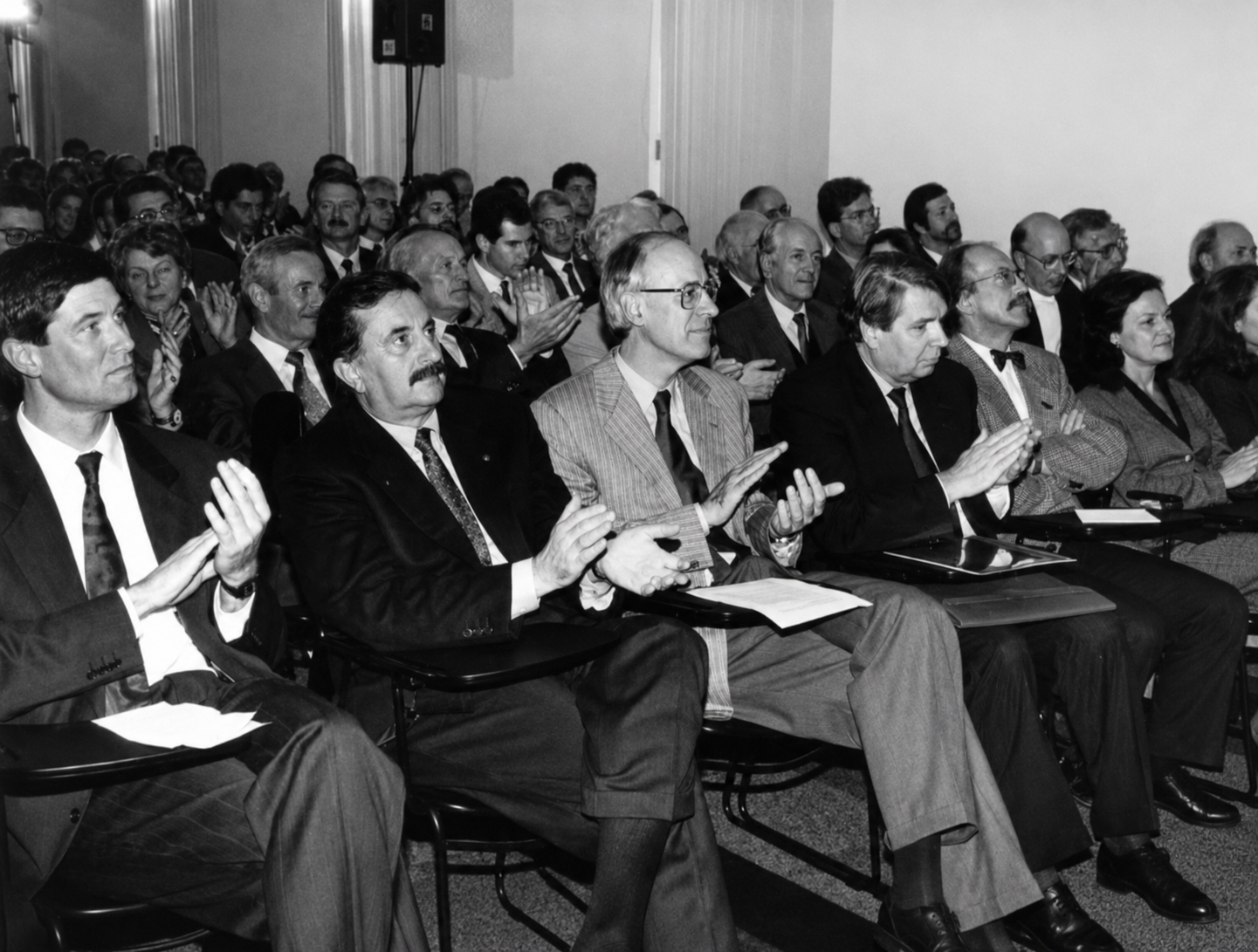
Opening ceremony of the Università della Svizzera italiana in Lugano, 21 October 1996.

USI officially opened on 21 October 1996. Marco Baggiolini became its first president, while Mauro Dell'Ambrogio was appointed secretary general. The opening marked the effective beginning of university teaching in Italian-speaking Switzerland and the institutional integration of the new university into the national higher-education framework.

The first Lugano campus was established in the former Ospedale Civico area in Via Giuseppe Buffi, in the Molino Nuovo district. The hospital complex had been inaugurated in 1909 and served for much of the 20th century as the main civic hospital of Lugano. After the transfer of hospital activities to the new Civic Hospital on Ricordone Hill in 1980, the former hospital site became available for public reuse and was progressively adapted to academic functions during the establishment of USI.

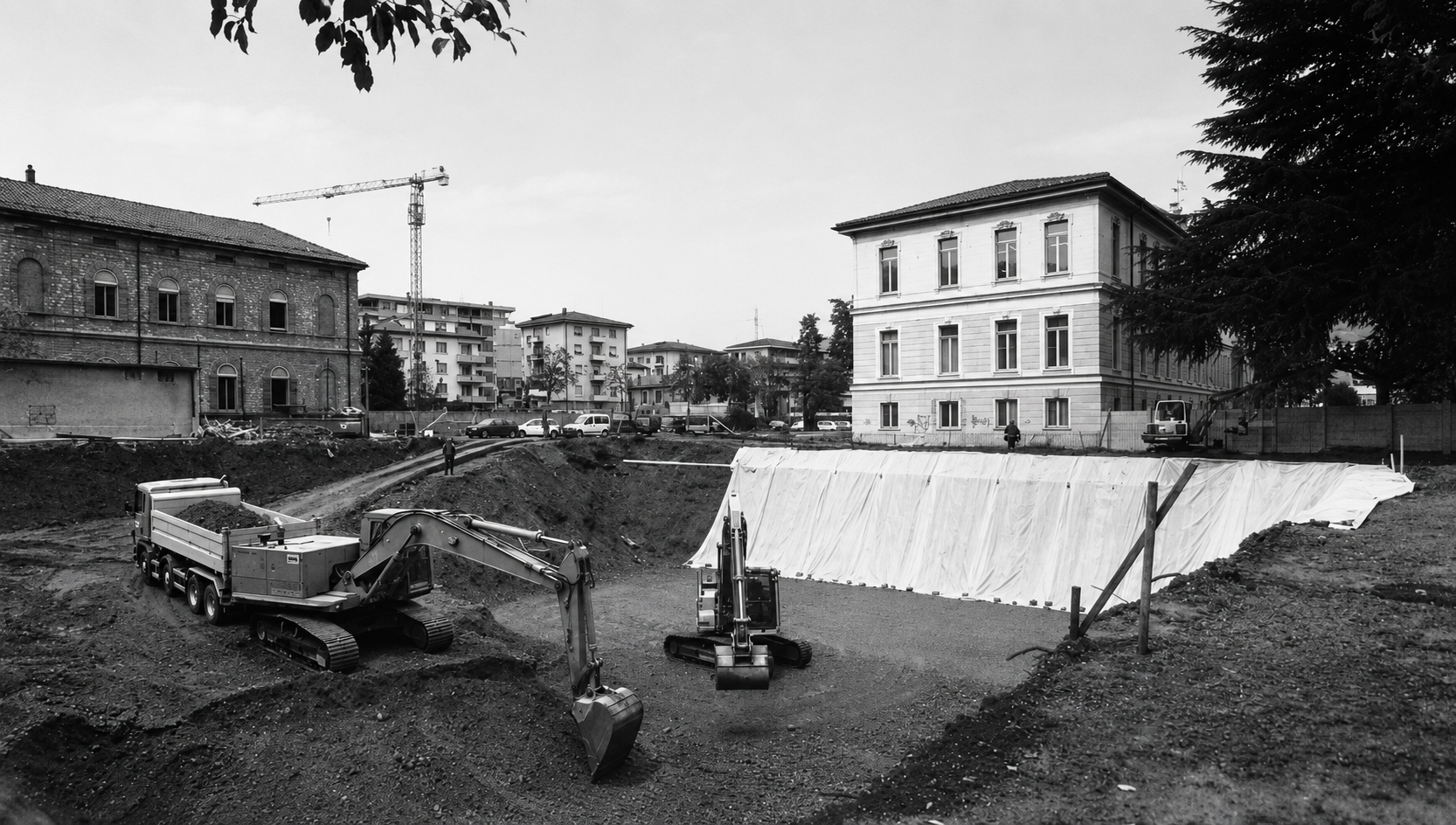
Redevelopment works at the former Civic Hospital site during the creation of the Lugano campus in the 1990s.

The reuse of the former hospital gave the new university an immediate urban presence and provided the institutional core of what later became the West Campus. Existing buildings were adapted for teaching, administration and student services, while subsequent works completed the transformation of the former hospital area into a university complex integrated into the surrounding city fabric.

In 2000 USI awarded its first degrees, and the Swiss Federal Council recognized Ticino as a university canton, integrating the institution fully into the Swiss higher-education system. In 2001 USI became the first Swiss university to align its curricula with the principles of the Bologna Declaration, introducing the three-cycle structure ahead of most other Swiss institutions.

=== Academic and scientific consolidation ===
In 1999 the Faculty of Economics established the Institute of Finance, strengthening USI's research profile in financial economics and connecting the university to the Swiss financial and academic environment. The institute later became part of the Swiss Finance Institute, the national network for research and advanced training in finance.

In 2004 USI created the Faculty of Informatics, expanding the university beyond its original fields of economics, communication and architecture. The new faculty established a centre for computer science in Italian-speaking Switzerland and reinforced the university's activity in information technology, software systems, computational science and artificial intelligence.

In 2010 the Institute for Research in Biomedicine in Bellinzona became affiliated with USI, adding a stable biomedical research component to the university. The affiliation connected the university with an international research institute active in immunology and prepared the development of university-level medical and biomedical education in Ticino.

In 2014 USI established the Faculty of Biomedical Sciences. The new faculty coordinated medical education, biomedical research and collaborations with hospitals and scientific institutes in Ticino and elsewhere in Switzerland, broadening the university's disciplinary profile into medicine and the life sciences.

=== Governance, new campuses and recent rectors ===
In 2015 the University Council approved a governance reform introducing a rectorate model and establishing an Academic Senate. The reform clarified the distinction between strategic oversight, academic leadership and representative academic bodies, bringing the university's governance closer to the organisational models of other Swiss and European universities.

In 2016 mathematician Boas Erez was appointed rector. During his mandate, the university continued to consolidate its academic profile, international recruitment and internal governance. In December 2016 the Academic Senate formally began its activity, completing the implementation of the governance reform.

On 22 March 2021 the East Campus in Lugano was inaugurated in cooperation with the University of Applied Sciences and Arts of Southern Switzerland (SUPSI). Built in the Viganello district on a former industrial site, the campus created a shared academic complex for informatics, biomedical sciences, applied technologies and artificial intelligence, and represented the most significant infrastructural expansion of USI since its foundation.

In 2022 the University Council appointed economist Luisa Lambertini as rector. She took office on 1 July 2023 and became the first woman to lead the university. On 5 December 2025 USI announced her resignation from the rectorship and from her academic position, effective 31 December 2025. Vice-Rector Gabriele Balbi was appointed interim rector from 1 January 2026.

In May 2026 the USI Council appointed neurologist Claudio Bassetti as rector, with his term scheduled to begin on 1 September 2026. Bassetti, born in Bellinzona, had been professor of neurology at the University of Bern, director of the Department of Neurology at the Inselspital and dean of the university's Faculty of Medicine.

=== International development and rankings ===
Since the 2000s USI has progressively strengthened its international profile through the early adoption of the Bologna system, the expansion of English-language programmes, participation in European research networks and the international composition of its student body. Approximately 60 percent of its students come from outside Switzerland, giving the university a strongly international character within the Swiss academic system.

In 2020 USI entered the QS World University Rankings, appearing among the youngest European institutions evaluated globally. In the 2022 edition the university reached 240th position worldwide.

In 2024 Times Higher Education ranked USI ninth globally among universities with fewer than 5,000 students. In the QS World University Rankings by Subject 2024, USI was included in Economics & Econometrics, with indicators related to citation impact and academic reputation.

USI participates in European research frameworks including Horizon 2020 and Horizon Europe, collaborating with universities and research centres in Europe, North America and Asia. Its development in economics and finance, communication sciences, informatics, architecture and biomedical research has contributed to its position as a small public research university with a pronounced international profile.

== Locations and buildings ==
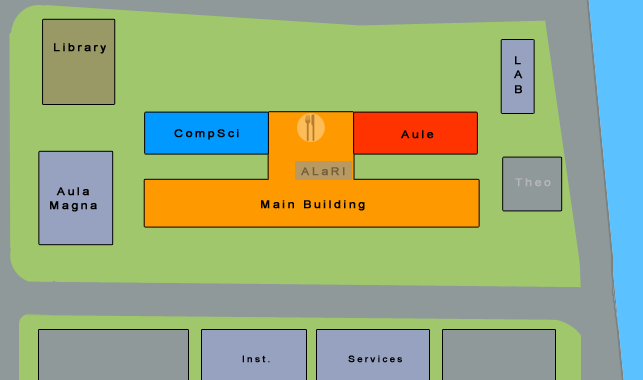
Campus map of the Lugano campus.

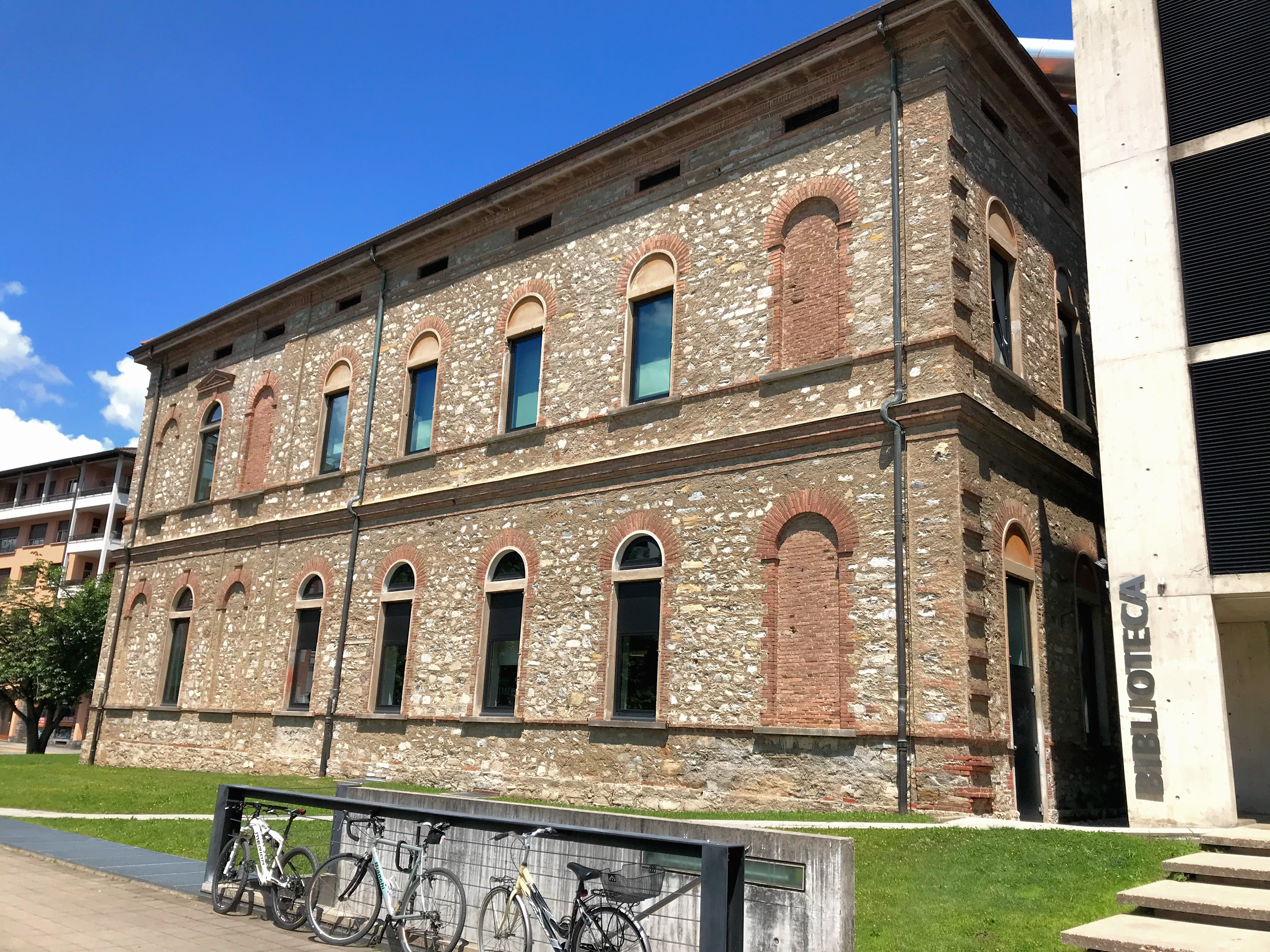
University Library in Lugano.

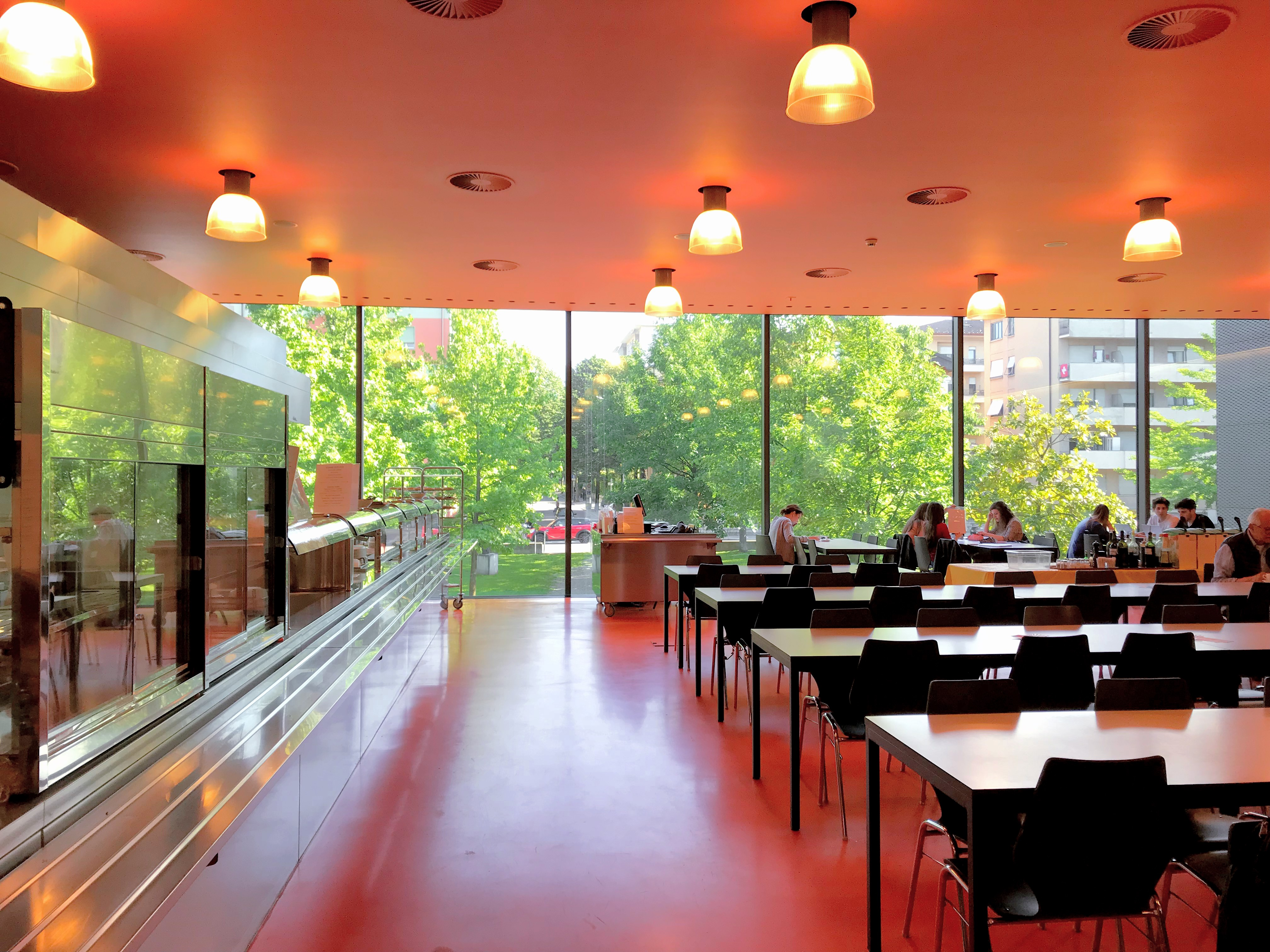
Cafeteria within the Lugano West Campus.

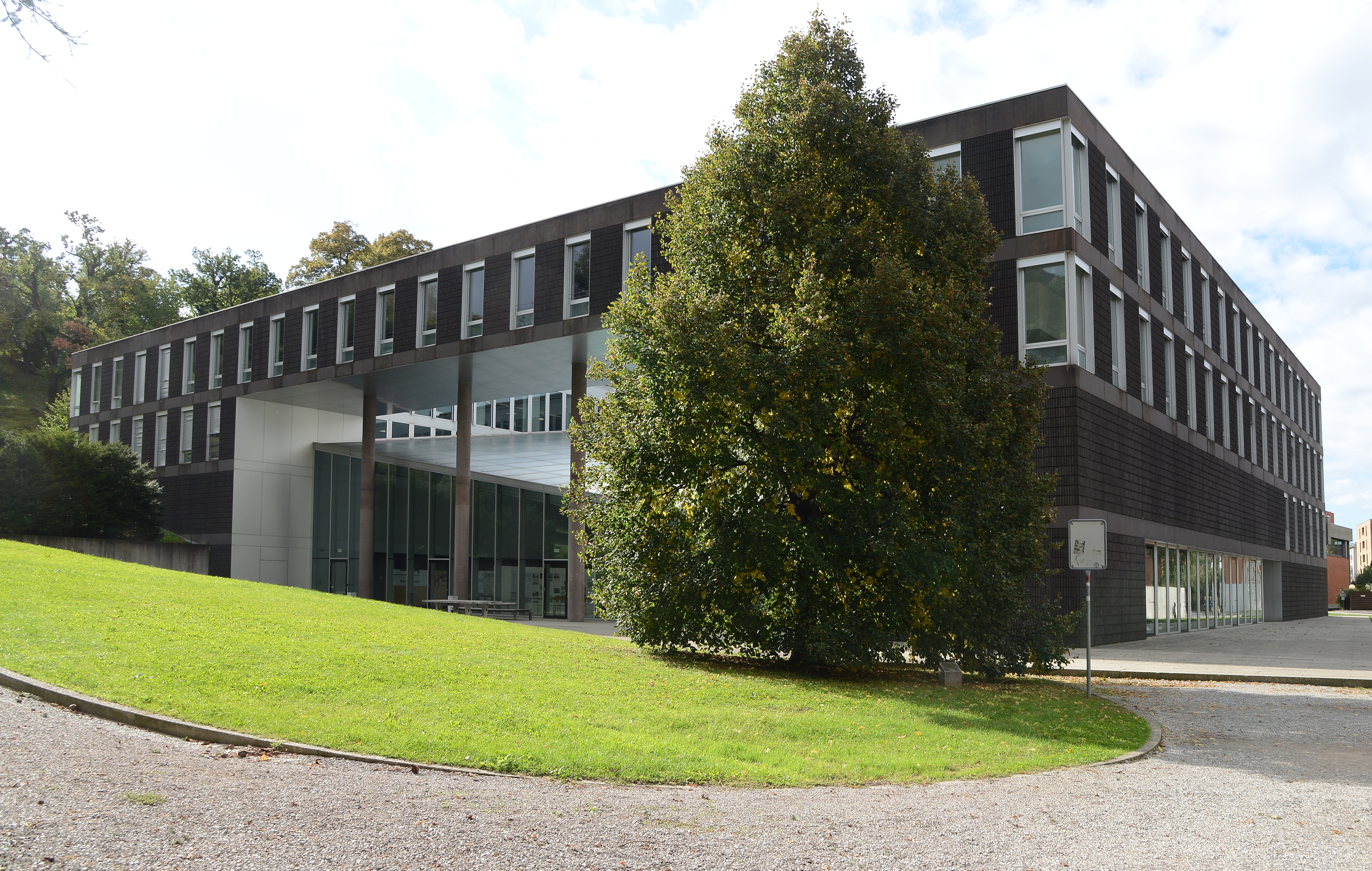
Palazzo Canavée, one of the buildings of the Academy of Architecture in Mendrisio.

The Università della Svizzera italiana is organised as a multi-site urban university within the Canton of Ticino, with its principal campuses in Lugano and Mendrisio and a research presence in Bellinzona. Its physical development reflects the institutional history of the university: the Lugano campus originated from the adaptation of an existing civic and hospital complex, the Mendrisio campus was formed within the historic urban fabric of the town, and the Bellinzona presence developed around biomedical research institutes affiliated with the university.

Unlike collegiate or enclosed campus universities, USI developed through the integration of academic functions into existing urban contexts. The result is a dispersed but compact institutional structure, in which teaching, research, administration, libraries, student services and affiliated institutes are distributed across sites linked by the cantonal transport network.

=== Lugano West Campus ===
The historic and administrative core of the university is the Lugano West Campus, located at Via Giuseppe Buffi 13 in the Molino Nuovo district. The site was created through the conversion and adaptation of the former Ospedale Civico area in the mid-1990s, at the time of the establishment of the university.

The former hospital complex had been inaugurated in 1909 and functioned for much of the twentieth century as the main civic hospital of Lugano. After the transfer of hospital activities to the new Civic Hospital on Ricordone Hill in 1980, the buildings became available for new public uses. Their subsequent conversion into a university campus gave the newly founded USI an immediate institutional presence within the urban fabric of Lugano.

Existing hospital buildings were progressively renovated and adapted for academic purposes, allowing the first teaching, administrative and service functions of the university to be installed. The West Campus hosts the Rectorate, central administrative offices, lecture halls, seminar rooms, student services, the university cafeteria and study areas. It accommodates the Faculty of Economics and the Faculty of Communication, Culture and Society, as well as part of the Faculty of Informatics.

The development of the West Campus also included the construction of new university buildings within the park of the former civic complex. These included the Aula magna, the library, teaching spaces, computer laboratories and facilities connected with the affiliated Faculty of Theology. The park functions as an ordering element within the campus, linking the renovated historical structures and the newer academic buildings while maintaining a relationship with the surrounding city.

The Aula magna, designed by Könz Architetto with Aurelio Galfetti, was conceived as a public and academic meeting space. In order to preserve the continuity of the park, the main hall was placed partly below ground level; its paved roof forms a tree-lined public surface, while the interior maintains visual connections with the surrounding green space.

The University Library in Lugano is the main bibliographic infrastructure for the faculties based in the city. Its collections focus on economics, social sciences, communication studies, informatics and related disciplines. The library provides access to printed holdings, scientific journals, electronic databases and national cataloguing systems within the Swiss academic library network.

The Faculty of Theology of Lugano, an institution affiliated with USI, is also located on the Lugano campus.

=== Lugano East Campus ===
The Lugano East Campus, inaugurated in March 2021, is located in the district of Viganello, on the former Campari industrial site on the left bank of the Cassarate. The complex lies near the West Campus and at the edge of the Molino Nuovo, Viganello and Pregassona urban areas.

The project, known during the competition phase as Zenobia, was selected through an international architectural competition held between October 2010 and July 2011 and was designed by Simone Tocchetti and Luca Pessina. It transformed a former industrial area into a shared university campus for USI and the University of Applied Sciences and Arts of Southern Switzerland (SUPSI).

The campus is organised around a central courtyard and a system of porticoes connecting teaching spaces, laboratories, common areas, a multipurpose hall, a cafeteria, exhibition areas and services for the academic community. It hosts the Faculty of Informatics, part of the Faculty of Biomedical Sciences, the Department of Innovative Technologies of SUPSI and the Dalle Molle Institute for Artificial Intelligence Research (IDSIA), a joint institute of USI and SUPSI.

The East Campus is also part of the wider urban transformation of the Cassarate and Viganello area. Its construction strengthened the relationship between academic functions, public space and new neighbourhood centralities. The project was built between 2017 and 2021, with a Minergie energy standard and an energy reference area of 27,130 square metres.

=== Mendrisio campus ===
The Mendrisio campus hosts the Accademia di Architettura di Mendrisio, USI's Faculty of Architecture. Founded in 1996 as one of the university's original components, the Academy constitutes the university's centre for architectural education and research.

The Academy operates within a distributed campus integrated into the historic centre of Mendrisio. Its buildings include restored historical structures associated with the former Servite convent, adapted for academic use. This arrangement creates a campus embedded in the existing town rather than separated from it, with teaching, design studios and cultural spaces distributed through the urban fabric.

The complex includes design studios, lecture halls, modelling laboratories, exhibition spaces and research facilities. The Academy also maintains a specialised library focused on architecture, urbanism, art history, theory of design and restoration, operating in coordination with the university library system.

A student residence known as Casa dell'Accademia provides accommodation for approximately 72 students and serves primarily the Academy community.

=== Bellinzona research sites ===
In Bellinzona, USI is connected to major biomedical research institutions, including the Institute for Research in Biomedicine and the Institute of Oncology Research, both affiliated with the university.

These institutes operate within dedicated research facilities and contribute to USI's activities in life sciences, biomedical research, oncology and doctoral education. Their location in the cantonal capital places them close to other public institutions and to the biomedical research and hospital network of Ticino.

=== Main sites ===
USI's institutional presence is articulated across several principal sites:

- Lugano - West Campus, Via Giuseppe Buffi 13
- Lugano - East Campus, Via la Santa 1
- Mendrisio - Academy of Architecture campus
- Bellinzona - affiliated biomedical and oncology research institutes

The West Campus functions as the historical and administrative core of the university. The East Campus represents its most recent urban and infrastructural expansion. Mendrisio constitutes the architectural and design-oriented pole of the institution, while Bellinzona anchors its biomedical research network within the cantonal capital.

== Organisation and administration ==
The Università della Svizzera italiana (USI) is a public cantonal university of the Canton of Ticino and forms part of the coordinated Swiss higher-education system. It operates under cantonal legislation and within the framework of federal recognition and coordination mechanisms for Swiss higher education. At national level, the university is represented through swissuniversities, the conference of rectors of Swiss higher-education institutions.

Unlike collegiate universities, USI is organised as a unified institution structured around faculties, central governance bodies and affiliated or associated research institutes. Its academic organisation reflects the university's origins as a multi-site institution, with faculties in Lugano and Mendrisio and a biomedical research presence in Bellinzona.

=== Faculties ===
USI is organised into five faculties:

- Faculty of Economics
- Faculty of Communication, Culture and Society
- Faculty of Informatics
- Faculty of Biomedical Sciences
- Academy of Architecture

The Faculty of Economics, based in Lugano, provides teaching and research in economics, management, finance and public policy. Its Institute of Finance, founded in 1999, is part of the Swiss Finance Institute, the national network for research and advanced training in financial economics.

The Faculty of Communication, Culture and Society is based in Lugano and brings together communication sciences, media studies, humanities, philosophy and social sciences. It developed from one of the university's founding faculties and reflects USI's original orientation toward communication, culture and the social sciences in the Italian-speaking part of Switzerland.

The Faculty of Informatics was established in 2004 and offers teaching and research in computer science, software systems, artificial intelligence, computational science and related fields. It collaborates closely with the Dalle Molle Institute for Artificial Intelligence Research (IDSIA), a joint research institute of USI and the University of Applied Sciences and Arts of Southern Switzerland (SUPSI).

The Faculty of Biomedical Sciences was established in 2014 and coordinates USI's activities in medical education, biomedical research and life sciences. It maintains links with Swiss universities, hospitals and research institutes, including affiliated institutes in Bellinzona such as the Institute for Research in Biomedicine and the Institute of Oncology Research.

The Accademia di Architettura di Mendrisio, founded in 1996, constitutes USI's Faculty of Architecture. It is based in Mendrisio and operates within a distributed campus integrated into the historic urban fabric of the town. The Academy was part of the university's original institutional structure and was promoted in connection with the project developed around Mario Botta for an architecture school in Ticino.

=== Affiliated faculty ===
The Faculty of Theology of Lugano is affiliated with USI. It is institutionally distinct from the five faculties of the university but is integrated into the academic framework of the institution. Its affiliation was announced in 2021 during the XXV Dies academicus of USI.

=== Governance ===
USI is governed through a central institutional framework composed of the University Council, the Rectorate and the Academic Senate. The University Council is the university's principal strategic and supervisory body, with responsibility for institutional development, senior appointments and financial oversight. The Rectorate functions as the executive authority of the university and is headed by the rector.

In 2015 the University Council approved a governance reform that transformed the previous presidential model into a rectorate model and introduced the Academic Senate. The reform clarified the distinction between strategic oversight, executive leadership and academic representation, bringing the university's institutional structure closer to the governance models used by other Swiss and European universities.

The Academic Senate represents the academic community and contributes to discussion and proposals concerning teaching, research and academic development. Faculty councils and faculty-level bodies operate within the individual faculties, supporting the organisation of teaching, research and internal academic life.

=== Rectors ===
Since its foundation, USI has been led by the following presidents and rectors:

- Marco Baggiolini, president, 1996-2006
- Piero Martinoli, president and later rector, 2006-2016
- Boas Erez, rector, 2016-2022
- Luisa Lambertini, rector, 2023-2025
- Gabriele Balbi, interim rector, 2026
- Claudio Bassetti, appointed rector in 2026

In May 2026 the USI Council appointed neurologist Claudio Bassetti as rector, with his term scheduled to begin on 1 September 2026.

=== Finance ===
As a public cantonal university, USI is financed through cantonal contributions, federal contributions within the Swiss higher-education system, tuition fees, competitive research grants and third-party funding. Research funding is obtained through national and international competitive schemes, including the Swiss National Science Foundation, European research programmes and project-based collaborations with public and private partners.

Financial governance is exercised within the institutional framework of the university and in accordance with cantonal rules applicable to public institutions. The University Council is responsible for strategic and financial supervision, while operational management is carried out through the Rectorate and central administrative services.

=== Affiliated and associated institutes ===
USI is connected to a network of institutes and research centres that extend its activity beyond the five faculties. These institutes contribute to the university's profile in biomedical sciences, oncology, artificial intelligence, computational science, finance, solar physics and applied research.

- Institute for Research in Biomedicine (Bellinzona)
- Institute of Oncology Research (Bellinzona)
- Dalle Molle Institute for Artificial Intelligence Research (IDSIA)
- Istituto ricerche solari Aldo e Cele Daccò (IRSOL)
- Institute of Finance, part of the Swiss Finance Institute
- UNESCO Chair in ICT to develop and promote sustainable tourism in World Heritage Sites

The Institute for Research in Biomedicine focuses on immunology and biomedical sciences and is affiliated with USI. The Institute of Oncology Research conducts basic and translational cancer research and is also affiliated with the university.

IDSIA, founded in 1988, is a joint institute of USI and SUPSI dedicated to artificial intelligence, machine learning, neural networks, robotics and intelligent systems. IRSOL, based near Locarno, is active in solar physics and is associated with USI in the field of natural sciences.

The university also hosts a UNESCO Chair in information and communication technologies for the development and promotion of sustainable tourism in World Heritage Sites.

=== Memberships and partnerships ===
USI is a member of swissuniversities and the European University Association. It is also linked to national research and academic networks through its participation in the Swiss Finance Institute, research collaborations with Swiss universities and hospitals, and joint institutes such as IDSIA with SUPSI.

== Academic profile ==
The academic profile of the Università della Svizzera italiana is shaped by its position within the Swiss public university system, its relatively small scale, its multilingual environment and its strong international orientation. Since its foundation, USI has combined teaching and research in selected disciplinary areas, with particular emphasis on economics and finance, communication sciences, informatics, architecture, biomedical sciences and, through affiliated institutions, theology and life sciences.

The university follows the structure of the Bologna Process, offering Bachelor, Master and doctoral programmes, as well as continuing education and executive programmes. Its teaching is delivered in Italian and English, depending on the discipline and level of study, reflecting both its role as the university of Italian-speaking Switzerland and its integration into international academic networks.

=== Admissions ===
Admission to USI follows the general framework governing public universities in Switzerland. Undergraduate admission normally requires the Swiss Matura or an equivalent recognised secondary qualification. International applicants are assessed on the basis of formally recognised credentials, with additional consideration of language proficiency and the academic requirements of the chosen programme.

Although Swiss public universities operate within a nationally regulated access framework, admission to specific USI programmes may include selective or qualitative procedures. This applies in particular to programmes at the Accademia di architettura di Mendrisio, where admission may involve portfolio assessment, and to selected Master and doctoral programmes, where academic performance, disciplinary preparation, motivation, research fit and the availability of places or supervision may be considered.

Graduate admission is determined at faculty level and requires a recognised undergraduate degree in a relevant field. Applications are evaluated on formal eligibility, previous academic performance and coherence with the objectives of the programme. Doctoral admission is based on academic qualifications, research potential and the approval of the competent faculty body, normally including the identification of an appropriate supervisor.

The international composition of the student body contributes to the selective character of many programmes. USI enrolls students from more than 100 countries, and approximately 60 percent of its students come from outside Switzerland, one of the highest proportions among Swiss universities.

==== Application process ====
Applications are submitted through the university's central admissions system and are assessed according to the requirements of the relevant faculty and degree programme. Evaluation combines verification of formal requirements with programme-specific academic assessment. For doctoral studies, admission requires approval by the relevant academic body and the definition of a research project within the faculty or institute concerned.

=== Teaching ===
USI offers Bachelor programmes in architecture, communication, economics, informatics, data science, Italian language and literature, medicine, philosophy and theology. The programmes reflect the university's disciplinary structure and its combination of professional, scientific and humanistic fields.

Teaching combines lectures, seminars, laboratories, project-based learning and research-oriented instruction. The Academy of Architecture follows a studio-based model, integrating architectural design with history, theory, construction, urban studies and visual culture.

Master programmes are offered in areas including architecture, economics, finance, management, communication, public policy, philosophy, informatics, artificial intelligence, computational science, data science, financial technology, health sciences and medicine. Several programmes are interdisciplinary or jointly organised across faculties, especially in fields such as computational finance, public policy, management, digital technologies and health sciences.

The linguistic profile of the university is one of its distinctive features. Italian remains the official language of the institution and of several programmes, while English is widely used at Master and doctoral level, particularly in economics, informatics, biomedical sciences and international programmes. This combination allows USI to serve the Italian-speaking region of Switzerland while attracting a student body and academic staff with an international profile.

=== Research ===
Research at USI is conducted within its faculties and through a network of institutes, centres and affiliated or associated research institutions. The main research areas include economics and finance, communication sciences, media studies, informatics, artificial intelligence, computational science, architecture, biomedical sciences, oncology, immunology and solar physics.

Doctoral education is a central component of the university's research system. Doctoral programmes are offered in the principal academic areas of the university, including architecture, communication, economics, finance, informatics, computational science, biomedical sciences, immunology, oncology, philosophy and theology.

USI collaborates with several research institutes, including the Dalle Molle Institute for Artificial Intelligence Research (IDSIA), the Institute for Research in Biomedicine (IRB) and the Institute of Oncology Research (IOR). These institutions contribute to the university's scientific profile in artificial intelligence, machine learning, biomedical research, immunology and cancer research.

The university participates in national funding schemes administered by the Swiss National Science Foundation and in European research frameworks, including Horizon 2020 and Horizon Europe. Researchers affiliated with USI and its institutes have obtained competitive grants from Swiss and European funding bodies, including grants of the European Research Council and equivalent Swiss transitional schemes.

According to the science-wide bibliometric database developed by John P. A. Ioannidis and collaborators and published in PLOS Biology, several researchers affiliated with USI and its institutes are included among the top 2 percent most cited scientists worldwide in their respective disciplines.

Since 2013, the university has hosted a UNESCO Chair in Information and Communication Technologies for the development and promotion of sustainable tourism in World Heritage Sites.

=== Innovation and entrepreneurship ===
The USI Startup Centre is the university's platform for innovation and entrepreneurship. It provides incubation, mentoring, training and networking services for students, researchers and external entrepreneurs, supporting the development of early-stage projects and the transfer of knowledge from academic research to economic and social applications.

In 2026 the USI Startup Centre was included in the Financial Times ranking "Europe's Leading Start-Up Hubs", developed in collaboration with Statista and Sifted. At its first inclusion, the centre appeared among 180 European hubs from 25 countries and was one of the Swiss university incubators represented in the ranking.

=== Libraries ===
The University Library in Lugano supports teaching and research in economics, communication sciences, informatics and related disciplines. Its collections include printed holdings, scientific journals, databases and electronic resources integrated into Swiss academic library networks.

The Academy of Architecture maintains a specialised library in Mendrisio focused on architecture, urbanism, art history, theory of design and restoration. Together, the Lugano and Mendrisio libraries support the university's teaching and research activity across its two principal academic sites.

=== Reputation and rankings ===
USI has progressively strengthened its international academic standing since its foundation. Its relatively small size, high proportion of international students and concentration in selected research areas have contributed to its profile among young and medium-sized European universities.

In 2020 USI entered the QS World University Rankings as one of the youngest European universities evaluated globally. In the 2022 edition of the ranking, it reached 240th position worldwide.

In 2024 Times Higher Education ranked USI 9th worldwide among universities with fewer than 5,000 students in its World's Best Small Universities ranking. The ranking is based on indicators related to teaching, research, international outlook and knowledge transfer, adjusted to the institutional category considered.

In the QS World University Rankings by Subject 2024, USI was included in Economics & Econometrics, with strong performance in indicators related to citation impact and academic reputation.

These results reflect the consolidation of USI's research profile in economics and finance, informatics, communication sciences, architecture and biomedical research, and its positioning as a compact, internationally oriented public university within the Swiss higher-education system.

== Student life ==
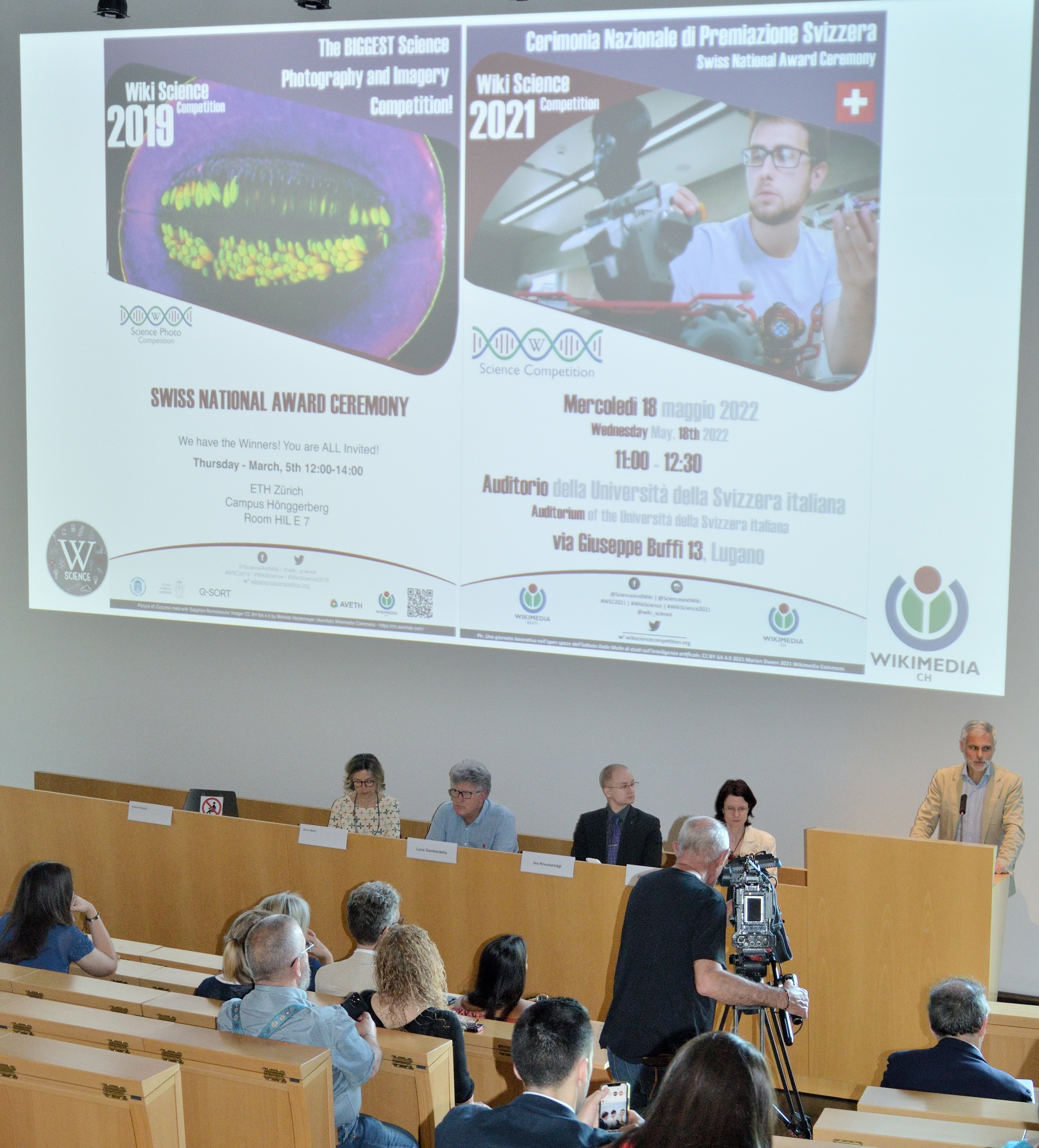
Award ceremony of the Wiki Science Competition 2021 in the West Campus auditorium of USI.

Student life at the Università della Svizzera italiana (USI) is shaped by the university's international composition, its urban and multi-site structure in Lugano, Mendrisio and Bellinzona, and its integration within the institutional and cultural context of the Canton of Ticino. Unlike collegiate universities, USI's student experience is organised primarily through faculties, research institutes, central student services, associations and cultural initiatives connected with the surrounding cities.

=== Events and cultural life ===
The main institutional ceremony of the university is the Dies academicus, held annually, usually in May. The event brings together the academic community, political authorities, representatives of the economy and civil society. During the ceremony, the Rector presents institutional data on teaching and research activities, academic honours are conferred and prizes are awarded to scholars and public figures who have contributed to scientific and cultural development. At the XXV Dies academicus in 2021, the affiliation of the Faculty of Theology of Lugano to USI was formally announced.

USI promotes conferences, public lectures, exhibitions, film screenings and cultural initiatives across its campuses, often in collaboration with institutions active in the cultural life of Ticino. The university has developed collaborations with organisations such as the Museo d'arte della Svizzera italiana (MASI) and participates in events and thematic forums connected with communication, architecture, economics, digital culture and the humanities.

In 2022 the university inaugurated the permanent USI Art Collection, comprising works by contemporary artists active in Switzerland and Europe and installed within university spaces. The collection forms part of a wider cultural programme intended to bring visual arts into the everyday environment of teaching, research and study.

The university also hosts disciplinary forums and public debates. Among the initiatives connected with its faculties are the Forum per la comunicazione e la cultura digitale, promoted by the Faculty of Communication, Culture and Society, and events organised by the Faculty of Economics in collaboration with institutions from the Swiss financial and economic sectors.

Since 2019 USI has promoted, together with the University of Applied Sciences and Arts of Southern Switzerland (SUPSI), the annual Sustainability Week. The initiative includes conferences, round tables, workshops and activities addressing environmental, economic and social sustainability, and forms part of broader university policies concerning sustainable development and social responsibility.

=== Student associations and media ===
Students are represented within university governance through elected representatives in faculty bodies and in the Academic Senate. Student participation contributes to discussion and decision-making in academic and organisational matters.

Several student associations operate across the university, promoting cultural, academic, social, professional and environmental initiatives. Among them are the Student Corporation, which supports associative activities and student media, and USI Students for Climate, active on sustainability-related issues.

In 2019 USI established the Student Media Center, which brings together student-run media initiatives including the web radio Radio Campus, the web television channel USI TV and the digital magazine L'Universo. These platforms are managed by students with the support of faculty and technical staff and provide a practical environment for communication, journalism and digital media activities.

=== Sport ===
Sports activities are coordinated by Sport USI-SUPSI, the joint sports service of USI and the University of Applied Sciences and Arts of Southern Switzerland. The service offers courses, recreational activities and internal competitions in disciplines such as football, basketball, volleyball, swimming, yoga and climbing.

USI students participate in inter-university tournaments in Switzerland and abroad. Since 2018 the university has taken part in the European Universities Games, a continental multi-sport event for university athletes.

=== Publications ===
USI curates an academic publication series known as Collana USI, produced in collaboration with Armando Dadò Editore of Locarno. The series includes research monographs, conference proceedings and scholarly works by faculty and researchers, contributing to the dissemination of scientific output and academic debate within Switzerland and internationally.

== Notable people ==
=== Alumni ===
- Shane Legg - artificial intelligence researcher, co-founder of Google DeepMind, and recipient of the first USI Alumni Award in 2024.
- Giacomo Brenna - architect, alumnus of the Accademia di architettura di Mendrisio, and recipient of the USI Alumni Award in 2025.

=== Faculty and researchers ===
- Marco Baggiolini - immunologist and founding president of USI.
- Mauro Baranzini - economist and member of the founding commission of USI.
- Mario Botta - architect and one of the founders of the Accademia di architettura di Mendrisio.
- Luigi Dadda - computer engineer, former Rector of the Polytechnic University of Milan, and member of the founding group of USI.
- Kenneth Frampton - architectural historian and critic; recipient of the Golden Lion for Lifetime Achievement at the Venice Biennale in 2018.
- Luca Maria Gambardella - computer scientist specialising in artificial intelligence, professor at USI and researcher at IDSIA.
- Antonio Lanzavecchia - immunologist, founder of the Institute for Research in Biomedicine, and recipient of the Louis-Jeantet Prize for Medicine in 2018.
- Michele Parrinello - physicist known for the Car-Parrinello molecular dynamics method and recipient of the Marcel Benoist Prize in 2011.
- Valerio Olgiati - architect and professor at the Accademia di architettura di Mendrisio since 2002.
- Jürgen Schmidhuber - artificial intelligence researcher known for work on neural networks and long short-term memory; professor at USI and researcher at IDSIA.
- Andrea Alimonti - oncologist and cancer researcher; recipient of the Cloëtta Prize in 2024.
- Peter Zumthor - architect, professor at the Accademia di architettura di Mendrisio from 1996, and recipient of the Pritzker Architecture Prize in 2009.

Faculty members and researchers associated with USI and its affiliated institutes have included figures active in architecture, artificial intelligence, philosophy, economics, computational science and biomedical research. The composition of this group reflects the university's development through specialised faculties and research institutes rather than through a traditional broad-based collegiate structure.

== See also ==
- Accademia di Architettura di Mendrisio
- University of Applied Sciences and Arts of Southern Switzerland
- Higher education in Switzerland
- List of largest universities by enrollment in Switzerland
- Swiss Federal Council
- Swiss National Science Foundation
- Swiss Finance Institute
