= Salih Neftçi =

Turkish economist (1947–2009)

- Born: Salih Nur Neftçi; 14 July 1947; Istanbul, Turkey
- Died: 15 April 2009 (aged 61); Aubonne, Switzerland
- Education: Middle East Technical University (BS); University of Minnesota (PhD)
- Known for: Introductory book on finance
- Scientific career
- Fields: Mathematical finance
- Workplaces: CUNY Graduate Center; The New School; Baruch College; Swiss Finance Institute; University of Lausanne; ICMA Centre; IMF; The World Bank; U.S. Department of State

Salih Nur Neftçi (14 July 1947 – 15 April 2009) was a leading expert in the fields of financial markets and financial engineering. He served many advisory roles in national and international financial institutions, and was an active researcher in the fields of finance and financial engineering. Neftçi was an avid and highly regarded educator in mathematical finance who was well known for a lucid and accessible approach towards the field.

== Background ==
Salih was born into a prominent wealthy Turkish family with ties to the oil business (neft is Arabic for oil). Until he was 11, he lived in Kirkuk, Iraq, but then moved to Istanbul. His mother, Nermin Neftçi was the vice chairman of Turkish parliament, and the first woman in Turkey to be so. His father moved along with the rest of the family to Turkey.

He received his B.S. in Economics from the Middle East Technical University and his Ph.D. in Economics from the University of Minnesota in 1977. His dissertation is titled "Three Essays in Business Cycle Research." Throughout his life, Salih maintained close links with U.S. academia and the Wall Street.

Neftçi was diagnosed with Gliosarcoma, a type of malignant brain cancer and died on 15 April 2009. In November 2009, the Salih Neftçi Memorial Scholarship Fund was endowed in perpetuity at Baruch College to help promote education and awareness of the financial engineering field of study.

== Teaching and research ==
Salih was one of the most productive researchers in financial engineering and taught in the areas of numerical methods of asset pricing, the mathematics of financial derivatives, emerging market asset trading strategies, and advanced risk management. Early in his career, Neftçi specialized in econometrics and macroeconomics. He produced classic papers on relationships among aggregate time series, especially wages and employment, over the business cycle, which appeared in the very best journals in economics and statistics, including Econometrica, the Journal of Political Economy, the Journal of the American Statistical Association, and the Review of Economics and Statistics. Starting in the late 1980s, he turned his attention to finance and produced seminal books on the mathematics of financial derivatives and the principles of financial engineering.

He arguably is best known for two particularly well-received textbooks on mathematical finance: An Introduction to the Mathematics of Pricing Financial Derivatives and Principles of Financial Engineering. These books have become standard texts in many financial engineering programs around the world. One of financial engineering's most eminent and visible practitioners and educators, Paul Wilmott, has written of An Introduction to the Mathematics of Financial Derivatives:

Neftçi (1996) is the only readable book on stochastic calculus for beginners. It does not assume any knowledge about anything. It takes the reader very slowly through the basics as applied to finance.

He taught at Boston College, George Washington University, and Fordham University before assuming a position in the Ph.D. Program in Economics at the CUNY Graduate CenterHomepage in 1982. He remained at that institution for the next 26 years. During part of that time, he also taught in the Financial Engineering Masters Program at Baruch College, which also is part of CUNY. In January 2008, Neftci left the Graduate Center for a position at the New School in New York. He had the foresight to encourage the New School to establish a program in global finance, which in his words “offers state-of-the art information resources and quantitative tools and techniques needed by the 21st century international financial profession.”

At the time of his death, he was Professor of Economics at the New School in New York City, Director of the Master of Arts Program in Global Political Economy and Finance at that university, Director of the Financial Engineering and Asset Management (FAME) Certificate Program at the Swiss Finance Institute and the University of Lausanne in Switzerland, a frequent lecturer in finance at the Hong Kong University of Science and Technology and at the International Capital Market Association Centre (ICMA) in the Business School for Financial Markets at the University of Reading in England, a consultant to the International Monetary Fund, the World Bank, the U.S. Department of State, and the Agency for International Development, and a newspaper columnist in Turkey and China. He held a seat on the Fitch Ratings Advisory Board from its inception in 2005.

== Selected publications ==
- An Introduction to the Mathematics of Financial Derivatives, Academic Press Advanced Finance, 2000 ISBN 0125153929
- Neftçi, Salih N. (2008). Principles of Financial Engineering (2nd ed.). Academic Press. ISBN 978-0-12-373574-4.
- China's Financial Markets: An Insider's Guide to How the Markets Work, Salih N. Neftci, Michelle Yuan Menager-Xu, 2006
