= Review of Finance =

Academic journal

- Discipline: Finance
- Language: English
- Edited by: Marcin Kacperczyk

Publication details
- History: 2003–present
- Publisher: Oxford University Press
- Frequency: Bimonthly
- Open access: Hybrid
- Impact factor: 5.059 (2021)

Standard abbreviations
- ISO 4: Rev. Finance

Indexing
- ISSN: 1572-3097 (print); 1573-692X (web)
- LCCN: 2009233399
- OCLC no.: 55661966

Links
- Journal homepage; Online archive; Journal page at association website

The Review of Finance is a bimonthly peer-reviewed academic journal covering all aspects of financial economics. It is published by Oxford University Press and is the official journal of the European Finance Association. The editor-in-chief is Marcin Kacperczyk (Imperial College London).

== History ==
The journal was established in 2003 with Marco Pagano and Josef Zechner as founding editors-in-chief.

=== Editors ===
The following persons are or have been editors-in-chief:

- Marcin Kacperczyk (Imperial College London; 2023–present)
- Alex Edmans (London Business School; 2017–2022)
- Franklin Allen (Imperial College London; 2012–May 2017)
- Josef Zechner (Vienna University of Economics and Business; 2003–2011)
- Marco Pagano (University of Naples Federico II; 2003–2011)

== Reception ==
The journal is in the top 50 on the list of academic journals in business compiled by the Financial Times. According to the Journal Citation Reports, it had a 2021 impact factor of 5.059.

== Abstracting and indexing ==
The journal is abstracted and indexed in:

- Current Contents/Social and Behavioral Sciences
- EBSCO databases
- EconLit
- ProQuest databases
- Scopus
- Social Sciences Citation Index
- zbMATH Open

== Awards ==
The journal awards two annual best paper prizes. The "IQAM Prize" is awarded to the best investments paper published in the journal over the past year, and the "Pagano and Zechner Prize" is awarded to the best non-investments paper. The journal also awards three Distinguished Referee Awards. The winners are announced at the European Finance Association conference in August as well as on its website.
