= Marco Baggiolini =

Swiss immunologist (born 1936)

Marco Baggiolini (born August 1, 1936) is a Swiss immunologist and biochemist known for the discovery and the analysis of the first chemokines (or chemotactic cytokines). Chemokines act as chemoattractants to guide the migration of cells. Some control cells of the immune system, some promote the growth of new blood vessels, some cause inflammation in response to bacterial infection and viruses, for example, to activate cells to initiate an immune response or promote wound healing.

Baggiolini's lab has produced highly cited publications on this topic.

== Education and career ==
Baggiolini was born on August 1, 1936, in Bellinzona. He studied medicine at the University of Basel, graduating in 1962. Then he worked as an assistant in biochemistry at the University of Bern (1963-1967) and as a research associate at Rockefeller University in New York (1967-1970) in the laboratory of Christian de Duve (Nobel Prize in 1974). He was an active researcher at the Sandoz Group in Basel from 1970 to 1983, where he served as deputy director of the Division of Pharmacology and Toxicology (1977-1979) and director of the Division of Research on Inflammation and Immunology (1979-1983). In 1983, he was appointed as director of the Theodor Kocher Institute at the University of Bern, where he inaugurated a new research program on inflammation. He received an honorary degree in medicine from the University of Ferrara. He was appointed as honorary member of the Swiss Academy of Medical Sciences and as member of the Academia Europaea. He was a member of the editorial boards of American and European scientific journals, as well as several scientific societies and scientific and cultural foundations. In 1996, he became the founding president of the Università della Svizzera Italiana (USI).

Baggiolini also directed Division IV of the Swiss National Science Foundation, responsible for the National Centers of Competence in Research and the National Programs. He was also co-director of the Swiss National Supercomputing Centre at ETH Zurich (CSCS).

== Awards ==
For his work he has received awards including the prize of the Society for Leukocyte Biology (1988), the Emil von Behring Prize (1998), and the Robert Koch Medal (2000).
