= Luisa Lambertini =

Italian international finance researcher

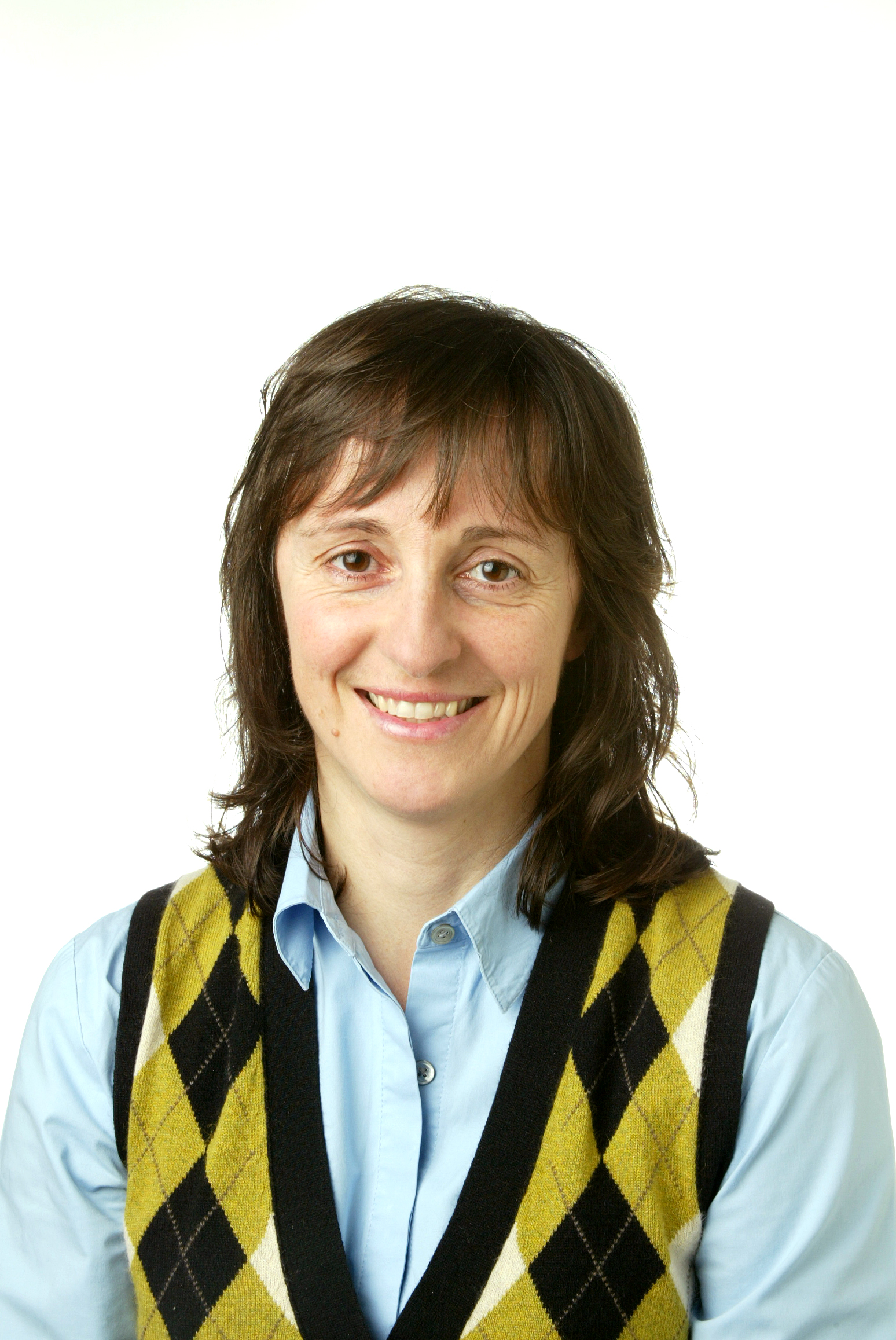
- Lambertini in 2007
- Born: 1963 (age 62–63); Bologna, Italy
- Citizenship: Italy
- Known for: Monetary-fiscal interaction Fiscal policy Macroprudential regulation

Academic background
- Education: Economics
- Alma mater: University of Bologna; University of Warwick; University of California, Berkeley
- Thesis: Theory and Evidence on the Accumulation of Large Public Debts (1995)
- Doctoral advisor: Maurice Moses Obstfeld

Academic work
- Discipline: Economics
- Sub-discipline: Monetary policy Fiscal policy
- Institutions: EPFL (École Polytechnique Fédérale de Lausanne)
- Main interests: Macroeconomics; International finance
- Website: https://www.epfl.ch/labs/cfi/

Luisa Lambertini (born 1963 in Bologna, Italy) is an Italian economist specializing in monetary and fiscal policy. She holds the Chair of International Finance at the College of Management of Technology of the École Polytechnique Fédérale de Lausanne (EPFL), where she has been a professor since 2009.

She has been the current Rector of the Università della Svizzera italiana (USI) between 1 July 2023, when she officially took office after being unanimously appointed by the University Council in October 2022, and 31 December 2025 when she resigned.

== Career ==
Lambertini studied economics at University of Bologna and earned her Laurea cum laude in 1987. At the University of Warwick she further researched studies in economics and gained a master's degree in 1989 for a thesis on the supervision of Marcus Miller. She then joined University of California, Berkeley as a doctoral student of Maurice Moses Obstfeld and graduated in with a PhD in economics in 1995 with a thesis titled: Theory and Evidence on the Accumulation of Large Public Debts.

In 1995, she joined the Department of Economics at University of California, Los Angeles as an assistant professor before going to work as an associate professor at Boston College's Department of Economics in 2003. In 2005, she moved to the Department of Economics at Claremont McKenna College as an associate professor.

Lambertini joined EPFL's College of Management of Technology first as an associate professor before being promoted as full professor in 2009. Since 2007, she has held the Chair of International Finance at the EPFL's College of Management of Technology.

Since July 1, 2023, she has been the new Rector of USI, Università della Svizzera italiana.

== Research ==
Lambertini's research concerns the interplay of monetary and fiscal policies, in the inclusion of housing and mortgage default into macro-economic models, and in the analysis of regulation and macro-prudential policies in models with financial institutions.

Lambertini develops models of general equilibrium macroeconomic for the investigation of economic policies that alleviate the impact of economic crises. Her research has influenced the design of monetary and fiscal institutions as it has elucidated which interactions of monetary and fiscal policy may lead to sub-optimal equilibria. Her research illuminates the impact of austerity on competitiveness and growth. She also contributed to the development of macro-prudential regulation for banks and its effect on financial stability and lending.

== Distinctions ==
Since 2021, Lambertini has been the president of the EPFL WISH Foundation, serving as its vice-president from 2019 to 2020. Lambertini is an executive committee member and former president of the International Banking, Economics and Finance Association (IBEFA). She was an advisory council at the Society for Computational Economics (2016–2020), an editor of The B.E. Journal of Macroeconomics (2012-2019), and a member of the Committee for Funding Italian Research Project (PRIN) (2011).

She serves as a consultant for central banks and policy institutions.

Lambertini has been the recipient of the Hoover National Fellowship (2001–2002), the John L. Simpson Memorial Research Fellowship (1994), the Alfred P. Sloan Doctoral Dissertation Fellowship (1993), the University of California, Berkeley Fellowship (1992), the Luciano Jona Fellowship (1990), and the Credito Italiano Award (1988).

From 1977 to 1987 she was a member of the Italian National Handball Team.

== Selected works ==
- Azariadis, Costas; Lambertini, Luisa (2003). "Endogenous Debt Constraints in Lifecycle Economies". The Review of Economic Studies. 70 (3): 461–487. doi:10.1111/1467-937X.00252. S2CID 15954312.
- Dixit, Avinash; Lambertini, Luisa (2001). "Monetary–fiscal policy interactions and commitment versus discretion in a monetary union". European Economic Review. 45 (4–6): 977–987. doi:10.1016/S0014-2921(01)00134-9.
- Dixit, Avinash; Lambertini, Luisa (2003). "Symbiosis of monetary and fiscal policies in a monetary union". Journal of International Economics. 60 (2): 235–247. doi:10.1016/S0022-1996(02)00048-X.
- Lambertini, Luisa; Mendicino, Caterina; Teresa Punzi, Maria (2013). "Leaning against boom–bust cycles in credit and housing prices". Journal of Economic Dynamics and Control. 37 (8): 1500–1522. doi:10.1016/j.jedc.2013.03.008.
- Lambertini, Luisa; Tavares, José A. (2005). "Exchange Rates and Fiscal Adjustments: Evidence from the OECD and Implications for the EMU" (PDF). Contributions in Macroeconomics. 5 20121014. doi:10.2202/1534-6005.1168. S2CID 201123711.
- Forlati, Chiara; Lambertini, Luisa (24 August 2018). "Risky Mortgages in a DSGE Model". 24th Issue (Mar 2011) of the International Journal of Central Banking.
- Lambertini, Luisa; Mendicino, Caterina; Punzi, Maria Teresa (2013). "Expectation-driven cycles in the housing market: Evidence from survey data" (PDF). Journal of Financial Stability. 9 (4): 518–529. doi:10.1016/j.jfs.2013.07.006.
- Lambertini, Luisa; Mendicino, Caterina; Punzi, Maria Teresa (2017). "Expectations-driven cycles in the housing market" (PDF). Economic Modelling. 60: 297–312. doi:10.1016/j.econmod.2016.10.004.
