= Mauro Baranzini =

Swiss economist

- Born: 31 August 1944 (age 82); Bellinzona, Switzerland

Academic background
- Education: Scuola Superiore di Commercio of Bellinzona
- Influences: Luigi Lodovico Pasinetti and Geoff Harcourt

Academic work
- Discipline: Economics
- School or tradition: Cambridge Post-Keynesian

Mauro Leo Baranzini (born 31 August 1944 in Bellinzona, Switzerland) is a Swiss economist of the Cambridge Post-Keynesian school of thought. He was a student of Bruno Caizzi at the Scuola Superiore di Commercio of Bellinzona; of Pietro Balestra and Bernard Schmitt at the University of Fribourg, Switzerland; of David Soskice, John S. Flemming and Sir James A. Mirrlees at Oxford. Later on, while at the University of Cambridge, U.K., he came under the influence of the two senior post-Keynesian economists: Luigi Lodovico Pasinetti and Geoff Harcourt. He has written extensively with Roberto Scazzieri, of the Universities of Bologna and Cambridge and of the Lincei Academy. His contributions are mainly in the field of income and wealth distribution, both at the macro- and micro-level. In particular he has fruitfully incorporated into the post-Keynesian model of distribution and accumulation the well-known life-cycle theory of Ando-Brumberg&Modigliani, within an overlapping-generations model, and with a strong bequest motive.

== Biography ==
Mauro Baranzini was born in Bellinzona, Switzerland, 31 August 1944, son of Leo Johann Baranzini-Franki, a railways worker, and of Germana Nonella-Bassi of Sant’Antonino. (His father was born in Lucerne, son of a Swiss German mother.) He first studied at the Swiss Universities of Fribourg and Zurich. In Fribourg he obtained a PhD. in economics with a thesis on economic growth under the supervision of Pietro Balestra, a well-known econometrician. Soon after, in 1971, he was awarded a Florey European fellowship of The Queen's College, Oxford, a grant scheme to bring promising European scholars to Oxford, and subsequently a senior research fellowship of the Swiss National Science Foundation for research to be undertaken, in turn, in Oxford, Cambridge, and Harvard. In Oxford he wrote a DPhil thesis under the supervision of David Soskice, John S. Flemming and Sir James A. Mirrlees From 1975 to 1984 he was lecturer and director of economic studies at The Queen's College, Oxford.

In 1984 he moved back to Switzerland. After a spell at the Faculty of Political Sciences of the Catholic University of Milan, in 1987 he was appointed full professor of macro-economics at the University of Verona. In Switzerland he was for numerous years a member (and then chairman) of Canton Ticino's Research Committee on behalf of the Swiss National Science Foundation, and a co-founder of the Centre for Banking Studies in Lugano-Vezia.

== Academic career ==
From 1993 to 1997 he was a member (and then chairman) of the Steering Committee that laid the foundations for the State University of Lugano. He served as acting president of that university, and, since 1997, he has been a full professor of economic theory, deputy chairman (1998 to 2005), and chairman of the Faculty of Economics (2005–2009). In 2009 he was awarded the Lincei Prize for economics, jointly with Andreu Mas-Colell. He has contributed to the Cambridge theory of income, wealth distribution and accumulation, by incorporating into the post-Keynesian theory the well-known micro-economics life-cycle theory of Franco Modigliani the hypothesis of a different rate of return on accumulated savings, and the existence of a class of pure rentiers;

More generally he has focused on the applicability of the Kaldor/Pasinetti (i.e. Cambridge) theorem or equation, according to which the rate of profits (equal to the interest rate) is determined only by the rate of growth of the system and of the re-investment rate of the entrepreneurs' class.

His work was to lay the micro-foundations of the post-Keynesian theory of income distribution and wealth accumulation. By considering the post-Keynesian analysis of the productive sectors, of the composition of demand, and of the price structure as a well-developed research programme, the author focuses particularly on the supply side of savings (both life-cycle and intergenerational), linked to the behaviour of individuals, families and dynasties. The mechanisms are examined which lead families to allocate their disposable income between consumption, savings, and passing on a given amount of their financial resources to the next generation (inclusive of all types of assets). In the case of a stochastic model, characterized by the existence of two-tier investment opportunities, the long-term analysis of the model shows that uncertainty may, under general circumstances, generate a two-class society. Therefore, this approach throws additional light on the mechanisms that lead to a different accumulation of wealth and class differences.

His papers have been published in: Oxford Economic Papers, Economic Journal, Kyklos, Australian Economic Papers, Swiss Journal of Economics and Statistics, Jahrbücher für Nationalökonomie und Statistik, and other learned periodicals. He has published, often jointly with Roberto Scazzieri, volumes with Oxford University Press (A Theory of Wealth Distribution and Accumulation), Cambridge University Press (The Economic Theory of Structure and Change, recently published in paperback), Basil Blackwell, Oxford and New York (Advances in Economic Theory, and Foundations of Economics. Structure of Inquiry and Economic Theory), Macmillan (together with Geoff Harcourt, Essays in Honour of Luigi L. Pasinetti) as well as with Routledge. In the early 1990s he sparked off a controversy with Paul A. Samuelson and Koiki Miyazaki in the Oxford Economics Papers on the validity of the Keynes-Kaldor-Pasinetti theorem of the Cambridge distribution theory.

He spends part of the year in Cambridge (UK), where he is life-member of Darwin College, and in his chalet in the Swiss Alps. He has recently published two volumes on his ancestors going back the 14th century in Canton Ticino, Switzerland, where he has reconstructed the demographic strategies and wealth accumulation processes across six centuries and nearly 20 generations. He is a foreign fellow of the Istituto Lombardo, Accademia di Scienze e Lettere, Milan, of the National Academy of the Lincei, Rome, as well as life-member of The Queen's College, Oxford.

== Bibliography ==
=== English language ===
1. Mauro Baranzini (ed.) Advances in Economic Theory, Oxford: Basil Blackwell, 1982 (reprinted 1983), in the U.S.: New York: St. Martin's Press, 1983, pp. x + 321.

2. Mauro Baranzini (with R. Scazzieri, eds) Foundations of Economics. Structures of Inquiry and Economic Theory, Oxford and New York: Basil Blackwell, 1986, pp. xii + 454.

3. Mauro Baranzini (with R. Scazzieri, eds) The Economic Theory of Structure and Change, Cambridge: Cambridge University Press, 1990, pp. xiii + 347 (hardback).

4. Mauro Baranzini A Theory of Wealth Distribution and Accumulation, Oxford and New York: Oxford University Press, 1991, pp. xxvi + 262.

5. Mauro Baranzini (with G.C. Harcourt, eds) The Dynamics of the Wealth of Nations. Growth Distribution and Structural Change (Essays in honour of Luigi Pasinetti), London: Macmillan and New York: St. Martin's Press, 1993, pp. xiii + 424.

6. Mauro Baranzini (with A. Cencini, eds) Inflation and Unemployment. Contributions to a New Macroeconomic Approach, London and New York: Routledge, 1996, pp. viii + 192.

7. Mauro Baranzini, The Diaspora of the Families Nonella and Bassi of Sant’Antonino, Canton Ticino, Switzerland, from the 15th to the 21st Century, Bellinzona: SalvioniEdizioni, 2010, pp. 261.

8. Mauro Baranzini (with A. Quadrio Curzio) ‘From Adam Smith to Structural Dynamics: Luigi Pasinetti’s Life-Long Contribution’, paper presented at the Conference ‘The Economics of Structural Change: Theory, Institutions and Policies, in honour of Luigi L. Pasinetti, 2012, Gonville and Caius College, Cambridge.

9. Mauro Baranzini (with R. Scazzieri, eds) The Economic Theory of Structure and Change, Cambridge: Cambridge University Press, 2012, pp. xiii + 347 (paperback).

10. Mauro Baranzini (with A. Mirante) ‘The Cambridge Post-Keynesian School of Income and Wealth Distribution’, in G. C. Harcourt and P. Kriesler (eds) The Oxford Handbook of Post-Keynesian Economics, 2013, op. cit., Vol. I, 288–361.

11. Mauro Baranzini (with C. Rotondi and R. Scazzieri, eds) Resources, Production and Structural Dynamics, Cambridge: Cambridge University Press, 2015.

12. Mauro Baranzini (with. G. Marangoni), Richard Stone: An Annotated Bibliography, Lugano: Università della Svizzera italiana, 2015. pp. 174.

13. Mauro Baranzini (with C. Rotondi and R. Scazzieri) 'Resources, Producibility and Economic Dynamics: A Framework’, in M. Baranzini, C. Rotondi and R. Scazzieri (eds) Resources, Production and Structural Dynamics, op. cit., 1-32.

14. Mauro Baranzini (with A. Mirante) A Compendium of Italian Economists at Oxbridge: Contributions to the Evolution of Economic Thinking, 2016, London and New York: Palgrave-Macmillan, pp. 288+xii

15. Mauro Baranzini (with P. L. Porta) ‘Luigi Lodovico Pasinetti’, in R. A. Cord (ed.) The Palgrave Companion to Cambridge Economics, 2017, London and New York: Palgrave-Macmillan, 2017, pp. 979–1001.

16. Mauro Baranzini (with A. Mirante) Luigi L. Pasinetti: An Intellectual Biography, Leading Scholar and System Builder of the Cambridge School of Economics, 2018, Palgrave Studies in the History of Economic Thought, London and New York: Palgrave-Macmillan, pp. xii+390.

17. Mauro Baranzini 'Uncertainty and Time in Economics’, in AA.VV, Balzan Papers I, 2018, Fondazione Internazionale Balzan, Florence: Leo S. Olschki, 243–57.

18. Mauro Baranzini (with A. Mirante) 'At the intersection of "Polity" and "Economics": The Palgrave Handbook of Political Economy, edited by Ivano Cardinale and Roberto Scazzieri', review article, Economia&Lavoro, 2019, 53.2, pp. 127–50.

19. Mauro Baranzini (with A. Mirante) ‘Pasinetti’s Theorem: A Narrow Escape, for what was to become an Inexhaustible Research Programme’, Structural Change and Economic Dynamics, 2021, 59(C), December, pp. 470–81.

20. Mauro Baranzini (with A. Quadrio Curzio and R. Scazzieri) ‘The Political Economy of Luigi L. Pasinetti’, in E. Bellino and S. Nerozzi (eds) Pasinetti and the Classical-Keynesians. Nine Methodological Issues, Cambridge: Cambridge University Press, 2022, pp. ix-xxii.

21. Mauro Baranzini (with A. Mirante) 'Joanilio Rodolpho Teixeira: the founder and senior scholar of the Anglo-Italian-Brazilian school of post-Keynesian economics', in J. R. Faria, J. T. Araujo, J. G. de Arajujo Oliveira (eds) Income Distribution, Economic Growth and Unemployment. New Directions in Modern Economics. Edward Elgar, 2025, pp. 9–59

22. Mauro Baranzini 'Pabst A., and R. Scazzieri, The Constitution of Political Economy', L’industria, 2025, n.s., a. XLVI, n. 1, pp. 161‑162

=== Italian language ===
23. Mauro Baranzini (with R. Scazzieri) Struttura e evoluzione delle economie industriali: i fatti e le interpretazioni, Lugano: Edizioni Pantarei, 1982, pp. 198.

24. Mauro Baranzini (with A. Cencini, eds) Contributi di analisi economica, Bellinzona: Casagrande, 1987, pp. 298.

25. Mauro Baranzini Corso di economia politica, Milan: CUSL, pp. xvii + 559. (1st ed. 1986; 4th ed. 1988).

26. Mauro Baranzini (with G. Marangoni and S. Rossi) Macro e Microeconomia. Teoria ed applicazioni, Padua: CEDAM, 2001 (I ed.), 2003 (II ed.) pp. XVIII+889.

27. Mauro Baranzini (with G. Tondini) Accumulazione, distribuzione e risparmio, Padua: CEDAM, 2003, pp. 536.

28. Mauro Baranzini, et al. (eds) Analisi Economica e Società Civile, Padua: CEDAM, 2004, pp. 757.

29. Mauro Baranzini (with G. Marangoni, A. Mirante and S. Solari) Economia Macro, Padua: CEDAM, 2006, pp. 497.

30. Mauro Baranzini, Strategie patrimoniali e famigliari nella Svizzera italiana (1400-2000), I Volume: Quadro concettuale e istituzionale (XV+313 pp.); II Volume: Tre microstorie e supplemento iconografico (XL+566 pp.), Rome: Edizioni di Storia e Letteratura, 2008.

31. Mauro Baranzini (with A. Mirante) Economia Politica, Padova: CEDAM, 2013, pp. xviii+700.

32. Mauro Baranzini, L’Università della Svizzera italiana: da un sogno del 1588 alla sua realizzazione nel 1996’, lectio magistrali, Milano: Istituto Lombardo, Accademia di Scienze e Lettere, 2017, pp. 37–134.

33. Mauro Baranzini (with P. Montorfani) L’università della Svizzera italiana. La nascita di un ateneo alla fine del secondo millennio, Locarno: Dadò editore, 2021, pp. 530+LXIV.
