= Jean-Pierre Danthine =

Jean-Pierre Danthine (born May 16, 1950 in Havelange, Belgium) is a Swiss-Belgian economist and deputy chairman of the Swiss National Bank from 2012 to 2015. He has published numerous articles and books.

== Biography ==
Danthine studied economics at the Catholic University of Leuven in Belgium and earned his PhD in 1976 at Carnegie Mellon University. He then researched and lectured at various universities, including Columbia University, the University of Southern California, the University of Laval in Québec and the Aix-Marseille University in France. From 1980 to 2009, Danthine was a professor of macroeconomics and financial economics at HEC Lausanne.

From 1996 to 2005 he was managing director of the International Center for Financial Asset Management and Engineering (FAME) in Geneva. In 2006 he took over the management of the newly founded Swiss Finance Institute until 2009. He was a research fellow at the Centre for Economic Policy Research (CEPR) in London. Danthine was elected at the beginning of 2010 as a member of the board of the Swiss National Bank. In 2012 he was appointed vice president of the board.

== Publications ==
- European Labour Markets : A Long-run View, Charles R. Bean, Peter Bernholz, Jean-Pierre Danthine, Edmond Malinvaud. CEPR, 1990, ISBN 92 - 9079-110-1
- The Future of European Banking, Jean-Pierre Danthine, Francesco Giavazzi, Xavier Vives, Ernst-Ludwig Von Thadden. CEPR, 1999, ISBN 978-1898128380
- Emu and Portfolio Adjustment, Jean-Pierre Danthine. CEPR, 2001, ISBN 978-1898128588
- Intermediate Financial Theory, Jean-Pierre Danthine and John B. Donaldson. Prentice-Hall, 2001, ISBN 978-0130174468
- Intermediate Financial Theory, Jean-Pierre Danthine and John B. Donaldson. Elsevier Academic Press, 2nd Edition 2005, ISBN 978-0123693808
