= Nermin Neftçi =

Turkish politician

- Hayriye Ayşe Nermin Neftçi

Minister of Culture
- In office November 17, 1974 – March 31, 1975
- Prime Minister: Sadi Irmak
- Preceded by: Talât Sait Halman
- Succeeded by: Rıfkı Danışman

Personal details
- Born: 1924 Istanbul, Turkey
- Died: August 20, 2003 (aged 78–79) Bodrum, Muğla Province, Turkey
- Party: Republican People's Party (CHP)
- Children: 2
- Education: Law
- Alma mater: Ankara University Law School
- Occupation: Lawyer, poktician
- Profession: Jurist

Hayriye Ayşe Nermin Neftçi (1924 – August 20, 2003) was a Turkish jurist, politician and former government minister.

Hayriye Ayşe Nermin Neftçi was born in Istanbul, Turkey in 1924. She graduated from the Ankara University Law School.

Following the 1969 general election, she entered the parliament as a deputy of Muş. She became so the first Turkish female politician ever elected from the eastern provinces of Turkey after the establishment of democracy. She served in decision-making boards of the Republican People's Party (CHP). In the later years of the parliamentary term, she was appointed Deputy Speaker of the Grand National Assembly, a position that was held for the first time by a woman. She did not participate in the 1973 general election. However, she was taken into the cabinet of Sadi Irmak as the Ministry of Culture serving from November 17, 1974, to March 31, 1975.

During the voting in the parliament on April 24, 1972, about the endorsement of the execution of three young people, who were sentenced to death after the coup d'état of March 12, 1971, Neftçi was among the 48 opponents of the 323 present members of the 450-seat parliament. The decision to execute these three members of the Marxist-Leninist revolutionary People's Liberation Army of Turkey (Turkish: Türkiye Halk Kurtuluş Ordusu, abbreviated THKO), was accepted by 273 votes. Following the state president's approval, Deniz Gezmiş, Yusuf Aslan and Hüseyin İnan were hanged on May 6, 1972, that caused a long-lasting controversy in the country in the aftermath.

Nermin Neftçi wrote columns in various dailies and periodicals. She authored a book titled "O Yakadan Bu Yakaya" about the structure of the Turkish language and the folklore of the Iraqi Turkmens in Kirkuk.

Neftçi died aged 79 on August 20, 2003, in Bodrum, Muğla Province. She was mother of two sons, Salih (1947–2009), and Sinan.

Political offices
Preceded by Talât Sait Halman	Minister of Culture of Turkey; November 17, 1974 – March 31, 1975	Succeeded by Rıfkı Danışman
