= Swiss Finance Institute =

Non-profit foundation in Switzerland

- Formation: 2005
- Founder: Banks in Switzerland; SIX Swiss Exchange; Other Swiss financial sector institutions
- Type: Nonprofit
- Purpose: Promotion of higher education institutions and networks in research and teaching
- Headquarters: Zurich, Switzerland
- Fields: Finance, Education
- Key people: François Degeorge
- Website: sfi.ch/en

The Swiss Finance Institute (SFI) is an institute organized as a non-profit foundation. Its purpose is to competitively foster university institutions and networks in research and teaching, aimed at strengthening the position of Switzerland's science and financial sectors. Created in 2006 as a public–private partnership, SFI is a common initiative of the Swiss finance industry, leading Swiss universities, and the Swiss Confederation.

According to the W. P. Carey School of Business, the SFI is considered one of the top financial research institutions worldwide, based on the number of articles published in renowned academic journals.

== History ==
The institute was formed in 2005 under the auspices of the Swiss Bankers Association through the merger of its predecessor institutions: the Centre International FAME pour la Gestion de Patrimoine et l'ingénierie Financière (CFAME), the Swiss Banking School Foundation, and the Banking and Finance Foundation at the University of Zurich. It was established as a foundation based in Zurich, with initial capital of CHF 75 million.

The NCCR Finrisk, part of a federal funding instrument for research in Switzerland for evaluation and risk management in the financial sector, was later integrated into the SFI.

The Swiss Finance Institute began its operations in early 2006. The aim was to competitively promote university institutions and research and teaching networks, support academic research, and facilitate practical outcomes in both academic and industry contexts. In 2006, several Swiss universities became foundation partners.

By 2007, the SFI had established locations in Zurich, the Léman region, and Lugano, with around 40 professors among its faculty. In collaboration with universities, new professorships were created and Master’s and diploma programs were developed.

Until his appointment as a member of the three-person Governing Board of the Swiss National Bank at the beginning of 2010, the institute was led by Jean-Pierre Danthine. He had previously served for nine years as head of CFAME, one of the three predecessor organizations of the SFI.

Between February 2011 and October 2016, the institute was headed by Claudio Loderer. Since November 2016, François Degeorge has been serving as the Managing Director of the SFI.

The SFI Master Classes were introduced in 2019 to transfer academic insights in finance into practice. They are part of the revised continuing education programs aimed at experienced professionals in the industry.

In February 2022, the University of St. Gallen became a partner university, followed by the University of Basel in January 2024.

== Organization ==
The faculty of the Swiss Finance Institute (SFI) includes professors from the École Polytechnique Fédérale de Lausanne (EPFL), ETH Zurich, the Università della Svizzera italiana, the University of Basel, the University of Geneva, the University of Lausanne, the University of St. Gallen, and the University of Zurich.

The foundation is supported by the members of the Swiss Bankers Association (SBA), the umbrella organization for Swiss and foreign banks based in Switzerland, as well as the SIX Swiss Exchange. Funding is provided proportionally by the banks.

The Foundation Board is composed of business and academia representatives. The Chair of the Foundation Board is Stefan Seiler, member of the Group Executive Board of the Swiss bank UBS. The Vice-Chairs are Stephanino Isele, member of Zurich Cantonal Bank's General Management, and Olivier Roussy, member of Raiffeisen Switzerland's Board of Directors. The Foundation Board is supported by a Scientific Council of international finance scholars. The Chair of the Council is Marco Pagano from the University of Naples Federico II.

== Activities ==
The Swiss Finance Institute is a research and educational institution in the field of banking and finance in Switzerland. It was established to promote academic research in this area and to facilitate the exchange between academia and practice.

=== Academic activities ===
The approximately 100 professors who are part of the SFI faculty conduct research and teach in the fields of Financial Markets, Financial Institutions, Portfolio Management and Asset Classes, Corporate Finance and Governance, as well as Frontier Topics. SFI faculty members publish scientific papers in internationally renowned academic journals and present their findings at conferences as well as academic and practice-oriented events.

The SFI’s partner universities offer programs in banking and finance at both the bachelor's and master's level. In addition, SFI operates a PhD program in finance and cooperates with its Swiss partner universities, which are responsible for offering the degree programs and delivering the associated courses. The SFI itself does not award academic degrees.

In addition to providing financial support, the SFI annually awards the SFI Outstanding Paper Award, which recognizes unpublished research contributions in the field of finance.

=== Industry-oriented activities ===
The SFI organizes workshops, further education programs, and public events and lectures to support the transfer of academic knowledge to professionals at its supporting banks. Among its continuing education offerings are the SFI Master Classes. This format is led by professionals from the financial industry as well as SFI faculty members. Unlike other continuing education offerings, the courses are more flexible in terms of scheduling, allowing them to address current topics and developments in the financial sector in a timely manner. The courses are primarily aimed at experienced industry practitioners.

== See also ==
- Professional certification in financial services
- New York Institute of Finance
- Amsterdam Institute of Finance
- The London Institute of Banking & Finance
