= Implicit contract =

Implicit contract may refer to either of these related concepts:

- Implied-in-fact contract in law
- Implicit contract theory in economics
