= New York Institute of Finance =

American for-profit provider of continuing professional education

- Type: Continuing education institute, for-profit
- Established: 1922
- Location: New York City, New York, United States
- Website: www.nyif.com

The New York Institute of Finance (NYIF) is an American for-profit provider of continuing professional education that was founded by the New York Stock Exchange (NYSE) in 1922.

The institute provides continuing education to professionals in the financial services industry and corporations worldwide. The institute owns the trademark "Where Wall Street Goes to School".

== History ==
“In 1921 it became evident that, for the sake of the business itself and for the sake of the thousands of young men and women employed by the Exchange and by its member firms, some method should be devised whereby they might learn the fundamentals; the reasons why they did the things which occupied their working days…”

This need inspired the establishment of the Stock Exchange Institute. Its growth has shown that it serves an important purpose. Through classes and lectures in New York, as well as correspondence courses for students at a distance, the Institute offers instruction in all major areas of the securities business. These programs allow working men and women to gain an education in finance and related subjects.

In 1924, 205 graduated from the New York Stock Exchange Institute. The following year, the institute introduced the “Mock Market”, a trading simulation on the floor of the NYSE after hours becoming an integral part of the one-year training program for new employees of the exchange. By 1930 courses of the institute were extended to employees of member firms of the Exchange.

The first record of “The New York Institute of Finance” appears in the minutes of the NYSE Board of Governors meeting, October 8, 1942: “Permission has been granted to the New York Institute of Finance to use the Board of Governors meeting room for a lecture course and a portion of the Exchange Floor, after hours, for drill purposes, in connection with a course in military training which is being organized.” The New York Institute of Finance is headed by Albert P. Squier, who had been Associate Director of the Stock Exchange Institute for many years.

The New York Institute of Finance was sold from the New York Stock Exchange to Prentice-Hall in 1960. Via an acquisition of Prentice-Hall by Pearson plc, ownership and management of the New York Institute of Finance moved to Pearson plc, which owns both the New York Institute of Finance and Prentice-Hall. In 2008 the Institute opened its Beijing office. In 2013 ownership of the Institute was transferred to a Pearson company, the Financial Times Group. The Institute's head office is based in Manhattan New York. It teaches a curriculum of professional workplace skills-training in over 120 different financial training courses and offers its own qualifications and Professional Certificates. In 2015 the Institute had over 35,000 students in more than 120 countries, the majority studying via its e-learning library. In 2017, the NYIF was sold by the Financial Times Group and is now an independent company, after its purchase by a consortium of other companies instead along with Pearson PLC.

== Accreditations ==
The New York Institute of Finance works with several associations and organizations to complement their educational programs including:

- National Association of State Boards of Accountancy (NASBA)
- CFA Institute
- Certified Financial Planner Board of Standards (CFP Board)
- CMT Association
- The Institute of Certified Bankers (ICB)
- Association of Certified Anti-Money Laundering Specialists (ACAMS)
- Institute of Certified Public Accountants of Singapore (ICPAS)
- Chartered Investment Banking Analyst
- Financial Data Scientist
- Project Management Institute (PMI)
- International Association for Continuing Education and Training
- Global Association of Risk Professionals
- FutureLearn
- New York State Education Department (NYSED)
- edX

=== Past delegates include ===
- Warren Buffett - In 1947, Buffett entered the Wharton School of the University of Pennsylvania. Warren studied there for two years and joined the Alpha Sigma Phi fraternity. He then transferred to the University of Nebraska where at 19, he graduated with a Bachelor of Science in Business Administration. After being rejected by Harvard Business School, Buffett enrolled at Columbia Business School of Columbia University upon learning that Benjamin Graham taught there. He earned a Master of Science in Economics from Columbia in 1951. After graduating, Buffett attended the New York Institute of Finance.

== See also ==
- Professional certification in financial services
- Swiss Finance Institute
- Amsterdam Institute of Finance
- The London Institute of Banking & Finance
