= European Finance Association =

Professional finance association

- Abbreviation: EFA
- Established: 1974; 52 years ago
- Type: International non-profit organization (INPO / AISBL / IVZW) in Belgium
- Legal status: Professional association
- Purpose: Professional society for academics and practitioners in the greater field of finance
- Location: Brussels, Belgium
- Region served: Europe
- Members: 2,500 professional (2024)
- Official languages: English
- President: Albert J Menkveld
- Funding: Membership fees
- Website: european-finance.org

The European Finance Association (EFA) is a professional association of more than 2,500 professionals and financial economists involved in the high-level research, study, teaching, and practice of finance.

The EFA organises an annual meeting in August as well as doctoral events including an intensive and competitive tutorial designed for PhD students and publishes a journal, the Review of Finance.

== History ==
The association was founded in 1974 and hosts an annual meeting in August. The 40th annual meeting of the EFA was held in Cambridge, UK in 2013. In 2021, the 48th annual meeting was chaired by EFA President Professor Elena Carletti and was organised by Bocconi University in Milan, Italy in August 2021.

The 49th annual meeting was organised by IESE Business School in Barcelona, Spain, in August 2022 and chaired by EFA Vice President Professor Xavier Vives. The 50th annual meeting was held in Amsterdam, the Netherlands, in 2023, chaired by Professor Albert J. Mankveld at Vrije Universiteit Amsterdam. The 51st annual meeting was held in Bratislava, Slovakia by the National Bank of Slovakia in 2024.

== Services ==
EFA also organises doctoral events including an intensive and competitive tutorial designed for PhD students in Finance who are nearing the end of their doctoral thesis and will soon be on the job market.

The flagship journal of the European Finance Association is the Review of Finance. As of 2023, its managing editor is Alex Edmans. The peer-reviewed journal is published by Oxford University Press. Two prizes are awarded for papers published in Review of Finance: the Spängler IQAM Prize and the Pagano and Zechner Prize which are presented at the EFA Annual Meeting.

== Structure ==
The EFA is an international non-profit organization (INPO / AISBL / IVZW) registered in Belgium at the following address: European Finance Association, Rue Fossé aux Loups, 38, 1000 Brussels, Belgium with Company Number RPM/RPR 0864.639.588.
