= Outline of management =

Overview of concepts related to management

The following outline is provided as an overview of and topical guide to management:

Management (or managing) is the administration of organizations, whether they are a business, a nonprofit organization, or a government body. The following outline provides a general overview of the concept of management as a whole.

For business management, see Outline of business management.

== Introduction ==
- Delegation
- Hierarchy
  - Authority
- Institution
  - Institutional analysis
  - Institutional repository
  - Institutional research
- Mission statement
- Performance
  - Performance appraisal
  - Performance measurement
    - Performance indicator
- Policy
  - Policy analysis
  - Policy studies
- Supervision

== Aspects ==
- Management auditing
  - Management due diligence
- Management buyout
- Management contract
- Management development
- Management process
- Managerial psychology
- Management style
- Management system

== Theory ==
- Actor-network theory
- Control theory
  - Management control system
- Decision theory
  - Feedback
  - Game theory
- Error management theory
- Evidence-based practice
- Functional leadership model
- Institutional theory
- Meta-system
- Multi-agent system
- Operations research
- Organizational theory
- Query theory
- Queueing theory
- Situational leadership theory
- Theory of constraints
- Theory X and Theory Y

== Science ==
- Management science
  - Certificate in Management Studies
  - PhD in management
  - PhD-MBA
- Management cybernetics
  - Feedforward (management)
  - Second-order cybernetics
    - Recursion

== Concepts ==
- Abilene paradox
- CEO succession
- Design leadership
- Ethical code
- F-law
- Franchising
- Human systems engineering
- Integrated Management Concept
- Managerial economics
- Managerialism
- Morale
- New Institutional Economics
- Pareto efficiency
- Plan
- Risk assessment
- Social entrepreneurship
- Target culture

== Occupations ==
- Account executive
- Account manager
- Communications manager
- Equipment manager
- Hotel manager
- Management consulting
- Operations director
- Portfolio manager
- Product manager
- Project manager
- Property manager
- Site manager
- Store manager
- Talent manager
- Technical director
- Tour manager

== Decision-making ==
- Decentralized decision-making
- Decision analysis
- Decision management
  - Choice modelling
  - Rational choice theory

== Disciplines ==
- Behavioral operations management
- Brand management
- Capability management
- Emergency management
- Engineering management
  - Materials management
- Evidence-based management
- Financial management
- Information management
  - Content management
    - Enterprise content management
  - Information technology management
  - Records management
- Legal management (academic discipline)
- New public management
- Office management
- Quality management
- R&D management
- Scientific management
- Service management
- Team management
- Technology management
- Traffic management
  - Fleet management
- Workforce management
  - Human resource management
    - Onboarding
  - Incentive program
  - Staff management

== Governance ==
- Community governance
- Constitution
  - Statute
- Corporate governance
  - Articles of association
  - By-law
  - Corporate finance
  - Corporate group
- Global governance
- Governance framework
- Governing body
- Network governance
- Sports governing body

== Positions ==
- Board of directors
- Branch manager
- Chairperson
- Organizational founder
- Founder/ceo
- Corporate title
  - President (corporate title)
  - Vice president
- Director general
- Line management
- Middle management
- Senior management
- Supervisor
  - Supervisory board

== Entities ==
- Corporation
- Foundation (nonprofit)
- Government agency
- Holding company
- International agency
- Limited liability partnership
- Nonprofit organization
- Public administration

== Styles of management ==
- Adaptive management
- Agile management
  - Agile leadership
- Evidence-based management
- Feminine style of management
- Hands-on management
- Macromanagement
- Micromanagement
- Management by exception
- Management by objectives
- Management by observation
- Matrix management
- Participatory management
- Process-based management
- Reverse hierarchy
- Serious play
- Sustainable management

== Types of management ==
=== Financial ===
- Asset management
- Capital management
- Investment management
- Revenue management
  - Venture management
    - Innovation management
  - Treasury management
  - Yield management

=== Business ===
- Commercial management
- Stakeholder management
  - Shareholder primacy
  - Shareholder value
- Strategic management
  - Change management
  - Global R&D management
  - Performance management
    - Results-based management
  - Turnaround management
- Total quality management

=== Operations ===
- Facility management
- Industrial management
- Property management
- Resource management
- Supply chain management
  - Logistics management
- Systems management

=== Immaterial ===
- Attention management
- Communications management
  - Advertising management
- Knowledge management
- Release management
- Virtual management

=== Various ===
- Collateral management
- Community management
- Interim management
- Network management
- Security management
- Task management

== Institutes ==
- Chartered Management Institute
- Institute of Administrative Management
- Institute of Commercial Management
- Institute of Management Accountants
- Institute of Management and Economics
- Institute for Operations Research and the Management Sciences
- Management Institute of Canada
- Project Management Institute

== Related lists ==
- Index of management articles
- List of accounting topics
- Outline of academic disciplines
- Outline of economics
- Outline of organizational theory
