= Hands-on =

"Hands-on" refers to human interaction, often with technology. It implies active participation in a direct and practical way.

Hands-on or Hands-On may refer to:

- Hands-on computing, a branch of human-computer interaction (HCI) research
- Hands-on-throttle-and-stick (HOTAS)
- Hands-On Electronics magazine
- Hands-On Mobile company
- Global Hands-On Universe project
- Hands-on management style

== See also ==
- Hands-off (disambiguation)
- Handoff (disambiguation)
- Handover (disambiguation)
- The Hands-On Guide for Science Communicators book
- Ann Arbor Hands-On Museum, a US science museum
- Hands On USA, a relief project for Hurricane Katrina
