= Management style =

Methods of maintaining order in a work environment

Management consists of the planning, prioritizing, and organizing work efforts to accomplish objectives within a business organization. A management style is the particular way managers go about accomplishing these objectives. It encompasses the way they make decisions, how they plan and organize work, and how they exercise authority.

Management styles varies by company, level of management, and even from person to person. A good manager is one that can adjust their management style to suit different environments and employees. An individual’s management style is shaped by many different factors including internal and external business environments, and how one views the role of work in the lives of employees.

== Factors that shape the management style ==
=== Internal factors ===
Internal company factors that determine a management style include, but are not limited to, policies, priorities, corporate culture, staff skill levels, motivation and management structures.

In order to be effective, a manager’s style and outlook must fit into the business's organizational culture. Their style must adhere to the policies and procedures set forth by the organization, and they must be able to achieve company objectives. They are responsible for controlling an effective work team and must uphold organizational beliefs within that team. A manager who cannot do this would likely be deemed ineffective and be removed from the position.

Staff skill levels and motivation greatly affect management styles as it is necessary for a manager to accomplish objectives while maintaining a content and effective work team. Less skilled or motivated employees would require a style that is more controlling and fosters consistent supervision to ensure productivity. Highly motivated or skilled employees require less supervision and direction as they are typically more technically skilled than management and have the ability, and desire, to make more autonomous decisions. These employees would benefit from a management style that is less controlling or hands-off.

Hierarchical management structures call for decision to be made solely by upper management, and within the scope of a manager’s position in the hierarchy. These types of organizations require more controlling management styles in order to meet objectives and get things done as specified. Flatter structures with more decentralized decision-making benefit from management styles that encourage team communication and employee’s contribution with regard to decision-making.

=== External factors ===
External factors affecting management styles are those that are outside of the control of the organization. These include, but are not limited to consumers, suppliers, competitors, the economy, and the law.

Some examples of these factors are a competitor who offers a more autonomous environment for skilled employees and control the job pool; the economy for a specific manufactured good results in a spike in demand causing a production crisis; the laws for a specific industry change and require employees who have extensive knowledge and certification causing the company employees talent and motivation to change.

=== Theory X and Theory Y ===
Douglas McGregor introduced Theory X and Theory Y in 1957. This psychological concept proposed that how one viewed human relationships to those of an enterprise determined their style of management.

Theory X proposes that people inherently lack the motivation and desire for responsibility and need to be closely supervised, directed, and tightly controlled in order to achieve team objectives. Without it, workers may become unwilling to work. This is considered the more conventional theory and results in management styles that have high degrees of control over employees.

Theory Y conversely suggests that it is human nature to be motivated by objectives and gain satisfaction through the completion of work. Those who believe in Theory Y believe that it is the responsibility of management to foster environments where employees can develop potential and utilize their skills to achieve objectives. This perspective leads to management styles that give the workers more decision making control and provide less supervision.

== Types of management styles ==
All management styles can be categorized by three major types: Autocratic, Democratic, and Laissez-Faire, with Autocratic being the most controlling and Laissez-Faire being the least controlling.

=== Autocratic ===
Autocratic management is the most controlling of the management styles. Variations of this style are authoritative, persuasive, and paternalistic. Autocratic managers make all of the decisions in the workplace. Communication with this type of management is one way, top-down to the employees. Employee ideas and contributions are not encouraged or considered necessary. Roles and tasks are clearly defined, and workers are expected to follow these directions without question while being consistently checked and supervised.

This type of style is particularly useful in organizations with hierarchical structures where management makes all of the decisions based on positioning in the hierarchy. Employees that benefit from this style of management include those who are new, unskilled, or unmotivated, as they need the supervision and clear direction. Managers can benefit greatly from using this style in times of crisis or serious time constraints.

The advantages of the autocratic management style are little uncertainty, clearly defined roles and expectations for employees, and the speed of decision-making. All decisions are made by the manager and employees are expected to be compliant leaving little room for variation or confusion. Decision-making speed is ideal and is not slowed by conflicting thought or agendas.

Disadvantages include lack of staff input with ideas that are not encouraged or shared. This can lead to job dissatisfaction, absenteeism, and employee turnover. Because managers make all of the decisions, the employees are not inclined to act autonomously and may become too dependent on the manager. Not all employees want or need supervision, and as a result can become resentful and unhappy. Too many dissatisfied employees and the separation of power with an autocratic management style can lead to an ‘us vs them’ mentality.

=== Authoritative style ===
With this management style, there is little trust or confidence in employees. This manager dictates orders to employees and expects that they do exactly as required. These employees are unskilled. This requires constant teaching and coaching of the staff as well as consistent supervision.

=== Persuasive style ===
Using this management style, the manager still makes all decisions for employees but then convinces employees that these decisions were made in the best interest of the team. The only real difference here is that it can establish a higher level of trust between management and staff.

=== Paternalistic or exploitative/authoritative style ===
The manager still makes all of the decisions in this style of management and treats the employees in a condescending or paternalistic way. The decisions are made in the best interest of the employees and the manager explains these decisions and the importance of them to the employees. These employees may feel well taken care of and looked after by the paternalistic manager but may become resentful of not being taken seriously. This style breeds highly dependent employees.

=== Democratic ===
The democratic management style involves managers reaching decisions with the input of the employees but being responsible for making the final decision. There are many variations of this style of management including consultative, participative, and collaborative styles. Employee ideas and contributions are encouraged, but not necessary. Communication is both top-down and bottom-up and makes for a cohesive team.

This type of style is versatile with the advantages of having more diverse perspectives involved in decision making. As employees are being taken into account before the manager makes decisions, the employees feel valued which increases motivation and productivity.

Disadvantages of the democratic management style are the time it takes to make a decision due to the gathering of ideas and opinions. There is also the potential conflict of different viewpoints playing a role in the decision making and as a result, employees can feel less valued if their input is not taken, leading to decreased morale and productivity.

=== Consultative style ===
In consultative style of management, employees are trusted, and the management often seeks their opinions on key decisions.

=== Participative style ===
Similar to consultative, management trusts the employees, but trusts them completely and not only seeks out their opinions and ideas, but they act on them. They work together to make decisions as a group and the staff is highly involved. As a result, employees feel valued and show increased motivation and productivity. However, a drawback to this style is that some employees do not want to be involved in decision making and can come to resent a manager with this style.

=== Collaborative style ===
Managers with the collaborative style communicated extensively with employees and make decisions by the majority. The manager believes that involving everyone and making the team take ownership will result in the best decisions made. The main disadvantage of this style is that it is time-consuming, and sometimes the majority decision is not the best decision for the business entity, in which case, the manager should take control of the final choice.

=== Laissez-faire ===
The laissez-faire management style involves little or no interference from management. The staff do not need supervision and are highly skilled, which allows management to take a "hand's off" approach and leave the problem solving and decision making to the staff. Variations of this style include the delegative style and what is referred to as a "bossless" environment or a self-managed team.

This type of style works best in organizations with flatter decentralized management. Typically, the staff is highly skilled, more so than the management, and is trusted with setting the bar for innovation and setting the objectives.

The advantages of laissez-faire are increased innovation and creativity through the autonomy of expert staff. Some examples of this type of employee are teachers, creatives, and designers.

Disadvantages include the risk of low productivity by unsupervised staff and loss of direction due to the hands-off style of management.

=== Delegative style ===
A delegative management style or management by delegation (MbD) allows employees to take full responsibility for their areas of work. The manager assigns tasks with little or no direction and expects the staff to achieve results of their own accord. The manager retains responsibility for meeting objectives. The major drawbacks of this style are lack of uniformity among team members and uncoordinated efforts toward productivity. Also, because little direction and guidance is given, a team can lack direction and focus.

Reinhard Höhn (1904-2000) popularised delegative management with the Harzburg Model in West Germany, particularly in the 1960s and 1970s.

== Bossless or self-managed teams ==
Although self managed teams (SMT) and bossless environments are not management styles, they are a style of management chosen by an organization. Like the Laissez-Faire management style, employees in these environments are highly skilled and motivated, but take it a step further as they are also highly educated, self directed, and know a great deal more about the work than management. SMT’s can report directly to directors or can have managers who follow the delegative, or participative style, but these teams require more leadership than management to remain productive.

== Management by walking around (MBWA) ==
Management by walking around is not an actual management style, it is more of a practice, but still it is labeled as such. Managers who practice MBWA place importance on rich levels of interpersonal communication. They believe that managers have a tendency to become separated from staff and should focus efforts on understanding employees’ work and being visible and accessible. Managers walk around the premises checking with employees and on the status of ongoing projects. This practice can be helpful in maintaining contact with employees and offering guidance as well as mitigating problems, however MBWA may also lower productivity levels by distracting employees.

== See also ==
- Leadership
  - Full range leadership model
  - Leadership style
- Hands-on management
- Management by objectives
- Management by observation
- Workers' self-management
- Open-book management
- Mushroom management – Company with dysfunctional communication between managers and employees
- Seagull management – Dysfunctional management style
- Dunning–Kruger effect – Cognitive bias about one's own skill
- Peter Principle – Management concept by Laurence J. Peter
- Competence (human resources) – Ability of a person to do a job properly
- Micromanagement – Excessive attention or control by a manager
- Carrot and stick – Metaphor for the use of punishment and reward
- Kiss up kick down – Form of social malfunction
