= Hands-off =

"Hands-off" refers to not interfering with something.

Hands-off or hands off can also refer to:

== Business ==
- Hands-off management, a management style that is less controlling and allowing other people to make decisions, and can be viewed as the opposite of hands-on management

== Popular culture ==
- Hands Off! (film), a 1921 American silent Western film
- Hands Off Me!, a 1937 Italian comedy film
- "Hands Off" (song), a 1955 rhythm and blues recording
- "Hands Off...She's Mine", a 1980 song by British new wave band The Beat
- "Hands Off", a 2019 song by MUNA from their album Saves the World
- Hands Off: Sawaranaide Kotesashi-kun, a manga series
- Hands Off! (manga), originally serialized between 1998 and 2001
- Hands Off Gretel, a UK punk rock band formed in 2015

== Politics ==
- Hands Off Russia, an international political campaign launched by British Socialists in 1919
- Hands Off China, a mass protest campaign in the United Kingdom from 1925 to 1927
- Hands Off Venezuela, a political lobby group based in the United Kingdom established in 2002
- Hands Off the People of Iran, a political organisation founded in the United Kingdom in 2007
- Hands off our Forest, a 2010 British protest against the proposed sale of publicly owned land
- Hands Off protests, political demonstrations against U.S. president Donald Trump in 2025
- Hands off Greenland protests, protests in Greenland and Denmark against Trump in 2026

== See also ==
- Hand of God (disambiguation)
- Handoff (disambiguation)
- Handover (disambiguation)
- Hands-on (disambiguation)
