= William Halal =

American academic and engineer

William E. Halal
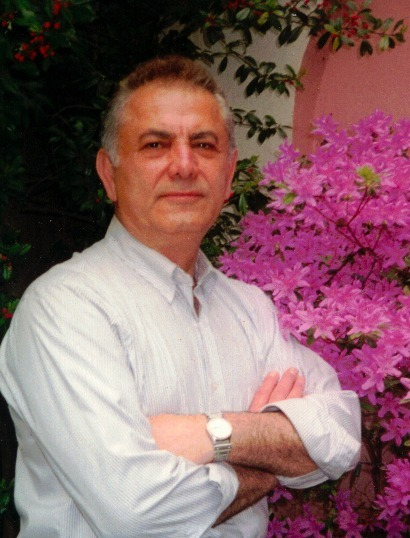
- Occupations: Aerospace engineer, air force officer, professor, author, consultant, speaker, and entrepreneur

Academic background
- Education: Purdue University (BS); University of California, Berkeley (MBA, PhD)

Academic work
- Institutions: George Washington University

William E. Halal (born June 29, 1933) is an American aerospace engineer, air force officer, academic, author, consultant, and speaker. He is professor emeritus of Management, Technology & Innovation at George Washington University, Washington, DC as well as the Founder and President of TechCast, a web-based system that uses knowledge to forecast breakthroughs on emerging technologies and social trends.

He is known for his work in the areas of emerging technology, strategic planning, and innovation, with a particular focus on strategic foresight, social evolution, knowledge, intelligence, consciousness, and institutional change. His research has been featured in newspapers, including Newsweek, The Washington Post and The New York Times to newsletters. He is the author of seven books including The New Capitalism, Internal Markets, The Infinite Resource, Technology's Promise, Beyond Knowledge and 21st Century Economics. His latest book is One World: The Digital Revolution and the Rise of Global Consciousness.

He substituted for Peter Drucker in giving a talk to 2000 managers at the Los Angeles Coliseum.

== Education ==
Halal completed his Bachelor of Science in Aerospace Engineering from Purdue University in 1956. In 1970 he completed his Master of Business Administration from the University of California, Berkeley followed by a PhD in Social Sciences from the same institution in 1971.

== Career ==
Halal began his academic career by joining San Francisco State University in 1970 while completing his PhD This was followed by an appointment at the American University, Washington, DC in 1971. In 1979, he joined George Washington University. He co-founded the Institute for Knowledge & Innovation as a joint effort between the GW School of Engineering and the School of Business. In 2010, he was appointed as professor emeritus of Management, Technology & Innovation at George Washington University.

Halal is an Air Force veteran who served as an Aerospace Engineer on Apollo's Lunar Module and held the rank of Major during his time in the US Air Force. During his career at GW, Halal co-founded the Institute for Knowledge & Innovation, a collaborative initiative between the university's School of Business and School of Engineering.

In 2025 Halal and his wife established the William Halal Research Fund at the GW School of Business. The fund supports faculty research in stakeholder collaboration and organizational approaches that consider the interests of multiple stakeholders rather than shareholders alone.

== TechCast ==
He is also the Founder and President of TechCast, a virtual think-tank that provides forecast and strategy reports related to critical global trends. Halal is the founder of TechCast, a web-based system that pools the knowledge of experts to forecast the entire tech revolution and its profound social impacts, including breakthroughs in roughly 50 emerging technologies, 30 social trends, and 25 wild cards. The TechCast Project has won awards, been cited by the National Academies, featured in the Washington Post and published in Newsweek and The Futurist. Halal's publications in this field include his book, Technologies Promise, and several research articles, such as Forecasting the Technology Revolution.

== Research ==
Halal's research on innovation, organization design, and knowledge management has won him the 1977 Mitchell Prize and a medal from the Freedom Foundation. He has authored numerous publications spanning the areas of institutional change, strategic planning, and forecasting emerging technologies including articles in peer-reviewed journals and books. Halal has been rated among the top .5% of scholars worldwide in publications and citations.

=== Management and organizational change ===
An early focus of Halal's work was the relationship between organizational structure and changing economic and technological conditions. His book, The New Capitalism, outlined how the Information Age is transforming business and society by extending Western ideals of free enterprise and democracy into corporations and other social institutions. His book also questioned current beliefs about the economy, society, and politics by discussing how certain unstoppable forces are influencing modern-day nations and institutions. In his book review, Lawrence J. Lad, stated that The book is a rich and easy treatment of what's wrong with old capitalism and what's right about new capitalism in its flexible, client-centered symbiotic, network organized approach to business.

His book Internal Markets: Bringing the Power of Free Enterprise Inside Your Organization (1993), written with Ali Geranmayeh and John Pourdehnad, Halal examined the use of market mechanisms within organizations. The book considered ways in which internal organizational units could operate with greater autonomy and entrepreneurial responsibility.

A seminal article, The Collaborative Enterprise, presented survey data showing the emergence of a stakeholder model of the firm uniting principles of profitability with responsibility and how they form a competitive advantage. Coauthored with Kenneth Taylor, 21st Century Economics was published as an anthology containing essays by scholars anticipating political economy on this side of the Millennium.

Halal's article The ‘democratic enterprise’ will redefine our society in Fortune argues that the traditional shareholder-focused capitalism is outdated and contributes to economic inequality and reduced productivity, he also advocates for a shift toward a "democratic enterprise," where businesses prioritize all stakeholders including workers, customers, and the public promoting collaboration and shared value creation.

=== Knowledge management ===
His book The Infinite Resource (1998) considered knowledge and human intellectual capabilities as resources in an economy increasingly based on information and innovation. He subsequently wrote about organizational intelligence, online learning, and knowledge-sharing systems.

=== Technology forecasting ===
Technology forecasting became a central component of Halal's later work. Through TechCast, he developed methods for collecting assessments from experts and using them to identify potentially significant technological developments.

His 2013 article "Forecasting the Technology Revolution: Results and Learnings from the TechCast Project," published in Technological Forecasting and Social Change, examined the results and methods of the project. His forecasting work has also been cited in discussions of methods for anticipating disruptive technologies.

Halal examined the impact of the information technology revolution on remote work and dynamic business units, market mechanisms replacing bureaucratic hierarchies within corporations, allowing employees to function as partially autonomous entrepreneurs. This idea is part of his broader TeleLiving vision, encompassing telework, telemedicine, e-commerce, and distance learning all conducted online. In his further research on knowledge management, he proposed the use of online learning and research systems, citing their resourcefulness for organizations in making well-informed forecasts, evaluating strategies, and reaching decisive conclusions.

=== Social evolution and global change ===
His investigation into the Global MegaCrisis revealed that a significant deterioration could occur, leading to disaster or gradual worsening of severe problems. To address this, he proposed sustainable practices, renewable energy, and global collaboration as viable measures. His further research found that factors like climate change and financial instability posed a high risk of significant global disasters or even civilization collapse in several regions across the globe. The findings of the study also suggested that green business, e-commerce, alternative energy, climate control, and AI could play a significant role in promoting a sustainable future. His article "Through the MegaCrisis" that was awarded Outstanding Paper of the Year by Emerald.

Halal's book, Beyond Knowledge: How Technology Is Driving an Age of Consciousness, was published in 2022. Drawing on a model of social evolution using historic data, the book shows how digital technology, smartphones, and AI are automating knowledge, thereby driving attention beyond knowledge into an Age of Consciousness.

He conducted a study, "Strategic Planning In the Fortune 500," sponsored by General Motors, and plotted the stages of technological development making up the Life Cycle of Evolution.

His book One World? offers a vision of global convergence being forged in the crucible of digital revolution. Grounded in scientific model of social evolution and compelling evidence, civilization is seen as a superorganism evolving through its own life cycle, now unfolding toward a mature, interconnected world.

== Military and aerospace work ==
Before his academic career, Halal worked in aerospace and served in the U.S. Air Force. During his military service he flew transport aircraft and later worked as an aerospace engineer. George Washington University identifies him as having worked as an aerospace engineer on the Apollo program before becoming an academic.

== Awards and honors ==
- 1977 – Mitchell Prize, for his paper "Beyond the Profit-Motive." The award included a $10,000 honorarium.
- 1985 – George Washington Honor Medal, awarded by the Freedoms Foundation at Valley Forge for work relating to enterprise.
- 2003 – First Prize, AOL Competition of the Virginia Center for Innovative Technology.
- 2013 – Outstanding Paper Award, Emerald Publishing, for "Through the MegaCrisis: The Passage to Global Maturity."
- 2022 – Lifetime Achievement Award, Visioneers International
- 2025 – William Halal Research Fund established at George Washington University, recognizing his contribution to the university's research community and continuing his work on stakeholder collaboration.

== Selected publications ==
=== Books ===
- The New Capitalism (1986) ISBN 978-0-471-87472-0
- Internal Markets (1993) ISBN 978-0-471-59364-5
- The New Management : Bringing Democracy & Markets Inside Organizations (1996) ISBN 978-1-881052-53-1
- The Infinite Resource (1998) ISBN 978-0-7879-1015-0
- Twenty-first Century Economics: Perspectives of Socioeconomics for a Changing World (1999) ISBN 978-0-312-16199-6
- Technology's Promise: Expert Knowledge on the Transformation of Business and Society (2008) ISBN 978-0-230-01954-6
- Beyond Knowledge: How Technology Is Driving an Age of Consciousness (2022) ISBN 978-1-7372950-1-3
- One World: The Digital Revolution and the Rise of Global Consciousness (Herndon, VA: Amplify, 2025)

=== Selected articles and chapters ===
- Halal, W. E. (1984). Strategic management: The state-of-the-art and beyond. Technological Forecasting and Social Change.
- Halal, W. E. (2001). The collaborative enterprise: A stakeholder model uniting profitability and responsibility. The Journal of Corporate Citizenship.
- Halal, W. E. (2002). Organizational intelligence: A broader framework for understanding knowledge. On the Horizon.
- Halal, W. E. (2005). Knowledge management: How to foster creation and flow. Handbook of Business Strategy.
- Halal, W. E. (2007). Forecasting the technology revolution. Business Strategy Series.
- Halal, W. E. (2009). Global megacrisis survey: Four scenarios on a pessimism/optimism axis. World Futures Review, with Michael Marien.
- Halal, W. E. (2013). Forecasting the technology revolution: Results and learnings from the TechCast Project. Technological Forecasting and Social Change.
- Halal, W. E. (2013). Through the megacrisis: The passage to global maturity. Foresight.
- Halal, W. E., Garretson, J., & Davies, O. (2022). Updating strategy for a high-tech world: Constant change from the bottom up and the outside in. Foresight, 24(1), 37–54.
- Halal, W. E. (2023). Talking across differences: A paradigm for raising consciousness. Journal of Futures Studies.
