= Seagull management =

Dysfunctional management style

Seagull management is a management style wherein a manager only interacts with employees when suspecting that a problem has arisen. The perception is that such a management style involves hasty decisions about things of which the manager has little understanding, leading to disruption and the disorientation of resources.

The phrase is a figure of speech comparing such a manager to a typical squawking and messy seagull, with one employee characterising seagull managers as those who "flew in, made a lot of noise, dumped on everyone from a great height, then flew out again, leaving others to deal with the consequences".

== See also ==
- Mushroom management – Company with dysfunctional communication between managers and employees
- Dunning–Kruger effect – Cognitive bias about one's own skill
- Peter principle – Management concept by Laurence J. Peter
- Competence (human resources) – Ability of a person to do a job properly
- Micromanagement – Excessive attention or control by a manager
- Carrot and stick – Metaphor for the use of punishment and reward
- Kiss up kick down – Form of social malfunction
