= Macromanagement =

Management style in business

Macromanagement is a style of leadership that is hands-off or from afar, allowing employees to have more freedom and control over their own work, while employers may shift their focus to strategic long-term goals.

Contrary to micromanagement, where managers closely observe and control the work of their employees, macromanagement is a more independent style of organizational management. Managers step back and give employees the freedom to do their job as they see fit, as long as the desired result is achieved. Micromanagement often focuses on short-term results, while macromanagement emphasizes long-term outcomes.

Both styles of management are viewed negatively when taken to an extreme. Therefore, it is important for organizations to develop a balance between micro- and macromanagement practices and understand when to apply each approach effectively.

The downsides of macromanagement include a potential disconnect between managers and employees, as well as a lack of understanding regarding the roles and responsibilities of employees. These factors can contribute to an impression of bureaucracy within the workplace.

Another interpretation of macromanagement is when an organization perceives itself as a social institution, aligning its goals and purpose with the aim of serving society. To achieve this, the organization ensures that its values, norms, and ethics are in harmony with those of the society in which it operates.

In 1971, Alan Wells defined a social institution as “patterns of rules, customs, norms, beliefs and roles that are instrumentally related to the needs and purposes of society.” Other examples of social institutions in this respect include government and religious organizations, some more in-line with serving society that others.

This interpretation of macromanagement is less about managing employees, but rather managing the organization from a broader perspective that is oriented toward the future. An organization that practices macromanagement greatly considers the future of the organization, the future of society, and their impact on one another.

== See also ==
- Outline of management

== Bibliography ==
1. McFarland, Dalton E.(1977). Management, Humanism, and Society: The Case for Macromanagement Theory. Academy of Management. Retrieved 20 October 2017.
