= Amsterdam University of Applied Sciences =

University in the Netherlands

Coordinates: 52°20′44.50″N 4°54′58.20″E

- Hogeschool van Amsterdam
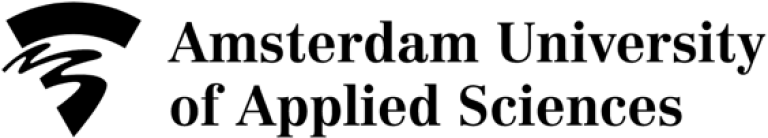
- Motto: Creating Tomorrow
- Established: 1993
- Affiliations: University of Amsterdam, NIBS, Erasmus+, UASNL
- Rector: Dr. G.R. Meijer
- Administrative staff: 3,200
- Students: 43,000
- Location: Amsterdam, Netherlands
- Colours: AUAS-purple, black & white
- Website: www.amsterdamuas.com

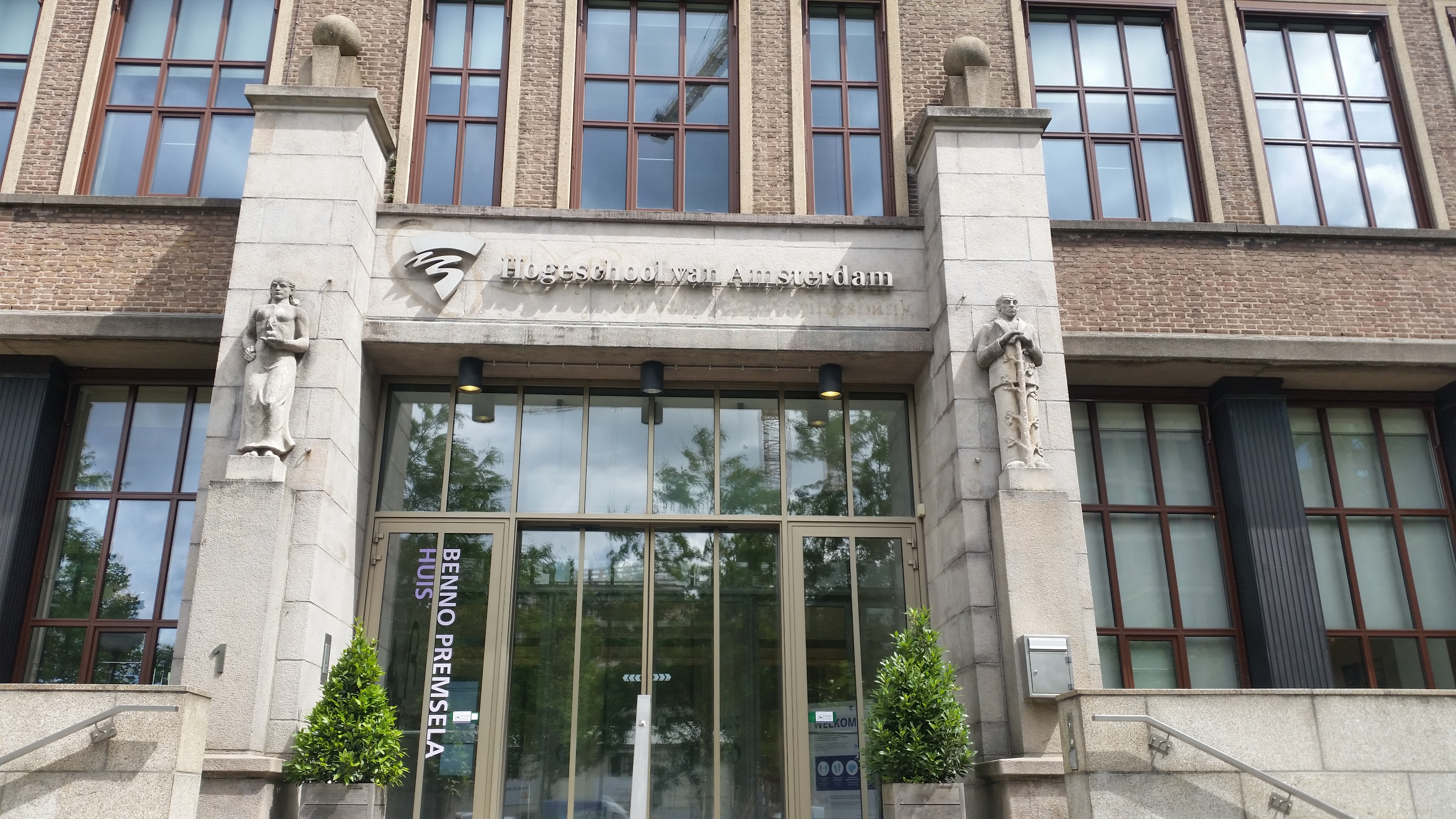
The Benno Premsela building of the university

Amsterdam University of Applied Sciences (abbreviated as: AUAS; Dutch: Hogeschool van Amsterdam) is a large vocational university located in Amsterdam, Netherlands. The AUAS offers bachelor programmes, and a number of (professional) master programmes. It is also possible for students from the AUAS's international partner institutes to study at the AUAS as exchange students.

The AUAS offers eighty courses of study, spread across locations in Amsterdam. The university maintains ties with the University of Amsterdam. The 2,300 employees of the AUAS serve more than 40,000 students.

An important way of learning for AUAS students is via work placements. All students have a practical work period in order to get on-the-job experience in their chosen field of study. Such work placements can be at a company or organisation in the Netherlands or abroad. Most of the teaching at the AUAS is organised in modules, which are given in four periods of ten weeks, or in two semesters.

== Training ==
The AUAS has 90 college programmes divided and grouped into seven 'domains' (faculties).

23 of these programmes are accredited by the NVAO. Besides full-time programmes, the college also has some part-time courses.

Programs classified into Domain:

Exercise, Sports and Nutrition

- Physical education
- Sport, Management and Entrepreneurship
- Nutrition and Dietetics

Economics and Management

- Accountancy
- Business Informatics
- Commercial Economy
- Business Economics for Future Entrepreneurs
- Communications
- Financial Services Management
- Fiscal Economics
- Human Resource Management
- International Management (English)
- International Business and Languages (English and International)
- International Business and Management Studies (international and English)
- Logistics and Economics
- Management, Economics and Law
- Management in Health Care and Social Services
- Small Business and Retail Management
- Sports Marketing
- Trade Management Asia (English)

Health

- Nursing
- Social Psychiatric Nurse
- Occupational Therapy
- Physiotherapy
- Exercise
- European Master of Science in Occupational Therapy (international and English)
- European School of Physiotherapy (international and English)
- Master Evidence Based Practice

Social Work and Law

- Social Work and Community Services
- Cultural and Social Education
- Social Educational Care Work
- Legal Studies
- Social Legal Studies
- Applied Psychology
- Public Management

Digital Media and Creative Industry

- Fashion & Branding (also in English version)
- Fashion and Design (also in English version)
- Fashion & Management (in English version)
- Computer Engineering
- Software Engineering
- Cyber Security
- Business IT & Management
- Game Development
- Communication & Multimedia Design
- Media, Information and Communication
- Digital Design

Education and Parenting

- Higher Education Executive training
- PABO (Primary school teacher)
- Pedagogy
- International Degree in English and Education (international and English)
- Geography Teacher
- Biology Teacher
- Architecture Teacher
- Building Technology Teacher
- Consumption Technology Teacher
- Economics Teacher
- Electrical teacher
- English teacher
- French Teacher
- History Teacher
- Teacher Health and Welfare
- Teacher Grafimedia
- Social Studies Teacher
- Teacher Mechanical Engineering
- Automotive Technology Teacher
- Teacher Physics-Chemistry
- Dutch teacher
- Teacher Education
- Teacher Technology
- Mechanical Teacher
- Mathematics Teacher
- Master Teacher of Economics
- Master English Teacher
- French Master Teacher
- Master Teacher History
- Dutch Master Teacher
- Master Mathematics Teacher
- Primary Teacher

Technology

- Aviation Studies
- Aviation Engineering
- Aviation Logistics
- Business Mathematics
- Engineering
- Structural Business (Property Studies)
- Business Logistics
- Civil Engineering
- E-technology
- Engineering, Design and Innovation
- Forensic Investigation
- Human Logistics
- Maritime Officer
- Entrepreneurship, Innovation and Technology
- Product Design
- Industrial Engineering

== Ranking ==
The HBO Selection Guide (Dutch: HBO-Keuzegids) gives annual independent judgements on college rankings in The Netherlands.

== Student union ==
AUAS students are represented by ASVA Student Union (Dutch: ASVA Studentenvakbond).

== Amsterdam Fashion Institute (AMFI) ==
The Amsterdam Fashion Institute is part of the Faculty of Digital Media and Creative Industry (abbreviated as: FDMCI; Dutch: Faculteit Digitale Media en Creatieve Industrie) at the Amsterdam University of Applied Sciences.

=== Criticism ===
On the 30th of May 2023 the Inspectorate of Education (Dutch: Inspectie van het Onderwijs) published the results of their investigation into social safety at the fashion institute.

This investigation was instigated when in 2021 former and current students complained en masse that the learning environment at AMFI was unsafe. Jan Willem van Roodenberg of the Education Inspectorate (Dutch: Onderwijsinspectie) stated to local media: "The severity, the extent of the pattern of a completely unsafe situation that is emerging: as an inspector of higher education, I am extremely shocked by this." In the same year, ASVA Student Union demanded the resignation of the Director and the Head of Design. This was followed by parliamentary questions brought forward by René Peters (CDA) to the then Minister for Education, Culture and Science Ingrid van Engelshoven.

== Amsterdam School of International Business (AMSIB) ==
The Amsterdam School of International Business is part of the Faculty of Business and Economics (Dutch: Faculteit Business en Economie) at the Amsterdam University of Applied Sciences.

In 2023 the school had 2,800 students and 150 employees.

== European School of Physiotherapy (ESP) ==
The European School of Physiotherapy is part of the Faculty of Health (Dutch: Faculteit Gezondheid) at the Amsterdam University of Applied Sciences.
