= The Landmarks of Tomorrow =

1959 book by Peter Drucker

- Author: Peter Drucker
- Language: English
- Publisher: Heineman
- Publication date: 1959
- Publication place: Canada
- Pages: 204
- OCLC: 387964

The Landmarks of Tomorrow is a book by Peter Drucker which appeared in 1959. It describes a change in society which took place between 1937 and 1957, whereby the precepts of the Cartesian worldview no longer hold sway. Cause is no longer the central concept in understanding the world, but rather pattern, purpose and process. He described this as the post modern world.

It is the source of the concept "knowledge worker".
