= Feminine style of management =

The feminine style of management is a management style generally characterized by more feminine quality soft skills and behaviors such as empathy, effective communication, and a generally more democratic or team-styled work environment. The style is a growing trend within businesses and is characterized by a form of transformational leadership style. The feminine style of management, although characterized by traits commonly labeled as feminine, is not a style of management that is only used by females; it is also a style which has been found beneficial for particular types of businesses and organizations.

== Historical development ==
=== Early 1900s ===
Beginning with textile mills and the shoe-making industry of post-revolutionary America, the first real explosion of women in a general workforce, whether at home or manufacturing, came at the turn of the century. In World War I, many women entered the workforce as a high population of men served in the war. As men returned from the war and a falling economy led to the Great Depression, women suffered displacement. During World War II, there was a similar growth of women in business that had been previously reserved for men. The combination of a better economy and changing social norms led many women's roles and functions in business to steadily increase following World War II.

=== 1970s–1980s ===
In the 1970s, feminist authors denied or minimized the differences between men and women to establish that women had similar talents to men and should have equal labor opportunities. In Schutlz v. Wheaton Glass Co., a U.S. Court of Appeals ruled that jobs held by men must be "substantially equal" but not "identical" to fall under the protection of the Equal Pay Act, and that it is therefore illegal for employers to change the job titles of women workers in order to pay them less than men.

However, as the 1980s began, differences were more emphasized and noted as a means of progression due to the management style differences that came of feminine values and ways of behaving, feeling, and thinking.

=== Since 1990 ===
In 1991, women represented 45% of all managerial positions. Currently, although the feminine management style can be found being utilized throughout organizations internationally, barriers to acceptance of this management style include stereotypes, mentoring and networking availability, workplace discrimination, family related issues, and funding availability. However, the rise in female leaders is a result of changing theories and practices of leadership.

== Gendered organizations ==
Reasons a systematic theory of gender and organizations is necessary:

1. The gender segregation of work, including divisions between paid and unpaid work, is partly created through organizational practices.
2. Related to gender segregation, income and status inequality between women and men is also partly created in organizational processes; understanding these processes is necessary for understanding gender inequality.
3. Organizations are one arena in which widely disseminated cultural images of gender are invented and reproduced. Knowledge of cultural productions is important for understanding gender construction.
4. Some aspects of individual gender identity, perhaps particularly masculinity, are also products of organizational processes and pressures.
5. An important feminist project is to make large-scale organizations more democratic and more supportive of humane goals.

=== Gendering interaction processes ===
In addition to the above reasons, Acker adds that it is necessary to examine feminine styles of management within theories of gendered organizations because gendering occurs in at least five different interacting processes.

- First, the construction of divisions along lines of gender-division of labor, of allowed behaviors, of locations in physical space, and of power, including the institutionalized means of maintaining the divisions in the structures of labor markets, the family, and the state.
- Second, the construction of symbols and images that explain, express, reinforce, or sometimes oppose those divisions.
- Third, interactions between women and men, women and women, and men and men, including all those patterns that enact dominance and submission.
- Fourth, processes help to produce gendered components of individual identity, which may include consciousness of the existence of the other three aspects of gender, such as, in organizations, choice of appropriate work, language use, clothing, and presentation of self as a gendered member of an organization.
- Finally, gender is implicated in the fundamental, ongoing processes of creating and conceptualizing social structures.

== Characteristics ==
=== Types of management ===
Within the three main types of managerial styles, studies have examined differences in masculine and feminine styles. The first is the task management style, or how much a leader initiates, organizes, and/or defines work activities and processes. The second style, an interpersonal based style, is a style where the leader builds morale, relationships, satisfaction, and commitment in the organization. Lastly, the third is the group decision making style, where the leader encourages a participative, democratic approach

=== Feminine style characteristics ===
Some studies find differences between male and female task accomplishment styles and interpersonal styles. Males tended to be more task-oriented, while females tended to be more relationship-oriented. These differences, however, have been observed only in men and women subjects of laboratory experiments, that is, people asked to speculate how they would behave if they were leaders. Management has traditionally been male dominated and constructed in masculine terms. Present ideas involving femininity in management include transforming places of work into relation-oriented, flexible, and humane institutions.

Differences disappear in studies where actual managers are compared: most conclude that women do not behave differently from men in the same or similar kind of leadership position. Moreover, experienced women managers show no differences in leadership abilities from experienced male managers. These women, in fact, are likely to more closely resemble their male counterparts in drive, skills, temperament, and competitiveness, than the average woman in the population. Anne Cummings stated, ""The notion of what makes an effective leader is changing, and you will find both [traditionally defined] 'masculine' and 'feminine' components." In order for women to make an impact within an organization as an executive, they need to be aware of their leadership styles and strengths.

== Examples ==
=== Examples in research ===
In 1990, Alice Eagly and Johnson conducted a study on gender and leadership and found results they later emphasized with supporting meta-analysis data. Specifically, in 1992 and 1995, researchers Eagly and Johnson also conducted meta-analysis on the effectiveness and evaluation, respectively, of differing management styles. The results showed that the main difference in management styles in men and women were that women are more democratic, while men were found to generally be more autocratic. However, the studies show little evidence that would suggest males and females differ in their leadership effectiveness. This means that women tend to be more focused on encouraging participation and involving their workforce in business decisions, while men are more focused on encouraging performance and driving towards tangible production.

In 2003, a meta-analysis was conducted by Eagly, Johannesen-Schmidt, and Van Engen that compared male and female managers on measures of transformational, transactional, and laissez-faire leadership styles; their findings emphasized the results of their previous study. The meta-analysis study showed that women were slightly more likely than men to exercise a transformational leadership style.

This is a style of management that is likely to be used by coaches, teachers, and other individuals focused on developing subordinates. The transformational leadership encourages participation and creative problem solving. Eagly proposes that the transformational style of management is likely more advantageous for women to employ however. Men were shown to be more likely to critique their employees and be less interactive, in contrast to the women who utilized a more "hands-on" approach.

In contrast, research in the past few decades shows that these results are only averages. Men and Women do not show a significant difference in these management styles, only slight differences. Some men proved to use more feminine styles, while some women proved to use more masculine styles. Eagly states that "the sex differences are small because the leader role itself carries a lot of weight in determining people's behavior."

In 2005, a year-long study conducted by Caliper, a Princeton, New Jersey–based management consulting firm, and Aurora, a London-based organization that advances women, identified a number of characteristics that distinguish women leaders from men when it comes to qualities of leadership:

"Women leaders are more assertive and persuasive, have a stronger need to get things done and are more willing to take risks than male leaders....Women leaders were also found to be more empathetic and flexible, as well as stronger in interpersonal skills than their male counterparts....enabling them to read situations accurately and take information in from all sides....These women leaders are able to bring others around to their point of view....because they genuinely understand and care about where others are coming from....so that the people they are leading feel more understood, supported and valued."

These findings were summarized into four specific statements about women's leadership qualities: "(1) Women leaders are more persuasive than their male counterparts, (2) When feeling the sting of rejection, women leaders learn from adversity and carry on with an 'I'll show you' attitude, (3) Women leaders demonstrate an inclusive, team-building leadership style of problem solving and decision making, (4) Women leaders are more likely to ignore rules and take risks."

BET's CEO, Debra L. Lee, explains that it is easy to generalize the differences in gender leadership styles as "women do it this way, and men do it that way." Instead of simply generalizing, Debra Lee asserts that it is important to discuss these differences so that women don't feel uncomfortable managing differently from men. During this interview, she further states that we should encourage young women to climb the corporate ladder. Lee explained that her hardest lesson was learning to follow her gut when others challenged it, but that lesson has truly paid off. She insists that we encourage young women to do the same.

It's vital for women to embrace these differences. During a 2006 speech given by Dr. Musimbi Kanyoro, the World YWCA Secretary General, she explained that the attitudes toward leadership are changing and what women offer is essential. She stated: "Domination as a leadership style is becoming less and less popular. There is a new growing appreciation of....those traits that women use to keep families together and to organize volunteers to unite and make change in the shared life of communities. These newly admired leadership qualities of shared leadership; nurturance and doing good for others are today not only sought after but also indeed needed to make a difference in the world....A feminine way of leading includes helping the world to understand and be principled about values that really matter."

=== Recent examples in global society ===
More and more female leaders are found within society today. In addition to the thousands of women who now receive graduate and doctoral degrees, many hold managerial positions within companies, and females hold 45% of all managerial posts.

Today, many nonprofit organizations take a feminine style of leadership approach when handling employees. These particular organizations tend to encourage participation among group members, show flexibility, and maintain a non-hierarchical work environment.

Leaders that take on this style tend to show genuine care and understanding towards their employees. The empathy they have for others enables their employees to feel recognized and valued within the organization. These leaders are also known for their communication skills and tendency to listen to multiple perspective before making decisions. Their desire to use team-building activities creates a sense of community within organizations, which in turn helps to meet overall goals. An example of a company using team-building, genuinely understand its employees needs, and embracing femininity is Mary Kay Cosmetics. This company strives to treat employees as individuals and help them reach their personal goals. When employees meet particular sales goals they are rewarded with things they desire, such as pink Cadillacs and diamonds. These actions show employees that they are valued and understood, which leads to a positive corporate culture.

Sung-Joo Kim, chairman and chief executive of luxury-goods company MCM Worldwide, is an example of a woman using the feminine style of management to help successfully run a company. Kim's sensitivity and openness towards employees gives her an advantage over other luxury-good corporations. Kim has to find a balance between her sensitivity and still maintaining order and a level of toughness. Kim grew up in a patriarchal Korean household and her experiences led her to strive to prove to others that femininity and power are not mutually exclusive and it is quite possible to be a nurturing woman and still run a successful business.

According to Esther Wachs Book, "A new breed of leader is emerging, and that breed is female." She contends that women, such as Meg Whitman of eBay and Marcy Carsey of Carsey-Werner, succeed because they embody seven uniquely female abilities: they can sell their visions; they are not afraid to reinvent the rules; they are focused on achievement; they show courage under fire; they turn challenges into opportunities; they are aware of customer preferences; and they maximize what Book calls "high touch" in an era of high tech.

== See also ==
- Collaboration
- Management styles
- http://www.guide2womenleaders.com/
