= Knowledge worker =

Worker whose main capital is knowledge

A knowledge worker is a worker whose main capital is their knowledge and expertise. Examples of such professionals include ICT professionals, physicians, pharmacists, architects, engineers, mathematicians, scientists, designers, public accountants, lawyers, librarians, archivists, editors, and academics, whose job is to "think for a living".

== Definition ==
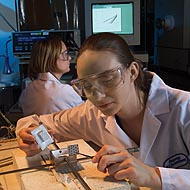
Knowledge workers must employ a combination of convergent and divergent thinking as part of their work.

Knowledge work can be differentiated from other forms of work by its emphasis on "non-routine" problem solving that requires a combination of convergent and divergent thinking. But despite the amount of research and literature on knowledge work, there is no succinct definition of the term.

Mosco and McKercher (2007) outline various viewpoints on the matter. They first point to the most narrow and defined definition of knowledge work, such as Florida's view of it as specifically, "the direct manipulation of symbols to create an original knowledge product, or to add obvious value to an existing one", which limits the definition of knowledge work to mainly creative work. They then contrast this view of knowledge work with the notably broader view which includes the handling and distribution of information, arguing that workers who play a role in the handling and distribution of information add real value to the field, despite not necessarily contributing a creative element. Thirdly, one might consider a definition of knowledge work which includes, "all workers involved in the chain of producing and distributing knowledge products", which allows for a very broad and inclusive categorization of knowledge workers. It should thus be acknowledged that the term "knowledge worker" can be quite broad in its meaning, and is not always definitive in who it refers to.

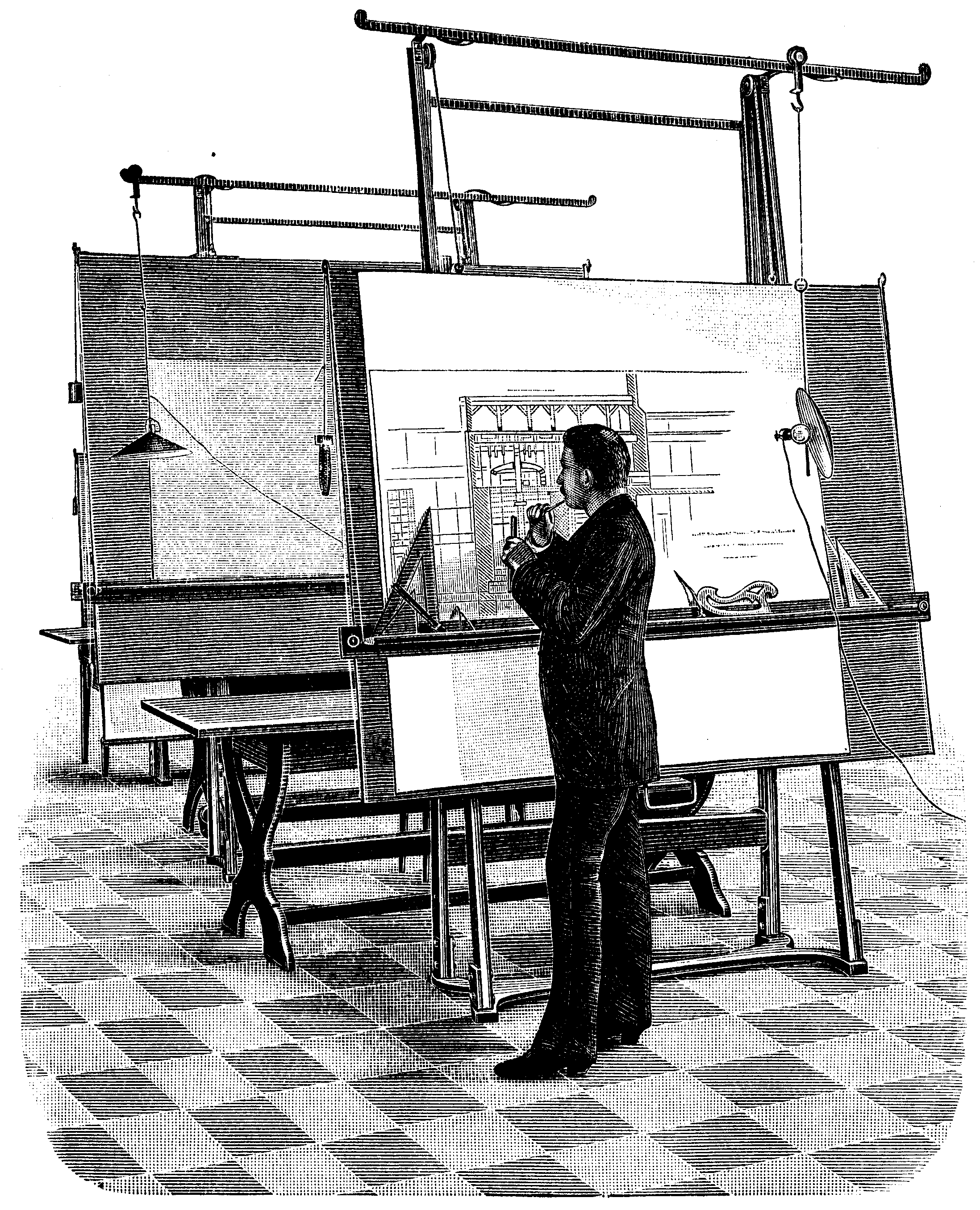
An architect is an example of a typical "knowledge worker".

Knowledge workers spend a portion of their time searching for information. They are also often displaced from their bosses, working in various departments and time zones or from remote sites such as home offices and airport lounges. As businesses increase their dependence on information technology, the number of fields in which knowledge workers must operate has expanded dramatically.

Even though they sometimes are called "gold collars", because of their high salaries, as well as because of their relative independence in controlling the process of their own work, current research shows that they are also more prone to burnout and very close normative control from organizations they work for, unlike regular workers.

Managing knowledge workers can be a difficult task. Most knowledge workers prefer some level of autonomy, and do not like being overseen or managed. Those who manage knowledge workers are often knowledge workers themselves, or have been in the past. Projects must be carefully considered before assigning to a knowledge worker, as their interest and goals will affect the quality of the completed project. Knowledge workers must be treated as individuals.

Loo (2017) using empirical findings from knowledge workers of two sectors – advertising and IT software sectors – and from three developed countries – England, Japan and Singapore – investigated a specific type of knowledge workers – the creative knowledge workers - as opposed to the generic ones as indicated above. The findings from the analysed empirical data offer a complex picture of this type of work in the knowledge economy where workers use a combination of creativity, abilities, talents, skills, and knowledge towards the eventual production of products and services.

This investigation identified a definition of creative knowledge work from four specific roles of copywriting, creative directing, software programming, and systems programme managing in advertising and IT software. The manner in which each of the creative applications is applied is dependent on the role(s) of the creative workers. This type of work includes a complex combination of skill sets or 'creative knowledge work (ckw) capacities'. "Creative knowledge workers use a combination of creative applications to perform their functions/roles in the knowledge economy including anticipatory imagination, problem solving, problem seeking, and generating ideas and aesthetic sensibilities".

Taking aesthetic sensibility as an example, for a creative director, it is a visual imagery whether still or moving via a camera lens and for a software programmer, it is the innovative technical expertise in which the software is written.

Other sector-related creative applications include an emotional connection in the advertising sector and the power of expression and sensitivity in the IT software sector. Terms such as 'general sponge', 'social chameleon', and 'in tune with the zeitgeist' were identified which the creative knowledge workers used to identify emotionally with their potential audience in ad making. From the IT software perspective, creative knowledge workers used a 'sensitivity' creative application to ascertain business intelligence and as a measurement of information, the software worker might obtain from various parties.

Creative workers also require abilities and aptitudes. Passion for one's job was generic to the roles investigated in the two sectors and for copywriters, this passion was identified with fun, enjoyment, and happiness in carrying out the role alongside attributes such as honesty (regarding the product), confidence, and patience in finding the appropriate copy. As with the other roles, a creative worker in software programming requires team working and interpersonal skills in order to communicate effectively with those from other disciplinary backgrounds and training. As regards the managerial roles of creative directing and systems programme managing, the abilities to create a vision for the job in hand, to convince, strategize, execute, and plan towards the eventual completion of the given task (such as a campaign or a software) are necessary capacities.

Linking these abilities and capacities are collaborative ways of working, which the findings from this study have identified. The two modes of working ranged from individual to collaborative where a worker might be doing either or both depending on the specific activity. The abilities to traverse between these two work modes alongside the relevant creative application are part of the complexity of this style of working.

Creative workers also require an understanding of various forms of knowledge. These are related to disciplines such as those from the humanities (e.g., literature), and the creative arts such as painting and music (e.g., popular and classical varieties). Creative knowledge workers also require technical-related knowledge such as mathematics and computer sciences (e.g., software engineering) and physical sciences (e.g., physics) though there are distinctions in the two sectors. In the IT software sector, technical knowledge of software languages is especially significant for programmers as ascertained in the findings. However, the degree of technical expertise may be less for a programme manager, as only knowledge of the relevant software language is necessary to understand the issues for communicating with the team of developers and testers. The technical know-how for a creative director relates only to the understanding of the possibilities of technologies (such as graphics and typography) in order to capitalise on the technical wizardry. The technical specialists are then required to execute the creative director's vision.

The above types of disciplinary knowledge may appear in explicit formats, which can be learnt from formal programmes at teaching institutions such as higher education and professional institutions alongside other skills and abilities relating to presentation, communication, and team working. As ascertained in the findings, there was other non-disciplinary knowledge, which was not explicit but tacit in nature. Interviewees mentioned tacit experiences from their past work and life experiences, which they used to draw upon in performing their creative knowledge work. This form of knowledge was harnessed collectively as a team (of an advertising campaign or a software programme). This collaborative approach to working, especially with roles such as creative directing and software programme managing, requires tacit knowledge of the strengths and weaknesses and the needs and wants of the related team members (knowledge of psychology). This form of working may occur within the organisation, as a stand-alone group for a specific project in the organisation, or as a sub-contracted team outside the organisation. Within this role, creative knowledge workers may perform their activities individually and/or collectively as part of their contribution to the project. The findings also brought out some characteristics of collaborative working such as the varieties of stakeholders such as sub-contracted groups, and the indirect relationships between clients, workers (of an ad agency), and consumers.

A more recent approach to the definitional problem was proposed by De Sordi and colleagues (2021), who analyzed 223 academic articles published between 2001 and 2019 to identify inaccuracies in the use of the term. The researchers proposed a distinction based on the mechanisms of "exploration" and "exploitation" derived from organizational innovation theory:

The term knowledge worker applies to professionals whose work is highlighted by the continuous, systematic and predominant expansion of organizational knowledge through the mechanism of exploration. This sets knowledge workers apart from other workers, who deal with existing knowledge (information workers) and whose tasks predominantly involve the exploitation of organizational knowledge.

According to this framework, knowledge workers are characterized by experimentation, discovery and innovation activities, while information workers focus on implementation, application and efficiency in the use of existing knowledge.

== History ==
The term 'knowledge work' appeared in The Landmarks of Tomorrow (1959) by Peter Drucker. Drucker later coined the term 'knowledge worker' in The Effective Executive in 1966. Later, in 1999, he suggested that "the most valuable asset of a 21st-century institution, whether business or non-business, will be its knowledge workers and their productivity."

Paul Alfred Weiss (1960) said that "knowledge grows like organisms, with data serving as food to be assimilated rather than merely stored". Popper (1963) stated there is always an increasing need for knowledge to grow and progress continually, whether tacit (Polanyi, 1976) or explicit.

Toffler (1990) observed that typical knowledge workers (especially R&D scientists and engineers) in the age of knowledge economy must have some system at their disposal to create, process and enhance their own knowledge. In some cases they would also need to manage the knowledge of their co-workers.

Nonaka (1991) described knowledge as the fuel for innovation, but was concerned that many managers failed to understand how knowledge could be leveraged. Companies are more like living organisms than machines, he argued, and most viewed knowledge as a static input to the corporate machine. Nonaka advocated a view of knowledge as renewable and changing, and that knowledge workers were the agents for that change. Knowledge-creating companies, he believed, should be focused primarily on the task of innovation.

This laid the foundation for the new practice of knowledge management, or "KM", which evolved in the 1990s to support knowledge workers with standard tools and processes.

Savage (1995) describes a knowledge-focus as the third wave of human socio-economic development. The first wave was the Agricultural Age with wealth defined as ownership of land. In the second wave, the Industrial Age, wealth was based on ownership of Capital, i.e. factories. In the Knowledge Age, wealth is based upon the ownership of knowledge and the ability to use that knowledge to create or improve goods and services. Product improvements include cost, durability, suitability, timeliness of delivery, and security. Using data, in the Knowledge Age, 2% of the working population will work on the land, 10% will work in Industry and the rest will be knowledge workers.

=== 21st century ===
Davenport (2005) says that the rise of knowledge work has actually been foreseen for years. He points to the fact that Fritz Machlup did a lot of the early work on both knowledge as well as knowledge work roles and as early as 1958 stated that the sector was growing much faster than the rest of the economy with knowledge workers making up almost a third of the workforce in the United States. "According to the Organization for Economic Co-operation and Development (1981), by the beginning of the 1970s around 40 percent of the working population in the USA and Canada were classified to the information sector, whereas in most other OECD countries the figures were still considerably lower."

As of 2016, an average of 1.9 million knowledge worker positions had been added every year since 1980, more than any other type of role.

Tapscott (2006) sees a strong, on-going linkage between knowledge workers and innovation, but the pace and manner of interaction have become more advanced. He describes social media tools on the internet that now drive more powerful forms of collaboration. Knowledge workers engage in peer-to-peer knowledge sharing across organizational and company boundaries, forming networks of expertise. Some of these are open to the public. While he echoes concern over copyright and intellectual property law being challenged in the marketplace, he feels strongly that businesses must engage in collaboration to survive. He sees on-going alliance of public (government) and private (commercial) teams to solve problems, referencing the open source Linux operating system along with the Human Genome Project as examples where knowledge is being freely exchanged, with commercial value being realized.

Palmer (2014) researched knowledge worker productivity and work patterns. Part of this research has involved the analysis of how an average knowledge worker spends their day. He notes that effective and efficient knowledge work relies on the smooth navigation of unstructured processes and the elaboration of custom and one-off procedures. "As we move to the 21st century business model, the focus must be on equipping knowledge workers with tools and infrastructure that enable communication and information sharing, such as networking, e-mail, content management and increasingly, social media." Palmer points to the emergence of Adaptive Case Management (also known as Dynamic or Advanced case management) representing the paradigm shift triggered by the appearance from adapting business practices to the design of IT systems, to building systems that reflect how work is actually performed.

Due to the rapid global expansion of information-based transactions and interactions being conducted via the Internet, there has been an ever-increasing demand for a workforce that is capable of performing these activities. Knowledge Workers are now estimated to outnumber all other workers in North America by at least a four to one margin.

While knowledge worker roles overlap heavily with professions that require college degrees, the comprehensive nature of knowledge work in today's connected workplace requires virtually all workers to obtain these skills at some level. To that end, the public education and community college systems have become increasingly focused on lifelong learning to ensure students receive skills necessary to be productive knowledge workers in the 21st century.

Many of the knowledge workers currently entering the workforce are from the generation X demographic. These new knowledge workers value lifelong learning over lifelong employment. "They seek employability over employment [and] value career over self-reliance" (Elsdon and Iyer, 1999) Where baby boomers are proficient in specified knowledge regarding a specific firm, generation X knowledge workers acquire knowledge from many firms and take that knowledge with them from company to company.

== Roles ==
Knowledge workers bring benefits to organizations in a variety of ways. These include:

- analyzing data to establish relationships
- assessing input in order to evaluate complex or conflicting priorities
- identifying and understanding trends
- making connections
- understanding cause and effect
- ability to brainstorm, thinking broadly (divergent thinking)
- ability to drill down, creating more focus (convergent thinking)
- producing a new capability
- creating or modifying a strategy

These knowledge worker contributions are in contrast with activities that they would typically not be asked to perform, including:

- transaction processing
- routine tasks
- simple prioritization of work

There is a set of transitional tasks which include roles that are seemingly routine, but that require deeper technology, product, or customer knowledge to fulfill the function. These include:

- providing technical or customer support
- handling unique customer issues
- addressing open-ended inquiries

Generally, if the knowledge can be retained, knowledge worker contributions will serve to expand the knowledge assets of a company. While it can be difficult to measure, this increases the overall value of its intellectual capital. In cases where the knowledge assets have commercial or monetary value, companies may create patents around their assets, at which point the material becomes restricted intellectual property. In these knowledge-intensive situations, knowledge workers play a direct, vital role in increasing the financial value of a company. They can do this by finding solutions on how they can find new ways to make profits. This can also be related with market and research. Davenport (2005) says that even if knowledge workers are not a majority of all workers, they do have the most influence on their economies. He adds that companies with a high volume of knowledge workers are the most successful and fastest growing in leading economies including the United States.

Reinhardt et al.'s (2011) review of current literature shows that the roles of knowledge workers across the workforce are incredibly diverse. In two empirical studies they have "proposed a new way of classifying the roles of knowledge workers and the knowledge actions they perform during their daily work." The typology of knowledge worker roles suggested by them are "controller, helper, learner, linker, networker, organizer, retriever, sharer, solver, and tracker":

Role	Description	Typical knowledge actions (expected)	Existence of the role in literature
Controller	People who monitor the organizational performance based on raw information.	Analyze, dissemination, information organization, monitoring	(Moore and Rugullies, 2005) (Geisler, 2007)
Helper	People who transfer information to teach others, once they passed a problem.	Authoring, analyze, dissemination, feedback, information search, learning, networking	(Davenport and Prusak, 1998)
Learner	People who use information and practices to improve personal skills and competence.	Acquisition, analyze, expert search, information search, learning, service search	
Linker	People who associate and mash up information from different sources to generate new information.	Analyze, dissemination, information search, information organization, networking	(Davenport and Prusak, 1998) (Nonaka and Takeuchi, 1995) (Geisler, 2007)
Networker	People who create personal or project related connections with people involved in the same kind of work, to share information and support each other.	Analyze, dissemination, expert search, monitoring, networking, service search	(Davenport and Prusak, 1998) (Nonaka and Takeuchi, 1995) (Geisler, 2007)
Organizer	People who are involved in personal or organizational planning of activities, e.g. to-do lists and scheduling.	Analyze, information organization, monitoring, networking	(Moore and Rugullies, 2005)
Retriever	People who search and collect information on a given topic.	Acquisition, analyze, expert search, information search, information organization, monitoring	(Snyder-Halpern et al., 2001)
Sharer	People who disseminate information in a community.	Authoring, co-authoring, dissemination, networking	(Davenport and Prusak, 1998) (Brown et al., 2002) (Geisler, 2007)
Solver	People who find or provide a way to deal with a problem.	Acquisition, analyze, dissemination, information search, learning, service search	(Davenport and Prusak, 1998) (Nonaka and Takeuchi, 1995) (Moore and Rugullies, 2005)
Tracker	People who monitor and react on personal and organizational actions that may become problems.	Analyze, information search, monitoring, networking	(Moore and Rugullies, 2005)

== Additional context and frameworks ==
Drucker (1966) defines six factors for knowledge worker productivity:

1. Knowledge worker productivity demands that we ask the question: "What is the task?"
2. It demands that we impose the responsibility for their productivity on the individual knowledge workers themselves. Knowledge workers have to manage themselves.
3. Continuing innovation has to be part of the work, the task and the responsibility of knowledge workers.
4. Knowledge work requires continuous learning on the part of the knowledge worker, but equally continuous teaching on the part of the knowledge worker.
5. Productivity of the knowledge worker is not — at least not primarily — a matter of the quantity of output. Quality is at least as important.
6. Finally, knowledge worker productivity requires that the knowledge worker is both seen and treated as an "asset" rather than a "cost." It requires that knowledge workers want to work for the organization in preference to all other opportunities.

The theory of Human Interaction Management asserts that there are 5 principles characterizing effective knowledge work:

1. Build effective teams
2. Communicate in a structured way
3. Create, share and maintain knowledge
4. Align your time with strategic goals
5. Negotiate next steps as you work

Another, more recent breakdown of knowledge work (author unknown) shows activity that ranges from tasks performed by individual knowledge workers to global social networks. This framework spans every class of knowledge work that is being or is likely to be undertaken. There are seven levels or scales of knowledge work, with references for each are cited.

1. Knowledge work (e.g., writing, analyzing, advising) is performed by subject-matter specialists in all areas of an organization. Although knowledge work began with the origins of writing and counting, it was first identified as a category of work by Drucker (1973).
2. Knowledge functions (e.g., capturing, organizing, and providing access to knowledge) are performed by technical staff, to support knowledge processes projects. Knowledge functions date from c. 450 BC, with the Library of Alexandria, but their modern roots can be linked to the emergence of information management in the 1970s.
3. Knowledge processes (preserving, sharing, integration) are performed by professional groups, as part of a knowledge management program. Knowledge processes have evolved in concert with general-purpose technologies, such as the printing press, mail delivery, the telegraph, telephone networks, and the Internet.
4. Knowledge management programs link the generation of knowledge (e.g., from science, synthesis, or learning) with its use (e.g., policy analysis, reporting, program management) as well as facilitating organizational learning and adaptation in a knowledge organization. Knowledge management emerged as a discipline in the 1990s (Leonard, 1995).
5. Knowledge organizations transfer outputs (content, products, services, and solutions), in the form of knowledge services, to enable external use. The concept of knowledge organizations emerged in the 1990s.
6. Knowledge services support other organizational services, yield sector outcomes, and result in benefits for citizens in the context of knowledge markets. Knowledge services emerged as a subject in the 2000s.
7. Social media networks enable knowledge organizations to co-produce knowledge outputs by leveraging their internal capacity with massive social networks. Social networking emerged in the 2000s.

The hierarchy ranges from the effort of individual specialists, through technical activity, professional projects, and management programs, to organizational strategy, knowledge markets, and global-scale networking.

This framework is useful for positioning the myriad types of knowledge work relative to each other and within the context of organizations, markets, and the global knowledge economy. It also provides a useful context for planning, developing, and implementing knowledge management projects.

Loo (2017) investigates how a particular group - creative knowledge workers – carries out their jobs and learns within it. Using empirical data from advertising and software development in England, Japan and Singapore, it develops a new conceptual framework to analyse the complexities of creative knowledge work. The framework draws from four disciplines of business and management, economics, sociology and psychology. Focusing uniquely on the human element of working in the knowledge economy, Loo explores the real world of how people work in this emerging phenomenon and examines the relationships between knowledge and creative dimensions to provide new frameworks for learning and working. This research identified three levels of creative knowledge applications. They relate to intra-sectoral approaches, inter-sectoral approaches (where jobs require different styles of work depending on the sectors), and changes in culture/practices in the sectors. With the intra-sectoral work, they refer to the roles and functions of specific jobs in each of the two sectors of advertising (e.g. copywriting and creative directing) and software development (e.g. software developing and software programme managing).

With the inter-sectoral work, it may include software programme managers having different functions when working in different organisations – e.g. a computer software company and a multinational financial organisation. With the last type of creative working, it may include aspects such as the culture of 'good practice' in technical problem-solving and the 'power of expression' in software programming. All the three types of micro-level of creative knowledge work offer a highly contextualized understanding of how these workers operate in the knowledge economy. This approach is different from that taken by Zuboff (1988), Drucker (1993), Nonaka and Takeuchi (1995) and Reich (2001) who sought to provide a more generic understanding.

Finally, complex creative knowledge work needs a supportive environment. One such environment relates to the supporting technical base. Based on the findings, information, communications and electronic technologies (ICET) are viewed as an organisational tool, a source of ideas (such as the Internet), and a way of modelling a concept. It may also be applied to inter-sectoral activities such as software for cross-disciplinary applications. This organisational tool enables creative knowledge workers to devote their energies to multi-faceted activities such as analysis of huge data sets and the enabling of new jobs such as webpage designing. ICET enables workers to spend more time on advanced activities, which leads to the intensification of creative applications. Lastly, it was noted from the findings that a supportive environment focused on training, work environment, and education.

== See also ==
- Customer knowledge
- Explicit knowledge
- Information industry
- Knowledge capture
- Knowledge economy
- Knowledge management
- Knowledge market
- Knowledge organization
- Knowledge tagging
- Knowledge transfer
- Knowledge value chain
- Learning
- Library science
- Lifelong learning
- Management consulting
- New Knowledge Worker of Korea
- Personal knowledge management
- Social information processing
- Systems thinking
- Tacit knowledge
- Workforce
