= CEO succession =

CEO succession is the process by which boards of directors of an organization ensure that it can transition to a new CEO when their existing CEO retires or can no longer carry out their CEO position. It is a part of succession planning to ensure continuity in leadership from one person to the next holding the CEO position.

== Commercial importance ==
CEO succession is one of key functions of a board of directors. Changing the head of an enterprise impacts company culture, board/CEO relations, and perceptions from multiple constituencies inside and outside the business. The disruption that occurs can impact performance in a positive, neutral or negative manner. Successful companies manage this process well in advance with a concerted set of processes and milestones. Effective CEO succession requires a well-defined program that ensures a supply of highly capable candidates ready to assume the CEO position whether through an unexpected event or a planned transition. Success or failure of a CEO transition is influenced by a host of obvious and non-obvious factors, many of them of a social/psychological nature. How these factors are managed can have an enormous impact on the performance and status of the organization.

== Regulatory opinion ==
In an October 2009 release, the United States Securities and Exchange Commission effectively removed the ordinary business exclusion defense used by companies reluctant to disclose their CEO succession process to shareholders. The policy change allows for a new wave of corporate governance scrutiny, as regulators and shareholders increasingly focus on CEO succession practices. Staff Bulletin (SLB 14E) announced that, in principle, the commission no longer allows companies to exclude shareholder proposals based on an argument that CEO succession planning is an ordinary business operations matter. In reversing its position, the SEC acknowledged that poor CEO succession planning constitutes a significant business risk and raises a policy issue on the governance of the corporation that transcends the day-to-day business of managing the workforce. The change indicates that regulators have reframed CEO succession as a risk management issue and placed its responsibility firmly in the boardroom. Succession planning responsibilities are redefined as “a key board function” and “a significant policy (and governance) issue … so that a company is not adversely affected by a vacancy in leadership.”

== Succession options ==
CEOs can be put in place from multiple options available to any organization, some of which are:

- Earmarking and training experienced and high value internal candidates for taking over the role of an outgoing CEO.
- Promoters may prefer to elevate family members (co-promoters) as CEO, subject to Board of Directors approval and investor approval (in case of listed firms).
- Hiring external CEOs from similar industries, culture and business expertise. This is done by outsourcing the work to executive search firms.

== CEO succession in family businesses ==
As documented by recent research by Wharton Professor Henning Piezunka, Founder- and CEO succession in family businesses come with particular challenges. The CEO is often unwilling to pass on the leadership of the family enterprise as doing so may also undermine the CEO's role in the family. Administering a successful transition despite these challenges requires careful moderation and active maintenance of the boundary between the business- and the family-sphere. An additional challenge can lie in the qualification of children for the role of the successor - requiring firm to engage in parallel search for potential candidates with and without family linkage.

== See also ==
- Outline of management

=== Books ===
- Wackerle, F.W., (2001). ‘’The Right CEO: Straight Talk about Making Tough CEO Selection Decisions’’. New York: John Wiley & Sons

=== Articles ===
- Pellet, J., (2009). “What’s Wrong with CEO Succession?” Chief Executive, 240.
- nile, M., (2009). "The Art of CEO Succession," BusinessWeek, 4130.
- Charan, R., (2005). ‘’Ending the CEO Succession Crisis,’’ Harvard Business Review, 83(2).
- Balloun, J., & McGill, J. (2005). “Succession Planning: A Critical Boardroom Imperative,” NACD Directors Monthly, 29(9).
- Dierickx, C., & McGill, J. (2007). “The Dark Side of CEO Succession,” Chief Executive, 225.
- Dierickx, C., & Veneziano, J. (2008). “Three Keys to CEO Succession,” People & Strategy, 31(2).
- Directorship Magazine (2009). “CEO Succession"
- The Conference Board (2010). Examining the impact of SEC guidance changes on CEO succession planning
