= Governing body =

Designated body with authority

A governing body is a group of people that has the authority to exercise governance over an organization or political entity. The most formal is a government, a body whose sole responsibility and authority is to make binding decisions in a taken geopolitical system (such as a state) by establishing laws. Other types of governing include an organization (such as a corporation recognized as a legal entity by a government), a socio-political group (chiefdom, tribe, family, religious denomination, etc.), or another, informal group of people.

In business and outsourcing relationships, governance frameworks are built into relational contracts that foster long-term collaboration and innovation. A board of governors is often the governing body of a public institution, while a board of directors typically serves as the governing body of a corporation or other company larger or more complex than a partnership. Many professional sports have a sports governing body that serves as their regulating authority.

Governing bodies can vary widely in size, which is "important not only for acquiring the necessary range of skills to oversee the entity, but also in promoting cohesion, flexibility, and effective participation of the members to achieve their governance objectives". A governing body is only one component of a system of governance, which also requires a written framework under which the body must operate, and governance mechanisms to both carry out directives of the governing body, and to report information back to the governing body.

== Examples ==
Examples of governing bodies include: board of director and owners.

=== Education ===
- The school governing body of a school, particularly in Commonwealth areas
- Board of education, the governing body of a school or higher administrative level
- University Court, the governing body of a university in Scotland

=== Religion ===
- The Governing Body of Jehovah's Witnesses, the ruling council of Jehovah's Witnesses
- The Governing Body of the Church in Wales
- Governing Bodies of the Conference of European Churches

=== Sport ===
- FIFA, governing body of association football among others.
- FIA, governing body of motor racing.
- ICC, Governing Body of International Cricket.
- BCCI, Wealthiest and Powerful Cricket Sport Governing Body in India and world
