= Mushroom management =

Company with dysfunctional communication between managers and employees

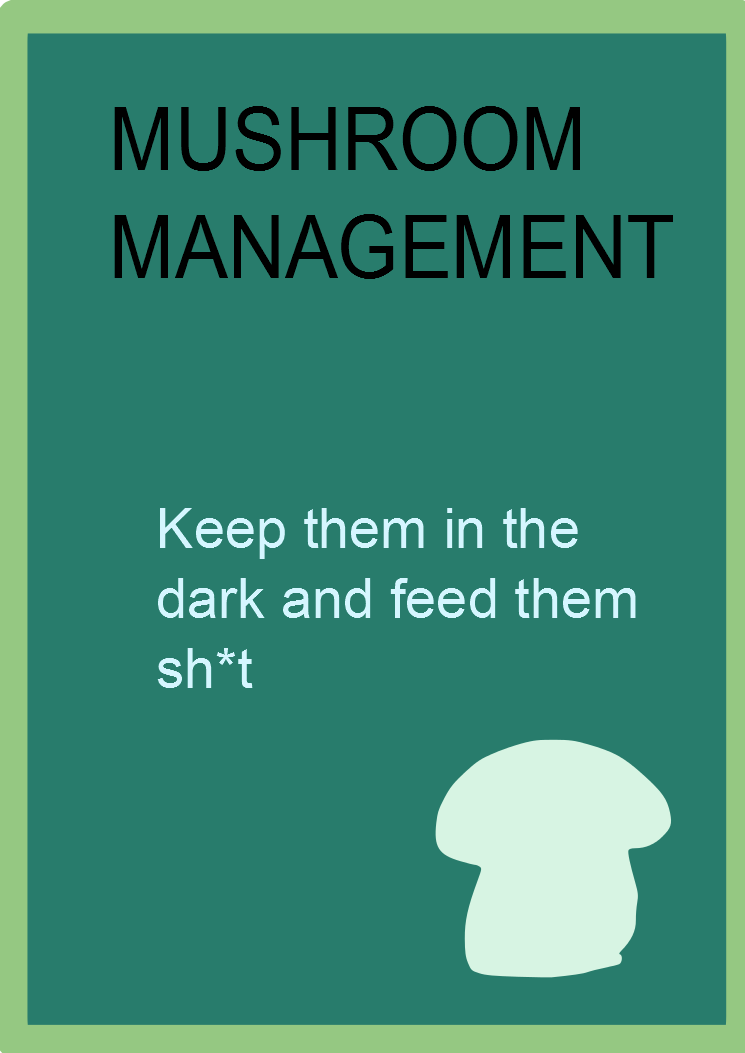

Mushroom management is the management of a company where the communication channels between the employers and the employees do not work effectively, and where employees are 'kept in the dark' by management in regards to business decisions that affect their work and employment. The term 'mushroom management' alludes to the stereotypical (and somewhat inaccurate) view of mushroom cultivation: kept in the dark and fed bullshit.

== Description ==
Mushroom management is a style of management in which the personnel are not familiar with the ideas or the general state of the company, and are given work without knowing the purpose of this work, in contrast with open-book management. Mushroom management means that workers' curiosity and self-expression are not supported. The employees often have no idea what the company's overall situation is, because the leaders tend to make all the decisions on their own, without asking anyone else to give their opinion. This problem can occur when the manager does not understand the employees' work (in a software company, for example) and therefore cannot communicate effectively with the employees.

== History ==
In 1981, mushroom management was described in the book The Soul of a New Machine as "an old expression, used in many corners of corporate America". It was defined as: "Put 'em in the dark, feed 'em shit, and watch 'em grow."

== Benefits ==
The key feature of mushroom management is that the employees have limited responsibility over the company. The importance of the decisions they have to make is minimal, which can often reduce workplace-related stress.

== Consequences ==
The consequences of mushroom management can be extremely detrimental for everyone involved in the company. If the flow of information within a company is insufficient, the people involved often have a limited understanding of how to react in situations that require quick assessment and prompt decision making. For example, a company that makes and sells shoes might research their customers' preferences and discover that these preferences have changed. However, if this piece of information is not passed on to the sales manager of an individual shop, then the shop will still display the "old" shoes and will not attract the customers' attention effectively. At the end of this process, the blame is sometimes even attributed to the shop assistants, because they are the employees in a direct contact with the customers. Mushroom management includes the following problems:

- Negative employee attitudes and lower commitment
- Growing employee cynicism
- Reverse mushroom behavior (employees behaving in similar ways as management, i.e. not telling information)
- Limited ability of employees to understand or contribute in the organization

== Examples ==
=== Bankruptcy of Lehman Brothers ===
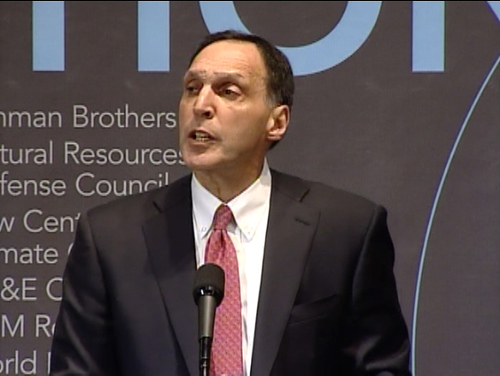
Richard Fuld, Lehman Brothers CEO.

During the bankruptcy of Lehman Brothers in 2008, considerable information about the bank's management was revealed, including the way Richard S. Fuld, Jr., the former CEO, organised the bank. The bank had started to concentrate more and more on excessively risky mortgages; however, neither the employees nor the public were aware of the bank's financial situation. Fuld, together with other managers, had kept a significant amount of essential information secret, as well as lying to the investors and to all other involved parties. Everybody else had thought that Lehman Brothers were involved with a variety of investments, including both safe and risky investments; in reality, though, they had been working with a much more risky portfolio than was appropriate. After the bank became bankrupt, Fuld refused to take the blame for any of these events, even though he was responsible for the concealment of the information.

=== Sinking of the Titanic ===
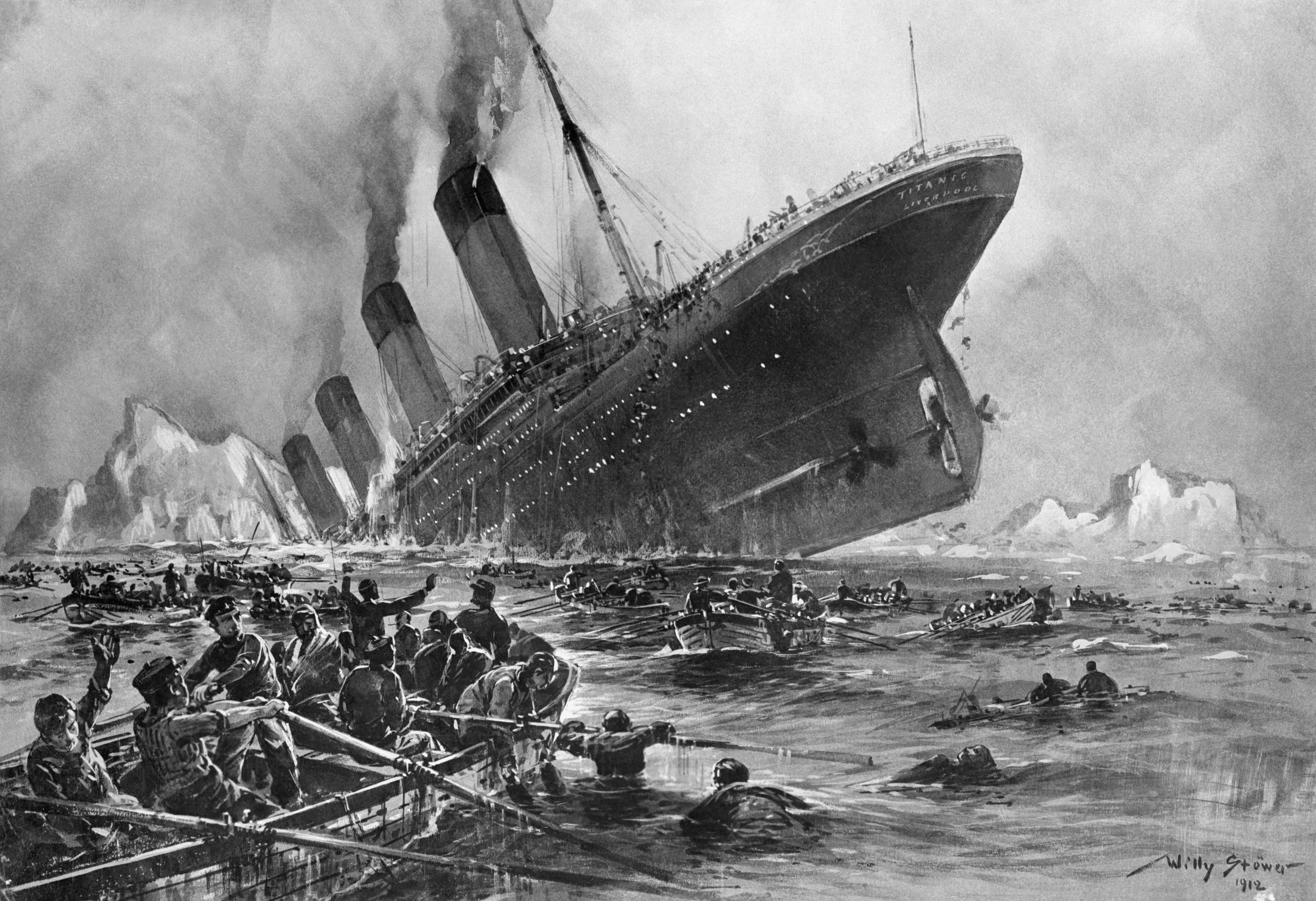
Titanic sinking.

Mushroom management can also occur during the handling of one-off, individual situations. When the RMS Titanic hit an iceberg, only a few members of the crew were aware that the ship was going to sink. Most of the crewmen were not informed about the seriousness of the situation by the captain, which resulted in chaos and disorganisation. The captain attempted to act on his own, without incorporating the officers into his decisions.

== Countermeasures ==
Managers should learn how to distribute information and how to communicate with the people they are responsible for. The best way to avoid mushroom management is transparency.

== Good mushroom management ==
Sometimes, mushroom management can be very helpful if it is handled carefully. This method involves the company's employees being divided into various groups, each of which has all the information which it specifically needs but nothing more, similar to a need to know approach taken in the military to control access to sensitive material. Meanwhile, the manager is in charge of giving each group the required information. This kind of management is extremely difficult, though, and requires considerable skill.

== See also ==
- Seagull management – Dysfunctional management style
- Need to know – Restricting knowledge to specific people
- Carrot and stick – Metaphor for the use of punishment and reward
- Kiss up kick down – Form of social malfunction
- Employee silence – Lack of communication within an organization
