= Decentralized decision-making =

Decentralized decision-making is any process where the decision-making authority is distributed throughout a larger group. It also connotes a higher authority given to lower level functionaries, executives, and workers. This can be in any organization of any size; it may be present in a governmental authority to a corporation. However, the context in which the term is used is generally that of larger organizations. This distribution of power, in effect, has far-reaching implications in the fields of management, organizational behavior, and government.

The decisions arising from a process of decentralized decision-making are the functional result of group intelligence and crowd wisdom. Decentralized decision-making also contributes to the core knowledge of group intelligence and crowd wisdom, often in a subconscious way à la Carl Jung's collective unconscious.

Decision theory is a method of deductive reasoning based on formal probability and deductive reasoning models. It is also studied in a specialized field of mathematics, wherein models are used to help make decisions in all human activities including the sciences and engineering. (See also Game theory, Uncertainty, Expectation maximization principle.)

== History ==
Decentralization and centralization have been consistent themes throughout history pertaining to governmental authority and political theory. From the rise and fall of the Roman Empire, there have been periods of centralization and decentralization in societies worldwide. Almost any political movement, from the rise of city states in Roman times, to the later rise and downfall of feudal empires during the Middle Ages, to the rise of fascism in Germany prior to World War II, and to the late 20th century formation of the European Economic Union; the history of Europe has been one of cycles of centralization and decentralization.

MIT Professor Thomas W. Malone explains that "decentralization has three general benefits:

1. encourages motivation and creativity
2. allows many minds to work simultaneously on the same problem
3. accommodates flexibility and individualization

Decentralized decision-making, Malone says, tends to create less rigidity and flatter hierarchies in organizations. When upper management delegates decision-making responsibilities, there also exist wider spans of control among managers, creating a more lateral flow of information. Thus, there will be more bottom up directional information flow, allowing for more innovation and efficiency closer to the means of production. This increased flow of information thereby allows for innovation in what is called as Total quality management.

== See also ==
- Cointelligence
- Collective intelligence
- Crowd psychology
- Crowd wisdom
- Delphi method
- Early adopter
- Group intelligence
- Groupthink
- Herd instinct
- Information cascade
- Opinion leadership
- Outline of management
- Social networks
- Sociocracy
- Mosaic defence strategy

== References and further reading ==
- Drucker, Peter F., Post-Capitalist Society. (1993) HarperBusiness, New York.
- Gerstner Jr., Louis V., Who Says Elephants Can't Dance? Inside IBM's Historic Turnaround. (2002) HarperBusiness, New York.
- Gladwell, Malcolm, The Tipping Point: How Little Things Can Make a Big Difference. (2002) Little, Brown & Co., Boston.
- Kahneman, Daniel, & Tversky, Amos, Choices, Values, and Frames (2000) Cambridge University Press, Cambridge, United Kingdom.
- Malone, Thomas W.,"Is 'Empowerment' Just a Fad? Control, Decision-Making, and Information Technology," Sloan Management Review 23: 38, no. 2 (1997).
- Malone, Thomas W., The Future of Work: How the New Order of Business Will Shape Your Organization, Your Management Style, and Your Life. (2004) Harvard Business School Press, Cambridge, Massachusetts.
- Trotter, Wilfred, Instincts of the Herd in Peace and War. (1915) Macmillan, New York.
- Surowiecki, James, The Wisdom of Crowds: Why the Many Are Smarter Than the Few and How Collective Wisdom Shapes Business, Economies, Societies and Nations. (2004) Little, Brown, Boston.
- Sunstein, Cass, Infotopia: How Many Minds Produce Knowledge. (2006) Oxford University Press, Oxford, United Kingdom.
