= Hands On USA =

Hands On USA (HOUSA), now All Hands and Hearts, was a relief project established to help victims of Hurricane Katrina. HOUSA was organized by the non-profit relief organization Hands On Disaster Response.

HOUSA was formed the week after Hurricane Katrina hit the Gulf Coast of the United States.

Entrepreneurs David Campbell and Darius A. Monsef co-founded HOUSA after meeting in Thailand while both were doing relief work following the 2004 Tsunami. Campbell served as the executive director for the Katrina Relief Project and Darius served as the operations director. Three months into the project Marc A. Young joined HOUSA as a second operations director.

After four months of work in Mississippi, HOUSA handed their volunteer operation over to Hands On Network, based in Atlanta, Georgia. This operation was named Hands On Gulf Coast, which continued to operate a volunteer center out of the Beauvoir Methodist Church in Biloxi, Mississippi, until February 2009.
