= Governance framework =

Political science terminology

Governance frameworks are the structure of a government and reflect the interrelated relationships, factors, and other influences upon the institution. Governance structure is often used interchangeably with governance framework as they both refer to the structure of the governance of the organization. Governance frameworks structure and delineate power and the governing or management roles in an organization. They also set rules, procedures, and other informational guidelines. In addition, governance frameworks define, guide, and provide for enforcement of these processes. These frameworks are shaped by the goals, strategic mandate], financial incentives, and established power structures and processes of the organization.

Governance frameworks establish and perpetuate the efficiency or lack of efficiency in an organization or institution's ability to meet its goals, and even their public relations and perception. The organization of the governance framework is important for the success of the organization meeting its goals. Sociologist John Child states that these are connected and, in a circular manner, belief that changes in governance frameworks will succeed positively impacts the chance that the framework will result in the desired changes. Additionally, Williamson suggests that the organization of a governance framework results in economic consequences for that organization.

Frequently, the term good governance framework references a preferred style of governance that the author believes to be better suited to that industry or organization, especially in relation to public relations, and organizational and financial transparency.

== Applications ==
There are examples of the use of governance frameworks in a wide variety of industries, as well as in the government of nation states and the public sector.

In their application to specific industries, companies, and problems, governance frameworks appear differently and reflect the unique needs of the group or organization. In the governance structure of information technology (IT) organizations, multiple frameworks have been suggested by authors connecting IT issues to the underlying theoretical business, organizational sociology, and economic models. In marine ecology, governance framework suggestions proposed by Fanning et al. provide a guiding structure for the management and conservation of marine in the Wider Caribbean Region. Corporate governance frameworks are also well established and the theories behind how they are structured are discussed in academic papers, with different theoretical perspectives shaping how governance structures are used and influenced by the business. For example, Braganza and Lambert suggest that business leaders use an adaptable governance framework that they believe better addresses strategy as well as operation.

In the public sector's governance frameworks, issues of public opinion and financial transparency tied to the concept of good governance frameworks are important, according to consulting firm Clayton Utz. The Charity Commission for England and Wales, a public commission responsible for ensuring trustworthiness of registered charities in the United Kingdom emphasizes its motives and mission, and accountability and transparency goals in its governance framework. It also uses the governance framework to make publicly available its internal organization and leadership structure. Loorbach suggests governance frameworks for nation state governments' development which challenge current paradigms and that he suggests will lead to more sustainable development.

== See also ==
- Global governance
