= Handover (disambiguation) =

Handover may refer to:

- Handover of knowledge between humans, often as part of a formal transfer of responsibility. Sometimes known as a handoff in North America.
- Handover in telecommunications, the transfer of a call or session from one channel to another
- HanDover (album), a 2011 album by the band Skinny Puppy
- Handover (political), the political transfer of power
- Handover (rugby), the change of control of the ball in the game of rugby league
- Hand-Over, in animation, the process of adding finger and hand motion capture data to a full-body motion capture data
- Handover of Hong Kong from the United Kingdom to the People's Republic of China in 1997
- Handover of Macau from the Portuguese Republic to the People's Republic of China in 1999

== See also ==
- Hands-off (disambiguation)
- Handoff (disambiguation)
- Change-of-shift report
