= Certificate in Management Studies =

Certificate in Management Studies (CMS) also referred as Certificate in Management, Graduate Certificate in Management, Masters Entry Certificate in Management, is a UK undergraduate qualification normally comprising 3-4 modules of study in the area of Management. It forms the first half of Diploma in Management Studies (DMS).

== Pathway ==
The CMS & DMS form the pathway for many students going onto complete MBA's. Most of the institutions offering the CMS/DMS offer the MBA as the final stage or the credit for achieving the DMS can be transferred to another institution. The exams and coursework undertaken at this level serves as a foundation for similar assessment at the MBA level where there is a strong focus on research and written reports.

== Institutions offering the CMS ==
University	Duration	Method
The Open University	Flexible	Online/Distance)
University of Northampton	One year part-time	On-campus
University of Gloucestershire	Part-time	-
University of Leicester	unknown	unknown
University of Wales	up to 2 years	Online
University of Plymouth	Part-time	On-campus
Queen's University Belfast	Part-time	On-campus
Robert Gordon University	Part-time	On-campus
Abertay University	Part-time	-
DeMontfort University	Part-time	-
University of Huddersfield	Part-time	-
