= Peter Drucker =

American management consultant and author (1909–2005)

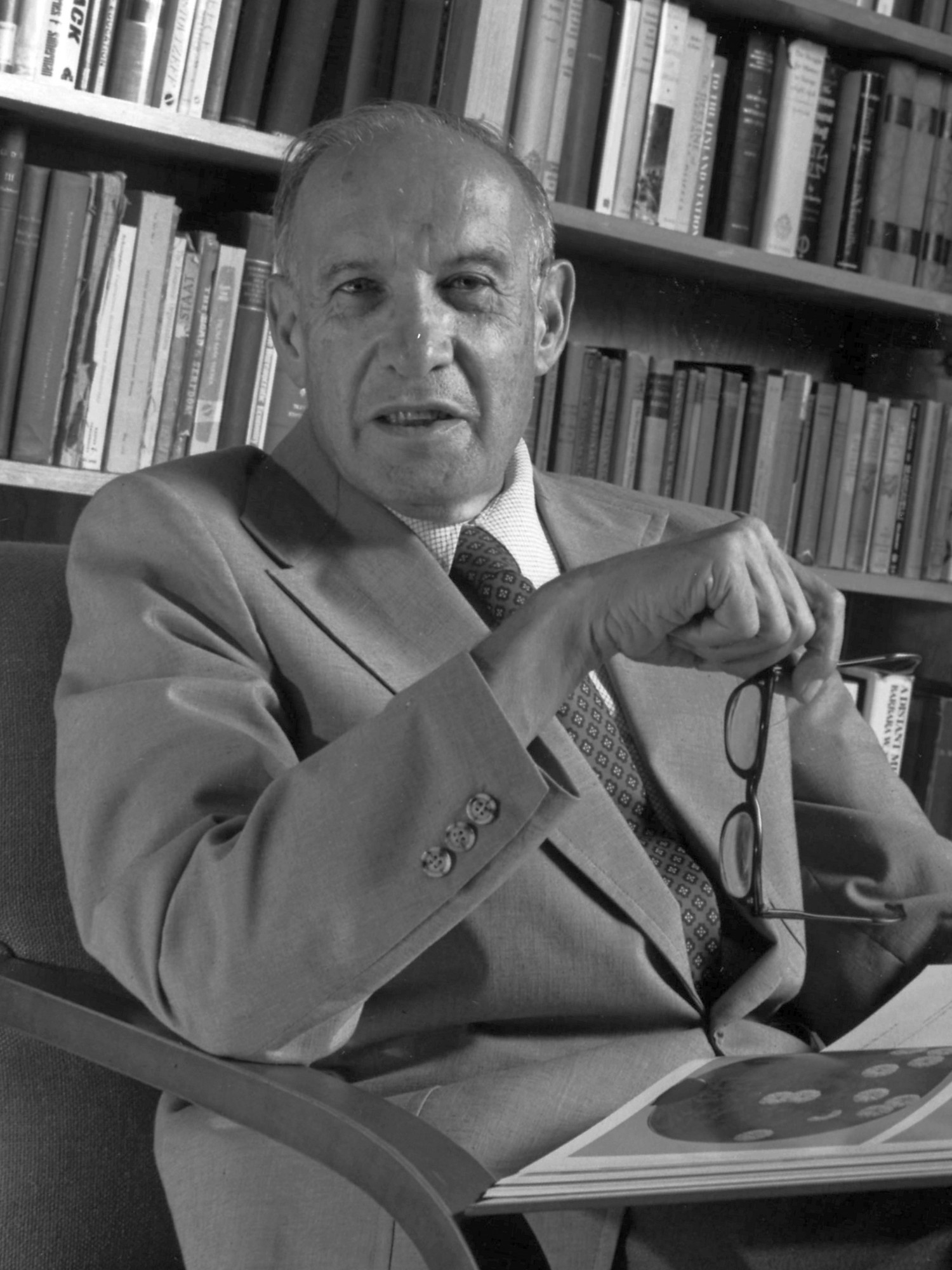
- Born: Peter Georg Ferdinand Drucker; 19 November 1909; Vienna, Austria-Hungary
- Died: 11 November 2005 (aged 95); Claremont, California, U.S.
- Occupations: Management consultant, educator, author
- Spouse: Doris Schmitz (m. 1937)
- Children: 4
- Awards: Henry Laurence Gantt Medal (1959); Austrian Cross of Honour for Science and Art, 1st class (1991); Presidential Medal of Freedom (2002)

Academic background
- Education: University of Hamburg; Goethe University Frankfurt (PhD)
- Thesis: Die Rechtfertigung des Völkerrechts aus dem Staatswillen (1931)

Academic work
- Institutions: Bennington College (1942–1949); New York University (1950–1971); Claremont Graduate School (1971–2005)
- Website: www.drucker.institute

Peter Ferdinand Drucker (/ˈdrʌkər/; German: [ˈdʁʊkɐ]; 19 November 1909 – 11 November 2005) was an Austrian American management consultant, educator, and author, whose writings contributed to the philosophical and practical foundations of modern management theory. He was also a leader in the development of management education, and contributed to the popularization of the concepts known as management by objectives and self-control, and he has been described as "the champion of management as a serious discipline".

Drucker's books and articles, both scholarly and popular, explored how humans are organized across the business, government, and nonprofit sectors of society. He is one of the best-known and most widely influential thinkers and writers on the subject of management theory and practice. His writings have predicted many of the major developments of the late twentieth century, including privatization and decentralization; the rise of Japan to economic world power; the decisive importance of marketing; and the emergence of the information society with its necessity of lifelong learning. In 1959, Drucker coined the term "knowledge worker", and later in his life considered knowledge-worker productivity to be the next frontier of management.

== Biography ==
Drucker grew up in what he referred to as a "liberal" Lutheran Protestant household in Austria-Hungary. His mother Caroline Bondi had studied medicine and his father Adolf Drucker was a lawyer and high-level civil servant. Drucker was born in Vienna, Austria, in the 19th district of Vienna-Döbling. He grew up in a home where intellectuals, high government officials, and scientists would meet to discuss new ideas. These included Joseph Schumpeter, Friedrich Hayek and Ludwig von Mises. Hans Kelsen was his uncle.

After graduating from Döbling Gymnasium in 1927, Drucker found few opportunities for employment in post-World War I Vienna, so he moved to Hamburg, Germany, first working as an apprentice at an established cotton trading company, then as a journalist, writing for Der Österreichische Volkswirt (The Austrian Economist). Drucker then moved to Frankfurt, where he took a job at the Daily Frankfurter General-Anzeiger. While in Frankfurt, he also earned a doctorate in international law and public law from the Goethe University Frankfurt in 1931.

In 1933, Drucker was a lecturer at Frankfurt when the Nazi regime took over. After the Nazi commissar appointed to oversee the university dismissed all the Jewish professors, Drucker left Germany within 48 hours for England. In London, he worked as a security analyst for an insurance company, then as the chief economist at a private bank. While in London, Drucker regularly attended John Maynard Keynes seminars at Cambridge University, discovering that he was interested in "the behaviour of people" while Keynes and other students focused on "the behaviour of commodities."

In 1937, Peter Drucker married Doris Schmitz, a classmate from the University of Frankfurt. The Druckers then moved to the U.S., where Peter Drucker became a freelance journalist writing for Harper's and The Washington Post. In 1939, Drucker joined Sarah Lawrence College in Bronxville, New York as a part-time economics instructor. Drucker was fired in 1941 after refusing to sign a faculty manifesto that he said "viciously and falsely attacked the liberal president of Brooklyn College, Harry Gideonse," who had supported the UK against Nazi Germany in the Battle of Britain. His 1939 book, The End of Economic Man, attracted attention of Bennington College president Lewis Webster Jones, who invited Drucker to lecture on the book. Despite some faculty objections, Jones hired Drucker as a professor of politics and philosophy at Bennington, a position Drucker would hold from 1942 to 1949. With the U.S. engaged in World War II, Drucker also became a consultant on international economic policy to the Board of Economic Warfare. In 1943, Drucker became a naturalized citizen of the United States.

Then from 1950 to 1971, Drucker was a professor of management at New York University. In 1954, Drucker wrote The Practice of Management, a book he set out to write after finding a lack of books specifically about business management at the General Electric library in Crotonville, New York. The Saturday Review and Business Week praised The Practice of Management as groundbreaking.

Drucker went to California in 1971, where he developed one of the country's first executive MBA programs for working professionals at Claremont Graduate University (then known as Claremont Graduate School). From 1971 until his death, he was the Clarke Professor of Social Science and Management at Claremont. Claremont Graduate University's management school was named the Peter F. Drucker Graduate School of Management in his honor in 1987 (later renamed the Peter F. Drucker and Masatoshi Ito Graduate School of Management). He established the Drucker Archives at Claremont Graduate University in 1999; the Archives became the Drucker Institute in 2006. Drucker taught his last class in 2002 at age 92. He continued to act as a consultant to businesses and nonprofit organizations well into his nineties.

== Work and philosophy ==
=== Early influences ===
Among Drucker's early influences was the Austrian economist Joseph Schumpeter, a friend of his father's, who impressed upon Drucker the idea of the importance of innovation and entrepreneurship. Drucker was also influenced, in a much different way, by John Maynard Keynes, whom he heard lecture in 1934 in Cambridge. "I suddenly realized that Keynes and all the brilliant economic students in the room were interested in the behaviour of commodities", Drucker wrote, "while I was interested in the behaviour of people".

Ultimately, his work drew from pioneering management consultant Mary Parker Follett.

Over the next 70 years, Drucker's writings would be marked by a focus on relationships among human beings, as opposed to the crunching of numbers. His books were filled with lessons on how organizations can bring out the best in people, and how workers can find a sense of community and dignity in a modern society organized around large institutions. As a business consultant, Drucker disliked the term "guru", though it was often applied to him; "I have been saying for many years", Drucker once remarked, "that we are using the word 'guru' only because 'charlatan' is too long to fit into a headline."

As a young writer, Drucker wrote two pieces – one on the conservative German philosopher Friedrich Julius Stahl and another called "The Jewish Question in Germany" – that were burned and banned by the Nazis. In 1939 he published a contemporary analysis of the rise of fascism called "The End of Economic Man". This was his first book, published in New York, in English. In the introduction he refers to "The Jewish Question in Germany" saying "An early excerpt [of this book] was published as a pamphlet by an Austrian Catholic and Anti-Nazi in ... 1936".

=== The "business thinker" ===
Drucker's career as a business thinker took off in 1942, when his initial writings on politics and society won him access to the internal workings of General Motors (GM), one of the largest companies in the world at that time. His experiences in Europe had left him fascinated with the problem of authority. He shared his fascination with Donaldson Brown, the mastermind behind the administrative controls at GM. In 1943 Brown invited him in to conduct what might be called a "political audit": a two-year social-scientific analysis of the corporation. Drucker attended every board meeting, interviewed employees, and analyzed production and decision-making processes.

The resulting book, Concept of the Corporation, popularized GM's multidivisional structure and led to numerous articles, consulting engagements, and additional books. GM, however, was hardly thrilled with the final product. Drucker had suggested that the auto giant might want to re-examine a host of long-standing policies on customer relations, dealer relations, employee relations and more. Inside the corporation, Drucker's counsel was viewed as hypercritical. GM's revered chairman, Alfred Sloan, was so upset about the book that he "simply treated it as if it did not exist," Drucker later recalled, "never mentioning it and never allowing it to be mentioned in his presence."

Drucker taught that management is "a liberal art", and he infused his management advice with interdisciplinary lessons from history, sociology, psychology, philosophy, culture and religion. He also believed strongly that all institutions, including those in the private sector, have a responsibility to the whole of society. "The fact is," Drucker wrote in his 1973 Management: Tasks, Responsibilities, Practices, "that in modern society there is no other leadership group but managers. If the managers of our major institutions, and especially of business, do not take responsibility for the common good, no one else can or will."

Drucker was intrigued by employees who knew more about certain subjects than their bosses or colleagues, and yet had to cooperate with others in a large organization. Rather than simply glorify the phenomenon as the epitome of human progress, Drucker analyzed it, and explained how it challenged the common thinking about how organizations should be run.

His approach worked well in the increasingly mature business world of the second half of the twentieth century. By that time large corporations had developed the basic manufacturing efficiencies and managerial hierarchies of mass production. Executives thought they knew how to run companies, and Drucker took it upon himself to poke holes in their beliefs, lest organizations become stale. But he did so in a sympathetic way. He assumed that his readers were intelligent, rational, hardworking people of goodwill. If their organizations struggled, he believed it was usually because of outdated ideas, a narrow conception of problems, or internal misunderstandings.

Drucker developed an extensive consulting business built around his personal relationship with top management. He became legendary among many of post-war Japan's new business leaders trying to rebuild their war-torn homeland. He advised the heads of General Motors, Sears, General Electric, W.R. Grace and IBM, among many others. Over time he offered his management advice to nonprofits like the American Red Cross and the Salvation Army. His advice was eagerly sought by the senior executives of the Adela Investment Company, a private initiative of the world's multinational corporations to promote investment in the developing countries of Latin America.

=== Writings ===
Drucker's 39 books have been translated into more than thirty-six languages. Two are novels, and one – Adventures of a Bystander (1978) – is an autobiography. He is the co-author of a book on Japanese painting, and made eight series of educational films on management topics. He also penned a regular column in the Wall Street Journal for 10 years and contributed frequently to the Harvard Business Review, The Atlantic Monthly, and The Economist.

His work is especially popular in Japan, even more so after the publication of "What If the Female Manager of a High-School Baseball Team Read Drucker's Management", a novel that features the main character using one of his books to great effect, which was also adapted into an anime and a live action film. His popularity in Japan may be compared with that of his contemporary W. Edwards Deming.

=== Key ideas ===
- Decentralization and simplification. Drucker discounted the command and control model and asserted that companies work best when they are decentralized. According to Drucker, corporations tend to produce too many products, hire employees they don't need (when a better solution would be outsourcing), and expand into economic sectors that they should avoid.
- The prediction of the decline and marginalization of the "blue collar" worker.
- The concept of what eventually came to be known as "outsourcing". He used the example of "front room" and "back room" of each business: a company should be engaged in only the front room activities that are critical to supporting its core business. Back room activities should be handed over to other companies, for whom these tasks are the front room activities.
- The importance of the nonprofit sector, which he calls the third sector (the private and government sectors being the first two). Non-Governmental Organizations (NGOs) play crucial roles in the economies of countries around the world.
- A profound skepticism of macroeconomic theory. Drucker contended that economists of all schools fail to explain significant aspects of modern economies.
- A lament that the sole focus of microeconomics is price. Drucker noted that microeconomics fails to show what products actually do for us, thereby stimulating commercial interest in how to calculate what products actually do for us from their price.
- Economic chain costing: the idea that a competitive company needs to know the costs of its entire economic chain, not simply the costs for which it is responsible as an individual business within that chain. "What matters ... is the economic reality, the costs of the entire [production] process, regardless of who owns what."
- Respect for the worker: Drucker believed that employees are assets, not liabilities. He taught that knowledgeable workers are the essential ingredients of the modern economy, and that a hybrid management model is the sole method of demonstrating an employee's value to the organization. Central to this philosophy is the view that people are an organization's most valuable resource, and that a manager's job is both to prepare people to perform and to give them freedom to do so.
- A belief in what he called "the sickness of government". Drucker made nonpartisan claims that government is often unable or unwilling to provide new services that people need and/or want, though he believed that this condition is not intrinsic to the form of government. The chapter "The Sickness of Government", in his book The Age of Discontinuity, formed the basis of New Public Management, a theory of public administration that dominated the discipline in the 1980s and 1990s.
- The need for "planned abandonment". Businesses and governments have a natural human tendency to cling to "yesterday's successes" rather than seeing when they are no longer useful.
- A belief that taking action without thinking is the cause of every failure.
- The need for community. Early in his career, Drucker predicted the "end of economic man" and advocated the creation of a "plant community", where an individual's social needs could be met. He later acknowledged that the plant community never materialized, and by the 1980s, suggested that volunteering in the nonprofit sector was the key to fostering a healthy society where people found a sense of belonging and civic pride.
- The need to manage business by balancing a variety of needs and goals, rather than subordinating an institution to a single value. This concept of management by objectives and self-control forms the keynote of his 1954 landmark The Practice of Management.
- A company's primary responsibility is to serve its customers. Profit is not the primary goal, but rather an essential condition for the company's continued existence and sustainability.
- A belief in the notion that great companies could stand among mankind's noblest inventions.
- "Do what you do best and outsource the rest" is a business tagline first "coined and developed" in the 1990s by Drucker. The slogan was used primarily to advocate outsourcing as a viable business strategy. Drucker began explaining the concept of outsourcing as early as 1989 in his Wall Street Journal (WSJ) article entitled "Sell the Mailroom."

== Criticism ==
The Wall Street Journal researched several of his lectures in 1987 and reported that he was sometimes loose with the facts. Drucker falsely claimed, for example, that the English language was the official language for all employees at Japan's Mitsui trading company. Drucker defended himself: "I use anecdotes to make a point, not to write history."

Also, while Drucker was known for his prescience, he was not always correct in his forecasts. He predicted, for instance, that the United States' financial center would shift from New York to Washington.

Others maintain that one of Drucker's core concepts, "management by objectives," is flawed and has never really been proven to work effectively. Critic Dale Krueger said that the system is difficult to implement and that companies often wind up overemphasizing control, as opposed to fostering creativity, to meet their goals.

Drucker's classic work, Concept of the Corporation, criticized General Motors while it was considered the most successful corporation in the world. Many of GM's executives considered Drucker persona non grata for a long time afterward. Although Alfred P. Sloan refrained from personal hostility toward Drucker, he considered Drucker's critiques of GM's management to be "dead wrong".

== Awards and honors ==
Drucker was awarded the Presidential Medal of Freedom by US President George W. Bush on July 9, 2002. He also received honors from the government of Austria, including the Grand Silver Medal for Services to the Republic of Austria in 1974, the Grand Gold Decoration for Services to the Republic of Austria in 1991 and the Austrian Cross of Honour for Science and Art, 1st class in 1999 and the Order of the Sacred Treasure, 3rd class; June 24, 1966, from the government of Japan.

Drucker was the Honorary Chairman of the Peter F. Drucker Foundation for Nonprofit Management, now the Leader to Leader Institute, from 1990 through 2002. In 1969 he was awarded New York University's highest honor, its Presidential Citation. For his article, "What Makes an Effective Executive", Harvard Business Review honored Drucker in the June 2004 with his seventh McKinsey Award – the most awarded to an individual. Drucker was inducted into the Junior Achievement US Business Hall of Fame in 1996. He received 25 honorary doctorates from American, Belgian, Czech, English, Spanish and Swiss universities. His 1954 book The Practice of Management was voted the third most influential management book of the 20th century in a poll of the Fellows of the Academy of Management. In Claremont, California, Eleventh Street between College Avenue and Dartmouth Avenue was renamed "Drucker Way" in October 2009 to commemorate the 100th anniversary of Drucker's birth. Drucker was posthumously honored when he was inducted into the Outsourcing Hall of Fame in recognition of his outstanding contributions in the field. In 2018, Drucker was named the world's most influential business thinker on the Thinkers50.com list.

== Legacy ==
At Claremont Graduate University, the Peter F. Drucker Graduate Management Center – now the Peter F. Drucker and Masatoshi Ito Graduate School of Management – was established in 1987 and continues to be guided by Drucker's principles.

The annual Global Peter Drucker Forum was first held in 2009, the centenary of Drucker's birth.

== Personal life ==
Peter Drucker married Doris Schmitz in 1937; they had four children. On 11 November 2005, Peter Drucker died of natural causes in Claremont, California, aged 95. Doris died in October 2014 at the age of 103.

== Bibliography ==
- 1939: The End of Economic Man: A Study of the New Totalitarianism. New York: The John Day Company. 1939 – via Internet Archive.
- 1942: The Future of Industrial Man: A Conservative Approach. New York: The John Day Company. 1942 – via Internet Archive.
- 1946: Concept of the Corporation. New York: The John Day Company. 1946 – via Internet Archive.
- 1950: The New Society: The Anatomy of Industrial Order. New York: Harper & Brothers. 1950 – via Internet Archive.
- 1954: The Practice of Management. New York: Harper & Brothers. 1954 – via Internet Archive.
- 1957: America's Next Twenty Years. New York: Harper & Brothers. 1957 – via Internet Archive.
- 1959: The Landmarks of Tomorrow (New York: Harper & Brothers)
- 1964: Managing for Results. New York: Harper & Row. 1964.
- 1967: The Effective Executive. New York: Harper & Row. 1967. ISBN 9780060318253.
- 1969: The Age of Discontinuity: Guidelines for Our Changing Society. New York: Harper & Row. 1969.
- 1970: Technology, Management and Society (New York: Harper & Row)
- 1971: The New Markets and Other Essays (London: William Heinemann Ltd.)
- 1971: Men, Ideas and Politics (New York: Harper & Row)
- 1971: Drucker on Management (London: Management Publications Limited)
- 1973: Management: Tasks, Responsibilities, Practices' (New York: Harper & Row)
- 1976: The Unseen Revolution: How Pension Fund Socialism Came to America (New York: Harper & Row)
- 1977: People and Performance: The Best of Peter Drucker on Management (New York: Harper's College Press)
- 1978: Adventures of a Bystander. New York: Harper & Row. 1978. ISBN 9780060111014.
- 1980: Managing in Turbulent Times (New York: Harper & Row)
- 1981: Toward the next economics, and other essays (New York: Harper & Row) ISBN 0060148284
- 1982: The Changing World of Executive (New York: Harper & Row)
- 1982: The Last of All Possible Worlds (New York: Harper & Row)
- 1984: The Temptation to Do Good (London: William Heinemann Ltd.)
- 1985: Innovation and Entrepreneurship (New York: Harper & Row)
- 1986: The Frontiers of Management: Where Tomorrow's Decisions are Being Shaped Today (New York: Truman Talley Books/E.D. Dutton)
- 1989: The New Realities: in Government and Politics, in Economics and Business, in Society and World View (New York: Harper & Row)
- 1990: Managing the Nonprofit Organization: Practices and Principles (New York: HarperCollins)
- 1992: Managing for the Future (New York: HarperCollins)
- 1993: The Ecological Vision (New Brunswick, NJ and London: Transaction Publishers)
- 1993: Post-Capitalist Society (New York: HarperCollins)
- 1995: Managing in a Time of Great Change (New York: Truman Talley Books/Dutton)
- 1997: Drucker on Asia: A Dialogue between Peter Drucker and Isao Nakauchi (Tokyo: Diamond Inc.)
- 1998: Peter Drucker on the Profession of Management (Boston: Harvard Business School Publishing)
- 1999: Management Challenges for 21st Century (New York: Harper Business)
- 1999: Managing Oneself (Boston: Harvard Business School Publishing) [published 2008 from article in Harvard Business Review]
- 2001: The Essential Drucker (New York: Harper Business)
- 2002: Managing in the Next Society (New York: Truman Talley Books/St. Martin's Press)
- 2002: A Functioning Society (New Brunswick, NJ and London: Transaction Publishers)
- 2004: The Daily Drucker (New York: Harper Business)
- 2008 (posthumous): The Five Most Important Questions (San Francisco: Jossey-Bass)

=== Other publications ===
Early monographs in German

- 1932: The Justification of International Law and the Will of the State (doctoral dissertation)
- 1933: Friedrich Julius Stahl, Conservative Political Theory and Historical Development (Tübingen: Mohr)
- 1936: The Jewish Question in Germany (Wien: Gsur)

Contributing writer

- 1961: Power and Democracy in America (Westport, Connecticut: Greenwood Press Publishers)
- 1969: Preparing Tomorrow's Business Leaders Today (Englewood Cliffs, NJ: Prentice Hall)
- 1979: Song of the Brush: Japanese Painting from Sanso Collection (Seattle: Seattle Art Museum)
- 1988: Handbook of Management by Objectives with Bill Reddin and Denis Ryan (Published by Tata McGraw-Hill in New Delhi).
- 1991: The Rise of NEC (Blackwell Business)

Miscellaneous

- 1977: An Introductory View of Management (New York: Harper & Row)
- 1977 (revised edition, 2009): Management Cases (New York: Harper & Row)
- 2006: The Effective Executive In Action with Joseph A. Maciariello (New York: HarperCollins)
- 2006: Classic Drucker (Boston: Harvard Business Review Press)
- 2008 (posthumous): Management: Revised with Sujog Arya (New York: HarperCollins)
