= Concept of the Corporation =

1946 book by Peter Drucker

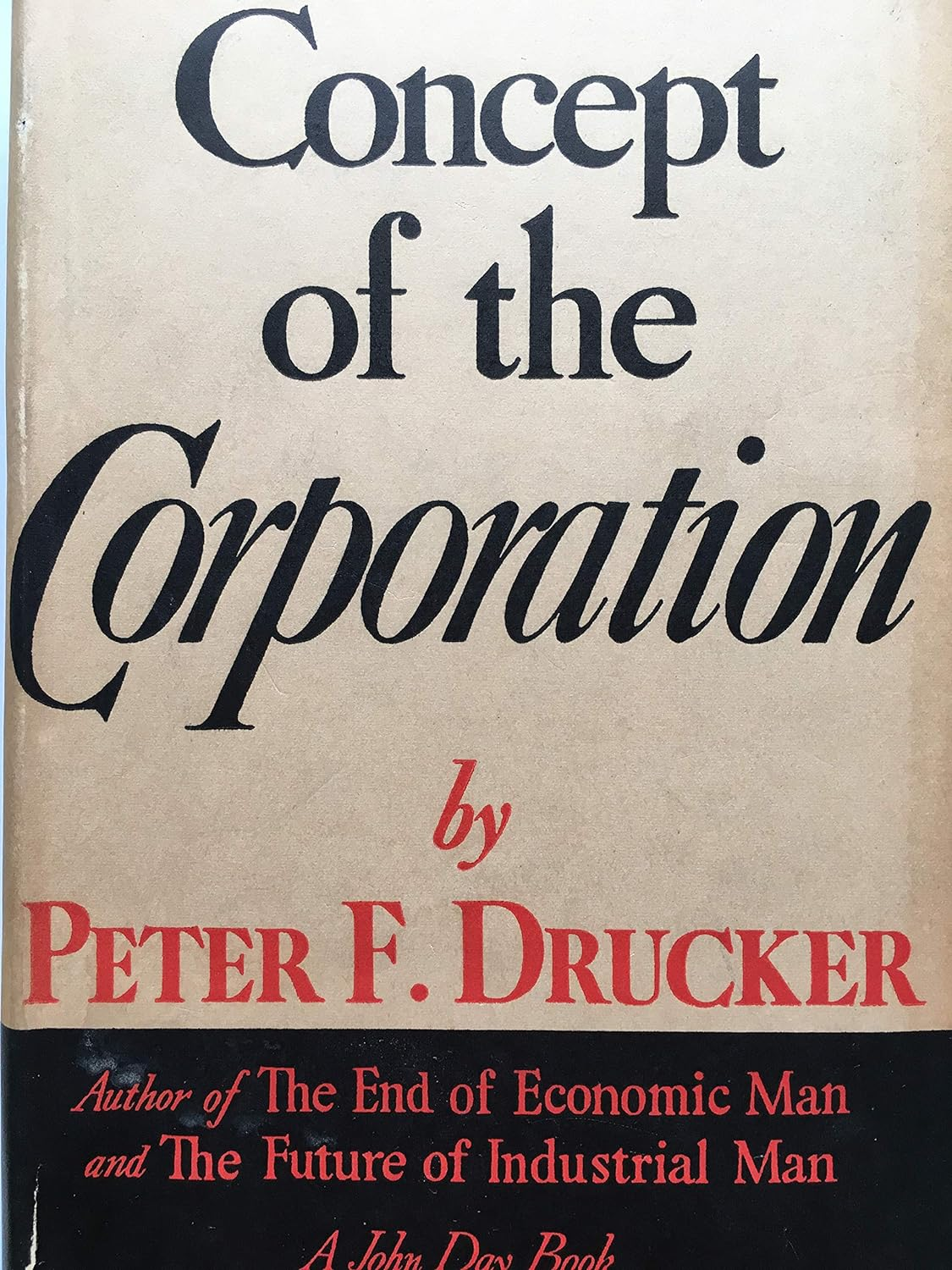
- Cover to the first edition
- Author: Peter Drucker
- Language: English
- Publisher: John Day
- Publication date: 1946
- Publication place: United States
- Pages: 329
- ISBN: 978-1560006251
- OCLC: 25370125
- Dewey Decimal: 338.7/4/0973 20
- LC Class: HD2731 .D7 1993

Concept of the Corporation (1946) is a book by management professor and sociologist Peter Drucker.

== Overview ==
The book is an examination of General Motors' operations, delving into how large corporations impact society on a broad level. Drucker's biographer Jack Beatty referred to it as "a book about business, the way Moby Dick is a book about whaling".

In writing and researching the book, Drucker was given access to General Motors resources, paid a full salary, accompanied CEO Alfred P. Sloan to meetings, and was given free run of the company.

Drucker's focus was the insider view of the company. He focused, in contrast to his contemporaries, on what happened inside a company and how this related to the company's success or failure. Fascinated by this question, he studied management to find out what really made a business tick.

Until then, management was seen as a no-brainer: the CEO would simply give the orders and the others would follow. But Drucker was interested in the human interactions within a company, and more specifically on how power structures, political environments, information flows, decision making and managerial autonomy contributed to success. By shifting his focus, he was able to explain why General Motors was such a success.

== General Motors' reaction ==
GM was very pleased with Drucker's work, until Drucker published his book, Concept of the Corporation. The book strongly praises General Motors for developing management techniques, programs, and infrastructure. But GM interpreted the suggestions that Drucker made—to decentralise the company in order to even become more successful—as betrayal. Their reaction was so strong against his view of the work, that it would lead to Alfred Sloan later treating his memoir, My Years with General Motors, largely as the organization's rebuttal to Drucker's criticisms, and as a curricular counterbalance to his book's seminal influence in the field of management education (which was blossoming as a field of postgraduate study at the time).

For Drucker this was completely unexpected: He found GM a great company, which he had even compared with the U.S. government. Drucker used the term "federal decentralization" to describe it, as he felt that a company should be organized in a number of autonomous businesses. Much like the way the U.S. Government gave power to the states, GM should give its divisions more autonomy. It would take GM several decades to listen. By then, Drucker had helped the Japanese, who embraced his intentions and the hybrid organization form, leap in front of many American companies.

== Bibliography ==
- Sloan, Alfred P. (1964), McDonald, John (ed.), My Years with General Motors, Garden City, NY, US: Doubleday, LCCN 64011306, OCLC 802024. Republished in 1990 with a new introduction by Peter Drucker (ISBN 978-0385042352).
