= Institute of Management and Economics =

Institute of Management and Economics is a professional business bachelor's degree institution located in Amsterdam, Netherlands. The education institution uses educational technology to teach students. The institute is part of the Amsterdam University of Applied Sciences (Dutch: Hogeschool van Amsterdam), which is a professional vocational university.

Notable is that they are a partner to the Johan Cruijff University, located in the same building.
