= Handoff (disambiguation) =

Handoff is the process of transferring an ongoing call or data session from one channel connected to the core network to another channel.

Handoff may also refer to:

- Handoff (aviation), a technique used in air traffic control
- Handoff (American football), a type of offensive play in American football
- Stiff-arm fend, a tactic used in rugby football
- Handoff (Continuity), a feature introduced in Apple Inc's iOS 8 and OS X Yosemite operating systems
- "The Handoff", an episode of the television series Fallout

== See also ==
- Hands-off (disambiguation)
- Handover (disambiguation)
