= Management =

Coordinating the efforts of persons

Management (or managing) is the administration of organizations, whether businesses, nonprofit organizations, or government bodies through business administration, nonprofit management, or the political science sub-field of public administration respectively. It is the process of managing the resources of businesses, governments, and other organizations.

Larger organizations generally have three hierarchical levels of managers, organized in a pyramid structure:

- Senior management roles include the board of directors and a chief executive officer (CEO) or a president of an organization. They set the organization's strategic goals and policies and make decisions about how the organization will operate. Senior managers are generally executive-level professionals who provide direction to middle management. Compare governance.
- Middle management roles include branch managers, regional managers, department managers, and section managers. They provide direction to front-line managers and communicate senior management's strategic goals and policies to them.
- Line management roles include supervisors and the frontline managers or team leaders who oversee the work of regular employees, or volunteers in some voluntary organizations, and provide direction on their work. Line managers often perform the managerial functions that are traditionally considered the core of management. Despite the name, they are usually considered part of the workforce rather than the organization's management class.

Management is taught — both as a theoretical subject and as a practical application — across different disciplines at colleges and universities. Prominent degree programs in management include Management, Business Administration, and Public Administration. Social scientists study management as an academic discipline, investigating areas such as social organization, organizational adaptation, and organizational leadership. In recent decades, there has been a movement for evidence-based management.

== Etymology ==
The English verb manage has its roots in the fifteenth-century French verb mesnager, which often referred in equestrian language "to hold in hand the reins of a horse". Also the Italian term maneggiare (to handle, especially tools or a horse) is possible. In Spanish, manejar can also mean to rule the horses. These three terms derive from the two Latin words manus (hand) and agere (to act).

The word management dates back to the 1590s, when it was first used to mean "the act of managing by direction or manipulation," formed from manage plus the suffix -ment. By the 1670s, it had also come to describe "the act of managing by physical manipulation." Later, in 1739, the word was increasingly used to refer to "a governing body" or "the directors of an undertaking collectively," a sense that originally applied to theaters.

== Definitions ==
Views on the definition and scope of management include:

- Henri Fayol (1841–1925) stated: "To manage is to forecast and to plan, to organize, to command, to co-ordinate and to control".
- Fredmund Malik (born 1944) defines management as "the transformation of resources into utility".
- Ghislain Deslandes defines management as "a vulnerable force, under pressure to achieve results and endowed with the triple power of constraint, imitation, and imagination, operating on subjective, interpersonal, institutional and environmental levels".
- Peter Drucker (1909–2005) saw the basic task of management as twofold: marketing and innovation.

=== Theoretical scope ===
Management involves identifying the mission, objective, procedures, rules and manipulation of the human capital of an enterprise to contribute to the success of the enterprise. Scholars have focused on the management of individual, organizational, and inter-organizational relationships. This implies effective communication: an enterprise environment (as opposed to a physical or mechanical mechanism) implies human motivation and implies some successful progress or system outcome. As such, management is not the manipulation of a mechanism (machine or automated program), not the herding of animals, and can occur either in a legal or in an illegal enterprise or environment. From an individual's perspective, management does not need to be seen solely from an enterprise point of view, because management is a function in improving one's life and relationships. Management is seen in various parts of society.Plans, measurements, motivational psychological tools, goals, and economic measures (profit, etc.) may or may not be necessary components for there to be management. At first, one views management functionally, such as measuring quantity, adjusting plans, and meeting goals, but this applies even when planning does not take place. From this perspective, Henri Fayol (1841–1925) considers management to consist of five functions:

- planning (forecasting)
- organizing
- commanding
- coordinating
- controlling

In another way of thinking, Mary Parker Follett (1868–1933), allegedly defined management as "the art of getting things done through people". She described management as a philosophy.

Some scholars, however, find this definition useful but far too narrow. The phrase "management is what managers do" occurs widely, suggesting the difficulty of defining management without circularity, the shifting nature of definitions and the connection of managerial practices with the existence of a managerial cadre or of a class.

One habit of thought regards management as equivalent to "business administration" and thus excludes management in places outside commerce, for example, in charities and in the public sector. More broadly, every organization must "manage" its work, people, processes, technology, and other resources to maximize effectiveness. Nonetheless, many people refer to university departments that teach management as "business schools". Some such institutions (such as the Harvard Business School) use that name, while others (such as the Yale School of Management) employ the broader term "management".

English-speakers may also use the term "management" or "the management" as a collective word describing the managers of an organization, for example, of a corporation – the managementariat.

Historically, the use of the term "management" often contrasted with the term "labor" – referring to those whom management manages.

== Levels ==
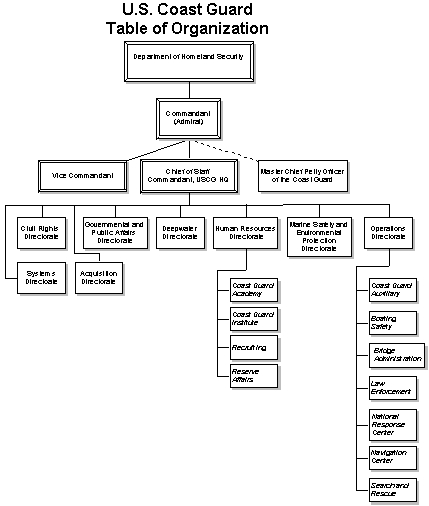
An organization chart for the United States Coast Guard shows the hierarchy of managerial roles in that organization.

=== Top management ===
The board of directors is typically composed primarily of non-executive members who owe a fiduciary duty to shareholders and are not closely involved in the day-to-day activities of the organization. However, this can vary depending on the type (e.g., public versus private), size, and culture of the organization. These directors are theoretically liable for breaches of that duty and are typically insured under directors and officers liability insurance. Fortune 500 directors are estimated to spend 4.4 hours per week on board duties, and median compensation was $212,512 in 2010. The board sets corporate strategy, makes major decisions such as major acquisitions, and hires, evaluates, and fires the top-level manager (chief executive officer or CEO). The CEO typically hires other positions. However, board involvement in hiring for other positions, such as the chief financial officer (CFO), has increased. In 2013, a survey of over 160 CEOs and directors of public and private companies found that the top weaknesses of CEOs were "mentoring skills" and "board engagement", and 10% of companies never evaluated the CEO. The board may also have certain employees (e.g., internal auditors) report to them or directly hire independent contractors; for example, the board (through the audit committee) typically selects the auditor.

Helpful skills for top management vary by organization type but typically include a broad understanding of competition, global economies, effective planning, and politics. In addition, the CEO is responsible for implementing and determining (within the board's framework) the broad policies of the organization. Executive management accomplishes the day-to-day details, including instructions for the preparation of department budgets, procedures, and schedules; appointment of middle-level executives such as department managers; coordination of departments; media and governmental relations; and shareholder communication.

=== Line management ===
Line managers include supervisors, section leaders, forepersons, and team leaders. They focus on controlling and directing regular employees, either in direct service delivery or in back-office areas of work. They are usually responsible for assigning employees tasks, guiding and supervising employees on day-to-day activities, ensuring the quality and quantity of production and/or service, making recommendations and suggestions to employees on their work, and channeling employee concerns that they cannot resolve to mid-level managers or other administrators. Low-level, frontline or "front-line" managers also act as role models for their team members. Deficits in frontline management can critically impact service delivery and customer satisfaction.

== Training and education ==
Colleges and universities worldwide offer bachelor's degrees, graduate programs, diplomas, and professional certificates in management. These programs are most commonly housed within colleges of business, business schools, or faculties of management. Still, they may also be offered in related departments such as economics, public policy, or the social sciences.

Scholars have argued that higher education played a central role in the so-called "managerial revolution" of the 20th century by formalizing managerial skills and expanding the professionalization of management as a discipline.

=== Undergraduate ===
At the undergraduate level, the most common business programs are the Bachelor of Business Administration (BBA) and Bachelor of Commerce (B.Com.). These typically comprise a four-year program that provides students with an overview of managers' roles in planning and directing within an organization. Course topics include accounting, financial management, statistics, marketing, strategy, and other related areas.

Many other undergraduate degrees include the study of management, such as Bachelor of Arts and Bachelor of Science degrees with a major in business administration or management and the Bachelor of Arts (BA) or Bachelor of Science (BS) in political science (PoliSci) with a concentration in public administration or the Bachelor of Public Administration (B.P.A), a degree designed for individuals aiming to work as bureaucrats in the government jobs. Many colleges and universities also offer certificates and diplomas in business administration or management, which typically require one to two years of full-time study.

To work in technology, one often needs an undergraduate degree in a STEM area.

=== Graduate ===
At the graduate level students aiming at careers as managers or executives may choose to specialize in major subareas of management or business administration such as entrepreneurship, human resources, international business, organizational behavior, organizational theory, strategic management, accounting, corporate finance, entertainment, global management, healthcare management, investment management, sustainability and real estate.

=== Good practices ===
While management trends can change quickly, the long-term trend in management has been defined by a market that embraces diversity and a growing service industry. Managers are currently being trained to encourage greater equality of opportunities for minorities and women in the workplace, offering increased flexibility in working hours, better retraining, and innovative (and usually industry-specific) performance markers. Managers destined for the service sector are being trained to use unique measurement techniques, better worker support, and more charismatic leadership styles. Promotion prospects can incentivise performance improvements. Human resources finds itself increasingly working with management in a training capacity to help collect management data on the success (or failure) of management actions with employees.

Good practices identified for managers include "walking the shop floor", and, especially for managers who are new in post, identifying and achieving some "quick wins" which demonstrate visible success in establishing appropriate objectives. Leadership writer John Kotter uses the phrase "Short-Term Wins" to express the same idea.

==== Evidence-based management ====
Evidence-based management is an emerging movement to use the current, best evidence in management and decision-making. It is part of the larger movement towards evidence-based practices. Evidence-based management entails managerial decisions and organizational practices informed by the best available evidence. As with other evidence-based practice, this is based on the three principles of published peer-reviewed (often in management or social science journals) research evidence that bears on whether and why a particular management practice works; judgment and experience from contextual management practice, to understand the organization and interpersonal dynamics in a situation and determine the risks and benefits of available actions; and the preferences and values of those affected.

== History ==
Some see management as a late-modern (in the sense of late modernity) conceptualization. With the changing workplaces of the Industrial Revolution in the 18th and 19th centuries, military theory and practice contributed approaches to managing the newly popular factories.

=== Early writing ===
Written in 1776 by Adam Smith, a Scottish moral philosopher, The Wealth of Nations discussed efficient organization of work through division of labour. Smith described how changes in processes could boost productivity in the manufacture of pins. While individuals could produce 200 pins per day, Smith analyzed the manufacturing steps and, with 10 specialists, enabled the production of 48,000 pins per day.

=== 19th century ===
Classical economists such as Adam Smith (1723–1790) and John Stuart Mill (1806–1873) provided a theoretical background to resource allocation, production (economics), and pricing issues. About the same time, innovators like Eli Whitney (1765–1825), James Watt (1736–1819), and Matthew Boulton (1728–1809) developed elements of technical production such as standardization, quality-control procedures, cost-accounting, interchangeability of parts, and work-planning. Many of these aspects of management existed in the pre-1861 slave-based sector of the US economy. That environment saw 4 million people, as the contemporary usages had it, "managed" in profitable quasi-mass production before wage slavery eclipsed chattel slavery.

Salaried managers as an identifiable group first became prominent in the late 19th century. As large corporations began to overshadow small family businesses, the need for personnel management positions became more necessary. Businesses grew into large corporations and the need for clerks, bookkeepers, secretaries and managers expanded. The demand for trained managers led college and university administrators to consider and implement plans to establish the first schools of business on their campuses.

=== 20th century ===
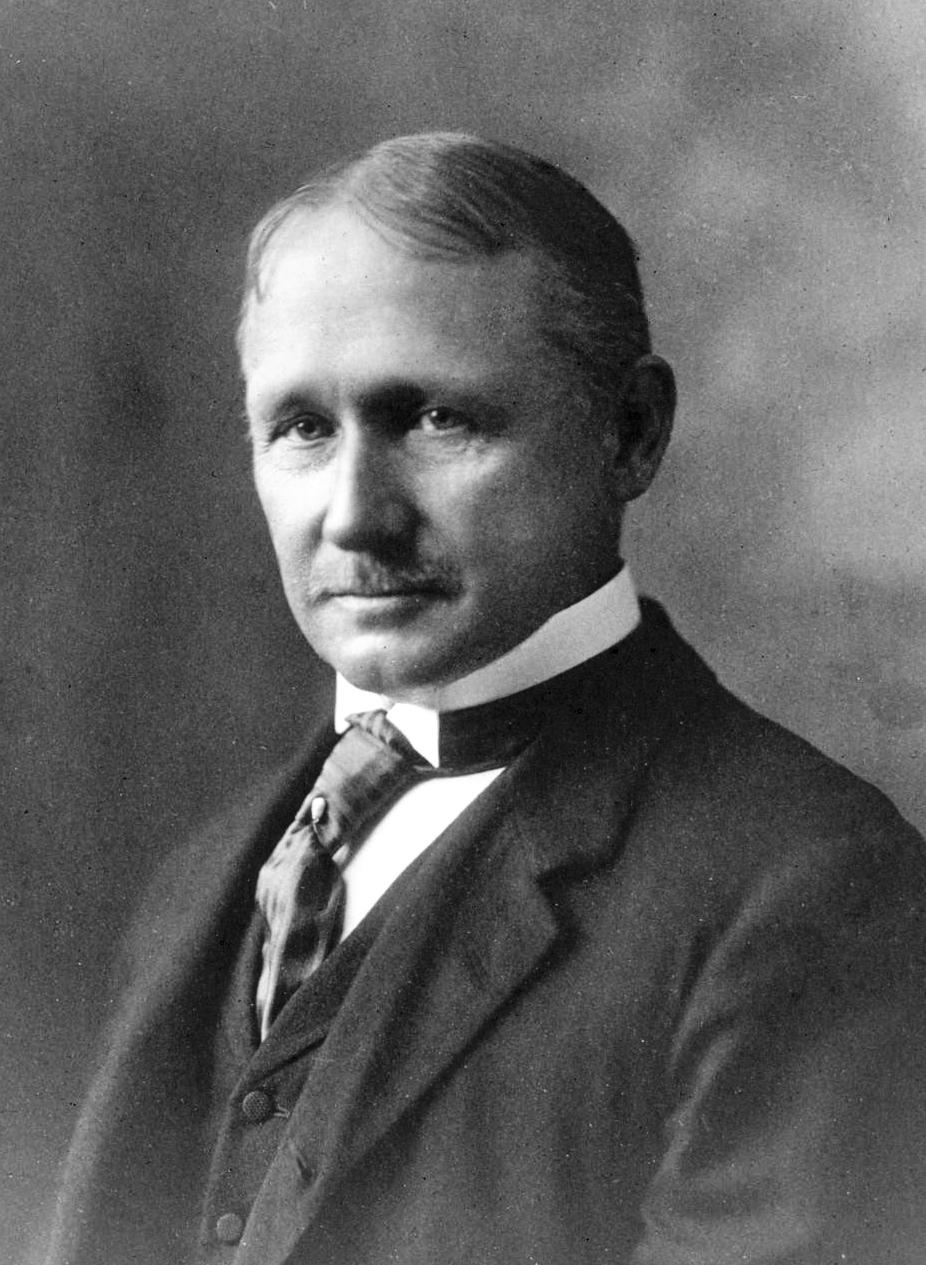
Frederick Winslow Taylor circa 1907

At the turn of the twentieth century, the need for skilled and trained managers had become increasingly apparent. The demand occurred as personnel departments began to expand rapidly. In 1915, fewer than 1 in 20 manufacturing firms had a dedicated personnel department. By 1929, that number had grown to over one-third. Formal management education became standardized at colleges and universities. Colleges and universities capitalized on the needs of corporations by forming business schools and corporate-placement departments. This shift toward formal business education marked the creation of a corporate élite in the US.

By about 1900, one finds managers trying to place their theories on what they regarded as a thoroughly scientific basis (see scientism for perceived limitations of this belief). Examples include Henry R. Towne's Science of management in the 1890s, Frederick Winslow Taylor's The Principles of Scientific Management (1911), Lillian Gilbreth's Psychology of Management (1914), Frank and Lillian Gilbreth's Applied motion study (1917), and Henry L. Gantt's charts (1910s). J. Duncan wrote the first college management textbook in 1911. In 1912 Yoichi Ueno introduced Taylorism to Japan and became the first management consultant of the "Japanese management style". His son Ichiro Ueno pioneered Japanese quality assurance.

The first comprehensive theories of management appeared around 1920. The Harvard Business School offered the first Master of Business Administration degree (MBA) in 1921. People like Henri Fayol (1841–1925) and Alexander Church (1866–1936) described the various branches of management and their inter-relationships. In the early 20th century, people like Ordway Tead (1891–1973), Walter Scott (1869–1955), and J. Mooney applied the principles of psychology to management. Other writers, such as Elton Mayo (1880–1949), Mary Parker Follett (1868–1933), Chester Barnard (1886–1961), Max Weber (1864–1920, who saw what he called the "administrator" as bureaucrat,), Rensis Likert (1903–1981), and Chris Argyris (born 1923) approached the phenomenon of management from a sociological perspective.

Peter Drucker (1909–2005) wrote one of the earliest books on applied management: Concept of the Corporation (published in 1946). It resulted from Alfred Sloan (chairman of General Motors until 1956) commissioning a study of the organization. Drucker went on to write 39 books, many of which were in the same vein.

H. Dodge, Ronald Fisher (1890–1962), and Thornton C. Fry introduced statistical techniques into management studies. In the 1940s, Patrick Blackett worked on developing the applied-mathematics science of operations research, initially for military operations. Operations research, sometimes known as "management science" (but distinct from Taylor's scientific management), attempts to take a scientific approach to solving decision-problems and can apply directly to multiple management problems, particularly in the areas of logistics and operations.

Some of the later 20th-century developments include the theory of constraints (introduced in 1984), management by objectives (systematized in 1954), the Harzburg Model (developed by Reinhard Höhn in post-war Germany), re-engineering (the early 1990s), Six Sigma (1986), management by walking around (1970s), the Viable system model (1972), and various information-technology-driven theories such as agile software development (so-named from 2001), as well as group-management theories such as Cog's Ladder (1972) and the notion of "thriving on chaos" (1987).

As the general recognition of managers as a class solidified during the 20th century, it conferred a certain amount of prestige on perceived practitioners of the art/science of management. Hence, the way opened for popularised systems of management ideas to peddle their wares. In this context, many management fads may have had more to do with pop psychology than with scientific theories of management.

Business management includes the following branches:

1. financial management
2. human resource management
3. management cybernetics
4. information technology management (responsible for management information systems )
5. marketing management
6. operations management and production management
7. strategic management

=== 21st century ===
Branches of management theory also exist relating to nonprofits and to government: such as public administration, public management, and educational management. Further, management programs related to civil society organizations have also given rise to programs in nonprofit management and social entrepreneurship.

Many of the assumptions made by management have come under attack from business-ethics viewpoints, critical management studies, and anti-corporate activism. This could include violations to a company's ethics policy.

As one consequence, workplace democracy (sometimes referred to as Workers' self-management) has become both more common and more advocated, in some places distributing all management functions among workers, each of whom takes on a portion of the work. However, these models predate any current political issue and may occur more naturally than does a command hierarchy.

== Nature of work ==
In profitable organizations, management's primary function is to satisfy a range of stakeholders. This typically involves making a profit (for the shareholders), creating valued products at a reasonable cost (for customers), and providing great employment opportunities for employees. In nonprofit management, one of the main functions is to keep the faith of donors. In most models of management and governance, shareholders vote for the board of directors, and the board then hires senior management. Some organizations have experimented with other methods (such as employee-voting models) of selecting or reviewing managers, but this is rare.

== Topics ==
=== Basics ===
According to Fayol, management operates through five basic functions: planning, organizing, commanding, coordinating, and controlling.

- Planning: Deciding what needs to happen in the future and generating action plans (deciding in advance).
- Organizing (or staffing): Making sure the human and nonhuman resources are put into place.
- Commanding (or leading): Determining what must be done in a situation and getting people to do it.
- Coordinating: Creating a structure through which an organization's goals can be accomplished.
- Controlling: Checking progress against plans.

== See also ==
- Certificate in Management Studies
- Engineering management
- Outline of management
- Outline of business management
