= Management by observation =

Management by observation has two unrelated meanings:

1. Managing diseases by observing the progress of patient over a period of time to determine if the observed would benefit from intervention.
2. Management of employees by observing that they are present at the physical work place during accepted working hours and appear to be doing expected work tasks. Without objective setting may lead to presenteeism.

== See also ==
- Flextime
- Flexplace
- Management by objectives
