= Hands-on management =

Hands-on management is a particular style of management where the manager or person in charge is particularly active in day-to-day business and leadership. It is not to be confused with micromanagement and is seen as the opposite of Laissez-faire management style.

== Purpose ==
Hands-on includes traits and actions such as:

- Understanding of the business and shows interest
- Informed but passive with ideas
- Follows up on agreed decisions

The opposite to hands-on is a hands-off manager or management style.

== See also ==
- Outline of management
