= List of national quality awards =

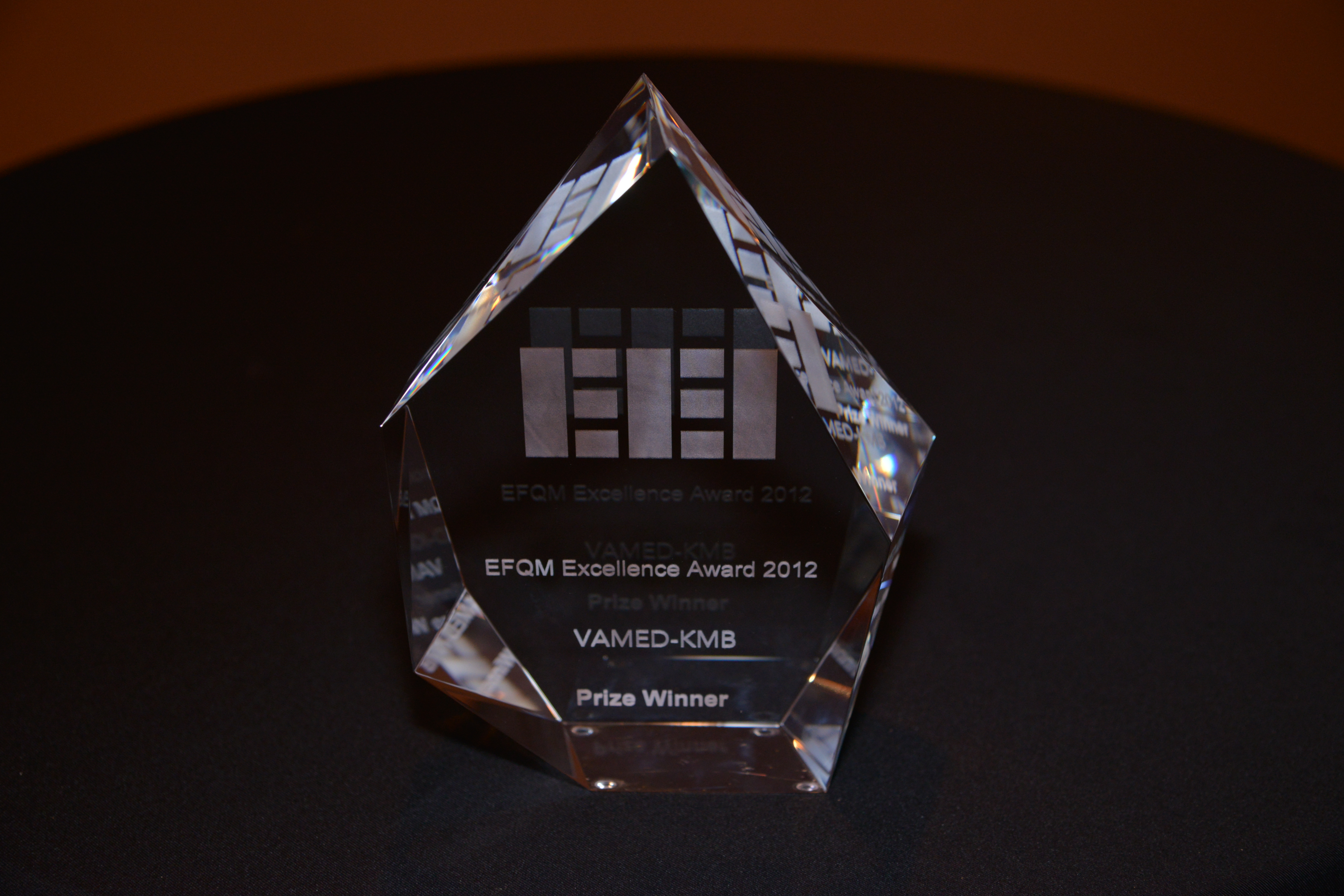
An EFQM Excellence Award from 2012

This list of national quality awards is an index to articles about notable national awards for quality, typically associated with business and manufacturing.

== Background ==
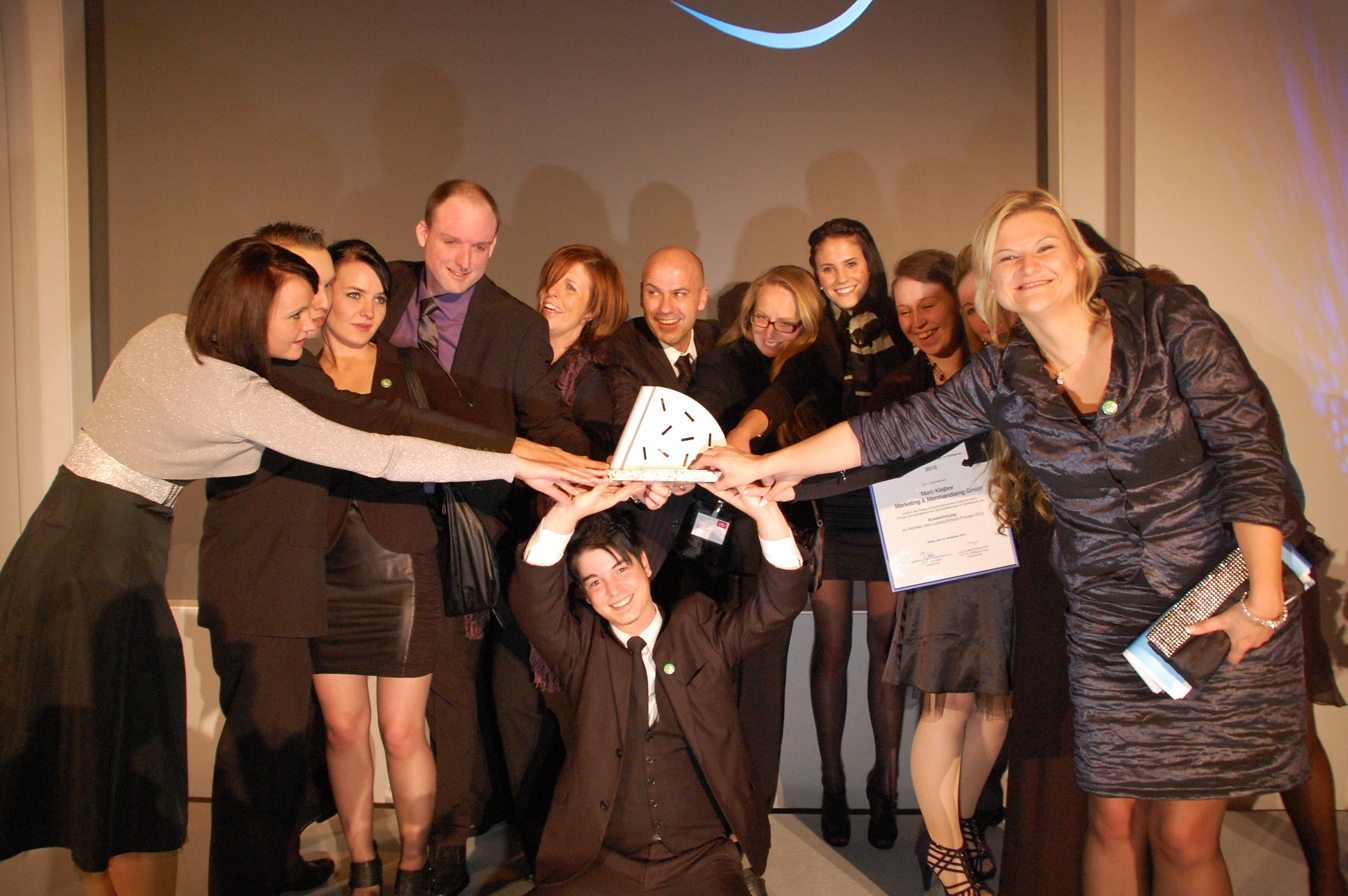
Ludwig-Erhard-Preis 2010

A national quality award is typically part of a larger effort by a government to make its country's businesses more competitive in the world economy. The awarding institutions are generally either government departments or ministries (Note: For example, the Bureau of Indian Standards is part of the Ministry of Consumer Affairs, Food and Public Distribution in India.) or not-for-profit organizations with government ties. (Note: For example, the Association France Qualité Performance is affiliated with the Minister of the Economy, Finances and Industry in France.) In many countries, however, the awarding institutions are consortia of businesses. (Note: For example, the pt:Fundação Nacional da Qualidade was founded by 39 different private and public organizations.) Candidate companies compete in award-specific assessments of business quality and excellence criteria. The assessments are annual and firms who wish to be considered for the awards file applications with the organization that conducts the competition in their home country. Competitors are evaluated by teams of examiners who are volunteers in Germany, the United Kingdom, the United States, and possibly elsewhere. Several examiners separately evaluate company submissions against award criteria after which they meet to discuss their findings and to agree on a consensus score. The highest scoring firms advance to the next phase where examiners perform site visits to compare actual practices against those reported in the company submission and finally, awards are given to companies whose practices best fulfill the criteria of the award models.

While each nation's awards programs only consider businesses within its national borders, there are two notable exceptions: The EFQM Excellence Award is a transnational award open to businesses operating in one or more European countries and the Deming Prize, which began as the Japan Quality Medal, became the first (and as of 2014 the only) global quality award in 1984.

The most widely recognized quality awards are the Deming Prize (the first of its kind) and the EFQM Excellence and Malcolm Baldrige National Quality Awards (due to their size). The national quality award phenomenon grew out of the Total Quality Management movement of the 1980s.

== Awards ==
National quality awards
Name	Region	Country	Administering organization	Began
Australian Business Excellence Awards	Oceania	Australia	SAI Global (Note: This award was administered by the not-for-profit organization Standards Australia until 2003, when parts of Standards Australia were spun off as a for-profit company.)	1988
Belgian Business Excellence Award	Europe	Belgium	Flemish Quality Management Center	1990
Canada Awards for Excellence	North America	Canada	Excellence Canada	1989 (Note: While the Canada Awards for Excellence were established in 1984, quality was not awarded as a separate category until 1989.)
China Quality Award	Asia	China	China Association for Quality	2001
Deming Prize	Asia	Japan	Union of Japanese Scientists and Engineers	1951
Dubai Government Excellence Award	Middle East	UAE	Dubai Government Excellence Program	1997
Dutch Quality Assessment	Europe	Netherlands	Instituut Nederland Kwaliteit	1990
EFQM Excellence Award	Europe		EFQM	1992
Egypt Government Excellence Award	Africa	Egypt	Ministry of Planning	2018
Fiji Business Excellence Awards	Oceania	Fiji	National Training and Productivity Centre	1998
ESPRIX Swiss Award for Excellence	Europe	Switzerland	Stiftung ESPRIX	
Government Excellence Model	Middle East	UAE	Sheikh Khalifa Government Excellence Program	2009
Indonesian Quality Award	Asia	Indonesia	Indonesian Quality Award Foundation	
Iran National Quality Award	Asia	Iran	Institute of Standards and Industrial Research of Iran	
National Quality and Excellence Prize	Asia	Israel	Standards Institute of Israel	1989
King Abdulaziz Quality Award	Asia	Saudi Arabia	Saudi Standards, Metrology and Quality Organization	
King Abdullah II Award for Government Excellence Award	Middle East	Jordan	King Abdullah II Center for Excellence	2006
Korean National Quality Management Award	Asia	South Korea	Korean Standards Association	
de:Ludwig-Erhard-Preis (ILEP)	Europe	Germany	de:Deutsche Gesellschaft für Qualität and Verein Deutscher Ingenieure	1997
Luxembourgish Award for Quality and Excellence	Europe	Luxemburg	MLQE	2004
Malcolm Baldrige National Quality Award	North America	United States	National Institute of Standards and Technology	1988
Prime Minister Quality Award	Asia	Pakistan	National Productivity Organization	2006
Philippine Quality Award	Asia	Philippines	Center for Industrial Competitiveness	1998
pl:Polska Nagroda Jakości	Europe	Poland	Sekretariat Polskiej Nagrody Jakości	1995
es:Premio Colombiano a la Calidad de la Gestión	South America	Colombia	es:Ministerio de Comercio, Industria y Turismo de Colombia	1992
Premio Nacional a la Calidad	South America	Argentina	Fundación Premio Nacional a la Calidad	1992
Premio Nacional a la Calidad	South America	Chile	es:Confederación de la Producción y del Comercio	
pt:Prêmio Nacional da Qualidade	South America	Brazil	pt:Fundação Nacional da Qualidade	1992
es:Premio Nacional de Calidad	North America	Mexico	Instituto para el Fomento a la Calidad Total	1990
Premio Qualità Italia	Europe	Italy	Associazione Premio Qualità Italia	1997
es:Premios Príncipe Felipe a la Excelencia Empresarial	Europe	Spain	es:Ministerio de Industria, Energía y Turismo	1993
Prime Minister's Quality Award	Asia	Malaysia	Prime Minister of Malaysia	
Prix France Qualité Performance	Europe	France	Association France Qualité Performance	2000
Rajiv Gandhi National Quality Award	Asia	India	Bureau of Indian Standards	1992
IMC Ramkrishna Bajaj National Quality Award	Asia	India	IMC Chamber of Commerce & Industry	1997
Russian Government Quality Award	Europe	Russia	Secretariat of the Russian Government Quality Award Board	1997
Singapore Business Excellence Awards	Asia	Singapore	SPRING Singapore	1995
Thailand Quality Award	Asia	Thailand	Thailand Productivity Institute (FTPI)	1996
TÜSİAD-KalDer National Quality Awards	Asia	Turkey	Turkish Industrialists' and Businessmen's Association	
UK Business Excellence Award	Europe	United Kingdom	British Quality Foundation	1994
Utmärkelsen Svensk Kvalitet	Europe	Sweden	SIQ Institutet för Kvalitetsutveckling	1992
India 5000 Best MSME Awards	Asia	India	India 5000 Business Awards	2016
Benchmark National Quality Award	Asia	India	Benchmark National Quality Award	2025

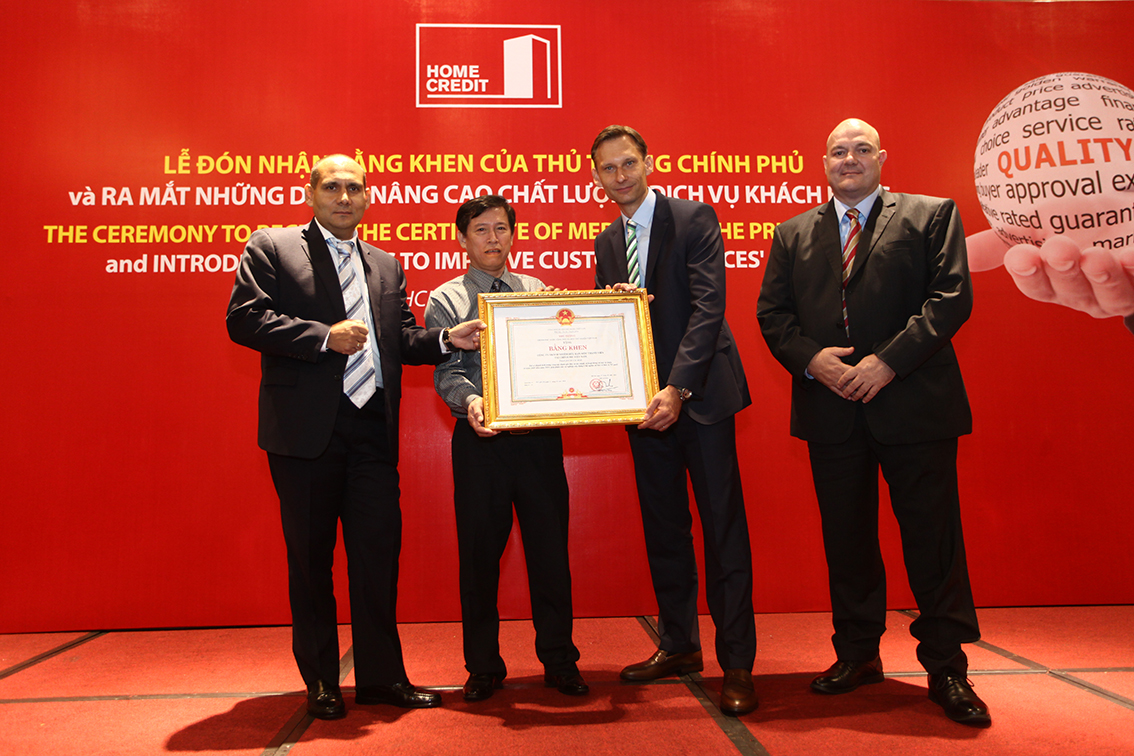
Executives of Home Credit receive a "Certificate of Merit" for customer service and quality from a Vietnamese government official on behalf of Prime Minister Nguyễn Tấn Dũng in 2014.

== See also ==
- Category:Business and industry awards
- Global Competitiveness Report
- List of business and industry awards
- Total quality management
