= DQS (disambiguation) =

DQS can refer to:

- Data Quality Services, a business intelligence service for Microsoft SQL Server
- DQS Holding GmbH, a German company providing assessments and certifications of management systems and processes (Deutsche Gesellschaft zur Zertifizierung von Qualitätssicherungssystemen). (Not to be confused with Deutsche Gesellschaft für Qualität or DGQ)
- de Quervain syndrome, a mucoid degeneration of two tendons that control movement of the thumb and their tendon sheath
- Ducati Quick Shift, a gear shift system used on the Ducati 848 and Ducati SuperSport which allows for upshifts without using the clutch lever for faster acceleration
- dQS, the derivative of quantity supplied (QS), a term used in quantity adjustment in market supply analysis within economics
