= Rajiv Gandhi National Quality Award =

National award for TQM

- Awarded for: Recognising Indian businesses for excellence in applying the principles of Total Quality Management
- Sponsored by: Bureau of Indian Standards
- Country: India
- First award: 1992
- Website: www.bis.org.in/other/rgnqa_geninfo.htm

The Rajiv Gandhi National Quality Award is the national quality award given by the Bureau of Indian Standards to Indian organisations that show excellence in their performance. It is named after Rajiv Gandhi, the former Prime Minister of India, and was introduced in 1991 after his death. The award aims to promote quality services to the consumers and to give special recognition to organisations that contribute significantly towards the quality movement of India.

The award is presented annually as per the financial year, and is similar to other national quality awards worldwide like the Malcolm Baldrige National Quality Award of the United States, European Quality Award of the European Union and the Deming Prize of Japan.

== Awards ==
The award is presented to organisations in five broad categories: large scale manufacturing, small scale manufacturing, large scale service sector, small scale service sector and best overall. Furthermore, there are 14 commendation certificates for organisations showing excellence in various fields, including but not limited to biotechnology, chemicals, electronics, food and drugs, metallurgy, textiles, jewelry, education, finance, healthcare and information technology.

Apart from the certificated and awards, the winner of Best of All gets a monetary prize of ₹500,000 (US$5,300), while the other four awards carry a cash prize of ₹200,000 (US$2,100). The commendation certificate carries a financial incentive of ₹100,000 (US$1,100).

"Best of all" winners
Year	Recipient
1991–92	Kirloskar Cummins Limited, Pune
1993	Steel Authority of India Limited Bhilai Steel Plant, Bhilai
1994	ITC Limited ILTD Division Chirala (A.P.)
1995	ITC Limited ILTD Division, Anaparti, Andhra Pradesh
1996	Tata Bearings (A Division of TISCO), Kharagpur, West Bengal
1997	Larsen & Toubro Limited, Bangalore Works, Bangalore (Karnataka); Ammunition Factory, Khadki Pune, Maharashtra
1998	Mathura Refinery of Indian Corporation Limited, Mathura
1999	Gujarat Co-operative Milk Marketing Federation Limited, Anand; Tata Cummins Limited, Jamshedpur
2000	Tata International Limited, Dewas
2001	Birla Cellulosic, Bharuch
2002	(No award)
2003	Indian Oil Corporation Ltd (Gujarat Refinery), Vadodara; Grasim Industries Ltd (Chemical Division), Nagda
2005	Moser Baer India Limited, Greater Noida
2006	Steel Authority of India Limited Bhilai Steel Plant, Bhilai
2007	Steel Authority of India Limited Bokaro Steel Plant, Bokaro
2008	Satluj Jal Vidyut Nigam Limited, Shimla, Himachal Pradesh.
2009	Tata Motors Limited, Lucknow, Uttar Pradesh
2010	Vikram Cement Works (A unit of UltraTech Cement Limited), Khor, Madhya Pradesh
2011	DAV ACC Senior Secondary Public School Barmana, Himachal Pradesh
2012	Rail Wheel factory, Yelahanka, Bangalore
2013	Navjaat Bhaskar
2014	Larsen & Toubro Limited

== See also ==
- List of national quality awards
- Total Quality Management
