= Magdolna Csath =

Hungarian economist

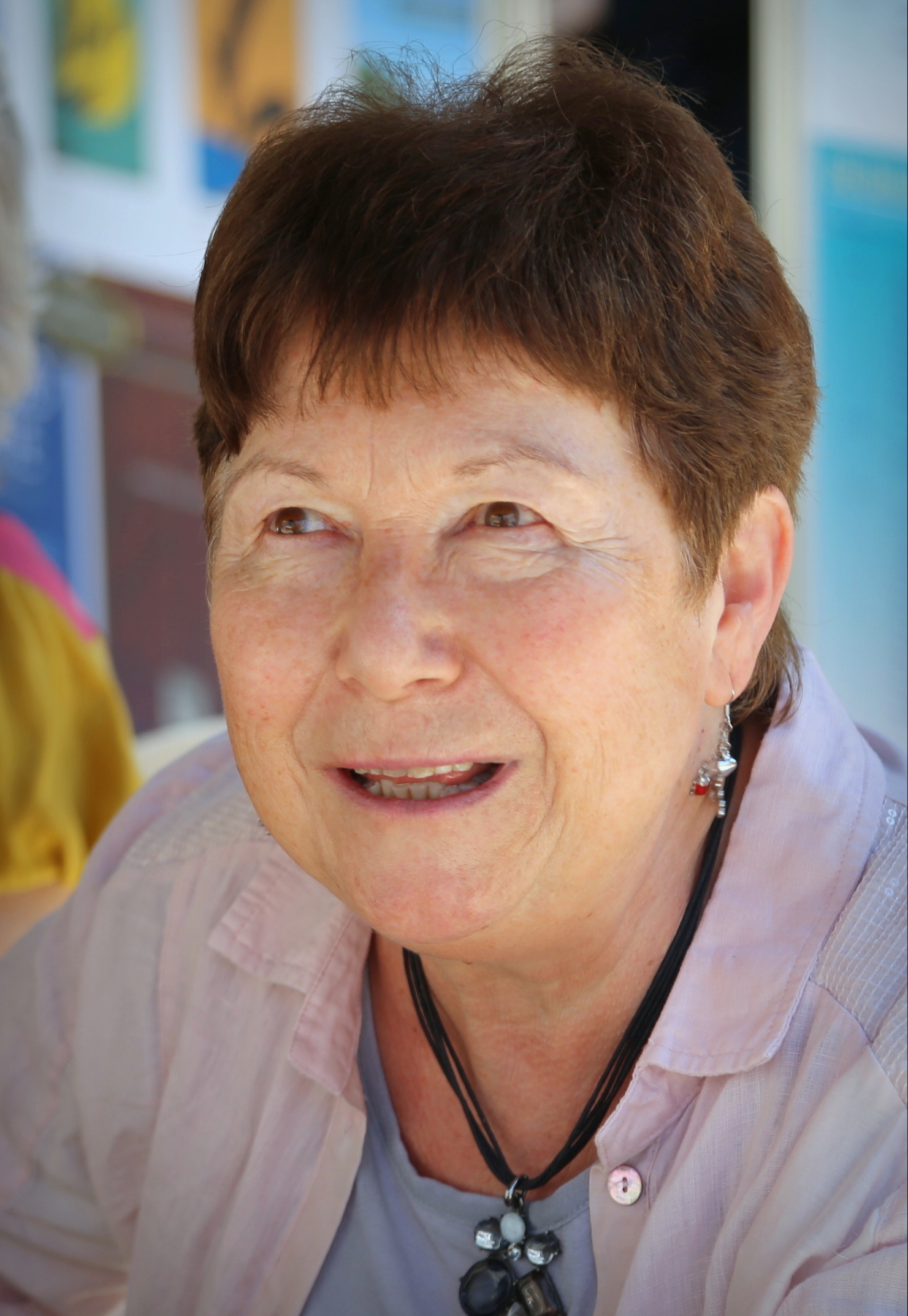
- Magdolna in 2018
- Born: December 15, 1943 (age 82); Újpest, Budapest, Hungary
- Education: London Business School (1969-1971) Eötvös Loránd University (1967-1968) Corvinus University of Budapest (1962-1966)
- Occupation: Professor at Pázmány Péter Catholic University Doctor of Economics at the Budapest University of Economics

Magdolna Csath (born December 15, 1943) is a former Hungarian academic economist and research professor at Pázmány Péter Catholic University.

== Education ==
She graduated from Marx Károly University of Economics in 1966, and studied applied mathematics at Eötvös Loránd University in 1967 and 1968. In 1972 and 1973, she completed the MBA program at London Business School. Since 1996, she has been a doctor of economics at the Budapest University of Economics. She received her doctorate in economics from the Hungarian Academy of Sciences in 1991.

== Career ==
In 1986, she became a professor at the Virginia Polytechnic Institute and State University. In 1990, she switched to Old Dominion University, but returned to Europe a year later and took up a professorship at the Scottish University of Stirling. A year later, she returned to Hungary, where she worked at the University of West Hungary in Sopron. She later took over the management of the economics department at the Kodolányi János University in Székesfehérvár, where she later retired.

== Awards and recognitions ==
- Szent-Györgyi Albert Prize: Received in 2008
- Pest megye Önkormányzata Tudományos Díja: Received in 2008 and 2013
- Wekerle Sándor Tudományos Életmű Díj: Received in 2015
- A magyar gazdaságért: Received in 2015
- A Magyar Érdemrend tisztikeresztje: Received in 2015
- A Magyar Érdemrend középkeresztje: Received in 2023
- Az év legjobb vezetési-közgazdaságtani szakkönyve díj: Received in 1984 for her book A Stratégiai Tervezés
- L. J. Buchan Distinguished Professor” cím és díj: Received in 1990–91 in the USA
