= Excellence Canada =

- Founded: 1992
- Founder: John Perry
- Type: Nonprofit organization
- Purpose: Organizational improvement
- Headquarters: 402 - 154 University Avenue; Toronto, Ontario
- Location: Toronto, Ontario, Canada
- Coordinates: 43.64838°N 79.38520°W
- Region served: Canada
- Method: Training, consultation, certification
- Key people: Allan Ebedes, President & CEO; Dr. Adam Stoehr, Vice President Educational Services; Russ Gahan, Vice President, Operations
- Website: www.excellence.ca
- Formerly called: National Quality Institute

Excellence Canada is a nonprofit organization that specializes in the training, implementation and certification of organizational excellence in Canada. Excellence Canada is also the custodian and adjudicator of the Canada Awards for Excellence, under the Patronage of David Johnston C.C., C.M.M., C.O.M., C.D., the Governor General of Canada.

== History ==
Established in 1992 through start-up funding provided by Industry Canada, Excellence Canada (then the National Quality Institute) was formed as a nonprofit partnership between the government of Canada and leading private sector organizations to provide strategic focus and direction for Canadian organizations. In this endeavour, Excellence Canada established the Canadian Framework for Business Excellence in conjunction with Industry Canada and quality experts across Canada.

Recent developments include an Excellence, Innovation and Wellness Standard, a Healthy Workplace Standard and a Mental Health at Work Framework as a part of their Canadian Business Excellence Model. The University of Waterloo was selected to pilot the introduction of Excellence Canada's Excellence, Innovation and Wellness standard during its inception in 2014.

== Awards ==
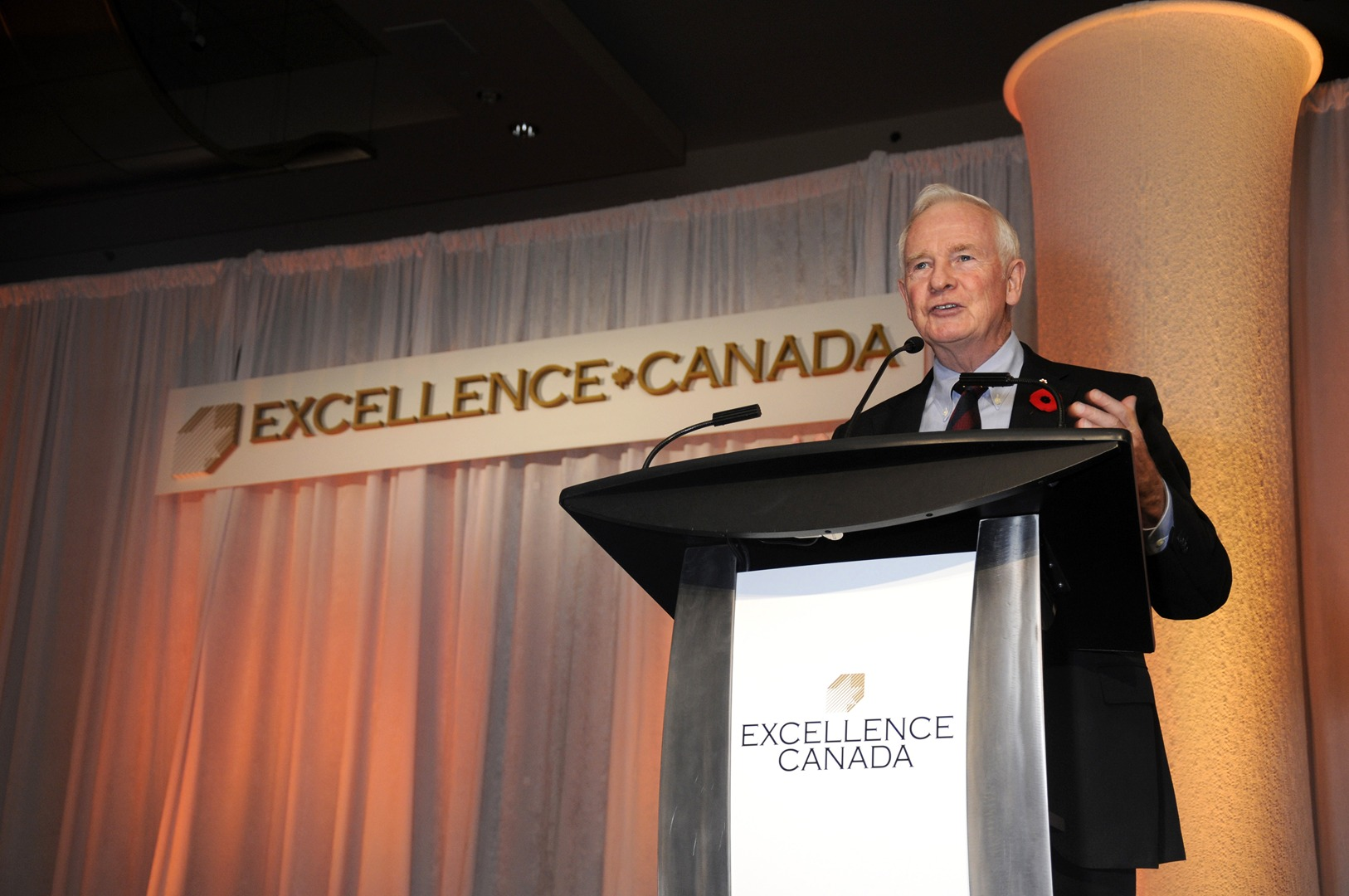
David Johnston speaking at the Excellence Summit in 2012

The Canada Awards for Excellence are internationally recognized as the national quality award for Canada. In its patronage of this award, Excellence Canada is akin to the likes of the National Institute of Standards and Technology, who preside over the Malcolm Baldrige National Quality Award in the United States, and the Union of Japanese Scientists and Engineers (JUSE), who govern the Deming Prize in Japan. Past recipients of the Canada Awards for Excellence include the Workplace Safety & Insurance Board, Ricoh, the City of Markham, Ontario Region of Peel, Diversicare, Hill+Knowlton Strategies, Manulife Calian, Ceridian, and Sun Life Financial.

In 2009, Michaëlle Jean, then Governor General of Canada, received the Special Recognition of Achievement Award for her dedication to women, children and Aboriginal people.

== See also ==
- Canada Awards for Excellence
- List of national quality awards
- Total Quality Management
