= Legality =

Consistency with the law of a jurisdiction

Legality is the state of being consistent with the law, the construct of legal power, or lawfulness in a given jurisdiction.

== Definition ==
In contract law, legality of purpose is required of every enforceable contract. One can not validate or enforce a contract to do activity with unlawful purpose.

== Principle of legality ==
The principle that no one be convicted of a crime without a written legal text which clearly describes the crime is widely accepted and codified in modern democratic states as a basic requirement of the rule of law. It is known in Latin as nulla poena sine lege.

Nulla poena sine lege is a principle of international human rights law and is incorporated into the Universal Declaration of Human Rights, the International Covenant on Civil and Political Rights and the European Convention on Human Rights. Exceptionally under international law, criminal offences may include violations of "the general principles of law recognized by civilized nations", such as genocide, war crimes and crimes against humanity, even if such offences are not codified or affirmed in judicial precedent. Following the Nuremberg trials, scholars of jurisprudence have debated whether such exceptions are valid for apparently applying retrospective criminal sanctions in the absence of written law. Natural-law theorists argue that crimes such as genocide are, and have always been, illegal under natural law.

== By jurisdiction ==
=== United Kingdom ===
In the United Kingdom under the doctrine of Parliamentary sovereignty, the legislature can (in theory) pass such retrospective laws as it sees fit, though article 7 of the European Convention on Human Rights, which has legal force in Britain, forbids conviction for a crime which was not illegal at the time it was committed.

=== United States ===
In the United States, laws may not violate the stated provisions of the United States Constitution, which includes a prohibition on retrospective laws.

== Feminist theory ==
Feminist theories of law define legality a distinct but related concept to the law, consisting of socially-constructed meanings and practices that depend on social forces, such as race, gender, and class. Ewick and Sibley define "legality" as "those meanings, sources of authority, and cultural practices that are commonly recognized as legal, although not necessarily approved nor acknowledged by law."

== See also ==
- Analytical jurisprudence
- Legal positivism
- Principle of legality in French criminal law
- Sources of law

== Bibliography ==
- Kelsen, Hans. General Theory of Law and State (Cambridge, Massachusetts: Harvard University Press, c. 1945) (Cambridge, Massachusetts: Harvard University Press, 1949) (New York: Russell & Russell, 1961) (New Brunswick, New Jersey: Transaction Publishers, c. 2006).
- Kelsen, Hans. Principles of international law (New York: Rinehart, 1952) (New York: Holt, Rinehart & Winston, 1966) (Clark, New Jersey: Lawbook Exchange, 2003).
- Slaughter, Anne-Marie. A new world order (Princeton: Princeton University Press, c. 2004).
- Nye, Joseph S. Soft power (New York : Public Affairs, c2004).
- de Sousa Santos, Boaventura, and Rodríguez-Garavito, César A., eds. Law and globalization from below: towards a cosmopolitan legality (Cambridge, UK: Cambridge University Press, 2005)
- Marsh, James L. Unjust legality: a critique of Habermas's philosophy of law (Lanham: Rowman & Littlefield, c. 2001).
- Sarat, Austin, et al., eds. The limits of law (Stanford: Stanford University Press, 2005).
- Milano, Enrico. Unlawful territorial situations in international law: reconciling effectiveness, legality and legitimacy (Leiden; Boston: M. Nijhoff, c. 2006).
- Ackerman, Bruce, ed. Bush v. Gore: the question of legitimacy (New Haven: Yale University Press, c. 2002).
- Gabriel Hallevy A Modern Treatise on the Principle of Legality in Criminal Law (Heidelberg: Springer-Heidelberg, c. 2010).
