= DGQ =

DGQ may refer to:

- David Grisman Quintet, an American jazz band
- Dublin Guitar Quartet, an Irish guitar quartet
- Deutsche Gesellschaft für Qualität, a German quality management organization
