= Kostka College Santander =

Coordinates: 43°27′48.9″N 3°48′18.58″W

- Santander, Cantabria, Spain

Information
- Type: Jesuit, Catholic
- Established: 1960; 66 years ago
- Grades: Infant through baccalaureate
- Gender: Coeducational
- Website: Kostka College Santander

Kostka College Santander, Cantabria, Spain, was founded by the Society of Jesus in 1960 and gradually grew to include pre-primary through baccalaureate. It is named for the young Jesuit saint Stanislaus Kostka. It began offering the baccalaureate under the name Institute Jose Maria Pereda, but in 1968 it began expanding its offerings and took its present name.

Kostka is the first organization in Cantabria and only eleventh educational institution in Spain to receive the silver seal according to the EFQM Excellence Model for organizational excellence. The evaluation was done by Bureau Veritas.

== See also ==
- List of Jesuit sites
