= Kodolányi János University =

Higher education institution in Hungary

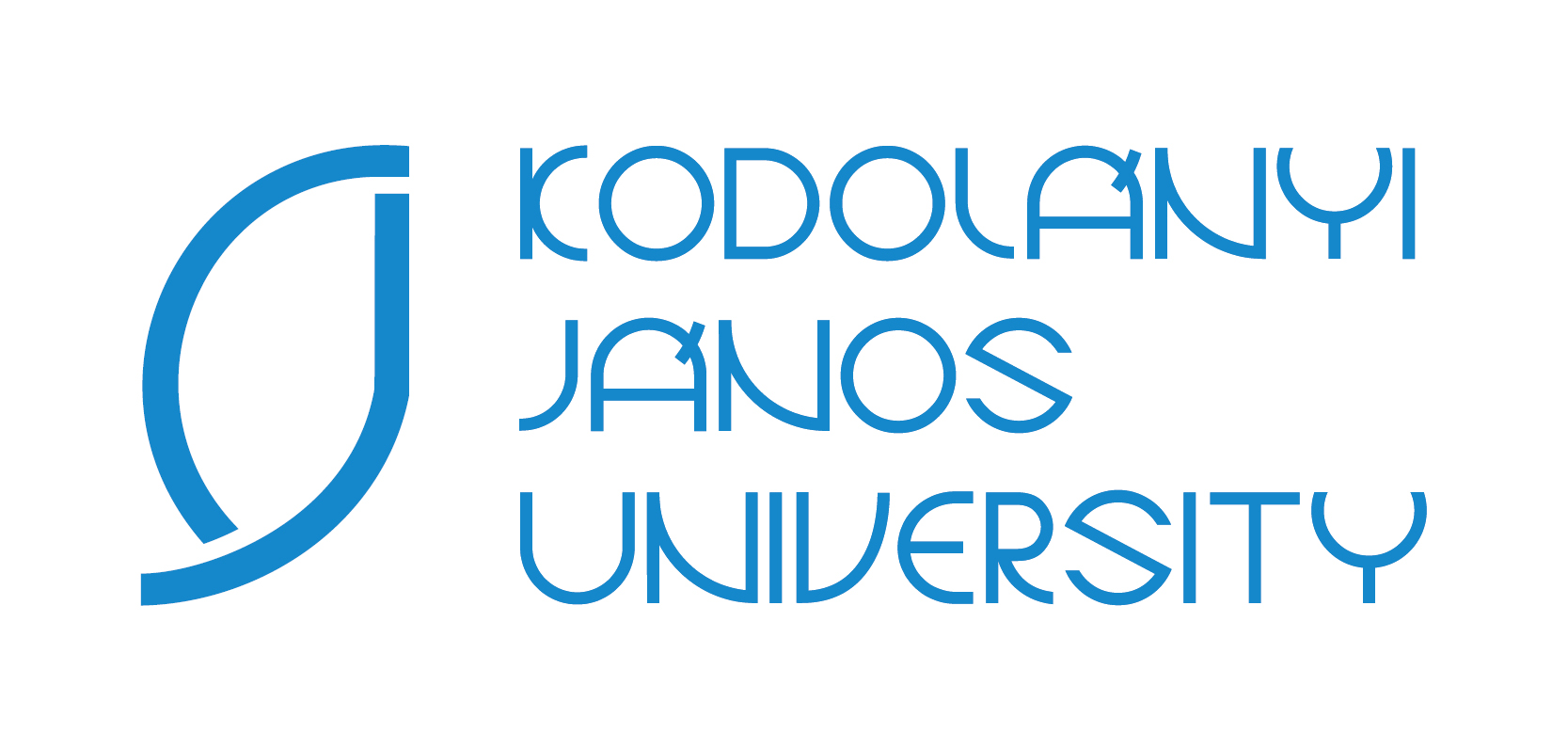
- Motto: Együtt valóra váltjuk
- Motto in English: Together We Can
- Type: Private
- Established: 1992; 34 years ago
- Founder: Dr. Szabó Péter Ottó
- Rector: Dr. Vizi László Tamás (acting)
- Students: 3,000
- Location: Budapest, Hungary
- Campus: Multiple sites
- Language: English, Hungarian
- Colors: Blue and white
- Website: www.kodolanyi.hu/en/

Kodolányi János University (Hungarian: Kodolányi János Egyetem or KJU) is a private higher education institution in Hungary with its main campus in Budapest. It has regional campuses in Székesfehérvár and Orosháza. KJU is among the earliest private higher education institutions created in Hungary following the collapse of the communist regime.

As of 2023, Kodolányi János University has 3000 students organised into fourteen departments. It offers Bachelor's and Master's programmes in Hungarian and English. It has a library on each of its three campuses, which cater to domestic as well as international students. The university has international partnerships with institutions from 36 countries.

== History ==
The institution was established in Székesfehérvár in 1992, following the plans of Lajos Rockenbauer and Péter Szabó, with the support of Bertalan Andrásfalvy, former Minister of Education. It was named after writer János Kodolányi due to his contributions to the city. In 1994, the institution started its own local radio station. Its Budapest campus was inaugurated in 1998. The Orosháza campus was opened in 2004. It is the first university in Székesfehérvár, and has operated as a college until July 31, 2018. After serving as rector for twenty years, Péter Szabó has not sought re-election in 2023. The faculty senate is currently headed by Acting Rector Dr. Tamás László Vizi.

In 2020, Kodolányi János University was acquired by Docler Holding, a corporate group focused on information technology. In 2023, the university has been integrated into the educational portfolio of a Székesfehérvár-based holding company, Albensis Tudásközpont. The new management aims to reassess the university's strategic priorities.

== Organisation and administration ==
The Rector of Kodolányi János University is the head administrator, appointed and overseen by the academic board. The university is divided into five major institutes.

- The Institute for Social Well-Being includes the Departments of English Language and Literature, Human Development Studies, International Relations, History and Cultural Studies.
- The Institute for Sustainable Economy includes the Departments of Business and Management, as well as Tourism and Logistics.
- The Institute for Informatics includes the Department of Informatics.
- The Institute for Creative Industries includes the Departments of Communication and Media Studies, Cinematography and Television Art, and Contemporary Music.
- The Institute for International Relations includes the Department of Interdisciplinary International Studies as well as the Centre of International Development and Services.

== Notable alumni ==
- György Gattyán, businessman
- Gergely Böszörményi Nagy, entrepreneur
- Sarolta Kovács, pentathlete
- András Nemény, jurist and politician
- Barbara Schoblocher, lead singer of Blahalouisiana
- Péter Juhász, activist and politician

== Awards and recognitions ==
- European Foundation for Quality Management - Recognised for Excellence 5* - 2006
