= Motosaburo Masuyama =

Japanese statistician (1912–2005)

- Born: October 3, 1912; Otaru, Empire of Japan
- Died: July 3, 2005 (aged 92)
- Education: Imperial University of Tokyo
- Occupation: Statistician
- Honours: Asahi Prize, Deming Prize

Motosaburo Masuyama (増山 元三郎, Masuyama Motosaburō; October 3, 1912 – 3 July 2005) was a Japanese statistician who championed the ideas of R.A. Fisher and went on to influence the fields of quality control and biometrics.

== Life ==
Born Otaru, Hokkaidō, Masuyama graduated in physics from the Imperial University of Tokyo in 1937 and earned his doctorate in 1943. Characterising Fisher's approach to statistics as the science of inference and planning, Masuyama worked across a wide range of agencies including: the Japan Meteorological Agency; the University of Tokyo School of Medicine; the Institute of Statistical Mathematics; the Indian Statistical Institute, where he collaborated with Fisher, another frequent visitor; the Ministry of Public Health and Welfare, where his teaching in design of experiments profoundly influenced the young Genichi Taguchi; the University of North Carolina, and The Catholic University of America. In 1970, he joined the applied mathematics department at the University of Tokyo and remained there until his retirement in 1988.

Masuyama held many radical views on the application of statistics to human biology.

== Honours ==
- Asahi Prize, (1948)
- Deming Prize, (1951)
