= Mathura Refinery =

Oil refinery in Uttar Pradesh, India

- Location of the Mathura Refinery in Uttar Pradesh Mathura Refinery (India)
- Location: Mathura, Uttar Pradesh, India; 27°22′41.9″N 77°41′11.2″E

Refinery details
- Owner: Indian Oil Corporation Limited
- Opened: January 19, 1982
- Capacity: 8 MMTPA

The Mathura Refinery, owned by Indian Oil Corporation, is the sixth oil refinery of IndianOil located in Mathura, Uttar Pradesh, India. The refinery processes low sulphur crude from Bombay High, imported low sulphur crude from Nigeria, and high sulphur crude from the Middle East. Originally designed for a processing capacity of 6.0 million tonnes per year, it was expanded to 7.5 million tonnes in 1989 through debottlenecking and the addition of a DHDS unit, and now processes 8.0 million tonnes annually. The refinery received the "Best of All" Rajiv Gandhi National Quality Award in 1998 and began producing BS VI standard fuels for the Delhi NCR ahead of the April 2020 mandate. On 12 November 2024, a fire and explosion in the Atmospheric Vacuum Unit during start‑up injured eight personnel but was quickly extinguished with minimal impact on overall operations.

== History ==
The refinery, which cost Rs.253.92 crores to build, was commissioned on 19 January 1982. Construction began on the refinery in October 1972. The foundation stone was laid by Indira Gandhi, the former prime minister of India. The FCCU and Sulphur Recovery Units were commissioned in January 1983. The refinery was commissioned with a refining capacity of 6.0 million tonnes per year and the refining capacity of this refinery was expanded to 7.5 million tonnes per year in 1989 by debottlenecking and revamping. A DHDS Unit was commissioned in 1989 for production of HSD with low sulphur content of 0.25% wt. (max.). The present refining capacity of this refinery is 8.00 million tonnes per year.

In January 2009, the plant shut down for a period of time due to a strike. In 1998 the plant was awarded the "Best of all" Rajiv Gandhi National Quality Award. Presently Mathura Refinery is producing BS VI standard fuels and supplying to Delhi NCR. A corporate MyStamp of the refinery has also been published by the Postal Department for recognizing the contributions of the refinery towards environment conscience.

== Environmental issues ==
It is located about 50 kilometers away from the Taj Mahal. It is currently asking the Indian government to allow an expansion, raising the capacity to 11 million tonnes. The refinery also wants to create a new garbage disposal site, which has garnered new outrage from environmental activists because the site will be located even closer to the Taj Mahal and Mathura. The Indian government hired a panel to examine the effects of the refinery on the Taj Mahal. The panel found that the air has high levels of suspended particulate matter, caused by factory emissions, dust, construction, and exhaust from automobiles. These are causing the Taj Mahal to change color.

== Accident ==
On 12 November 2024, a major fire and explosion broke out in the Atmospheric Vacuum Unit (AVU) of Mathura Refinery during start‑up following a 40‑day maintenance shutdown. It happened when an overheated furnace line ruptured and ignited hydrocarbons. Eight personnel sustained burn injuries, two with 50 percent burns, two with 40 percent, and four with 20 percent and three critical cases were air‑lifted to Apollo Hospital, Delhi, while the rest were treated locally. The fire was swiftly extinguished by on‑site teams, and refinery operations remained largely unaffected overall.

== See also ==
- Panipat Refinery
