= European Quality Award =

The European Quality Award is now referred to as the EFQM Excellence Award.

This distinction is awarded annually by the European Foundation for Quality Management to the organisation that is the best proponent in Europe of Total Quality Management.

The historical winners are:

- 1992 Rank Xerox
- 1993 Milliken Europe
- 1994 D2D (Design to Distribution)
- 1995 Texas Instruments
- 1996 Brisa (Bridgestone)
- 1997 SGS-Thomson
- 1998 TNT UK
- 1999 Yellow Pages
- 2000 Nokia
- 2001 St Mary's College Northern Ireland & Zahnarztpraxis
- 2002 SAM Mouldings
- 2003 Bosch Sanayi ve Ticaret AS & Runshaw College & Maxi Coco-Mat SA
- 2004 Kocaeli Chamber of Industry & YELL
- 2005 FirstPlus Financial Group & TNT Express
- 2006 BMW Chassis and Driveline Systems & Grundfos
- 2007 Lauaxeta Ikastola Sociedad Cooperativa & The Cedar Foundation & Villa Massa S.r.l. & Tobermore Concrete Products Ltd
- 2008 Bosch Sanayi ve Ticaret A.S. & Bursagaz & Council for the Curriculum, Examinations & Assessment
- 2009 Prize Winners Only
- 2010 Prize Winners Only
- 2011 Bilim Pharmaceuticals
- 2012 Robert Bosch GmbH Bamberg Plant
- 2013 Alpenresort Schwarz
- 2014 Bosch Bari Plant
- 2015 BMW AG Werk Regensburg
- 2016 Prize Winners Only
- Refer to the EFQM Excellence Award page for the full listing

In the past, the award was given to organisations in the following categories:

- Large Organisations and Business Units
- Operating Units of Companies
- Public Sector Organisations
- Small and Medium-sized Enterprises (SME) in two categories, 'Independent SMEs' and 'Subsidiaries of Larger Organisations'.

European Quality Prizes are awarded each year by the EFQM. Recipients are organisations that have applied for but not won the European Quality Award; however, the application was of such a high standard that the European Quality Prize is appropriate.

== See also ==
- EFQM
- Malcolm Baldrige National Quality Award for the USA
- Deming Prize for Japan
