= Deutsches Institut für Normung =

National standards organisation of Germany

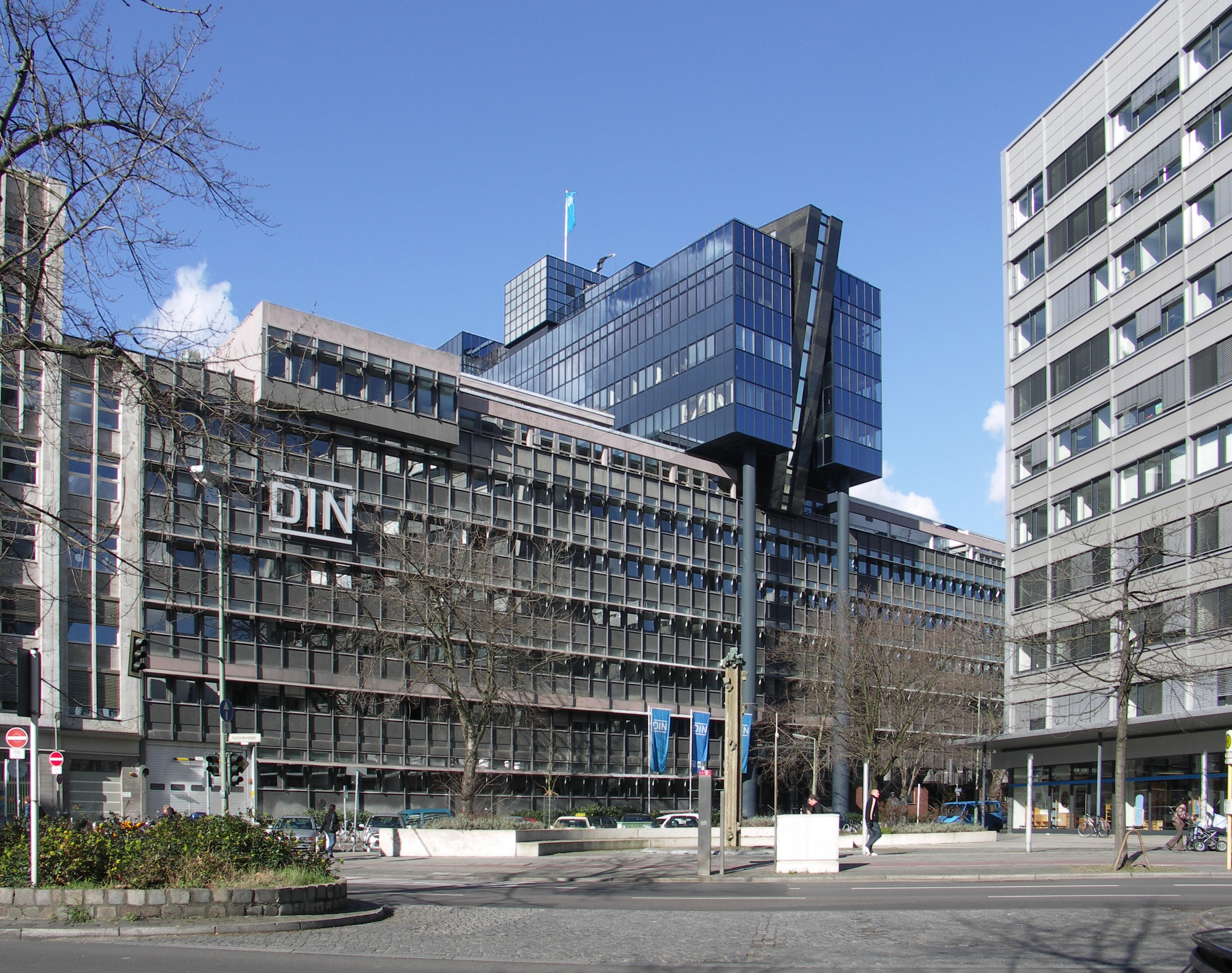
- Types: nonprofit organization
- Legal status: Registered association
- Headquarters: Berlin
- Country: Germany
- Membership: 4,193 (2026)
- Website: www.din.de/en

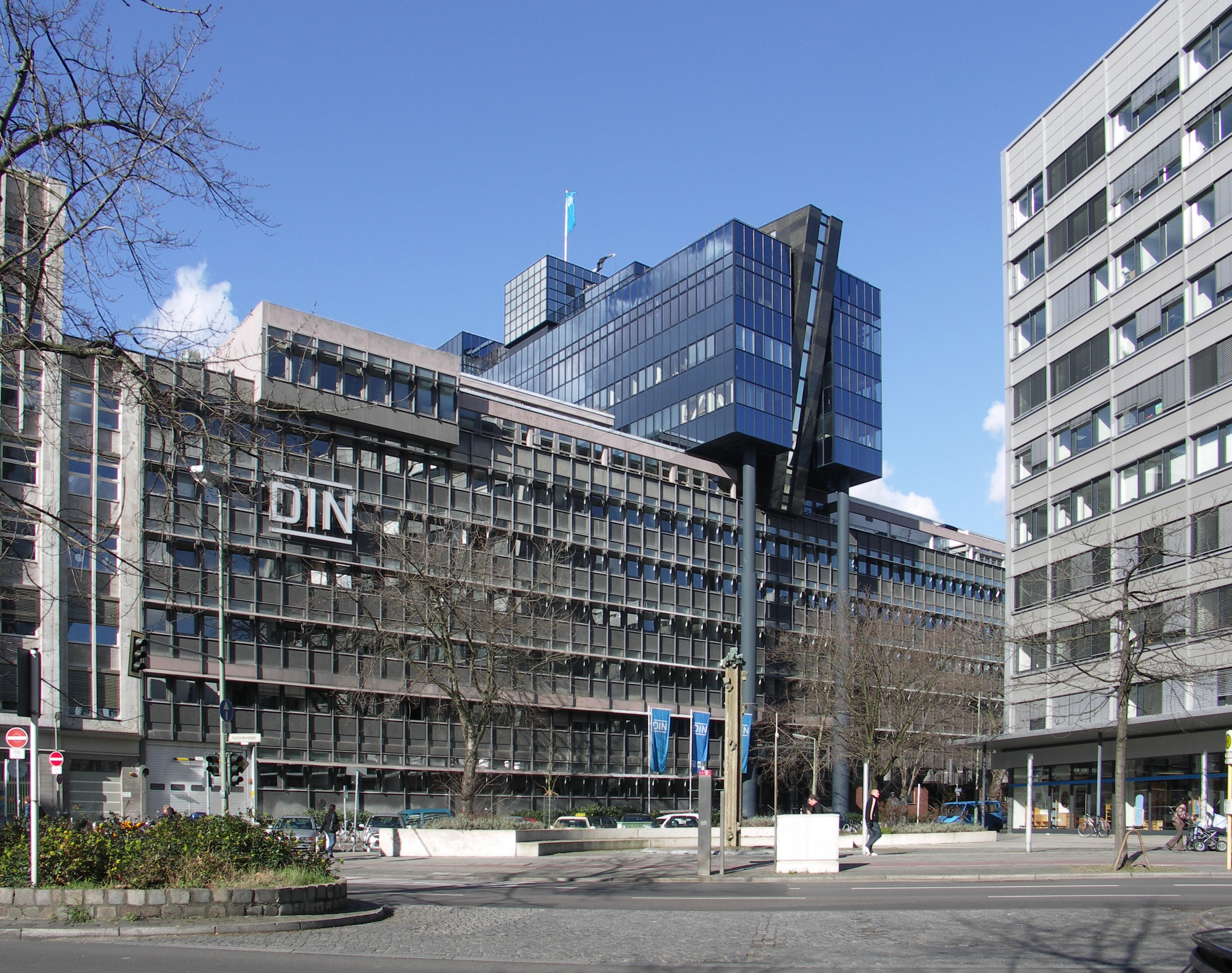
Head office of the German Institute for Standardization in Berlin-Tiergarten

Deutsches Institut für Normung e.V. (DIN; in English, the German Institute for Standardisation) is a German non-profit organization and acting as national organization for standardization. DIN is the German ISO member body. DIN is headquartered in Berlin. There are around thirty thousand DIN standards, covering nearly every field of technology.

== History ==
Founded in 1917 as the Normenausschuß der deutschen Industrie (NADI, "Standardisation Committee of German Industry"), the NADI was renamed Deutscher Normenausschuß (DNA, "German Standardisation Committee") in 1926 to reflect that the organization now dealt with standardization issues in many fields, not just for industrial products. In 1975, it was renamed again to Deutsches Institut für Normung, or 'DIN' and is recognised by the German government as the official national-standards body, representing German interests at the international and European levels.

The acronym, 'DIN' is often incorrectly expanded as Deutsche Industrienorm ("German Industry Standard"). This is largely due to the historic origin of the DIN as "NADI". The NADI indeed published their standards as DI-Norm (Deutsche Industrienorm). For example, the first published standard was 'DI-Norm 1' (about tapered pins) in 1918. Many people still mistakenly associate DIN with the old DI-Norm naming convention.

One of the earliest, and probably the best known, is DIN 476 — the standard that introduced the A-series paper sizes in 1922 — adopted in 1975 as International Standard ISO 216. Common examples in modern technology include DIN and mini-DIN connectors for electronics, and the DIN rail.

DIN SPEC 3105, published in 2020, is "the first German standard to be published under an open license (CC-BY-SA 4.0) [...] to implement an open standardisation process".

== DIN organisation ==
DIN is a nonprofit organization by German law. The nonprofit owns DIN Solutions GmbH, which produces the DIN contents and DIN Media (formerly Beuth Verlag), which sells the DIN-standard manuals. DIN is shareholder of DIN Bauportal GmbH and DQS Holding GmbH.

== DIN standard designation ==
The designation of a DIN standard shows its origin (# denotes a number):

- DIN # is used for German standards with primarily domestic significance or designed as a first step toward international status. E DIN # is a draft standard and DIN V # is a preliminary standard.
- DIN EN # is used for the German edition of European standards.
- DIN ISO # is used for the German edition of ISO standards.
- DIN EN ISO # is used if the standard has also been adopted as a European standard.,

Some of the DIN standards date back to the time of Nazi Germany. For example, standard DIN 5009, which describes the German Phonetic spelling code, is based on the postal spelling table, that was heavily edited by the Nazis. Until 1934 it specified "D" for David, "S" for Samuel, "Z" for Zacharias and "N" for Nathan. However, this went against the Nazis' ethnic-racial ideology and they decided to revise the letter board. The postal spelling table was partially revised in 1950 and formed the basis for the first version of the standard in 1983. The standard was revised again in 2022, using city names instead of person names.

== Examples of DIN standards ==
- DIN 476: international paper sizes (now ISO 216 or DIN EN ISO 216)
- DIN 1451: typeface used by German railways and on traffic signs
- DIN 31635: transliteration of the Arabic language
- DIN 41612: mechanical standard for backplane electrical connection
- DIN 72552: electric terminal numbers in automobiles

== Access to standards ==
DIN standards are not freely accessible to the public. DIN sells subscriptions with the descriptions of the DIN-standards via DIN Solutions GmbH and DIN Media.

For four EN standards, which are available as DIN-EN standards for a fee from DIN Media GmbH (formerly Beuth Verlag), the European Court of Justice (ECJ) decided on March 5, 2024, in the Malamud decision, that these must be made available free of charge because these standards are part of European Union law.

== Criticism ==
The majority of the standardization committees consist of representatives of the companies that are affected by the standards. DIN does not publish the names of committee members.

In 2023, the Federal Ministry for Housing, Urban Development and Building launched an initiative to question DIN standards because they are considered a cost driver. “A central goal is to speed up planning and construction and reduce construction costs in order to create more affordable housing. “The building standards are now being reviewed,” said a spokesman for Klara Geywitz's (SPD) ministry in 2023.

== See also ==
- Austrian Standards International – Standards organization and the ISO member body for Austria
- Swiss Association for Standardization
- Die Brücke – German advocacy institute, an earlier German institute aiming to set standard paper sizes
- DIN film speed – Measure of a photographic film's sensitivity to light
- DIN connector – Electrical connector
- Scuba DIN connection
- Scuba DIN connectors
- DQS - Deutsche Gesellschaft zur Zertifizierung von Managementsystemen – German holding company, a subsidiary of DIN
- DGQ - Deutsche Gesellschaft für Qualität – German quality management organization, founded in 1985 together with DIN
- List of DIN standards
