= Deutsche Gesellschaft für Qualität =

German quality management organization

Deutsche Gesellschaft für Qualität (DGQ)
- Type: A registered association
- Founded: 1952
- Headquarters: Frankfurt am Main, Germany
- Key people: Prof. Dr. Robert Schmitt (President); Dr. Norbert M. Gorny (Deputy President); Claudia Welker (Business Executive Director)
- Website: www.dgq.de

Deutsche Gesellschaft für Qualität eV ('German Association for Quality', DGQ) is a membership organization, which was founded in 1952 by Technical Statistics Committee under Committee for Economical Production. Since 1972, DGQ is legally independent under its present name.

The statutory purpose of the DGQ is to develop the expertise and methods in the field of quality management, to learn about the latest findings and promote their practical implementation. To this end, DGQ develops, communicates and promotes continuously in order to improve integrative management systems. With its 62 regional circles and four regional offices, DGQ provides a network of committed quality experts from companies and other organisations covering training sessions and seminars on quality, environmental and health & safety management.

The monthly journal Qualität und Zuverlässigkeit (in English; Quality and Reliability) is an important means of communication with its members.

DGQ e.V. is certified by DQS according to DIN EN ISO 9001: 2008 (Registration No. 3024-01).

== Structure ==
Founded in 1989, DQS Research serves annually about 15 national and international research projects - from idea to implementation. In collaboration with more than 20 research institutions in Germany, the association carries out projects under the industrial research on the Federation of Industrial Research Associations, AiF (in German: Arbeitsgemeinschaft industrieller Forschungsvereinigungen) with financial support of the Federal Ministry for Economic Affairs and Energy. FQS e.V. focus on new approaches to improve quality, support research in the field of quality assurance, quality management and in neighbouring topics. They initiate research and development activities and promote the transfer of results into operational practice - for example, with the FQS workshops.

The Personnel Certification division (in German: DGQ Personenzertifizierungsstelle) of DGQ is certified by the DAkkS according to DIN EN ISO 17024 / IEC (Registration No. D-ZP-19768-01-00). It meets internationally agreed requirements and issues certificates that certify the people skills.

Aa part of the restructuring in 2007, DGQ Weiterbildung GmbH was established as a training division for non-profit and charity purpose. Today, more than 12,000 professionals and managers adopt each year the diverse educational offer, which includes about 800 courses, seminars, compact training, exams, study programs and e-learning.

== External Presence ==
- Germany - DGQ and DIN (German Institute for Standardization) founded the first German certification body, DQS in 1985. The founding aim was mainly to promote the German economy. In 1986, DQS issued the first ISO9001 certificate in Germany and is currently one of the world's largest system certification bodies. In 1990, DQS became a charter and full member of IQNet. The main objective of this international certification network is building mutual recognition of certificates issued by the member companies among its approximately 40 member countries.

- Europe - DGQ is the only organisation in Germany that is entitled to issue European Organization for Quality (EOQ) certificates. In addition, as a Member and National Partner Organisation of the European Foundation for Quality Management (EFQM), DGQ promotes EFQM Excellence Award for strengthening companies and organisations on the global stage.

- International - On 26 October 2015, DGQ signed a Memorandum of Understanding with China Certification & Accreditation Association (CCAA). The aim of the memorandum is to add value to two organizations through mutual dialogue. The cooperation between DGQ and CCAA are especially the mutual exchange of information on developments in the certification of persons, in the training of quality professionals and standardization. Furthermore, both sides support the international development and coordination as well as mutual recognition of personal certificates through their memberships in the International Personnel Certification Association (IPC).
