= Canada Awards for Excellence =

National quality awards of Canada

- Awarded for: Recognizing Canadian businesses for excellence in applying the principles of Total Quality Management as embodied in Excellence Canada's Progressive Excellence Program
- Sponsored by: Excellence Canada
- Country: Canada
- First award: 1984 (Note: Quality was not awarded as a separate category until 1989)
- Website: www.excellence.ca/en/awards/

The Canada Awards for Excellence are the national quality awards of Canada. They are administered by Excellence Canada, a not-for-profit organization on behalf of the Governor General of Canada. Industry Canada established the awards in 1984 as the Canadian Business Excellence Awards. The National Quality Institute (NQI) was spun off as a separate, self-sustaining entity to administer the awards in 1992 and became Excellence Canada in 2011. While originally intended for profitmaking Canadian firms, the awards are now open to government agencies and not-for-profit organizations.

== Criteria and judging ==
As of 2014, there are eleven awards categories:

- Canada Order of Excellence (COE)
- Excellence, Innovation and Wellness (formerly Integrated Quality and Healthy Workplace)
- Quality (Private and Public Sectors)
- Healthy Workplace
- Mental Health at Work
- Healthy Workplace for Small Organizations
- Education (K to 12)
- Quality and Customer Service for Small Organizations
- Community Building
- Projects
- SeniorWise

As is typical for national quality awards, hopefuls complete a self-assessment which is reviewed by volunteer judges ("verifiers") and high-scoring candidates receive a follow-up site visit for closer judging. Based on the recommendations of the judges, a jury panel determines the awarding. Additionally, judges prepare detailed feedback which each applicant can use as the basis of self-improvement projects.

== See also ==
- Excellence Canada
- List of national quality awards
- Total Quality Management
