= Brain Bar =

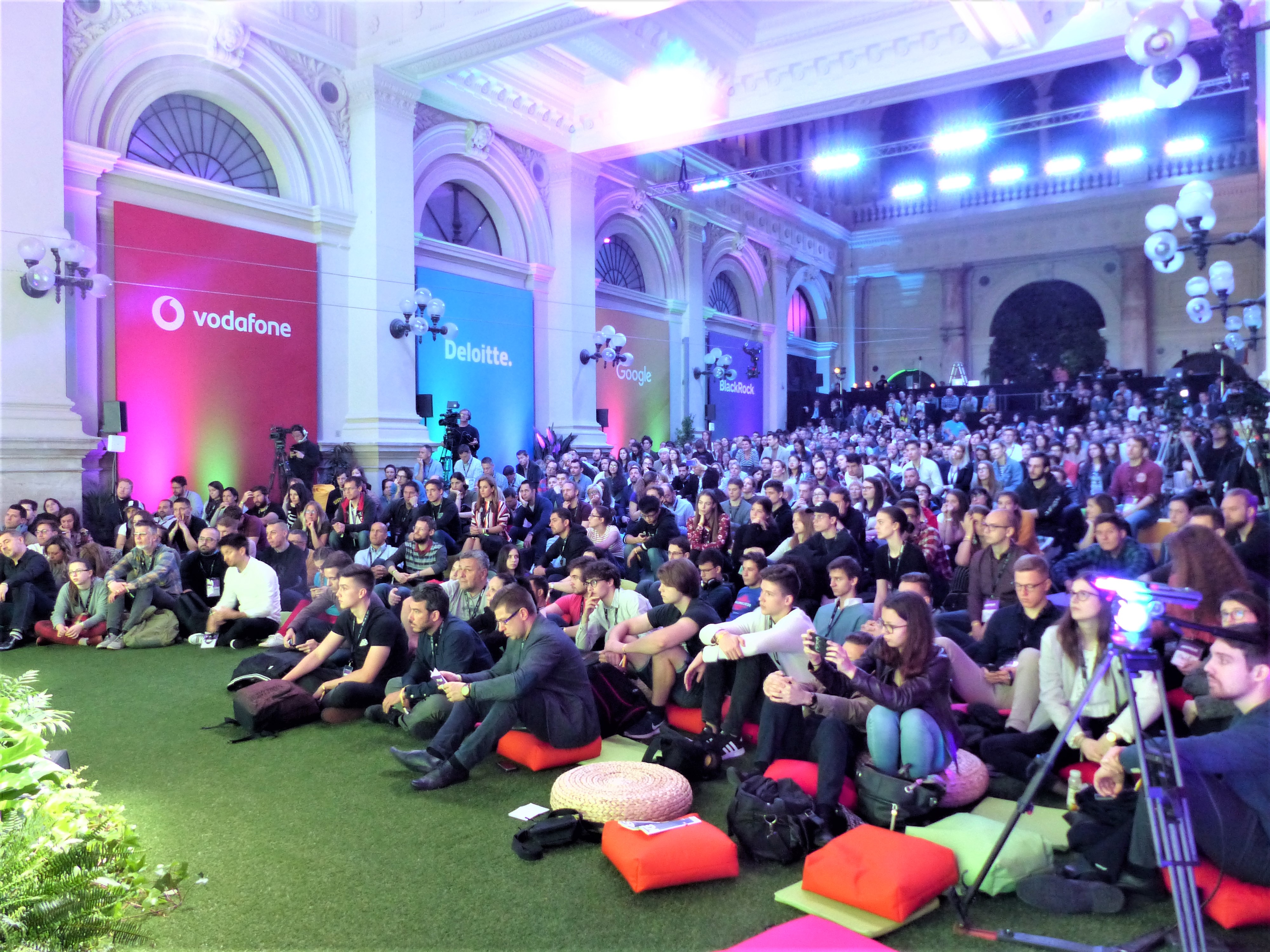
- Brain Bar 2019
- Genre: Festival
- Frequency: Annual
- Locations: Budapest, Hungary
- Founded: 2015
- Founder: Gergely Böszörményi-Nagy
- Next event: 2024
- Attendance: 15,000 (2019)
- Website: https://brainbar.com

Brain Bar is an annual event held in Budapest, Hungary. It has been referred to as "a sort of South by Southwest on the Danube" as it is both a tech conference and a music festival.

In addition to keynote presentations, it also features roundtable talks and debates that set up opposing viewpoints against each other, meant to encourage audience members' participation. The festival also has DJ sets, live music and dance as an integral part of the program.

== History ==
Brain Bar was founded in 2015 by Gergely Böszörményi-Nagy with the goal of creating a platform concerned mostly with future studies. The event grapples with future scenarios in the areas of technology, business, politics and lifestyle. Its talks are supposed to challenge commonly held beliefs.

In 2017 the platform "Future Jobs" was launched, which offers jobs from the fields of communication, design, IT, services and business and claims to be an "opportunity for young people to learn what employers are looking for, to inform educators about the requirements of tomorrow, and to help employers learn more about today’s talent." In 2018, Brain Bar launched its business-focused workshops, called "Mastermind Sessions".

In 2019 the event attracted 15,000 attendees, while the livestream audience was 50,000. A large number of tickets (5,000) were given away for free to European students and teachers.

== Speakers and partnerships ==
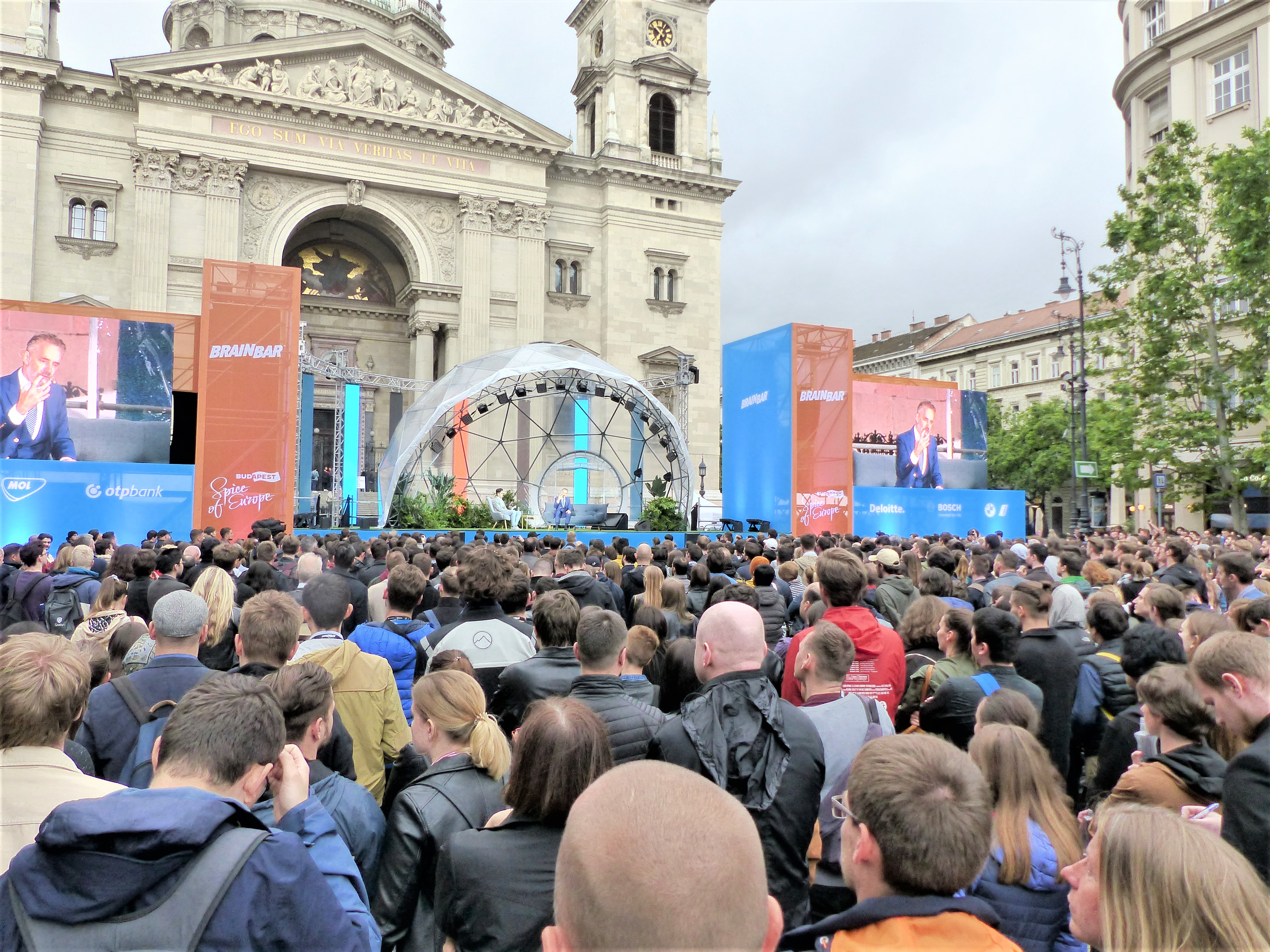
Jordan Peterson speaks in front of the St. Stephen's Basilica

Brain Bar has featured figures including Canadian psychologist Jordan B. Peterson, model and dietitian Maye Musk, PayPal co-founder Peter Thiel, restaurateur Massimo Bottura, EU Commissioner for Competition Margrethe Vestager, sci-fi author Ted Chiang, Google Vice President Jacquelline Fuller, former President of Estonia Toomas Hendrik Ilves, retired astronaut Chris Hadfield, paleontologist Jack Horner, criminal law professor Gabriel Hallevy, co-founder of Pirate Bay Peter Sunde and the robot Sophia.

Brain Bar formed partnerships with Deloitte, BMW, Vodafone, OTP, Bosch, MOL and WIRED as its media partner. Other sponsors include Google, E.ON and BlackRock.

In previous years the festival has included moderators from Forbes, the Financial Times and Politico Europe.
