= DQS =

German holding company

DQS Holding GmbH
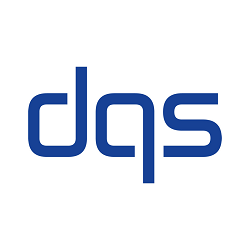
- Logo of DQS Holding
- Formerly: Deutsche Gesellschaft zur Zertifizierung von Managementsystemen
- Type: Certification and assessment company
- Industry: Assessment, Certification
- Founded: 1985
- Headquarters: Frankfurt am Main, Germany
- Area served: Global
- Key people: Ingo M. Ruebenach (CEO); Markus Ritzauer (CFO)
- Products: Assessment and Certification of Management Systems and Processes
- Revenue: €154.6 Mio. (2023)
- Number of employees: 968 (2023)
- Website: DQS Group

DQS Group, legally operating through DQS Holding GmbH, is a globally accredited certification and assessment organization headquartered in Frankfurt am Main, Germany. As an independent third party, DQS provides audits, certifications, and regulatory assessments of management systems, products, and processes across different industries.

DQS Group operates through 80 offices in approximately 60 countries. The group employed 968 staff members and collaborated with more than 3,100 qualified auditors in 2023.

== History ==
DQS was founded in 1985 as Deutsche Gesellschaft für Qualitätssicherung in Berlin and later renamed to Deutsche Gesellschaft zur Zertifizierung von Managementsystemen. It was the first German certification body for management systems. The aim of the founding partners, DGQ (German Society for Quality) and DIN (German Institute for Standardization), was mainly to promote the German economy. The foundation overlapped with the publication of the first drafts of the ISO 9000 series of standards, which also include the most important quality standard worldwide today: ISO 9001.

DQS began its work on 1 February 1985, five months before the first drafts of the ISO 9000 family of standards were published. It was the world’s third management system certification body and the first certification body in Germany to issue a certificate according to ISO 9001 in 1986.

During the following years, DQS began to expand its activities internationally. In 1990, DQS became a founding member of the international certification network EQNet (today IQNet), which brought together certification bodies from several countries. The establishment of the network was intended to take into account the increasing internationality of industry. In 1991, DQS became the first certification body in Germany to be accredited for ISO 9001/2/3 by TGA GmbH (now Deutsche Akkreditierungsstelle GmbH, DAkkS).

In 1994, the company established its first subsidiary abroad, DQS do Brasil in São Paulo.

In 2008, DQS merged with the management systems certification division of Underwriters Laboratories (UL). This expanded the company's activities in Europe, Asia, and North and South America, particularly in the United States. The merger with UL formed one of the world’s largest management system certification bodies with more than 60 offices in over 40 countries.

In the same year, the subsidiary DQS Medizinprodukte GmbH was established. It provides certification and assessment services for the medical device industry and related sectors. DQS had previously been involved in this field in 1995, when it established a competence centre for medical devices and was designated as a notified body under the European Medical Devices Directive (93/42/EEC).

In January 2009, DQS opened an office in Brentford, establishing DQS UK Ltd. The UK office was the twentieth DQS office in Europe. By 2010, DQS had more than 60 offices in over 50 countries and around 45,000 certified sites worldwide.

In 2014, DQS established a Global Account Management unit to coordinate its international customer business. In 2017, DQS introduced the certification scheme Qualified Carrier, developed with representatives of the logistics sector and aimed primarily at small and medium-sized transport companies.

In January 2023, DQS entered into a strategic partnership with the VDE Testing and Certification Institute. The cooperation offers joint certification services for management systems, including cross-border certification activities.

In February 2026, DQS integrated its Malaysia and Singapore operations into the group as wholly owned subsidiaries. Prior to this integration, the operations in both markets had been conducted under a licence partner model.

== Corporate Organization ==
DQS Holding GmbH, based in Frankfurt am Main, is the holding company of the international DQS Group. DQS has 80 offices in approximately 60 countries. The main shareholders of DQS are DIN (Deutsches Institut für Normung), DGQ (Deutsche Gesellschaft für Qualität) and UL Solutions. DQS employed 968 people and collaborated with more than 3100 auditors in 2023 and generated a revenue of €154.6 million.

Subsidiaries and licence partners include, among others:

- DQS GmbH – Management Systems Certification
- DQS Medizinprodukte GmbH – Medical Device Certification (Notified Body 0297)
- DQS CFS GmbH – Sustainability, Corporate Responsibility & Supply Chain Assessments
- DQS Inc. (USA)
- DQS Japan Inc.
- DQS do Brasil Ltda
- DQS MSS Argentina s.r.l.
- DQS AP Ltd. (China)
- DQS France SAS
- DQS Management Systems Solutions (HK) Limited
- Deutsch Quality Systems Private Limited (India)
- DQS Korea LLC
- DQS de México S.A. de C.V.
- DQS Polska sp. z o.o.
- DQS German Association for Certification of Management Systems (Pty) Ltd. (South Africa)
- DQS Taiwan Inc.
- DQS Denetim ve Belgelendirme Limited Şirketi
- DQS UK Ltd.

== Services ==
=== Certifications of management systems ===
The group’s services include assessments to customer or industry-specific requirements and certifications to national and international standards and specifications. In addition, the group offers assessments in the areas of quality management, environmental management, information security, energy management, and sector-specific standards including automotive and sustainability-related assessments.

DQS offers certifications and assessments, including:

- Quality and management systems: ISO 9001, ISO 14001, ISO 45001
- Sector-specific standards: IATF 16949 (automotive quality management), EN 9100 (aerospace), ISO/TS 22163 (railway)
- Information and data security: ISO 27001, TISAX (information security in the automotive industry), ENX VCS (vehicle cybersecurity audit scheme)
- Sustainability and environment: ISO 14001, ISO 50001, ISO 14064, FSSC 22000, GRI, ESG audits, SEDEX SMETA (ethical supply chain audits)
- Compliance and risk management: ISO 37001 (anti-bribery), ISO 22301 (business continuity), ISO 26000 (social responsibility)
- Healthcare and medical: ISO 13485, MDSAP, MDR conformity assessments, ISO 15378, TCP III, PMD Act.
- AI and emerging technologies: ISO 42001
- Food, feed, and consumer: FSSC 22000, ISO 22000, IFS Food, BRCGS Consumer Products Certification, BRCGS Food Certification

=== Notified body ===
DQS Medizinprodukte GmbH functions as a Notified body under the Medical Device Regulation (EU) 2017/745, also known as EU MDR or CE Marking for medical devices. It provides conformity assessments and certifications for medical device manufacturers, covering standards such as:

- ISO 13485 – Quality management systems for medical devices
- MDSAP – Medical device single audit program
- Medical Device Regulation (EU) 2017/745 – CE Marking for medical devices

=== Network ===
DQS participates in national and international committees, associations, and standardization organizations. DQS takes part in technical committees for example, DIN (Deutsches Institut für Normung), responsible for developing and revising ISO and EN standards related to quality, environmental management, occupational health and safety, and sustainability.

DQS is a charter and full member of the international certification network IQNet Association which was founded in 1990. The main objective of the currently approximately 40-member global network is the mutual recognition of certificates issued by the member companies.
