= EFQM Excellence Award =

Award recognizing European businesses

EFQM Global Award
- Awarded for: It recognises industry leaders improving their organisation's performance.
- Sponsored by: EFQM
- Location: Brussels, Belgium
- Country: Europe
- First award: 1992
- Website: http://www.efqm.org/what-we-do/recognition/efqm-excellence-award

The EFQM Excellence Award now known as The EFQM Global Award is a quality award that recognises European businesses with "excellent and sustainable results" across all areas of The EFQM Model. It was established in October 1991 as the European Quality Award by the European Foundation for Quality Management (EFQM). The assessment process is one of the most robust of any award, with a team of independent assessors spending an average of 500 hours per applicant reviewing documentation and conducting interviews on-site.

Following this, an Assessors Feedback Report is created, showing how well the organisation is currently doing and how they can improve at a strategic level. The report is then presented to an independent Jury that decides the level of recognition for each applicant organisation. Throughout the process, the interaction with the assessment team enables an organisation to gain expert insights to tackle its future challenges.

== Award Categories ==
The Award is open to organisations from both the Private and Public Sectors. Applicants will either be recognized as "Finalists", "Prize Winners" or "Award Winners". An "Award Winner" is an organisation that is able to demonstrate that they are considered a role model for the Fundamental Concepts of Excellence, as defined in the EFQM Excellence Model. There are 4 categories:

1. Large Private Sector (over 1000 employees)

2. Small / Medium Private Sector (less than 1000 employees)

3. Large Public Sector (over 1000 employees)

4. Small / Medium Public Sector (less than 1000 employees)

An independent jury of experts review the applications and the reports from the assessments. Each year, they can decide to give multiple awards, in line with the Award Categories. The last time there were multiple winners was 2008, when BMW won in the Large Private Sector category and St. Mary's College won in the Small / Medium Public Sector category. However, if no organisation can adequately demonstrate they are a role model, they can decide there is no Award Winner that year. This last happened in 2010.

== See also ==
- List of national quality awards
- Total Quality Management
