= Union of Japanese Scientists and Engineers =

JUSE (Union of Japanese Scientists and Engineers)
- 日本科学技術連盟
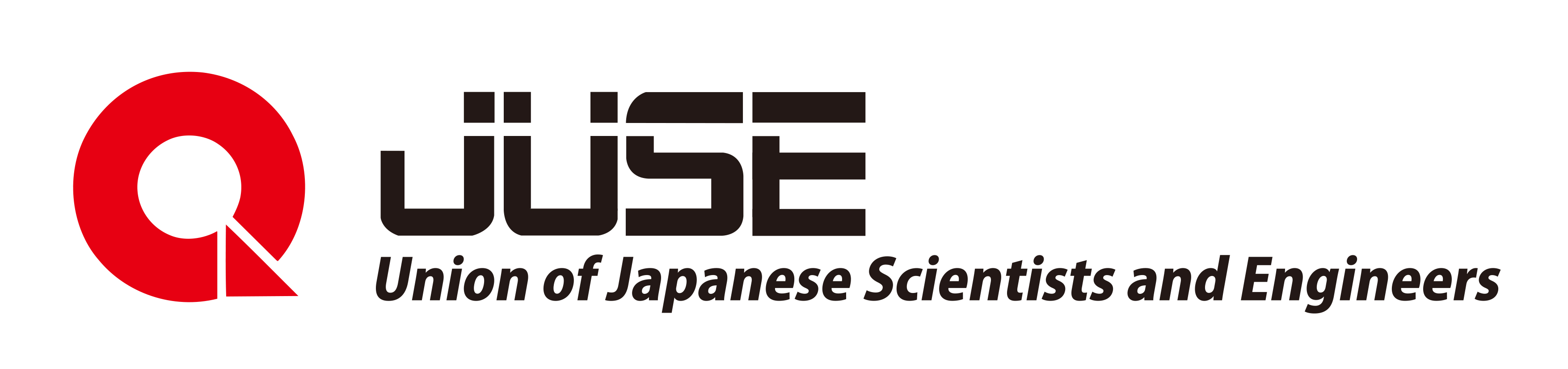

Non-ministerial government department overview
- Formed: 1946
- Headquarters: Odakyu Daiichi Seimei Building 4F, 2-7-1 Nishi-Shinjuku, Shinjuku-ku, Tokyo 163-0704; 35.6918°N 139.6910°E
- Minister responsible: Hirokazu Matsuno
- Parent Non-ministerial government department: Ministry of Education, Culture, Sports, Science and Technology
- Website: www.juse.or.jp/english

The Union of Japanese Scientists and Engineers (JUSE) (Japanese: 日本科学技術連盟), was established in May 1946 by the Science and Technology Agency (now known as the Ministry of Education, Culture, Sports, Science and Technology) of the Government of Japan "To cope with the rapid advancement of society". Kenichi Koyanagi and Ichiro Ishikawa were founders of the JUSE.

== History ==
After the Second World War and the Occupation of Japan, the Government of Japan promoted the creation of industrial organisations. One of these organisations was the Union of Japanese Scientists and Engineers (JUSE). JUSE brought leaders and experts from all of Japan’s major industries together to share the best practices. It was directed to "revitalise Japan’s economy and [eliminate] waste by improving quality". It was established in May 1946 by the Science and Technology Agency (now known as the Ministry of Education, Culture, Sports, Science and Technology) of the Government of Japan.

Under the patronage of the Supreme Commander for the Allied Powers, the JUSE invited W. Edwards Deming, an American engineer and statistician to lecture them on the use of statistical quality control. He arrived in June 1950 and he returned again on five occasions as consultant to Japanese industry. The following year the JUSE established the Deming Prize, which was originally awarded to individuals who had contributed to the theory and application of quality control and to corporations which had obtained outstanding results in the application of quality control.

Joseph M. Juran was also invited to give lectures to the JUSE in 1954 and 1960. His lectures centered on managing quality and in making quality a business strategy.

== Current organisation ==
The objective of the JUSE is to

Promote systematic studies needed for the advancement of science and technology, whereupon to contribute to the development of culture and industry.

The organisation is run by a board of 10 directors. Membership of JUSE is restricted to corporations only. Many of its corporate members are in manufacturing, construction and service industries.
