= Gabriel Hallevy =

Israeli professor of criminal law

- גבריאל הלוי
- Born: 1973 (age 52–53)
- Education: LL.B., Tel-Aviv University; LL.M., Tel-Aviv University; Ph.D., University of Haifa
- Occupation: Professor of Criminal Law
- Employer: Ono Academic College
- Known for: Research on criminal law and artificial intelligence
- Notable work: Articles and books on AI and criminal law
- Awards: Special honorary prize by the Knesset, "Top 40 Under 40" by Globes

Gabriel Hallevy (Hebrew: גבריאל הלוי; born 1973) is an Israeli professor of criminal law. He teaches at the Faculty of Law of Ono Academic College.

== Biography ==
Gabriel Hallevy earned his LL.B. magna cum laude from Tel-Aviv University, and was on the Dean's List. He earned his LL.M. magna cum laude from Tel-Aviv University, and his Ph.D. summa cum laude from the University of Haifa.

== Law and academic career ==
After obtaining his Ph.D. degree, Hallevy was promoted to Senior Lecturer (2008), to associate professor (2011) and to full professor (2013), becoming Israel's youngest law professor. That year he was chosen as one of the 40 most promising Israelis under the age of 40 ("Top 40 Under 40") by the Israeli leading economic magazine in Israel, "Globes". The Knesset, the Israeli Parliament, granted him a special honorary prize for the research in criminal law.

Hallevy's articles and books on artificial intelligence and criminal law have been translated into several languages, including Turkish, Korean and Chinese. In this issue he lectures not only to academic audience, but to general audience as well, including TED lecture and in Brain Bar festivals.

Hallevy lectures on criminal law, criminal justice, evidence law, conflict of laws, bankruptcy law, corporate law, hi-tech law and game theory, he is a long-distance runner, member of the Israeli Bar, holds a pilot license and speaks Hebrew, English, French and German. He is frequently cited in the Israeli Supreme Court, which has embraced most of his original ideas in criminal law.

== Published works ==
=== Books ===
- Securities' Offences (Heb., 405 pp., 2002)
- Complicity in Criminal Law' (Heb., 824 pp., 2008)
- Theory of Criminal Law vol. I (Heb., 960 pp., 2009)
- Theory of Criminal Law vol. II (Heb., 1,047 pp., 2009)
- Theory of Criminal Law vol. III (Heb., 1016 pp., 2010)
- Theory of Criminal Law vol. IV (Heb., 986 pp., 2010)
- A Modern Treatise on the Principle of Legality in Criminal Law (Eng., 250 pp., 2010)
- Theory of Criminal Justice vol. I (Heb., 713 pp., 2011)
- Theory of Criminal Justice vol. II (Heb., 919 pp., 2011)
- Theory of Criminal Justice vol. III (Heb., 700 pp., 2011)
- Theory of Criminal Justice vol. IV (Heb., 886 pp., 2011)
- The Matrix of Derivative Criminal Liability (Eng., 326 pp., 2012)
- The Right to Be Punished – Modern Doctrinal Sentencing (Eng., 252 pp., 2013)
- When Robots Kill – Artificial Intelligence under Criminal Law (Eng., 260 pp., 2013)
- Theory of the Law of Evidence vol. I (Heb., 800 pp., 2013)
- Theory of the Law of Evidence vol. II (Heb., 867 pp., 2013)
- Theory of the Law of Evidence vol. III (Heb., 1,024 pp., 2013)
- Theory of the Law of Evidence vol. IV (Heb., 954 pp., 2013)
- Theory of the Conflict of Laws vol. I (Heb., 956 pp., 2014)
- Theory of the Conflict of Laws vol. II (Heb., 987 pp., 2014)
- Theory of the Conflict of Laws vol. III (Heb., 978 pp., 2014)
- Theory of the Conflict of Laws vol. IV (Heb., 818 pp., 2015)
- Liability for Crimes Involving Artificial Intelligence Systems (Eng., 265 pp., 2015)
- The Matrix of Insanity in Modern Criminal Law (Eng., 214 pp., 2015)
- Enforcement of Obligations Law vol. I (Heb., 1,026 pp., 2017)
- Enforcement of Obligations Law vol. II (Heb., 1,070 pp., 2017)
- Theory of Civil Procedure vol. I (Heb., 1,058 pp., 2017)
- Theory of Civil Procedure vol. II (Heb., 1,074 pp., 2017)
- Theory of Civil Procedure vol. III (Heb., 984 pp., 2019)
- Cyber Law (Eng., 304 pp., 2019)
- 加布里埃尔·哈列维, 犯罪机器人 – 人工智能 与 刑法 (Chinese, 304 pp., 2019)
- Theory of Civil Procedure (Special Edition Adapted to the Civil Procedure Regulations, 2018) vol. I (Heb., 1,034 pp., 2019)
- Theory of Civil Procedure (Special Edition Adapted to the Civil Procedure Regulations, 2018) vol. II (Heb., 1,040 pp., 2019)
- Theory of Civil Procedure (Special Edition Adapted to the Civil Procedure Regulations, 2018) vol. III (Heb., 984 pp., 2019)
- Theory of Civil Procedure (Special Edition Adapted to the Civil Procedure Regulations, 2018) vol. IV (Heb., 988 pp., 2019)
- Insolvency and Economic Rehabilitation Law vol. I (Heb., 1078 pp., 2020)
- Insolvency and Economic Rehabilitation Law vol. II (Heb., 1061 pp., 2020)
- Cyber Law (2nd ed., Eng., 306 pp., 2021)

=== Articles ===
- "Therapeutic Victim-Offender Mediation within the Criminal Justice Process – Sharpening the Evaluation of Personal Potential for Rehabilitation while Righting Wrongs under the Alternative-Dispute-Resolution (ADR) Philosophy", 16 Harvard Negotiation Law Review. 65 (2011)
- "Culture-based Crimes against Women in Societies Absorbing Immigrants – Rejecting the "Mistake of Law" Defense and Imposing Harsher Sentencing", 16 Cardozo Journal of Law & Gender 439 (2010)
- "The Criminal Liability of Artificial Intelligence Entities – from Science Fiction to Legal Social Control", 4 Akron Intellectual Property Journal 171 (2010)
- "'I, Robot – I, Criminal' – When Science Fiction Becomes Reality – Legal Liability of AI Robots Committing Criminal Offenses", 2010 Syracuse Science & Technology Law Reporter 1 (2010)
- "Virtual Criminal Responsibility", 6 Original Law Review 121 (2011)
- "Unmanned Vehicles – Subordination to Criminal Law under the Modern Concept of Criminal Liability", 21 Journal of Law, Information and Science 311 (2012)
- "Ignoring the Law in the Name of Honor", GNLU Law Review (2010)
- "The Impact of Defense Arguments Based on the Cultural Difference of the Accused in the Criminal Law of Immigrant Countries and Societies", Journal of Migration & Refugee Issues (2009)
- "Victim's Complicity in Criminal Law", 22 International Journal of Punishment and Sentencing 76 (2006)
- "The Defense Attorney as Mediator in Plea Bargains", 9 Pepperdine Dispute Resolution Law Journal 495 (2009)
- "Rethinking the Legitimacy of Anglo-American High Courts' Judicial Review of Determining Factual Findings in Courts of the First Instance in Criminal Cases", 51 The High Court Quarterly Review 20 (2009)
- "The Recidivist Wants to Be Punished – Punishment as an Incentive to Reoffend", 5 International Journal of Punishment and Sentencing 120 (2010)
- "Is ADR (Alternative Dispute Resolution) Philosophy Relevant to Criminal Justice? – Plea Bargains as Mediation Process between the Accused and the Prosecution", Original Law Review (2009)
- "The Privatization of the Criminal Prosecution – The Private Criminal Complaint as an Equilibrium between 'Privatization' and 'Publicization' under a Discourse of Economic Efficiency", Military Law Review (Heb., 2008)
- "The Time Factor and Contemporaneity in Criminal Law", OAC Law Review (Heb., 2006)
- "Developments Trends in Criminal Justice and Evidence Law in Israel", OAC Law Review (Heb., 2004)
- "The External Element (Actus Reus) of the Sexual Offences – A Critical Analysis", IDF Law Review (Heb., 2003)
- "The Renaissance of the Re-Trial in Israel", TAKDIM (Heb., 2004)
- "Possession in Criminal Law", OAC Law Review (Heb., 2008)
- "The Criminal Liability of Caregivers and their Institutes for the Death of the Dying Patient", Journal of Health Law & Bioethics (Heb., 2008)
- "The Extra-Territorial Applicability of the Criminal Law of the Occupying State in Occupied Territories", Military Law Review (Heb., 2008)
- "The Principle of Legality and Constitutionality in Criminal Law", OAC Law Review (Heb., 2009)
- "The Private Prosecution in the Criminal Justice", OAC Law Review (Heb., 2011)
- "The Influence of the Recidivism Factor on the Quantitative Assessment of Punishment", Book in Honor of Professor Shlomo Giora Shoham, Tel-Aviv University (Heb., 2010)
- "Incapacitating Terrorism through Legal Fight – The Need to Redefine Inchoate Offenses under the Liberal Concept of Criminal Law", Alabama CL-CR L. Rev., Vol. 3, pp. 87–119 (2012)
- "National Security under Liberal Substantive Criminal Law – When Do National Security Issues Become Criminal?", Creighton Int'l & Comp. L.J., Vol. 3, pp. 1–30 (2013)
- "Legal Equalization of the Mentally Retarded Person to the Infant – Applicability of the General Defense of Infancy upon Mentally Retarded Persons", Journal of Health Law & Bioethics, Vol. 5 pp. 13–54 (Heb., 2013)
- "The Structure of the Criminal Offense – Towards Recodification of the Law of Offenses (Special Part of the Israeli Penal Code) in Israel", OAC L. Rev., Vol. 10, pp. 43–77 (Heb., 2014)
- "The Competence to Testify of Mentally Disordered and Mentally Retarded Persons," Alei Mishpat L. Rev. Vol. 12, pp. 29–66 (Heb., 2016)
- "Algebraic Insights towards the Legal Transformation of Fault within in personam Defenses under Modern Criminal Law", Athens Journal of Law, Vol. 2.1 pp. 19–32 (2016)
- "Culture Offenses instead of Cultural Defense – Criminalization of Oppression against Women in the Name of Honor", Cultural Essentialism in Intercultural Relations, Palgrave Macmillan Academic Press (2015)
- "The Shadows of Normality: Legal Insanity under Modern Criminal Law", The Insanity Defense: Multidisciplinary Views on Its History, Trends and Controversies pp. 97–132, Praeger (2017)
- "Criminal Liability for Intellectual Property Offenses of Artificial Intelligence Entities in Virtual and Augmented Reality Environments", RESEARCH HANDBOOK ON THE LAW OF VIRTUAL AND AUGMENTED REALITY, pp. 389–419, Edward Elgar Pub. (2018)
- "Dangerous Robots – Artificial Intelligence vs. Human Intelligence", DANGEROUS IDEAS, South Korea (Korean, 2018)
- "Criminal Law" THE ISRAELI LEGAL SYSTEM – AN INTRODUCTION, pp. 205–229, Hart Pub. (2019)
