= Gergely Böszörményi Nagy =

Hungarian engrepreneur (born 1984)

Gergely Böszörményi-Nagy
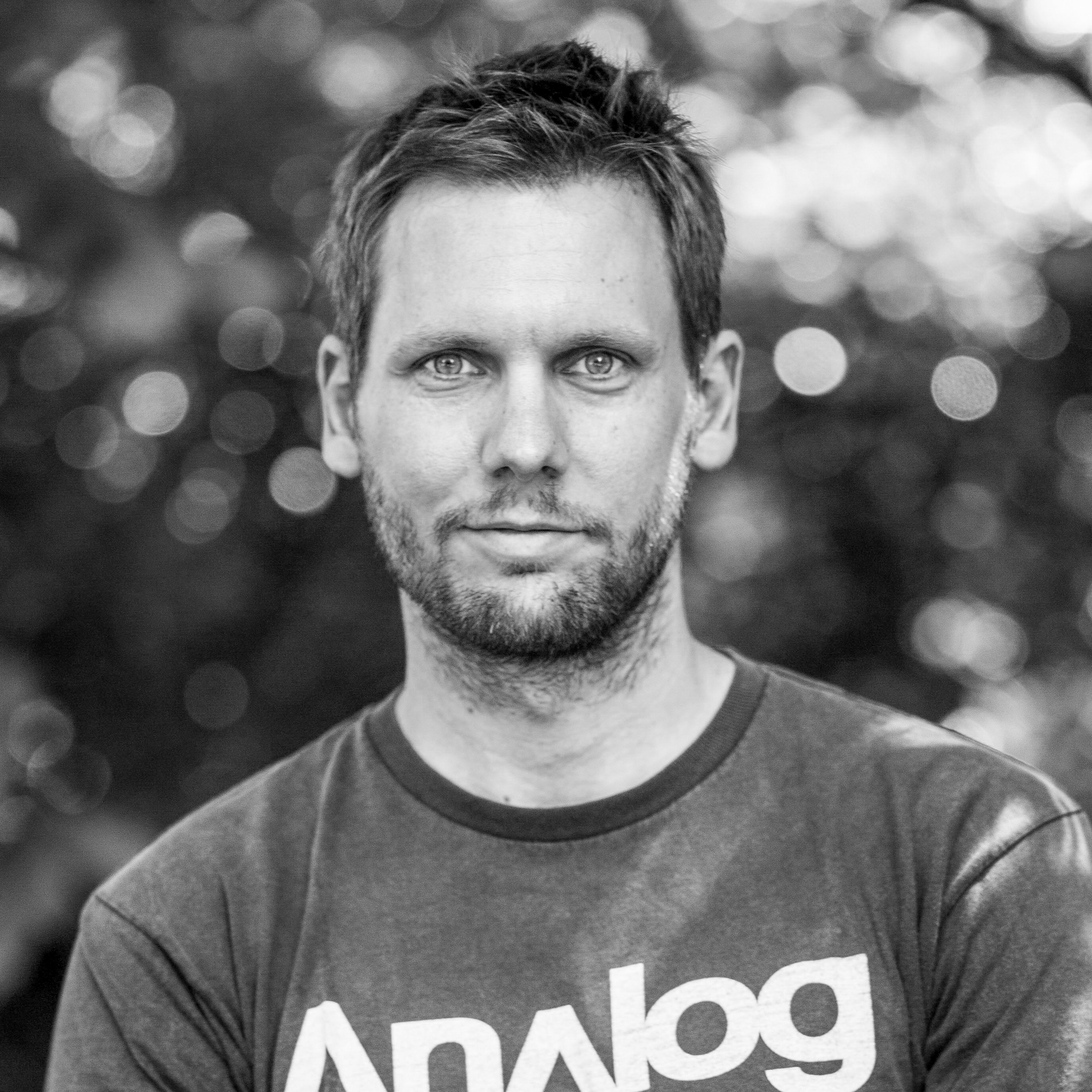
- Böszörményi Nagy in 2019
- Born: Gergely Böszörményi-Nagy; August 1, 1984 (age 42); Budapest, Hungary
- Education: Corvinus University of Budapest London School of Economics Central European University Stanford Graduate School of Business
- Occupation: Entrepreneur
- Known for: Founder of Brain Bar

Gergely Böszörményi-Nagy (born August 1, 1984) is an entrepreneur and former public servant who founded Brain Bar and the current chairman of the board of Moholy-Nagy University of Art and Design.

His other projects include Design Terminal, a social enterprise based in Budapest, Hungary that helps startups to reach the global marketplace and Datapolis, an urban intelligence company co-founded by Böszörményi-Nagy and world-renowned network scientist Albert-László Barabási.

== Education ==
Böszörményi-Nagy earned his Master of Science degrees in International relations from Corvinus University of Budapest and in urbanism from the London School of Economics. He pursued a Master of Business Administration at Central European University and studied Social Entrepreneurship at Stanford Graduate School of Business.

== Career ==
=== 2010s ===
From 2010 to 2012, Böszörményi-Nagy was head of EU communication for the Government of Hungary, leading the public outreach of Hungary's first Presidency of the Council of the European Union.

In 2012 Böszörményi-Nagy joined Design Terminal, the government agency responsible for design and innovation. During his leadership, the company launched an extensive portfolio of incubation services for innovative enterprises, for which Design Terminal was awarded the European Enterprise Promotion Awards by the European Commission. In 2015, UNESCO selected Budapest for its global Creative Cities network, mostly in recognition of the services and projects of Design Terminal. Following an extensive restructuring in the Hungarian public administration, Design Terminal made a transition to the private sector as a social enterprise, and expanded its operations to a regional scale with programs across Central-Europe while relying on public grants and business revenues.

=== 2020s ===
In 2020 Böszörményi-Nagy was appointed as chairman of the board of Moholy-Nagy University of Art and Design (MOME), Hungary's major educational institution for the creative industries. His nomination came as part of the Hungarian state's controversial initiative to transfer the control of certain public universities to so-called public interest foundations (trust funds). The trust fund boards have significant power over decision making and are often made up of people affiliated with the governing party, Fidesz. Fearing the state of academic freedom, especially after the illegal removing of the Central European University from Hungary, the process of privatizing state founded universities have met heavy criticism in the whole country. In January 2025, students at MOME started a series of protests due to what they perceive as Böszörményi-Nagy exerting direct influence and bypassing the university's decision making mechanisms.

== Politics ==
In 2008, Böszörményi-Nagy became the Vice President of the Budapest section of Fidelitas, the youth organization of the conservative Fidesz party. Following Fidesz's win of the 2010 elections, Böszörményi-Nagy worked at the Hungarian Ministry of Public Administration and Justice. His firm CreaCity provides advisory services for minister Gergely Gulyás. In 2011 he wrote an article on Mandiner under a pseudonym where he attacked an opposition activist in a tone which caused controversy.

== Brain Bar ==
In June 2015 Böszörményi-Nagy founded Brain Bar, a global festival focused on the future. The annual event revolves around a two-day concentration of interactive talks and debates on business, social, cultural, technological and political trends, and attracts thousands of visitors per year with past speakers including PayPal co-founder Peter Thiel, bestselling author Malcolm Gladwell, Canadian psychologist Jordan B. Peterson, historian Niall Ferguson, three Michelin star restaurateur Massimo Bottura, WPP plc founder Sir Martin Sorrell, EU Commissioner for Competition Margrethe Vestager, best-selling futurist Kevin Kelly, economists Mariana Mazzucato and Tim Harford, Pirate Bay founder Peter Sunde, technology critic Evgeny Morozov, geopolitical analysts George Friedman and Bruno Maçães, controversial environmentalist Bjørn Lomborg, sociologist Philip Zimbardo, astronaut and former International Space Station commander Chris Hadfield, architect Sou Fujimoto, Sea Shepherd captain Peter Hammarstedt, supermodel Maye Musk and the world's first humanoid robot citizen, Sophia. As part of its social impact policy, Brain Bar is free to attend for a group of outstanding teachers and students based on pre-selection. Brain Bar operates as a private enterprise co-owned by Böszörményi-Nagy and a group of business angels.

== Awards ==
Böszörményi-Nagy has been awarded with the Golden Cross of the Hungarian Order of Merit in 2020. Earlier Google, the Financial Times and the International Visegrad Fund named him among 'New Europe 100', the list of Central Europe's key figures in the new economy.
