= Deming Prize =

- Awarded for: Recognizing businesses worldwide for excellence in applying the principles of Total Quality Management
- Sponsored by: Japanese Union of Scientists and Engineers (JUSE)
- Country: Japan
- First award: 1951
- Website: www.juse.or.jp/deming_en/

The Deming Prize is the longest-running national quality award and one of the highest awards in the world. It recognizes both individuals for their contributions to the field of quality and businesses that have successfully implemented exemplary systems that promote quality of goods and services. It was established in 1951 to honor W. Edwards Deming who contributed greatly to Japan’s proliferation of statistical quality control after World War II. His teachings helped Japan build its foundation by which the level of Japan’s product quality has been recognized as the highest in the world, was originally designed to reward Japanese companies for major advances in quality improvement. Over the years it has grown, under the guidance of the Japanese Union of Scientists and Engineers (JUSE) to where it is now also available to non-Japanese companies, albeit usually operating in Japan, and also to individuals recognized as having made major contributions to the advancement of quality. The awards ceremony is broadcast every year in Japan on national television.

Two categories of awards are made annually, the Deming Prize for Individuals and the Deming Prize, with a third, the Deming Distinguished Practice Award to be awarded for the first time in October 2024.

== Winners of individual award ==
- 1951: Motosaburo Masuyama
- 1952: Tetsuichi Asaka, Kaoru Ishikawa, Masao Kogure, Masao Goto, Hidehiko Higashi, Shin Miura, Shigeru Mizuno, Eizo Watanabe
- 1953: Toshio Kitagawa
- 1954: Eizaburo Nishibori
- 1988: Renichi Takenaka
- 1989: Hitoshi Kume
- 1990: Shoichiro Kobayashi
- 1991: Kenji Kurogane
- 1992: Masao Nemoto
- 1993: Yasutoshi Washio
- 1994: Takanori Yoneyama
- 1995: Ayatomo Kanno
- 1996: Kenzo Sasaoka
- 1997: Noriaki Kano
- 1998: Katsuya Hosotani
- 1999: Yotaro Kobayashi
- 2000: Matabee Maeda
- 2001: Shiro Fujita
- 2002: Shoji Shiba
- 2003: Tadashi Yoshizawa
- 2004: Akira Takahashi
- 2005: Hajime Sasaki
- 2006: Yoshinori Iizuka
- 2007: Masayoshi Ushikubo
- 2008: Masahiro Sakane
- 2009: Hiroshi Osada
- 2010: Takao Enkawa
- 2011: Masamitsu Sakurai
- 2012: Makoto Nakao
- 2013: Hideo Iwasaki
- 2014: Kazuyuki Suzuki
- 2015: Tadaaki Jagawa
- 2016: Naotake Okubo
- 2017: Takeshi Nakajo
- 2018: Kunihiko Onuma
- 2019: Yasushi Nagata
- 2020: Shinichi Sasaki
- 2021: Hiroe Tsubaki

== Winners of application prize ==
1951

- Fuji Iron & Steel, (now part of Nippon Steel)
- Showa Denko
- Tanabe Seiyaku
- Yawata Iron & Steel, (now part of Nippon Steel)

1958

- Kaneka Corporation

1961

- Denso Japan

1965

- Toyota

1976

- Pentel "(a first for the stationery industry)".

1979

- Takenaka Corporation "(a first for non-manufacturer industry)".

1981

- JUKI Corporation (Tokyo Juki Industrial Co., Ltd., Industrial Sewing Machine Division)

1989

- Florida Power & Light (first non-Japanese winner of award)

1991

- Nachi-Fujikoshi

1994

- AT&T, Power Systems (first American manufacturer to win award)

1998

- Sundaram Clayton brakes division

2002

- TVS Motor Company (TVSMC)
- Hi-Tech Carbon GMPD

2003

- Brakes India Ltd., Foundry Division [India]
- Mahindra & Mahindra Ltd. (the world's first tractor company to win)
- Rane Brake Lining Ltd.
- Sona Koyo Steering Systems Ltd.

2004

- Indo Gulf Fertilisers Ltd.
- Lucas TVS Ltd.
- SRF limited

2005

- Rane Engine Valve Ltd
- Rane TRW Steering Systems Ltd.(SGD)
- Krishna Maruti Ltd., Seat Division

2006

- Sanden International (Singapore) Pte Ltd (SIS), the first Singapore-based/branch company to win.

2007

- Rane (Madras) Ltd.
- AIS Auto Glass

2008

- Tata Steel, the first integrated steel plant in Asia to win Deming award

2010

- National Engineering Industries Ltd, (India)

2011

- Sanden Vikas (India) Limited, (India)

2012

- SRF Limited, Chemicals Business (India)
- Mahindra & Mahindra Limited, Farm Equipment Sector, Swaraj Division (India)

2013

- RSB Transmissions(I) Limited, Auto Division (Jamshedpur(Unit 1), Pune & Pant Nagar Plant) (India)

2014

- GC America (USA)
- Yaskawa
- Mahindra Powerol

2016

- Ashok Leyland, Pantnagar plant - World's first commercial vehicle to get the Deming Prize (Outside Japan)

2017

- Ashok Leyland Limited, Hosur Unit II, India
- CEAT Limited, India [first tire company in the world (Outside Japan) to get Deming award]

2018

- PT Komatsu Indonesia [First Company in Indonesia, to get the Deming Prize; Mr. Pratjojo Dewo, President Director]
- Sundram Fasteners Limited, India [SFL got the Deming Prize for all its 17 plants located across India; Arathi Krishna, Managing Director, is the first woman to receive this award]
- Jsw Steel Ltd, India [President, Mr. Rajashekhar Pattanasetty]
- Indus Towers, India [CEO: Bimal Dayal]

2019

- ELGi Equipments Ltd, Coimbatore, was the first industrial air compressor manufacturer outside of Japan to win this award.

== The Deming Distinguished Service Award for Dissemination and Promotion (Overseas) ==
- 2009: Gregory H. Watson
- 2012: Janak Mehta
- 2014: Kan Trakulhoon
- 2019: Venu Srinivasan
- 2022: L Ganesh

== See also ==
- European Quality Award
- List of national quality awards
- Malcolm Baldrige National Quality Award
- Total Quality Management
