= EFQM =

Non-profit foundation

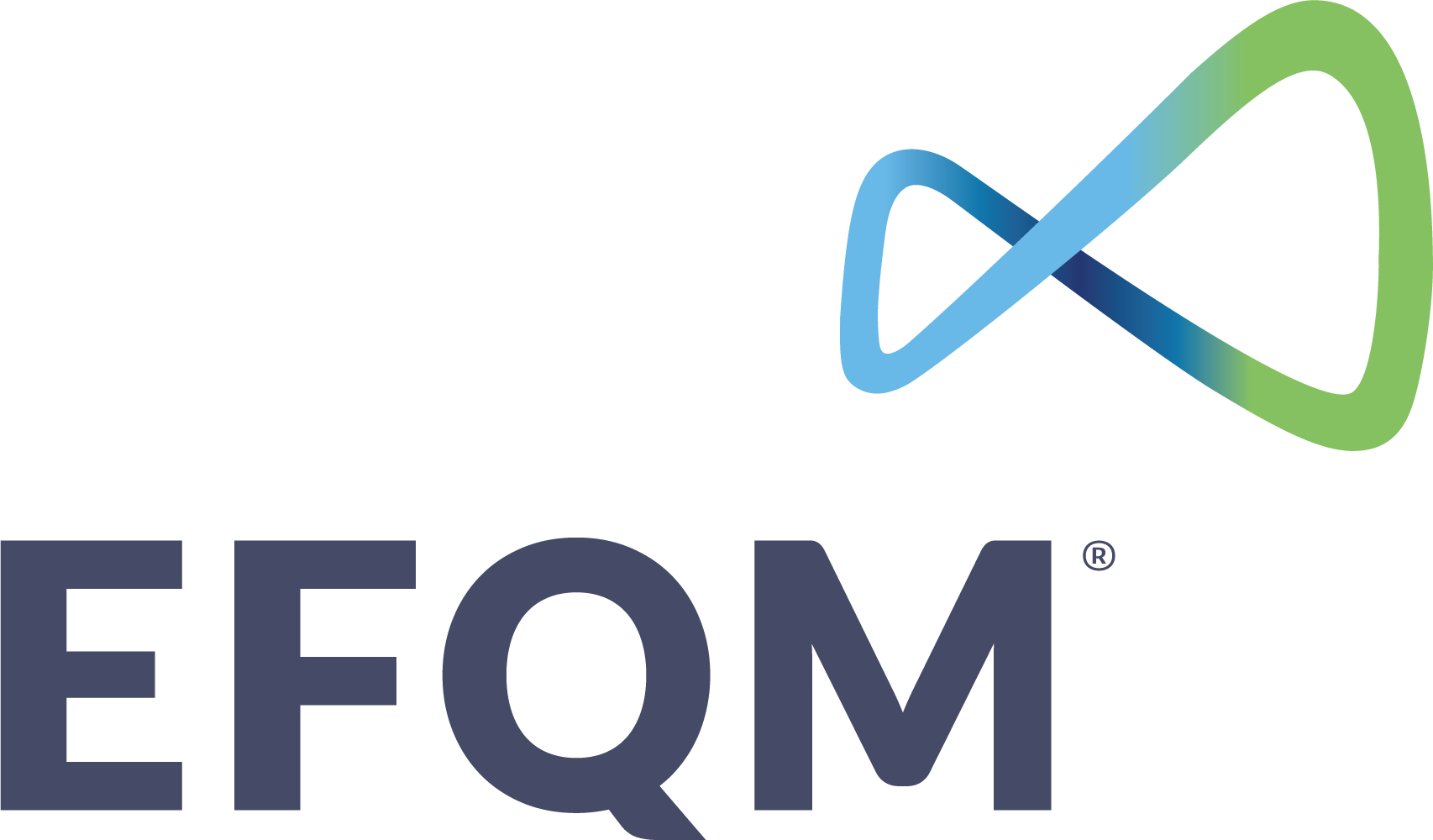
- Abbreviation: EFQM
- Formation: 15 September 1988; 38 years ago
- Founders: Jacques Delors, Umberto Agnelli, Carlo De Benedetti, Carl Hahn, sv:Anders Scharp, Jan F.A. de Soet, nl:Cor van der Klugt, Serge Dassault, Heini Lippuner, fr:Raymond Lévy, Francis Lorentz, Konrad Eckert, Iain Vallance, Fritz Fahrni, R. Morf
- Legal status: Not-for-profit member foundation
- Purpose: Promotion of business excellence
- Headquarters: Brussels, Belgium
- Coordinates: 50.86878°N 4.40423°E
- Region served: Worldwide
- Services: Training, organizational assessments
- CEO: Russell Longmuir
- Chairman: Paul G.K. Little
- Main organ: Board of directors
- Staff: 20
- Website: www.efqm.org
- Formerly called: European Foundation for Quality Management

EFQM (the European Foundation for Quality Management) is a non-profit membership foundation established in 1989 in Brussels, when CEOs of 67 European companies subscribed to the policy document and declared their commitments to EFQMs missions and values. EFQM works with over 50,000 organisations from across Europe and beyond, including organisations such as BMW, Robert Bosch, Aramco, Siemens and Huawei.

== History ==
Members from many industries set up the Foundation to develop the EFQM Excellence Model. The framework was intended to be used to support the assessment of organisations in the European Quality Award in 1992.

On 15 September 1988, 14 European business leaders met with the 8th President of the European Commission (1985-1995) Jacques Delors, and signed a letter of intent to form a European Foundation. The 14 CEOs were:

Company	Representative Business Leader
Robert Bosch GmbH	Mr. K. Eckert
British Telecommunications plc	Mr. I.D.T. Vallance
Bull SA	Mr. F. Lorentz
Ciba-Geigy AG	Mr. H. Lippuner
Dassault Aviation	Mr. S. Dassault
AB Electrolux	Mr. A. Scharp
Fiat Auto SpA	Mr. U. Agnelli
KLM	Mr. J.F.A. de Soet
Nestlé	Mr. R. Morf
C. Olivetti & C., SpA	Mr. C. De Benedetti
Philips	Mr. C.J. van der Klugt
Renault	Mr. R.H. Lévy
Sulzer AG	Mr. F. Fahrni
Volkswagen AG	Mr. Carl H. Hahn

== Activities ==
EFQM provides training services and award schemes via their management framework, the EFQM Model.

== The EFQM Model ==
The EFQM Model (known previously as the EFQM Excellence Model) is a management framework that support organisations in "managing change" and "improving performance."

A number of research studies have investigated the correlation between the adoption of holistic models such as The EFQM Model, and improved organizational results. The majority of such studies show a positive link. One tangentially related study was carried out by Vinod Singhal of the Georgia Institute of Technology and Kevin Hendricks of the College of William and Mary.

The EFQM Model, since 1989, aims to provide organisations from over 50,000 organisations with the skills to develop a culture of continuous improvement.

=== Application ===
The model is used by about 50,000 organisations across the world. In recent years, more countries have started implementing the Model, especially across the Middle East and South America.

== The EFQM Global Award ==
The EFQM Global Award is run annually by EFQM. It is designed to recognize organizations that have achieved an "outstanding level of continuous improvement", based on assessment against The EFQM Model.

== See also ==
- Total quality management
