= Corporate structure =

A typical corporate structure consists of various departments that contribute to the company's overall mission and goals. Common departments include Marketing, Finance, Operations management, Human Resource, and IT. These five divisions represent the major departments within a publicly traded company, though there are often smaller departments within autonomous firms. Many businesses have a CEO and a Board of Directors, usually composed of the directors of each department, potentially with the addition of one or more non-executive directors. There are also company presidents, vice presidents, and CFOs. However, there is a great diversity in corporate forms, as enterprises range from single company to multi-corporate conglomerate. The four main corporate structures are Functional, Divisional, Geographic, and the Matrix.

Many corporations have a “hybrid” structure, which is a combination of different models with one dominant strategy.

== Importance ==
Choosing a structure for a company is an important decision and must be strategically thought out because it could either aid or harm the making of business. The structure must also be a good fit for the type of activities, goals, and vision of the company.

== Models ==
=== Functional structure ===
This model is commonly used in single-program organizations. It is basically the standard structure mentioned earlier, which is organized around departments. This structure is most appropriate for all small organizations.

=== Divisional structure ===
Divisional structures are also called cstructures because they are based on a certain product or project. This structure is most common in multi-service organizations. Normally, it is based on the departments divided in the firm.

=== Geographic structure ===
Geographic structures are used in multi-site organizations and are frequently used by networks across different geographic areas.

=== Matrix structure ===
A matrix structure is probably the most complex of these models, as it is organised around multiple dimensions (e.g. geography and product), typically with more than one supervisor. This structure is commonly used in very large organisations because a greater volume requires greater co-ordination. However, this structure is very difficult to manage so it is usually better to reconsider its use and replace it with a different type of structure, then compensate for the trade-offs.

== Classifications ==
In addition to those models, there are other factors that make up the structure of an organization. Depending on the chain of command, a company's structure could be classified as either vertical or horizontal, as well as centralized or decentralized. A vertical structured organization or a "tall" company describes a chain of management, usually with a CEO at the top delegating authority to lower-level managers through mid-level managers. Horizontal or "flat" companies, however, have fewer middle-managers, which implies that high-level managers are more involved in daily tasks and interact with customers and front-line personnel. A centralized organizational structure describes how a company's direction and decisions are set by one individual only. Centralization complements companies with "tall" structures to create bureaucratic organizations. Decentralized organizational structures allow individuals some autonomy at each level of the business, because they join the decision-making process. Evidently, classifying organizations as centralized or decentralized is linked to them being "tall" or "flat".

== Technology ==
There is an emerging trend in the way companies shape their organizational structures. More businesses are moving towards a much flatter, decentralized organizational structure. Technological developments accelerate these organizational changes as they improve the efficiency of business, causing it to restructure departments, modify position requirements, or add and remove jobs.

== Books / authors / theorists ==
- Gareth Morgan's Images of Organization: 6 metaphors
- Frank Ostroff's "The Horizontal Organization"
- Henry Mintzberg
- Peter Senge and the Learning Organization
- Jay Galbraith's Star Model

== See also ==
- Organisational culture
- Corporate governance
- Management
- Consulting firms
- Nonprofit governing boards
- Board of directors
- Dual-listed company
- Business model
