= Solid line reporting =

In a hierarchal business organization, especially in a matrix management structure, the relationship between a worker and their direct supervisor or leader can be classified as solid-line reporting (also called direct reporting) or dotted-line reporting (also called indirect reporting). The use of "solid-line" versus "dotted-line" is based on the visual representation of the organizational structure in an organizational chart.

== Solid-line (direct) reporting ==
Solid-line reporting is a direct reporting relationship between a supervisor and their supervised worker. The supervisor provides primary guidance to the worker, controls the major financial resources on which the worker relies to perform their work, conducts performance reviews with the worker, and provides all other direct supervision. A worker who has a supervisor to whom they report directly is often called a direct report.

== Dotted-line (indirect) reporting ==
Dotted-line reporting describes a relationship between a worker and a secondary supervisor/leader who provides additional oversight and guidance to the worker in the execution of their work. The intent of the dotted-line relationship is to ensure that the dotted-line supervisor/leader has the authority to provide some level of influence and leadership to the worker, including goal-setting.

The dotted-line supervisor/leader will provide input regarding the worker's performance to the solid-line supervisor for inclusion in the worker’s annual performance review.

== Sources ==
- The Synergy of One: Creating High-Performing Sustainable Organizations ... - Michael J. Dreikorn
- Designing Your Organization: Using the STAR Model to Solve 5 Critical Design ... - Amy Kates, Jay R. Galbraith
