= Unbossing =

Unbossing may refer to:

- the great unbossing, or great flattening, in human resource management and organizational structure management
- conscious unbossing, in management
