= Private secretary =

Civil servant

A private secretary is a civil servant in a governmental department or ministry, responsible to a secretary of state or minister; or a public servant in a royal household, responsible to a member of the royal family; or a civil servant working for a senior member of the judiciary.

The role exists in the civil service of the United Kingdom and several Commonwealth countries including Australia, India and New Zealand as well as other countries influenced by the Westminster system. A private secretary is normally of middle management level; however, as the key official responsible for disseminating ministers' decisions and guidance on matters of policy, and as their gatekeeper, the role is of considerably greater significance than their grade would suggest. Depending on the status of the political principal the official works for, they may be aided by an assistant private secretary, or head a private office.

A principal private secretary, or senior private secretary, is a senior civil servant who runs a cabinet minister's private office. The Lady or Lord Chief Justice of England and Wales is also supported by a principal private secretary. A similar role to a principal private secretary in the United States federal government would be chief of staff.

In the United Kingdom, the private secretary to the sovereign is viewed as being equivalent to a permanent secretary, the head of a government department.

== In the United Kingdom ==
=== Government ===
The role of the private secretary to a secretary of state originated in the 18th century. Today, a junior minister may have a three-person private office consisting of a private secretary (PS) and two assistant private secretaries (APS); whereas a more senior minister may have a five-person private office consisting of a senior private secretary, private secretary and three assistant private secretaries. The same applies to a Cabinet-level minister's private office but on a larger scale, due to a cabinet minister usually being responsible for entire government departments and agencies.

Private secretaries who are members of the Senior Civil Service are referred to as a principal private secretary. The order of precedence is principal private secretary, senior private secretary (rarely now in existence), private secretary and assistant private secretary. A similar role to a principal private secretary in the United States federal government would be chief of staff.

The private secretary is the principal link between a government minister and officials in the department or ministry. He or she has overall responsibility for coordinating the development of the minister's policy remit, ensuring that the decisions of the minister are clearly and fully implemented by the department. In that respect a PS and an APS will often be in a position of debate with colleagues of much higher seniority, as well as be a sounding board for senior officials in the department and other ministerial private offices in Whitehall.

A PS or an APS is always in attendance with the minister at every official meeting or event to provide support; and to ensure that a member of the Civil Service, who are non-political appointees, takes a factual note of discussions and commitments made. They also have ownership of the ministerial diary, managing the minister's time with the diary secretary. This means prioritising invitations, commitments, policy briefings and submissions and parliamentary business. A PS is always the initial source of advice to Ministers on policy, parliamentary protocol, the process of cabinet government and departmental administration.

Often the PS and APS will take on specific responsibilities within the private office, dividing their minister's portfolio between them, with each PS dealing solely with policy, correspondence and diary matters relating to it. They often deputise and support other members of the PO temporarily, but would be considered subject matter experts for that area of work in the department.

Working in a private office as a private secretary or an assistant private secretary is highly desired due to widely being seen as essential for advancement to the Senior Civil Service. Although considered to be a highly rewarding and sought-after post, it is one of the most difficult when compared to others at the equivalent grade.

Depending upon the seniority of their political principal, private secretaries may be regarded as important officials in their own right; the Principal Private Secretary to the Prime Minister being the most important and is currently equivalent to a Director General in the Civil Service. Other notable positions include the Principal Private Secretary to the Secretary of State for Foreign and Commonwealth Affairs and the Private Secretary for Foreign Affairs to the Prime Minister.

A Parliamentary Private Secretary (PPS) is a member of Parliament appointed to act as unpaid assistant to a minister, and should not be confused with a private secretary.

=== The Sovereign and other royal households ===
The Private Secretary to the Sovereign is viewed as being equivalent to a Permanent Secretary, the head of a government department. Private secretaries also work in the royal households for the other working members of the British royal family. The household of the Prince of Wales, as heir apparent to the British throne, is led by a principal private secretary, who runs his private office.

=== Judiciary ===
A private secretary to a senior judge, such as the Master of the Rolls, the President of the King's Bench Division or the President of the Family Division carries out a similar function but with notable differences. By convention judges do not comment on government policy unless it is likely to impact upon the rule of law, judicial independence or the operation of the courts and tribunals. The judiciary does not therefore have a policy department, and is supported by a much smaller number of civil servants than a political principal, so a judicial private office provides advice and support directly, rather than commissioning advice from elsewhere in the department.

=== Armed Forces ===
In the British Armed Forces, the Naval Secretary, Military Secretary, and Air Secretary are senior officers appointed to advise the First Sea Lord, Chief of the General Staff, and the Chief of the Air Staff on administrative matters. The Naval Secretary was known as the Private Secretary to the First Lord of the Admiralty from 1800 to 1910.

=== In popular culture ===
A classic explanation is provided in the British sitcom Yes Minister.

Sir Humphrey (the Permanent Secretary) briefs Hacker (the Minister) on the Department's workings:

Hacker: Who else is in this department?

Sir Humphrey: Well briefly, sir, I am the Permanent Under-Secretary of State, known as the Permanent Secretary. Woolley here is your Principal Private Secretary. I too have a Principal Private Secretary and he is the Principal Private Secretary to the Permanent Secretary. Directly responsible to me are ten Deputy Secretaries, 87 Under Secretaries and 219 Assistant Secretaries. Directly responsible to the Principal Private Secretaries are plain Private Secretaries, and the Prime Minister will be appointing two Parliamentary Under-Secretaries and you will be appointing your own Parliamentary Private Secretary.
Hacker: Can they all type?
Sir Humphrey: None of us can type. Mrs MacKay types: she's the secretary.
Hacker: Pity, we could have opened an agency.
Sir Humphrey: Very droll, Minister.
Hacker: I suppose they all say that, do they?

Sir Humphrey: Certainly not, Minister. Not quite all...

(From the episode "Open Government", transmitted 25 February 1980)

== In the Commonwealth ==
=== Australia ===
In Australian Public Service the principal private secretary is the civil servant who runs a cabinet minister's private office.

=== India ===
==== Staff of the Union Cabinet ====
In India, the post of private secretary (PS) and an additional private secretary (APS) to the Union Council of Ministers of India (cabinet ministers and minister of state) are Group A (All India Services or Central Civil Services) officers, appointed by the President of India. In Prime Minister's Office (India), the private secretary to Prime Minister of India is always in the rank and post of Joint secretary to the Government of India.

==== Staff in civil services ====
Senior principal private secretary (Senior PPS) is a member of Central Secretariat Stenographers Service and is one rank above principal private secretary that takes care of the office of a secretary to the Government of India or the equivalent rank officer Member CBIC or Member Railway Board.

P.S.O. is principal staff officer, who is also a member of Central Secretariat Stenographers Service and a rank above senior principal private secretary that takes care of the office of a secretary to the Government of India or an equivalently ranked member of the Central Board for Excise and Customs, member of the Railway Board, or the chairman. Pay is equivalent to that of a director to the Government of India.

=== New Zealand ===
Persons holding the role of private secretary to a minister in New Zealand are civil servants.

Senior Private Secretaries are the equivalent of a chief of staff and have the responsibility of managing a minister's office. Members of Parliament who are appointed as a Parliamentary Under-Secretary are also entitled to appoint a Senior Private Secretary to their staff.

== Outside the Commonwealth ==
=== Hong Kong ===
The private secretary to the Chief Executive of Hong Kong is a senior civil service role that oversees part of the Chief Executive's Office. The position is currently graded at D4, equivalent to a deputy secretary of a policy bureau. Prior to the reorganisation of the office in 2005, the private secretary was the most senior civil servant in the office, serving as the chief executive's (and previously the governor's) chief of staff.

=== Japan ===
A system of the ministerial secretary (秘書官, Hishokan), one to several per minister playing a role similar to the private secretary's, is also employed by the political system in Japan. The seven secretaries appointed to the prime minister are called the executive secretaries to the prime minister (内閣総理大臣秘書官).

== See also ==
- Chief of staff
- Chef de Cabinet
- Parliamentary assistant
- Parliamentary secretary
- Permanent secretary
