= Great flattening =

Elimination of middle managers

The great flattening, also called the great unbossing, is a socio-economic and technological phenomenon in which middle managers are largely eliminated from a company, leading to a flatter and less hierarchical management structure. The term often refers to a period during the 2020s when this phenomenon became prominent in the United States, particularly with Big Tech.

== Impact ==
In the 2020s, several Big Tech companies have laid off middle management positions. These layoffs have coincided with the development of artificial intelligence models, as companies seek a way to cut costs.

For employees, flattening can have benefits, such as increased autonomy. For the company, eliminating middle management means cutting costs. However, Forbes also cites that these come with drawbacks, such as decreased morale and fewer growth opportunities.
