= Reverse hierarchy =

A reverse hierarchy (or inverted pyramid) is a conceptual organizational structure that attempts to "invert" or otherwise "reverse" the classical pyramid of hierarchical organizations.

In the proposed structure, key decisions are made by the employees in direct contact with customers, while progressively senior management positions provide support and help to the customer-facing employees.

== History and examples ==
The term "invert the pyramid" is attributed to Jan Carlzon, who transformed SAS airlines by giving front line employees authority to make decisions on the spot. The creation of the reverse hierarchy has been attributed to the Nordstrom retail organization. Other notable adopters of this structure include the United Parcel Service and Canadian Imperial Bank of Commerce.
