= Hong Kong Civil Service cruise perk =

The Hong Kong Civil Service cruise perk was a policy of the Government of Hong Kong between 1972 and 1984, whereby British expatriate members of the Hong Kong Civil Service would be contractually entitled to a free sea cruise back to the United Kingdom from Hong Kong upon their retirement.

== History ==
During the British administration of British Hong Kong, the government was having problems attracting skilled civil servants to the colony. By 1971, to help attract workers, the Hong Kong government offered various perks. In that year, a committee recommended that they offered to all civil servants who retired when they were over 50 and had 15 years of service in Hong Kong, would be entitled to a sea cruise back to the UK paid for by the Hong Kong government. The perk was introduced in 1972 and popular with expats and had a high take up as it covered both them and their families. However owing to the high cost per person (approximately HK$38,484 minimum per person) and dissent from local Hong Kongers, the Hong Kong government announced that civil servants employed after 1984 would no longer be entitled to the perk. The cruise was not a chartered one and relied on private cruise lines to run it. Usually there was only one per year that sailed from Hong Kong to the UK. There was no formal farewell ceremony beyond the Royal Hong Kong Police band playing as the ship departed Hong Kong as happened with all cruise ships.

In 1992, the government announced plans to scrap the remaining cruises in favour of a flat payment and air fare owing to the perk being viewed as outdated. Expat civil servants and trade unions opposed this citing that the government were contractually obliged to honour their perk and challenged the plans in court. The expats challenge went to the Court of Appeal where the decision was made in their favour stating that the government could not take away contracted benefits without compensation. Following the decision, the government announced it would offer to buy expatriates out of their contracts and still provide the perk prior to the handover of Hong Kong in 1997 but would keep the offer of transferring to a local contract. It was announced that after the handover, the Special Administrative Region government stated they would honour the remaining contracts as stipulated under the Hong Kong Basic Law. However 12 days after the handover, the Chief Executive of Hong Kong decreed that any civil servants that transferred to local contracts would lose the right to sea passage in keeping with the original court judgement.
