= Staff and line =

Names given to different types of functions in organizations

Staff and line are names given to different types of functions in organizations. A line function is one that directly advances an organization in its core work. This always includes production and sales, and sometimes marketing. A staff function supports the organization with specialized advisory and support functions. For example, human resources, accounting, public relations and the legal department are generally considered to be staff functions. Both terms originated in the military.

== Line functions ==
A line function, also known as a line position, is that which is directly involved with meeting the organization's core goals and objectives. Typically, these functions are related to areas such as production and sales, marketing and service delivery. These functions are crucial for meeting the organisation’s primary objectives. The focus of these positions is solely on the core operations of the organisation. The responsibility for meeting the organisation's proposed targets is directly linked to line positions. In a hierarchical organisation structure, these would generally be positioned near the core operations of an organisation and would report to higher management.

== Staff functions ==
A staff function is an alternate function of people in a business that do not partake instantly in an activity as they help the line functions to reach their targets. The business world is changing very rapidly and each day new kinds of issues and problems crop up. It requires specialised input to deal with these changing conditions. It requires specialists to be available who can provide appropriate business solutions. This is the benefit of the "staff function". It provides the line function with advisory and specialist support.

Staff functions are added to help line managers in meeting their objectives. The tendency for the scope and role of effective managers to increase, sometimes to untenable levels, can be greatly mitigated by an able staff function providing invaluable support to enable a full management role to be expressed within the time and cost bounds of the job.

A specialised performance improvement staff function is needed to support the development of performance improvement skills and to help coordinate performance improvement work in the rest of the organisations. Thus helping a business organisation to work more efficiently and effectively. Staff functions like human resources can become smaller and actually have a greater impact on the business.

A business can usually survive the failure of, or use substitutes for, the staff function. Staff functions vary between businesses, but usually include activities like advertising, human resources, environmental health & safety (EHS) positions, and plant maintenance.

=== Disadvantages ===
1. Conflict can occur when the scopes of work and position roles & responsibilities are not clearly defined and enforced between line and staff functionaries. Decision making can be delayed or strained if executives of the staff function are misinterpreted or if the balance of structural power is not properly aligned between line functions, staff functions, and organizational goals.
2. There is a large amount of hope and expectancy from the person that has authority as the productivity of the structure is dependent on the person that has high authority.

=== Advantages ===
1. Staff functions are vastly important due to the need for their subject matter expertise, technical advice, and careful eye for detailed analysis of an altering business situation.
2. Staff functions often use careful evidence based advisement and systems planning to meet the assigned tasks and challenges.
3. There is scope of flexibility for staff functions to take more responsibility in the interest of organisation.
4. Staff specialists can work more effectively for long term performance improvement unhampered by the pressures of day to day problems.
5. Staff functional support is most advantageous when line and staff roles & responsibilities are clearly defined within the organization structure and all individuals are held accountable.

== Organizational lifecycle ==
Organizations begin as line-only, with line managers having direct control over all activities, including administrative ones. Only later, as organizations grow in size, do they add staff positions.

== Relative authority ==
Line units tend to have more employees than staff units.

Staff positions have four kinds of authority: "advise authority", offering advice to line managers who may ignore it; "compulsory advice" or "compulsory consultation" in which line managers must consider staff advice, but can choose not to heed it; "concurrent authority," in which a line manager must seek the agreement of a staffer, and "functional authority" in which the staff person has formal authority over his or her specialty and its employees. Common types of functional authority for staff positions include authority over recruiting standards, reimbursement policies and quality standards.

Staff workers derive influence from their expertise, from their control of potentially vital information, and from their closer access to upper management.

== Conflicts ==
It is common for line and staff workers to come into conflict. Staff specialists say line workers avoid and ignore them, while line workers say staff workers do not understand the organization's core work, distract them, and get in their way. Sociologist Melville Dalton attributed this to "the conspicuous ambition and individualistic behavior among staff managers," staff's anxiety to justify their existence, and the dependence of staff managers on line managers. Other management theorists have observed that line managers sometimes resent staff advisors who are younger and better-educated than they are. Others attribute the problem to staff managers who do not realize that even though they have been delegated authority in particular areas, their primary role is to serve and support line managers. Management textbooks advise resolving line-staff conflict by explicitly recognizing the mutual dependency of the two, making it clear what the staff role is, de-emphasizing any controlling elements of the staff role, having staff deliberately set out to win the confidence and trust of line workers, and emphasizing the staff role as part of the team.

== Downsizing of staff function ==
In the 1980s many large companies downsized. Typically, staff jobs were disproportionately eliminated. (For example, IBM cut its staff positions from 7,000 to 3,000, and CBS cut hundreds of staff positions from its New York headquarters.) Thereafter, more new MBA graduates began aspiring to line positions.

Increasingly organizations, especially smaller ones, are moving away from line-staff structures to structures that are more hybrid or matrixed.

== See also ==
- Line officer
