= Functional manager =

A functional manager is a person who has management authority over an organizational unit—such as a department—within a business, company, or other organization. Functional managers have ongoing responsibilities, and are not usually directly affiliated with project teams, other than ensuring that goals and objectives align with the organization's overall strategy and vision.

In both traditional and matrix organizations, the control of the resources is centered on the functional managers.

== Subject-matter expert ==
- Give professional suggestion and provide direction to others within a department or section.
- Convey knowledge to other employees.

== Work management ==
- Tracking processes and managing tasks.
- Have understanding of their function's resources priorities and allocates resources to achieve better efficiency.

== Process improvement ==
- Identify and address the inefficiency.
- Provide necessary tools and coaching and education.
- Establish standards and best practices.

The roles of functional managers can be defined by obligation and authorities:

- Obligation means functional managers have to evaluate and assess the overall effectiveness and also give pertinent suggestion about resources allocation. They also have responsibility to make sure that the performance of their functions has been improved continuously and also to enhance cross-function integration.
- Authorities refer the rights of functional managers to establish specific standards and prescribe training and reporting, thus to help the compliance of the organization's policies and requirements.

== The skills of functional managers ==
To achieve an organization's objectives, functional managers need a number of specific skills—for example: communication skills, decision-making skills, and interpersonal skills.

- Technical skills are essential for functional managers, because they require specific knowledge and capabilities to accomplish their tasks.
- Communication skills refer to a functional manager's ability to transfer the information to others effectively and efficiently. Functional managers need to convey information to subordinates so that subordinates are able to understand what is expected from higher authorities. Once they better understand overall goals and requirements, they work with colleagues to achieve the organization's goals.
- Decision making skills require functional managers to have the ability to weight the positives and negatives of each decision. Moreover, this skill also requires functional managers to recognize problems and opportunities quickly and correctly. They should then take appropriate actions to solve the problems or to capitalize on the opportunities.
- Functional managers also need interpersonal skills because they need to get along with people within or outside their function, for example, senior managers or investors. Sometimes they need to face customers as well.
- Time management skills are also essential for functional managers, as they need to manage their work efficiently and delegate appropriately. A good functional manager should be able to accomplish tasks on time.

Although the skills above are important for all types of managers, their relative importance tends to vary by function. For example, finance functional managers need to have skills in fundraising and financial analysis.

== Distinguish ==
Functional manager vs. project manager
Functional managers and project managers have different roles and duties within an organization. Functional managers are accountable to manage people with specific skills and different resources within a department or section to meet functional objectives as well as corporate objectives. Project managers must bring people together from different functions and specific skills to accomplish specialized tasks within a required time. Sometimes, both functional managers and project managers have to work together to share resources and experience. This may help to improve efficiency and overall performance.

Functional manager vs. strategic manager
The strategic manager must view each action as it relates to the organization's larger strategic mission. They help the top leadership to prioritize business objectives and also help to provide strategies to capitalize opportunities and to avoid potential risks. Strategic managers should always have excellent analytical and problem-solving skills. However, the functional managers can concentrate on what is best for their specific sector.

Functional manager vs. line manager
Functional manager are always responsible for how their functions are carried out, and how their employees work to meet functional objectives. However, a line manager directly manages other employees and is responsible for administrative management of individuals. If someone refers to their "boss" they mean the individual who is their line manager.

== Examples of functional managers ==
A functional manager is in charge of a specific business unit or section, such as Finance or Sales. Here are some examples of functional managers:

- Customer service manager
- Sales manager
- Development team manager
- Accounts Receivable manager
- EMC Test Laboratory Manager

== See also ==
- Business manager
- General manager
