= Line management =

Management of directly involved employees

Line management refers to the management of employees who are directly involved in the production or delivery of products, goods and/or services and may be referred to as the supervisor. As the interface between an organisation and its front-line workforce, line management represents the lowest level of management within an organisational hierarchy (as distinct from top/executive/senior management and middle management).

A line manager is an employee who directly manages other employees and day-to-day operations while reporting to a higher-ranking manager. In some retail businesses, they may have titles such as head cashier or department supervisor. Related job titles are supervisor, section leader, foreperson, office manager and team leader. They are charged with directing employees and controlling that the corporate objectives in a specific functional area or line of business are met.

Despite the name, line managers are usually considered as part of the organization's workforce and not part of its management class.

== Responsibilities ==
Line managers are responsible for implementing and enabling, through their staff, an organisation's people policies and practices in alignment with business objectives and core values.

Their main functions with respect to employees include:

- recruitment and selection,
- training, mentoring, coaching and staff development,
- performance management and appraisal,
- motivation,
- well-being,
- team building,
- reaching the team goals.

Line managers' activities typically include:

- planning the aims, objectives and priorities of their work area and communicating this to staff as appropriate;
- deploying the resources within their control (e.g., staff time; funding) to achieve plans;
- complying with policy and legislation;
- providing structure, direction and purpose to their teams;
- scheduling regular meetings with staff members to discuss progress and any issues.

Line management is also responsible for adopting (with the support of senior management) any type of organizational culture change.

The line management function will often cross into other functions vital to the success of a business such as human resources, finance, and risk management. Indeed, at corporations, responsibility for risk management is vested with line management. Human resources obligations are also increasingly being assigned or "devolved" to line managers.

== See also ==
- Staff management
- Project management
- Performance management
- Staff and line
- Employee engagement
- Management by objectives
- Operations management
