= Boxology =

A boxology is a representation of an organized structure as a graph of labeled nodes ("boxes") and connections between them (as lines or arrows). The concept is useful because many problems in systems design are reducible to modular "black boxes" and connections or flow channels between them. The term is somewhat tongue-in-cheek and refers to the generic nature of diagrams containing labelled nodes and (sometimes directed) paths between them.

The archetypical example of a boxology is a corporate "org chart", which describes lines of control through the corporation. Other boxologies include programming flow charts, system-level circuit diagrams for designing large complex circuits, and even economic models. Feynman diagrams are useful because they reduce the complicated mathematics of quantum mechanics to a simple boxology of particle interactions.

Depending on application, the boxes are optional; for example, the global carbon cycle is modeled as a boxology, but many figures explaining the model include only labels and directed connections.
