= Middle management =

Intermediate management level of a hierarchy

Middle management is the intermediate management level of a hierarchical organization that is subordinate to the executive management and responsible for "team leading" line managers and/or "specialist" line managers. Middle management is indirectly (through line management) responsible for junior staff performance and productivity.

Unlike line management, middle management is considered to be a senior (or semi-executive) position as middle managers are authorized to speak and act on behalf of the organisation to line managers, junior staff and customers. Included in this level of management are division, plant and department managers.

American business historian Alfred D. Chandler Jr. argued in The Visible Hand (1977) that in the nineteenth century, Adam Smith's invisible hand was supplanted by the "visible hand" of middle management, which became "the most powerful institution in the American economy". He credited middle managers with a central importance like the inventors, empire builders, and financiers.

A 2023 study in the American Journal of Sociology found that middle management has increased over time and that the role of middle management increasingly revolves around the task of collaboration rather than supervision.

== Role in an organization ==
=== Functions of a middle manager ===
A middle manager is a link between the senior management and the lower (junior) levels of the organization. Due to involvement into day-to-day running of a business, middle managers have the opportunity to report valuable information and suggestions from the inside of an organization. They are in charge of putting into practice guidelines established previously in the strategic plans by top level managers. Moreover, the middle manager is a channel of communication within the organization, as they pass on major decisions of executives and the main goals of an organization to lower levels of employees. This contributes to better coordination between workers and makes a company more united.

The primary responsibility of a middle manager is to implement a strategy, created by the executive level, in the most efficient way possible. In order to reach the target goals, a manager may adjust and interpret the initial plan. Other functions can be divided into three main categories:

- Technical

Middle managers are responsible for facilitating any necessary changes within an organization and creating an effective working environment. They oversee daily routines, monitor performance, and ensure that everything is done in compliance with the organization's needs.

- Human resources

One of the most important functions of a middle manager is motivating, leading and inspiring their subordinates. This also includes building a team and supporting any team member when necessary.

- Strategic

Strategic functions involve analyzing a subordinate group in terms of productivity and financial effectiveness, creating a strategy of improving the current situation and reporting to the executive management in the form of attending a boardroom meeting or a discussion.

=== Competencies ===
A number of competencies are critical to become an effective middle manager.

- Leadership. The most important competency that consists of many skills. As an inherent leader, middle managers have to possess sense-making and persuading skills. They must be able to motivate, influence and guide their subordinates, become a role model for them, demonstrate the quality and the level of work contribution necessary for the organization and engage in continuous self-development and learning.
- Decision-making. Ability to quickly solve the problems, make decisions under pressure and take responsibility for the outcome.
- Creativity & Visioning. Managers should have a clear vision of the strategy implementation and be creative in overcoming the possible difficulties.
- Performance management. Involves managing the performance of subordinates and, specifically, the line managers, effectively, by setting clear and measurable objectives for them and provide coaching. Middle managers must be also skilled in presenting, persuading and influencing people.

=== Middle manager vs. line manager ===
A middle management position is often mistakenly described as a similar to the line management one. However, there are some differences:

- Middle manager is a semi-executive position – line managers are promoted to become middle managers. Thus, middle managers enjoy greater salary, benefits and a closer position to a boardroom.
- System of subordination – line managers are subordinate to middle managers. Middle managers are responsible for large teams and are unable to control performance of every single individual. Thus, direct or line manager measures the team performance and reports to the middle manager.
- Set of duties – unlike line managers, who have a clear procedure of work and set of duties, middle managers have only target goals. The way of achieving those goals is decided by the manager independently.

== Criticism ==
The role of middle management is subject to a number of criticisms. This position is often seen as unnecessary, and middle managers are blamed or lampooned for holding the organization back from achieving its full potential and using their influence for their own purposes.

=== Influence ===
Middle management is often accused of possessing too much influence. Their central position in an organization allows them to influence strategy and actions in "both upward and downward direction". When supplying information to the executive level, middle managers interpret it subjectively and may insinuate it with their own opinion and evaluation. Further, proximity to the boardroom makes it easy for the manager to promote their own interests, by "synthesizing" the information and presenting data from a certain strategic perspective. The same level of influence can be exploited by a middle manager towards the lower staff.

=== Resistance ===
Middle managers' reluctance to lose control in their teams and satisfaction with a settled situation could lead to their resistance in any changes in the strategy or direction of an organization. Usually, the resistance does not take an aggressive form such as refusal to carry out tasks or unconcealed confrontation, but result in a lack of support and eagerness to convey only those tasks, impact of which is clearly visible to the top management. This creates barriers to a growth of a company and lags the overall working process.

=== Necessity ===
The overall necessity of middle managers in an organization is questioned. They are said to be too costly, non-effective and constantly under-performing employees. It has been stated that middle managers do not carry out their main duties of linking the organization and reporting effectively, which leads to a block of communication between different levels of staff. Thus, as rapid growth of globalization put pressures on businesses in terms of cost effectiveness and speed of information flow within the organization, middle management make companies less flexible and competitive.

== Future ==
The development of information technology has enabled an increase in the span of control and reduced the need for middle management. Moreover, an increasing number of modern organizations are becoming flatter and downsized in pursuit of flexibility, higher competitiveness, and innovation. According to David Williams, flat organizations promote greater intercommunication and efficiency among workers. As a result, many organizations are being restructured, middle management is being reduced, and their roles are considered outdated and unnecessary.

At the same time, there is still a need in a middle manager as an employee and they continue playing a significant role in organizations, specifically in setting an overall strategy and targets. Changes in the global market forced them to become more flexible, stress-resistant, acquire new skills.

Younger generations are reportedly consciously avoiding traditional management roles, instead preferring roles offering autonomy and work-life balance. Termed "conscious unbossing", the focus on self-care over traditional hierarchical advancement is more prevalent in Generation Z.

In 2026, business media also reported on "job-dropping", a related pattern in which workers turn down promotions or move into roles with fewer responsibilities in order to protect their wellbeing or work-life balance. In surveys by the career platform Kickresume, 70% of respondents said they would prioritise their mental wellbeing over a higher-paying job, and 29% of surveyed parents said they had been looking for a less demanding role since having children. The lack of interest in middle management has raised concerns about the potential death of managers in coming years. The term stems from conscious uncoupling.
