= Hong Kong Civil Service =

The Hong Kong Civil Service is managed by 13 policy bureaux in the Government Secretariat, and 67 departments and agencies, mostly staffed by civil servants. The Secretary for the Civil Service (SCS) is one of the Principal Officials appointed under the Accountability System and a Member of the Executive Council. The Secretary for the Civil Service heads the Civil Service Bureau (CSB) of the Government Secretariat and is responsible to the Chief Executive (CE) for civil service policies as well as the overall management and development of the civil service. The primary role of the Secretary for the Civil Service is to ensure that the civil service serves the best interests of the community and delivers various services in a trustworthy, efficient and cost effective manner. The CSB assumes overall policy responsibility for the management of the civil service, including such matters as appointment, pay and conditions of service, staff management, manpower planning, training, and discipline.

== Appointment ==
Appointments to the civil service are based on open and fair competition. Candidates have to go through competitive appointment processes and are appointed only if they possess the qualifications and capabilities required for the job. Vacancies can be filled by promotion from within the service. In the case of basic ranks or where promotion is not possible or where there is a special need, vacancies are filled by open recruitment. To achieve the target of reducing the civil service establishment, the Government implemented a general recruitment freeze to the civil service with effect from 1 April 2003, with exemption granted only on very exceptional circumstances. Entry requirements for civil service posts in general are set on the basis of academic or professional qualifications obtainable from local institutions or professional bodies (or equivalent), technical skills, work experience, language proficiency and other qualities and attributes as required. To achieve the aim of a civil service which is biliterate (Chinese and English) and trilingual (generally conversant in spoken Cantonese, English and Mandarin), language proficiency in Chinese and English is also required. From January 2003 onwards, for civil service posts requiring degree or professional qualifications, applicants should pass the two language papers (Use of Chinese and Use of English) in the Common Recruitment Examination before job application. For civil service posts with general academic qualifications set below degree level, applicants should attain at least Grade E in Chinese and English (Syllabus B) in the Hong Kong Certificate of Education Examination, or equivalent. In accordance with the Basic Law, new recruits appointed on or after 1 July 1997 must be permanent residents of the Hong Kong Special Administrative Region, save for certain specified exceptions.

== Promotion ==
Officers are promoted on the criteria of character, ability, experience and prescribed qualifications. All eligible officers are considered on an equal basis. The officer selected for promotion must be the most meritorious one who is able and ready to perform duties at a higher rank.

== Ranks and Pay Scales ==
| Level | Positions in English | Positions in Chinese |
|---|---|---|
| Directorate Pay Scale Point 8 (D8) | Administrative Officer Staff Grade A1, Permanent Secretary of Bureau | 首長級甲一級政務官、決策局常任秘書長 |
| Directorate Pay Scale Point 7 (D7) | Vacancy | 懸空 |
| Directorate Pay Scale Point 6 (D6) | Administrative Officer Staff Grade A, Head of Department | 首長級甲級政務官、部門首長 |
| Directorate Pay Scale Point 5 (D5) | Head of Department | 部門首長 |
| Directorate Pay Scale Point 4 (D4) | Administrative Officer Staff Grade B1, Deputy Secretary of Bureau | 首長級乙一級政務官、決策局副秘書長 |
| Directorate Pay Scale Point 3 (D3) | Administrative Officer Staff Grade B, Deputy Secretary of Bureau, deputy director of Department | 首長級乙級政務官、決策局副秘書長、部門副署/處長 |
| Directorate Pay Scale Point 2 (D2) | Administrative Officer Staff Grade C, Principal Assistant Secretary of Bureau, assistant director of department, District Officer, Senior Principal Executive Officer | 首長級丙級政務官、決策局首席助理秘書長、部門助理署/處長、民政事務專員、高級首席行政主任 |
| Directorate Pay Scale Point 1 (D1) | Chief professional, Chief staff officer, Principal Executive Officer | 主管級專業人員、主管級行政人員、首席行政主任 |
| Master Pay Scale Point 45 to 49 | Senior Administrative Officer, chief executive officer | 高級政務主任、總行政主任 |
| Master Pay Scale Point 34 to 44 | Administrative Officer, Senior Executive Officer | 政務主任、高級行政主任 |
| Master Pay Scale Point 28 to 33 | Administrative Officer, Executive Officer I | 政務主任、一級行政主任 |
| Master Pay Scale Point 15 to 27 | Executive Officer II, Senior Clerical Officer, Clerical Officer | 二級行政主任、高級文書主任、文書主任 |
| Master Pay Scale Point 0 to 14 | Assistant Clerical Officer, Clerical Assistant | 助理文書主任、文書助理 |

== Public Service Commission ==
The commission is an independent statutory body responsible for advising the CE on civil service appointment, promotion and disciplinary matters. In practice, the advice is rendered to the SCS and the CSB deals with the commission on individual cases. The chairman and members of the commission are appointed by the CE. The commission seeks to ensure the impartiality and fairness in appointments to the civil service and also advises on discipline matters. In accordance with the Public Service Commission Ordinance, advice of the commission has to be sought for appointment or promotion of officers to middle and senior ranking posts (excluding the disciplined ranks of the Hong Kong Police Force). The commission is also consulted on changes in appointment procedures applicable to civil service posts.

== Independent advisory bodies on pay and conditions of service ==
Three independent bodies advise the Government on matters relating to pay and conditions of service. Their members are selected from outside the Government.

- The Standing Committee on Directorate Salaries and Conditions of Service advises on matters affecting the directorate.
- The Standing Commission on Civil Service Salaries and Conditions of Service advises on the principles and practices governing the pay and conditions of service of all non-directorate staff except those in the judicial and disciplined services.
- The Standing Committee on Disciplined Services Salaries and Conditions of Service advises on the pay and conditions of service of all disciplined services staff except the heads of the services who remain under the purview of the Standing Committee on Directorate Salaries and Conditions of Services.
- The Standing Commission on Judicial Salaries and Conditions of Services advises on the structure, and matters relating to the system, institutional structure, methodology and mechanism for the determination of judicial salary.

== Key pay principles of civil service ==
The objective of civil service pay is to offer sufficient remuneration to attract, retain, and motivate staff of suitable calibre to provide quality service to the public. Both civil servants and the general public should view the pay for civil service fair. Broad Comparability with the private sector is important when considering the pay for the civil servants. This pay principle was sourced from the recommendations of the Royal Commission on the Civil Service in 1953. In 1965, the Commission further suggested that the principle of fair comparison should be weighted the most among all other considerations, including internal relatives, which is being emphasised too much in the past, commented by the Task Force on the HKSAR Civil Service Pay System.

== Training and development ==
Job-related training is arranged by departments while induction and grade-specific management training are generally provided by respective grade management. The CSB provides training and development support to departments through its Civil Service Training and Development Institute. There are four core service areas: senior executive development, national studies programmes, human resources management consultancy service and promotion of a continuous learning culture. Senior executive development programmes include leadership development and national studies programmes for directorate and potential directorate officers. Advisory services on Human Resources Development (HRD) and succession planning are also provided. National studies programmes include courses at Mainland institutes such as the National School of Administration, Foreign Affairs University, Tsinghua University and Peking University. There are also local programmes on national affairs and the Basic Law, as well as staff exchange programme with the Mainland. An e-learning portal, the Cyber Learning Centre Plus is intended to promote a continuous learning culture. The institute also disseminates best practices in HRD through its advisory services in training needs analysis, learning strategies, development of competency profiles, and performance management systems.

== Performance management ==
Through the performance appraisal process, staff at different levels are made aware of the standard of performance expected of them. Management of the process helps maximise individual performance and enhance the corporate efficiency and effectiveness of the civil service as a whole. As an integral part of the overall human resource management functions, it is a major tool in human resource planning (e.g. succession planning), development (e.g. training and job rotation), and management (e.g. confirmation, promotion, posting and disciplinary action). Performance appraisal of staff is an ongoing process. Appraisal reports are normally completed annually. Transparency and objectivity of the appraisal process are also emphasised. To improve the system, department management is encouraged to put in place assessment panels to undertake levelling and moderating work among appraisal reports, identify under-performers/outstanding performers for appropriate action, adopt other management tools including target-based assessment and core competencies assessment. The Long and Meritorious Service Travel Award Scheme, the Long and Meritorious Service Award Scheme and the Retirement Souvenir Scheme provide additional rewards. A commendation system also exists to give recognition to exemplary performance.

Performance Appraisal in Hong Kong Civil Service

The performance management system in the Hong Kong Civil Service forms a fundamental part of the Hong Kong Government's strategy in handling human resources issues of civil servants. The process allows supervisors to better communicate individual work targets and expected standards to civil servants. The monitor and review process embedded in the system also provides a systematic mechanism for supervisors to identify individual strengths and weaknesses, hence providing relevant training and development as is necessary.

The Civil Service Bureau issues Circular Memorandums and updates its Performance Management Guide to managers in bureaus and departments periodically to ensure performance management in the civil service is practised in a comprehensive, transparent, objective, and timely manner.

1. Appraisal process

The performance appraisal system is designed to be multi-perspective, which involves assessment of three tiers of appraisers: the Appraising Officer, the Countersigning Officer and Reviewing Officer. As a continuous cycle, appraisers would complete appraisal reports annually and review the performance of appraisees continuously. The appraisal system operates based on a continuous performance management cycle of four phases, including: (i) Performance planning, (ii) continuous coaching and development, (iii) interim review and (iv) performance appraisal.

1.1 Performance planning

The appraisee and the Appraising Officer would reach a consensus on the list of main objectives or responsibilities for the upcoming reporting period at the beginning of the cycle. The agreed list details the objectives of the unit and broad areas of responsibilities. Notably, the targets should align with overall departmental objectives and are specific, measurable, attainable as well as time-bound.

However, the list of responsibilities and specific performance results are job-dependent. It is key that the list provides a yardstick to objectively discuss, monitor and evaluate performance.

Ultimately, the targets should be clearly communicated and well-perceived by the appraisee. Should changes to job responsibilities occur, they should be followed by reviews and revisions of the list.

1.2 Continuous coaching and development

In order to provide direction and feedback, regular guidance and supervision of appraisees are required. The immediate feedback would allow appraisees to adjust their behaviours in a timely manner and understand how it corresponds to their actions.

The feedback should be balanced, specific and constructive. It should focus on both unsatisfactory and exemplary performance such that means to overcome difficulties or reinforcing commendable behaviours are made known to the appraisees. 1.3 Interim review

An interim or mid-year review will be conducted to provide feedback to the appraisee regarding their performance in the middle of the appraisal period. It involves a formal discussion between the Appraising officer and the appraisee in the form of a structured session. The objectives of the interim review are as follows:

- Recognize good performance results that are above target and identify performance results that are below target, hence the provision of guidance for improvement.

- Determine the effectiveness of existing performance management measures and identify training needs of civil servants to provide appropriate assistance.

- Point out problems hindering appraisee's performance and offer preventive measures.

- Make adjustments to the agreed objectives if needed.

1.4 Performance appraisal

Performance appraisal refers to the formal assessment of the performance results of the appraisee during the appraisal period. It reviews the (i) effectiveness of the deliverance of agreed objectives and targets, (ii) constraints and hindrances affecting the effectiveness, (iii) the strengths and weaknesses of the appraisee that has influenced or will influence the appraisee's further development, and (iv) potential personal or career development and training proposals.

1.4.1 Rating scale

Appraisees are assessed based on rating scales. Specifically, a six-grade performance scale is often adopted for appraising purposes. To illustrate, appraisees are given grades of (i) outstanding, (ii) very effective, (iii) effective, (iv) moderate, (v) poor and (vi) very poor performance.

1.4.1.1 Rating Scale in practice

In 2020, the former Civil Service Training and Development Institute collaborated with 5 departments to review the design of the rating scales to better align the rating scale with appraisees' performance and the needs of the grades concerned.

In 2021, 4 more departments reviewed their appraisal forms together with the Civil Service Training and Development Institute. The revised rating scales are now more clearly defined and discriminative.

1.4.1.2 Fairness and openness of the appraisal system

The following requirements and guidelines are set out to ensure the impartiality and transparency of the system:

(i) The assessment should be shown to the appraisee before the appraisal interview

(ii) The appraisal form should be filled out by the countersigning officers before the appraisal interview

(iii) Both parties should be involved in the preparation and signing process of the interview record

(iv) The appraisal interview should be conducted face-to-face with effective two-way communication

When necessary, Heads of Departments or Grades could consider setting up an assessment panel (see section 6.1) to ensure the fairness and smoothness of the appraisal process.

2. Post-appraisal Follow-up

2.1 Appeal Mechanism

Under the open reporting system, the appraisee has to sign on the interview record to confirm that they have read and understood the content of the appraisal report.

If the appraisee disagrees with the assessment made on him or her, the Appraising Officer should note down the disagreement in the record of the interview column. The appraisee can sign to indicate that they have read the written note in the interview report.

If the appraisee disputed the interview record, they may add this as a remark when signing the appraisal report. If the appraisee refused to sign the report, the Appraising Officer should note down this point in the interview record .

Besides, the appraisee may appeal separately to senior officers or Heads of Departments or Grades if they feel aggrieved. The complaint or appeal should be handled as much as possible through the performance management system . Heads of Department or Grade are normally the ultimate authority to determine on such complaints or appeals and the related follow-up actions .

2.2 Training and career development initiatives

The training and career development initiatives advanced in the appraisal should serve as a useful reference for Appraising Officers to develop appraisees' capabilities. It is also necessary that the grade management follow up with the appraisees on the newly established initiatives promptly and appropriately.

2.3 Implications for future training and development

When common themes for training and development are identified in appraisees' performance appraisals, they should be incorporated into future training and development proposals for both the department and grade.

In practice, the Public Service Commission reported that customised training sessions were arranged for 19 departments in 2020. They aimed to improve performance management skills for supervising officers. To enhance the communication and management skills for departmental grade managers, 2 tailor-made training programmes were also held in 2020.

3. Addressing performance

A main objective of the Civil Service performance management system is such that good performance can be duly recognized and acknowledged, while underperforming civil servants can be identified for further training and guidance.

3.1 Rewarding good performers

3.1.1 Increments

3.1.1.1 Policy

In addition to being remunerated based on the annually adjusted pay scale, civil servants are entitled to advance one increment per year within their respective grade scales if they displayed satisfactory performance (including conduct, diligence and efficiency) throughout the year.

Such in-scale increments would be given until the civil servants reach the maximum point of their pay scales. As of 1 April 2021, a total of 68,387 civil servants had already reached their maximum pay points. This means that they will not be considered for the granting, stoppage or deferral of increments, but are still subject to the annual performance appraisals.

3.1.1.2 Granting of increments in practice

While there is no specific service-wide quota for the granting, stoppage and deferment of increments, it has been observed by scholars that civil servants are typically awarded the annual increments unless they receive the lowest or the second lowest level of overall rating in their performance appraisals.

With only an average of around 10 civil servants being subject to the stoppage or deferral of increments annually during the 5-year period between 2015 and 2020, the increment practices of the Hong Kong Civil Service had been under criticism by academics and others, including Legislative Council members, for being over-lenient and merely based on formalities.

3.1.2 Promotion

Open recruitment is only allowed in very special circumstances. The typical method for filling vacancies in higher ranks in the Hong Kong Civil Service is by promotion of civil servants from a lower rank in the same grade. According to the guidelines issued by the Civil Service Bureau, such promotion should be based entirely on merit, taking into account the personal character, ability, and qualifications of the individual.

Some scholars have, however, expressed the concern that, due to the tradition in some Government departments where senior civil servants are given the best grading out of the 6-level grading scale in their performance appraisals, in practice, promotion is largely based on seniority rather than individual merits.

3.1.3 Commendation by various award schemes

Apart from giving recognition to outstanding civil servants via promotion or commendation under the existing appraisal system, various commendation schemes are available for rewarding civil servants or bureaus or departments with meritorious performance, aiming to motivate civil servants to provide public service and perform their responsibilities with consistent quality. These rewards and recognition motivate civil servants to provide upgraded quality of their service.

The Hong Kong Special Administrative Region Honours and Awards System

Created since the Handover of Hong Kong in 1997, the Hong Kong honours system is a community-wide honours for which civil servants with great contribution to the public will be nominated. Awardees will receive recognition and awards from the Chief Executive.

The Commendation Letter Scheme

The Commendation Letter Scheme aims to recognise individual civil servants who have contributed substantially to the efficiency and positive image of their bureaus or departments. This Scheme is administered at the bureau and department level, and commendation letters would be issued on behalf of Permanent Secretaries or Heads of Bureaus or Departments.

The Secretary for the Civil Service's Commendation Award Scheme

The Secretary for the Civil Service's Commendation Award Scheme is seen as an award tier which lies between the Honours and Awards System and the Commendation Letter Scheme. It is an annual award that recognises individual civil servants who showed consistently good performance for at least five consecutive years. Nominations of the Award are made by Permanent Secretaries or Heads of Departments or Grades, with the ultimate decision to be made by the Secretary for the Civil Service on the recommendation of an Award Committee.

Award recipients will be awarded a certificate of recognition and a gold pin. Specifically, award recipients who have served the Hong Kong Civil Service for over 20 years and have yet to enjoy any government sponsored travel outside Hong Kong, will be awarded a one-off travel grant.

The Civil Service Outwarding Service Award Scheme

On the department and team levels, the Civil Service Bureau introduced the biennial Civil Service Outstanding Service Award Scheme in 1999, recognising teams and departments that had provided quality and customer-oriented public service. Awards under the Scheme are granted at the team, departmental and interdepartmental levels, and their practices are publicised among the Civil Service to promote wider adoption of the practices.

Long and Meritorious Service Travel Award Scheme

The Long and Meritorious Service Travel Award Scheme targets local non-directorate officers in the Hong Kong Civil Service who have consistently performed very well for over 20 years, and have not received any government travel award before. Award recipients will be granted a one-off travel allowance.

3.2 Managing poor performance

To maintain a merit-based and efficient civil service, the performance management system of the Hong Kong Civil Service uses a variety of administrative and management mechanisms to identify underperformers and help them reach the expected standards of performance. Relevant actions will be taken if they continue to be unable to deliver work at the expected level.

Stoppage of increments

According to the Civil Service Regulations 451 and 452, only if the appraisee's work performance, including conduct (fidelity, obedience to orders, propriety) and diligence (meaning steady application, attentiveness to duties and industry), was satisfactory during the appraisal period, they can only be granted an increment.

For civil servants who have not yet reached the maximum pay point of their rank, the appraisees' performance has to reach the required level during the appraisal period to earn an increment on their next incremental date. If the appraiser does not certify that the appraisee's performance of work was satisfactory during the appraisal period, the appraisee will not be paid any increments for three to six months from their next incremental date. The appraiser will then review the appraisee's performance from the date of the stoppage of increments. If the appraisee's performance was still unsatisfactory and failed to make marked improvement, the increment will continue to be suspended. Moreover, the appraisee's increment date will be deferred and they will lose its seniority accordingly .

The appraisee can appeal to officers who are in senior management positions in their bureau or department, the concerned grade management or the Civil Service Bureau if they feel aggrieved about the management's decision regarding their stoppage of increments and the deferment of the increment date:. The number of civil servants who are subjected to stoppage of increment are as follows

Number of civil servants subject to stoppage of increment
| Year | Number of civil servants subject to stoppage of increment |
|---|---|
| 2016 | 8(5) |
| 2017 | 17(7) |
| 2018 | 10(4) |
| 2019 | 9(7) |
| 2020 | 9(2) |

Effect on Promotion Prospect

Civil servants who have reached the maximum pay point of their rank are not subject to stoppage or deferral of increment are still subjected to the yearly performance appraisal for the management to monitor and assess their performance. The records of such appraisals will serve as references in the future for different human resource management functions:. Appraisee's promotion prospect would be affected if they have performed below expectations and standard . The number of civil servants who have reached the maximum pay point of their rant but still subject to yearly performance appraisal are as follows

Number of civil servants who had reached the maximum pay points
| Year (as at April 1) | Number of civil servants who had reached the maximum pay points |
|---|---|
| 2017 | 81 900 |
| 2018 | 76 894 |
| 2019 | 72 745 |
| 2020 | 69 781 |
| 2021 | 68 387 |

Call for improvements

The management may consider other management actions such as posting and training for the civil servants concerned. Counselling, monitoring and offer of assistance will be provided to substandard performers by their order to achieve timely improvements, the above measures will be introduced during the appraisal period, rather than waiting until the year-end appraisal .

No specific statistics on counselling and guidance to substandard performers were recorded as this is part of the daily staff management and will be conducted if necessary .

Removal by administrative procedures

There are well-established procedures to facilitate the removal of civil servants who underperforms persistently.

If civil servants persistently put up substandard work and remain unable to make marked improvements, the Government may compulsorily retire them in the public interest under section 12 of the Public Service (Administration) Order for a specific observation period. The Government can also retire a civil servant without setting an observation period if it considers it in the public interest to do so .

The relevant administrative procedures can be broadly categorised into three phases:

Phase 1: Management action

When an underperforming civil servant is identified, the management concerned must first advise and counsel him or her, and try to help him or her reach the expected standard of performance.

Phase 2: Pre-section 12 action

If the management action in Phase 1 fails, the management will issue a notification letter to the civil servant concerned, giving him or her a forewarning that the management would call for a special appraisal report on him or her. The civil servant will also be warned that the management may invoke a section 12 action on him or her if their work performance continues to be below standard during the observation period. Phase 3: Section 12 action

The case will be transferred and considered by the Civil Service Bureau if the special appraisal report concludes that the performance of the concerned civil servant remains substandard during the observation period.

If the Civil Service Bureau considers there to be adequate evidence to invoke section 12 on the concerned civil servant, it would issue a letter of intent of requiring retirement to him or her. The civil servant concerned will be given the opportunity to submit their case and representations. Upon consideration of all relevant circumstances, the Chief Executive retains the power to require the officer to retire from the Civil Service.

From 2016 to 2020, the Government has instituted pre-12 section action against 19 civil servants. Among these cases, 4 civil servants have substantial improvement in performance hence are no longer required to further proceedings; Among the remaining 15 officers, 6are still under observation period (some are more recent cases), 2 were retired in the public interest due to persistent sub-standard performance without improvement; 7 has left the Civil service after the commencement of phase 3, i.e. section 12 action .

Disciplinary mechanism

There are two types of disciplinary actions in civil service that can be imposed on civil servants by the Bureau or department,

Summary disciplinary action

Summary disciplinary action such as issuing verbal or written warning, may be taken to civil servants who committed minor misconduct. Minor mistadocut includes occasional unpunctuality and breach of government regulations of a monitor nature, after investigation.

Formal disciplinary action Against civil servants who are with (i) repeated minor misconduct; (ii) more serious misconduct such as abusing their official position; wilfully neglecting official instructions or absenting from duty; and (iii) conviction of criminal offence. Bureau or department can send the mentioned cases to the Secretariat on Civil Service Discipline for centralised processing, with penalties ranging from reprimand to dismissal. The accused civil servant reserved the right to cross-examine witnesses and make representation under the principle of 'natural justice' to ensure a fair hearing .

During 2015–2020, an average of 656 disciplinary actions were brought against civil servants every year.. The majority of these proceedings were in the form of moderate warnings, with only 5.5 percent resulting in removal by dismissal and compulsory retirement.. Civil Servants who disagree with the disciplinary rulings can appeal to the Chief Executive or seek judicial review.However, it has been suggested that the present disciplinary mechanism has insufficient deterrent effect on civil servants who committed misconduct.

Moreover, as there was no statutory time limit on the procedures, the disciplinary cases took a very long period of time to conclude . From 2015 to 2020, approximately 25% of disciplinary matters subject to hearings could not be concluded and ended by the Secretariat on Civil Service Discipline within nine months . It took more than a year to conclude the whole procedure for cases in which Civil Servants were convicted with criminal offences that are relatively minor in nature. Due to the tremendous workload and prolonged examination by Bureau or department, the processing period might be as long as three years in extreme cases . Department took more than two years to conclude the investigation and recommend suitable punishment .

4. Results and findings

The results of the appraisal system have been reflected in different survey results and findings from various credible sources.

4.1 Performance Appraisal in a Hong Kong Public Sector Hospital (1994)

According to the survey conducted, among 316 responses, around 90% of respondents noted that competencies were discussed in appraisal interviews; around 50% of respondents believed that the performance planning stage was useful for gaining an understanding of their responsibilities.

Simultaneously, 66% of the respondents considered appraisers' feedback conducive to performance enhancement. It was also noted that appraisees could acquire a better understanding of appraisers' standards and working methods.

4.2 Performance Appraisal for Executive Officers of the HKSAR (2003)

63% of respondents, who are Executive Officers subject to performance appraisals, agreed that their Appraising Officers are familiar with their responsibilities and performance level expected from them.

4.3 Research Office of the Legislative Council Secretariat (2003)

According to the Information Note published by the Research Office, 99% appraisees were given the top three grades of the six-grade scale, giving rise to the public's scepticism about the fairness and accuracy of the grading.

5. Academic views and commentaries

The results of the appraisal system have been commented on by different scholars and credible sources. Some significant comments are listed below in chronological order.

5.1 Lam Woon Kwong, former Secretary for the Civil Service (2000)

In a broadcast on RTHK, he admitted that the appraisal system lacked 'firm discipline' and commented that it was 'nonsense' to rate mediocre civil servants as "very good" and others as "excellent".

5.2 John P. Burns: Government Capacity and the Hong Kong Civil Service (2004)

The book commented that the appraisal system is only serving administrative functions, for example, promotion decisions, which violates the policy goal of using performance appraisal as a "multi-purpose management tool". The book cited a survey conducted in early 1990, delineating that among civil servants in the Government Secretariat, the Housing Department, and the Social Welfare Department, the performance appraisal reports were only relevant to promotion decisions, but not for other decisions regarding postings, transfers, training and manpower planning.

It also commented that the appraisal process is episodic and restricted to staff reports. Spotlighting the experience in the Customs and Excise Department, managers tend to complete the appraisals annually. The Public Service Commission reinforced that delay in completing performance appraisal is common. To illustrate, there was an incident where appraisals of the entire rank were missing for 'several years', creating the situation where appraisals spanning 5 years were completed in one go.

5.3 Anthony B.L. Cheung: Public Administration In Southeast Asia Thailand, Philippines, Malaysia, Hong Kong, And Macao (2016)

The book commented that some performance measures reported by departments were found not to be the key and most meaningful ones that would best indicate the quality, efficiency, and effectiveness of their work. Only 5% of the performance measures are related to efficiency. The accuracy and reliability of the performance measures were questioned.

It was also commented that the reliability of performance information was questionable. For instance, reports about incorrect or misleading performance results and clear definition of performance measures were not always provided.

5.4 Public Service Commission: Annual Report 2021

The Public Service Commission observed that there was inconsistency between the performance ratings and the adverse narrative comments given by reporting officers in the appraisal reports. Whether the reporting officers made candid assessment based on objective observations was doubted.

It was also observed that several appraisal reports were completed by different Appraising Officers during a reporting year. The adherence to the guideline of completing the form by the same officer over the reporting cycle was questioned.

As appraisal cycles are completed annually, there was a notable incident where 2 candidates' substandard performances were not captured in the appraisal reports for the promotion board to review. Since the incident happened after the appraisal cycle, there was no reference to this incident. The Board consequently recommended the substantive promotion of the 2 candidates for the Appointment Authority's endorsement. Attention of the issue was only drawn by the Appointment Authority subsequently.

6. Reforms

In response to the criticisms of the performance appraisal system, some departments experimented with reforms of the old performance appraisal system. In March 1999, according to the Consultative Document published by the Civil Service Bureau, the Bureau noted the need for 'reform of the performance appraisal culture" and "indicative benchmark for grading distribution'. Reforms of the performance appraisal system in some government departments include (i) Creation of Assessment Panels, and (ii) Implementation of a 'Forced Choice' system.

6.1 Assessment Panels

Assessment panels are described as 'a management tool to help departments cross moderate appraisal ratings'. Composed of groups of senior officials, the panels monitor the distribution of grading and handle appeals against performance appraisals. The appraisers would continue to report on the performance of appraisees, while the assessment panels undertake levelling and moderating work among appraisal reports and to identify substandard performers.

By January 2000, 20 departments had established assessment panels for 156 ranks in 62 grades.

6.2 'Forced Choice' System

A 'Forced Choice' or 'indicative benchmarking' system is a system in which officers are divided into categories of fixed percentage. For example, in the Customs and Excise Department, about 15% of officers receive 'outstanding', 75-85% 'very effective' and 'effective', and less than 10% 'moderate' and 'poor'.

6.3 Comments on the reforms

It has been commented that the 'Forced Choice' system does not improve the quality of appraisals. Instead of overgrading the appraisees, some appraisees were downgraded from 'outstanding' to 'very effective' just to fit the guidelines issued on the 'Forced Choice' System. Ultimately, the system had not been widely adopted by the government.

It has been commented by scholars that the use of assessment panels and 'Forced Choice' system have reduced the problem of overgrading to some extent. However, the extent of reform remains to be limited. The Public Service Commission noted in a survey, that only 33% of the ranks surveyed established assessment panels.

The results of the establishment of assessment panels are also doubted by the Public Service Commission. The problem of overgrading was replaced by the adoption of an arithmetic approach where rating was adjusted statistically for meeting a fixed rating distribution framework. Besides, a substantial number of officers were given the same ratings in overall performance and individual competencies, making it difficult to differentiate the comparative merits of officers.

Ultimately, the attempts at reforms have not been successful. It fails to consider the perspective of those other than the appraisers in the appraisal process, and it is not effectively linked to other parts of the performance management system such as training.

== Staff discipline ==
Disciplinary action may be taken against an act of misconduct to achieve a punitive, rehabilitative and deterrent effect.

== Staff relations ==
There is both a central and a departmental staff consultative machinery. Centrally, there are the Senior Civil Service Council, the Model Scale 1 Staff Consultative Council, the Police Force Council, and the Disciplined Services Consultative Council. Through these channels, the Government consults its staff on any major changes, which affect their conditions of service. At the departmental level, there are Departmental Consultative Committees which aim to improve co-operation and understanding between management and staff through regular exchanges of views. There are established channels to deal with staff grievances and complaints. Individual members of staff with problems can receive counselling, advice and help. A Staff Suggestions Scheme is run by both the CSB and departments to encourage staff to make suggestions for improving the efficiency of the civil service. Awards are given to those whose suggestions are found useful. A Staff Welfare Fund caters for the interests of staff. A Staff Relief Fund provides assistance to meet unforeseen financial needs to staff.

== See also ==
- Civil service of the United Kingdom
- Civil Service Bureau
- Government of Hong Kong
- Hong Kong Civil Service cruise perk
