= Organizational structure =

Way in which an organization is structured

An organizational structure defines how activities such as task allocation, coordination, and supervision are directed toward the achievement of organizational aims.

Organizational structure affects organizational action and provides the foundation on which standard operating procedures and routines rest. It determines which individuals get to participate in which decision-making processes, and thus to what extent their views shape the organization's actions. Organizational structure can also be considered as the viewing glass or perspective through which individuals see their organization and its environment.

Organizations are a variant of clustered entities.

An organization can be structured in many different ways, depending on its objectives. The structure of an organization will determine the modes in which it operates and performs. Organizational structure allows the expressed allocation of responsibilities for different functions and processes to different entities such as the branch, department, workgroup, and individual.

Organizations need to be efficient, flexible, innovative and caring in order to achieve a sustainable competitive advantage.

== Types ==
=== Pre-bureaucratic structures ===
Pre-bureaucratic (entrepreneurial) structures lack standardization of tasks. This structure is most common in smaller organizations and is best used to solve simple tasks, such as sales. The structure is totally centralized. The strategic leader makes all key decisions and most communication is done by one on one conversations. It is particularly useful for new (entrepreneurial) business as it enables the founder to control growth and development.

They are usually based on traditional domination or charismatic domination in the sense of Max Weber's tripartite classification of authority.

=== Bureaucratic structures ===
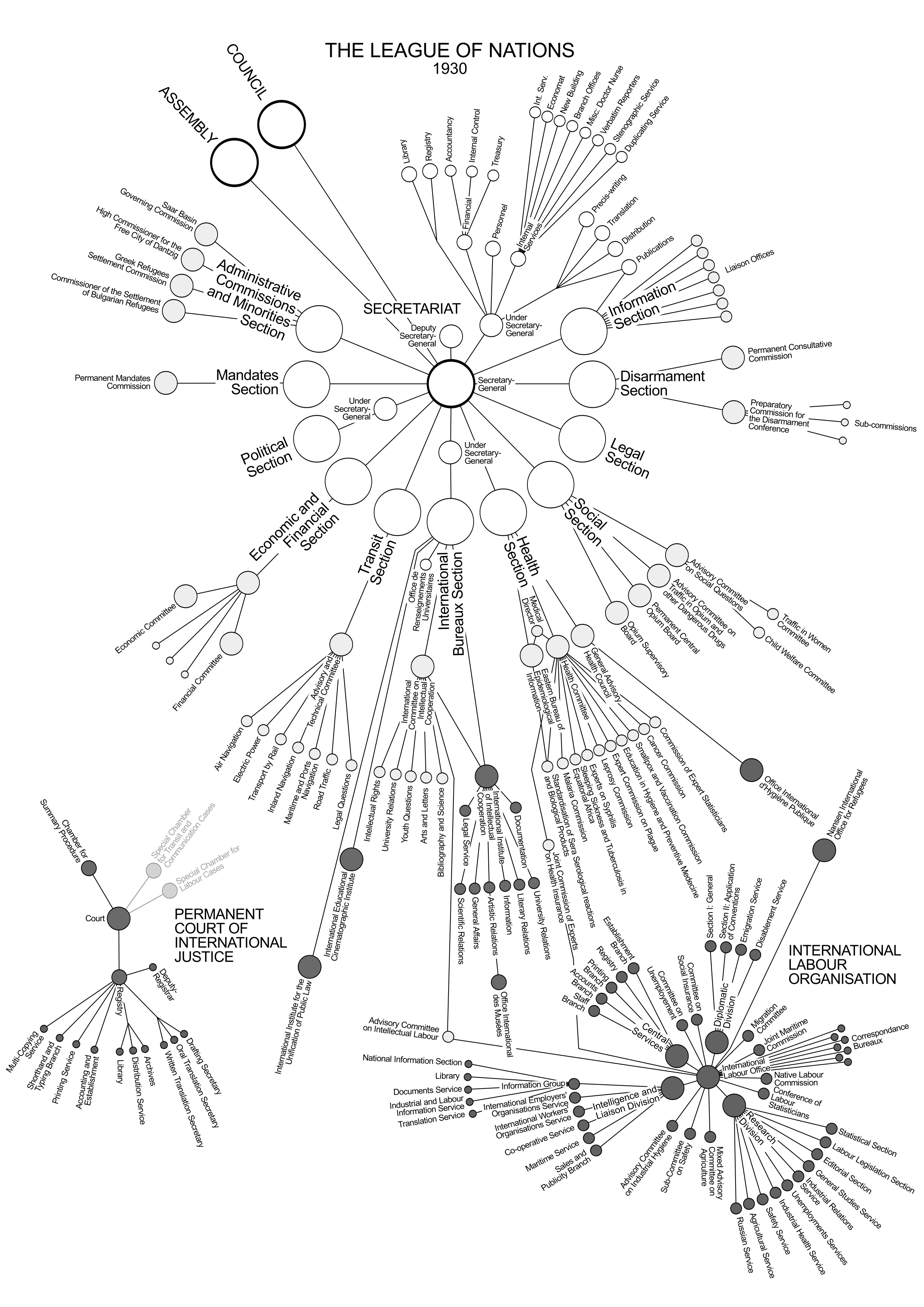
Large international organisation bureaucratic structure: the League of Nations in 1930

Weber (1948, p. 214) gives the analogy that "the fully developed bureaucratic mechanism compares with other organizations exactly as does the machine compare with the non-mechanical modes of production. Precision, speed, unambiguity, … strict subordination, reduction of friction and of material and personal costs- these are raised to the optimum point in the strictly bureaucratic administration." Bureaucratic structures have a certain degree of standardization. They are better suited for more complex or larger scale organizations, usually adopting a tall structure. The tension between bureaucratic structures and non-bureaucratic is echoed in Burns and Stalker's distinction between mechanistic and organic structures.

The Weberian characteristics of bureaucracy are:

- Clear defined roles and responsibilities
- A hierarchical structure
- Respect for merit

Bureaucratic structures have many levels of management ranging from senior executives to regional managers, all the way to department store managers. Since there are many levels, decision-making authority has to pass through more layers than flatter organizations. A bureaucratic organization has rigid and tight procedures, policies and constraints. This kind of structure is reluctant to adapt or change what they have been doing since the company started. Organizational charts exist for every department, and everyone understands who is in charge and what their responsibilities are for every situation. Decisions are made through an organized bureaucratic structures, the authority is at the top and information is then flowed from top to bottom. This causes for more rules and standards for the company which operational process is watched with close supervision. Some advantages for bureaucratic structures for top-level managers are they have a tremendous control over organizational structure decisions. This works best for managers who have a command and control style of managing. Strategic decision-making is also faster because there are fewer people it has to go through to approve. A disadvantage in bureaucratic structures is that it can discourage creativity and innovation in the organization. This can make it hard for a company to adapt to changing conditions in the marketplace.

=== Post-bureaucratic ===
The term of post bureaucratic is used in two senses in the organizational literature: one generic and one much more specific. In the generic sense the term post bureaucratic is often used to describe a range of ideas developed since the 1980s that specifically contrast themselves with Weber's ideal type bureaucracy. This may include total quality management, culture management and matrix management, amongst others. None of these however has left behind the core tenets of Bureaucracy. Hierarchies still exist, authority is still Weber's rational, legal type, and the organization is still rule bound. Heckscher, arguing along these lines, describes them as cleaned up bureaucracies, rather than a fundamental shift away from bureaucracy. Gideon Kunda, in his classic study of culture management at 'Tech' argued that 'the essence of bureaucratic control – the formalization, codification and enforcement of rules and regulations – does not change in principle.....it shifts focus from organizational structure to the organization's culture'.

Another smaller group of theorists have developed the theory of the Post-Bureaucratic Organization, which attempts to describe an organization that is fundamentally not bureaucratic. Charles Heckscher has developed an ideal type, the post-bureaucratic organization, in which decisions are based on dialogue and consensus rather than authority and command, the organization is a network rather than a hierarchy, open at the boundaries (in direct contrast to culture management); there is an emphasis on meta-decision-making rules rather than decision-making rules. This sort of horizontal decision-making by consensus model is often used in housing cooperatives, other cooperatives and when running a non-profit or community organization. It is used in order to encourage participation and help to empower people who normally experience oppression in groups.

Still other theorists are developing a resurgence of interest in complexity theory and organizations, and have focused on how simple structures can be used to engender organizational adaptations. For instance, Miner et al. (2000) studied how simple structures could be used to generate improvisational outcomes in product development. Their study makes links to simple structures and improviser learning. Other scholars such as Jan Rivkin and Sigglekow, and Nelson Repenning revive an older interest in how structure and strategy relate in dynamic environments.

=== Functional structure ===
A functional organizational structure is a structure that consists of activities such as coordination, supervision and task allocation. The organizational structure determines how the organization performs or operates. The term "organizational structure" refers to how the people in an organization are grouped and to whom they report. One traditional way of organizing people is by function. Some common functions within an organization include production, marketing, human resources, and accounting.

This organizing of specialization leads to operational efficiency, where employees become specialists within their own realm of expertise. On the other hand, the most typical problem with a functional organizational structure is that communication within the company can be rather rigid, making the organization slow and inflexible. Therefore, lateral communication between functions becomes very important, so that information is disseminated not only vertically, but also horizontally within the organization. Communication in organizations with functional organizational structures can be rigid because of the standardized ways of operation and the high degree of formalization.

As a whole, a functional organization is best suited as a producer of standardized goods and services at large volume and low cost. Coordination and specialization of tasks are centralized in a functional structure, which makes producing a limited number of products or services efficient and predictable. Moreover, efficiency can further be realized as functional organizations integrate their activities vertically so that products are sold and distributed quickly and at low cost. For instance, a small business could make components used in production of its products instead of buying them.

Even though functional units often perform with a high level of efficiency, their level of cooperation with each other is sometimes compromised. Such groups may have difficulty working well with each other as they may be territorial and unwilling to cooperate. The occurrence of infighting among units may cause delays, reduced commitment due to competing interests, and wasted time, making projects fall behind schedule. This ultimately can bring down production levels overall, and the company-wide employee commitment toward meeting organizational goals.

=== Divisional structure ===
The divisional structure or product structure consists of self-contained divisions. A division is a collection of functions which produce a product. It also utilizes a plan to compete and operate as a separate business or profit center. According to Zainbooks.com, divisional structure in the United States is seen as the second most common structure for organization today.

Employees who are responsible for certain market services or types of products are placed in divisional structure in order to increase their flexibility. Examples of divisions include regional (a U.S. Division and an EU division), consumer type (a division for companies and one for households), and product type (a division for trucks, another for SUVs, and another for cars). The divisions may also have their own departments such as marketing, sales, and engineering.

The advantage of divisional structure is that it uses delegated authority so the performance can be directly measured with each group. This results in managers performing better and high employee morale. Another advantage of using divisional structure is that it is more efficient in coordinating work between different divisions, and there is more flexibility to respond when there is a change in the market. Also, a company will have a simpler process if they need to change the size of the business by either adding or removing divisions. When divisional structure is utilized more specialization can occur within the groups. When divisional structure is organized by product, the customer has their own advantages especially when only a few services or products are offered which differ greatly. When using divisional structures that are organized by either markets or geographic areas they generally have similar functions and are located in different regions or markets. This allows business decisions and activities coordinated locally.

The disadvantages of the divisional structure is that it can support unhealthy rivalries among divisions. This type of structure may increase costs by requiring more qualified managers for each division. Also, there is usually an over-emphasis on divisional more than organizational goals which results in duplication of resources and efforts like staff services, facilities, and personnel.

=== Matrix structure ===
The matrix structure groups employees by both function and product simultaneously. A matrix organization frequently uses teams of employees to accomplish work, in order to take advantage of the strengths, as well as make up for the weaknesses, of functional and decentralized forms. An example would be a company that produces two products, "product A" and "product B". Using the matrix structure, this company would organize functions within the company as follows: "product A" sales department, "product A" customer service department, "product A" accounting, "product B" sales department, "product B" customer service department, "product B" accounting department.

- Weak/functional matrix: A project manager with only limited authority is assigned to oversee the cross- functional aspects of the project. The functional managers maintain control over their resources and project areas.
- Balanced/functional matrix: A project manager is assigned to oversee the project. Power is shared equally between the project manager and the functional managers. It brings the best aspects of functional and projectized organizations. However, this is the most difficult system to maintain as the sharing of power is a delicate proposition.
- Strong/project matrix: A project manager is primarily responsible for the project. Functional managers provide technical expertise and assign resources as needed.

There are advantages and disadvantages of the matrix structure. Some of the disadvantages include tendencies towards anarchy, power struggles and 'sinking' to group and division levels. Matrices increase the complexity of the chain of command, which can present problems because of the differentiation between functional managers and project managers. This, in turn, can be confusing for employees to understand who is next in the chain of command. An additional disadvantage of the matrix structure is higher manager to worker ratio that results in conflicting loyalties of employees. However, the matrix structure also has significant advantages that make it valuable for companies to use. The matrix structure may improve upon the "silo" critique of functional management in that it aims to diminish the vertical structure of functional and create a more horizontal structure which allows the spread of information across task boundaries to happen much quicker. It aims to allow specialization to increase depth of knowledge and allows individuals to be chosen according to project needs.

Starbucks is one of the numerous large organizations that successfully developed the matrix structure supporting their focused strategy. Its design combines functional and product based divisions, with employees reporting to two heads.

Some experts also mention the multinational design, common in global companies, such as Procter & Gamble, Toyota and Unilever. This structure can be seen as a complex form of the matrix, as it maintains coordination among products, functions and geographic areas.

With the growth of the internet, and the associated access that gives all levels of an organization to information and communication via digital means, power structures have begun to align more as a wirearchy, enabling the flow of power and authority to be based not on hierarchical levels, but on information, trust, credibility, and a focus on results.

In general, over the last decade, it has become increasingly clear that through the forces of globalization, competition and more demanding customers, the structure of many companies has become flatter, less hierarchical, more fluid and even virtual.

=== Flat organization ===
The Flat organization is common in small companies (entrepreneurial start-ups, university spin offs). As companies grow they tend to become more complex and hierarchical, which lead to an expanded structure, with more levels and departments.

However, in rare cases, such as the examples of Valve, GitHub, Inc. and 37signals, the organization remains very flat as it grows, eschewing middle managers. (However, GitHub subsequently introduced middle managers). All of the aforementioned organizations operate in the field of technology, which may be significant, as software developers are highly skilled professionals, much like lawyers.

Senior lawyers also enjoy a relatively high degree of autonomy within a typical law firm, which is typically structured as a partnership rather than a hierarchical bureaucracy. Some other types of professional organizations are also commonly structured as partnerships, such as accountancy companies and GP surgeries.

=== Bureaucracy ===
Often, growth would result in bureaucracy, the most prevalent structure in the past. It is still, however, relevant in former Soviet Republics, China, and most governmental organizations all over the world. Shell used to represent the typical bureaucracy: top-heavy and hierarchical. It featured multiple levels of command and duplicate service companies existing in different regions. All this made Shell apprehensive to market changes, leading to its incapacity to grow and develop further. The failure of this structure became the main reason for the company restructuring into a matrix.

=== Team ===
One of the newest organizational structures developed in the 20th century is team and the related concept of team development or team building. In small businesses, the team structure can define the entire organization. Teams can be both horizontal and vertical. While an organization is constituted as a set of people who synergize individual competencies to achieve newer dimensions, the quality of organizational structure revolves around the competencies of teams in totality. The team could classified into functional team structure, lightweight team structure, heavyweight team structure and autonomous team structure. For example, every one of the Whole Foods Market stores, the largest natural-foods grocer in the US developing a focused strategy, is an autonomous profit centre composed of an average of 10 self-managed teams, while team leaders in each store and each region are also a team. Larger bureaucratic organizations can benefit from the flexibility of teams as well. Xerox, Motorola, and DaimlerChrysler are all among the companies that actively use teams to perform tasks.

However, studies shows that this structure may have challenges for an organization. The scattered nature of team-based organizations makes it difficult for them to communicate and share information across borders, where knowledge exchange between and among teams and stakeholders becomes crucial as team-based organizing becomes the norm. However, this can be tackled by concentrate on their internal tasks as well as their relationships and connections with their multiple stakeholders, both inside and external to the firm.

=== Network ===
Another modern structure is network. A network can be described as "long term purposeful arrangements among distinct but related for-profit organizations that allow those firms in them to gain or sustain competitive advantage" where "communication between people of different ranks tends to resemble later consultation rather than vertical command". Network organizations lack the hierarchical aspects of other structures and are characterized by clusters of interconnected teams and individuals that come together to form unique teams and complete certain projects or achieve common goals. Participating agents are constrained by their specialization and role within the organization, but their influence varies with the development and dissolution of the projects and teams. For example, although an organization may have separate sales and marketing teams which each operate independently, certain projects will require individuals from those teams to work together and form partnerships for the length of their duration.

This extends out to businesses on a larger scale, where instead of teams within an organization, the network consists of organizations within a market. While business giants risk becoming too clumsy to proact (such as), act and react efficiently, a network organization can contract out any business function that can be done better or more cheaply. In essence, these types of network structures' managers spend most of their time coordinating and controlling external relations, usually by electronic means.

H&M is outsourcing its clothing to a network of 700 suppliers, more than two-thirds of which are based in low-cost Asian countries. Not owning any factories, H&M can be more flexible than many other retailers in lowering its costs, which aligns with its low-cost strategy.

==== Advantages ====
The potential management opportunities offered by recent advances in complex networks theory have been demonstrated including applications to product design and development, and innovation problem in markets and industries. For these benefits to be realised, the network structure relies on trust through shared values and norms, actively avoiding hold-up problems and opportunism risks. By eliminating the uncertainty that one agent will use any potential gain in bargaining power for their singular gain, a network structure can avoid the associated inefficiencies that would arise.

==== Disadvantages ====
However, the potential disadvantages for enterprises adopting the networked organizational structure include unreasonable design, insufficient supervision and poor linkage ability. If the different relations required for the network structure contrast too greatly it may lead to confusion, delays, and unnecessary increases in complexity. Due to the network structure relying on many different individuals or teams working together independently, effective supervision is needed to avoid shirking or free riding. Similarly, some individuals and teams coordinate poorly, resulting in communication breakdowns and misunderstanding, which only hinders the progression of tasks.

=== Virtual ===
Virtual organization is defined as being closely coupled upstream with its suppliers and downstream with its customers such that where one begins and the other ends means little to those who manage the business processes within the entire organization. A special form of boundaryless organization is virtual. Hedberg, Dahlgren, Hansson, and Olve (1999) consider the virtual organization as not physically existing as such, but enabled by software to exist. The virtual organization exists within a network of alliances, using the Internet. This means while the core of the organization can be small but still the company can operate globally be a market leader in its niche. According to Anderson, because of the unlimited shelf space of the Web, the cost of reaching niche goods is falling dramatically. Although none sell in huge numbers, there are so many niche products that collectively they make a significant profit, and that is what made highly innovative Amazon.com so successful.

=== Hierarchy-community phenotype model ===
Hierarchy-Community Phenotype Model of Organizational Structure

In the 21st century, even though most, if not all, organizations are not of a pure hierarchical structure, many managers are still blind to the existence of the flat community structure within their organizations.

The business is not always just a place where people come to work. For some employees, the firm may confer on them a sense of belonging and identity –– the firm can become their "village", their community. The firm of the 21st century isn't restricted to being a hierarchy which strives for maximum efficiency and profit; it may also become a community where people feel they belong and can mutually grow, where their affective and innovative needs are met.

Lim, Griffiths, and Sambrook (2010) developed the Hierarchy-Community Phenotype Model of Organizational Structure borrowing from the concept of Phenotype from genetics. "A phenotype refers to the observable characteristics of an organism. It results from the expression of an organism's genes and the influence of the environment. The expression of an organism's genes is usually determined by pairs of alleles. Alleles are different forms of a gene. In our model, each employee's formal, hierarchical participation and informal, community participation within the organization, as influenced by his or her environment, contributes to the overall observable characteristics (phenotype) of the organization. In other words, just as all the pair of alleles within the genetic material of an organism determines the physical characteristics of the organism, the combined expressions of all the employees' formal hierarchical and informal community participation within an organization give rise to the organizational structure. Due to the vast potentially different combination of the employees' formal hierarchical and informal community participation, each organization is therefore a unique phenotype along a spectrum between a pure hierarchy and a pure community (flat) organizational structure."

"The Hierarchy-Community Phenotype Model of Organisational Structure views an organisation as having both a hierarchy and a community structure, both equally well established and occurring extensively throughout the organisation. On the practical level, it utilises the organizational chart to study the hierarchical structure which brings across individuals' roles and formal authority within their designated space at the workplace, and social network analysis to map out the community structure within the organisation, identifying individuals' informal influences which usually do not respect workplace boundaries and at many times extend beyond the workplace."

See also informal organization

== History ==
Organizational structures developed from the ancient times of hunters and collectors in tribal organizations through highly royal and clerical power structures to industrial structures and today's post-industrial structures.

As pointed out by Lawrence B. Mohr, the early theorists of organizational structure, Taylor, Fayol, and Weber "saw the importance of structure for effectiveness and efficiency and assumed without the slightest question that whatever structure was needed, people could fashion accordingly. Organizational structure was considered a matter of choice... When in the 1930s, the rebellion began that came to be known as human relations theory, there was still not a denial of the idea of structure as an artifact, but rather an advocacy of the creation of a different sort of structure, one in which the needs, knowledge, and opinions of employees might be given greater recognition." However, a different view arose in the 1960s, suggesting that the organizational structure is "an externally caused phenomenon, an outcome rather than an artifact."

In the 21st century, organizational theorists such as Lim, Griffiths, and Sambrook (2010) are once again proposing that organizational structure development is very much dependent on the expression of the strategies and behavior of the management and the workers as constrained by the power distribution between them, and influenced by their environment and the outcome.

== Military command and control ==
There are correspondences between Mintzberg's organizational archetypes and various approaches to military Command and Control (C2). Mintzberg's Machine Bureaucracy represents a highly centralized approach to C2, with a narrow allocation of decision rights, restricted patterns of interaction among organization members, and a restricted flow of information. Mintzberg's Adhocracy, on the other hand, represents a more networked and less centralized approach to C2, with more individual initiative and self-synchronization. It involves a broader allocation of decision rights, broader interaction patterns, and broader information distribution. Mintzberg's other organization types (for example, the Professional Bureaucracy and the Simple Structure) fall in between these two.

Moreover, Walker et al. states the event analysis for systematic teamwork (EAST) method as one of the military command and control approach provides a means of describing emergent system-level features that result from the intricate interactions of system constituents (human and technical). They are modelled using task, social, and propositional networks and presented using an integrated methodologies approach. The social and technical principle of function and approximation, which states that similar individuals and the same technology may achieve the same objective via entirely distinct paths and entirely different starting points, is one important aspect of EAST. In addition, desirable emergent features, such as systems level "shared awareness", pace, agility, and self-synchronization might appear due to the indisputable reality that humans may adjust to the techno-organisational aspects of a particular system.

== Operational and informal ==
The set organizational structure may not coincide with facts, evolving in operational action. Such divergence decreases performance, when growing as a wrong organizational structure may hamper cooperation and thus hinder the completion of orders in due time and within limits of resources and budgets. Further, the informal organization, which is the structure of social interactions that emerges within organizations, may be subject to restrictions also tends to lag in its integration into the newly established formal organisation, whereas formal organization or the subjective norms system created by managers can be changed relatively quickly.

Organizational structures should be adaptive to process requirements, aiming to optimize the ratio of effort and input to output.

== Configurations of organizational structure according to Mintzberg ==
Diagram, proposed by Henry Mintzberg, showing the main parts of organisation, including technostructure

=== Parts of organization ===
Henry Mintzberg considers five main parts of organization:

- Strategic apex (leaders of organization)
- Middle line (managers of lower level)
- Operating core (workers of lowest level, directly producing something or providing services)
- Technostructure (analysts)
- Support staff (helping other members of organisation to perform their function)

An additional element is organisational ideology.

=== Mechanisms of coordination ===
Mintzberg considers six main mechanisms of coordination of work:

- Mutual adjustment (without formal, standardized mechanisms)
- Direct supervision (when one person, leader of organization, gives direct orders to others)
- Standardization of work processes (based on the documents that regulate work and are produced by technostructure)
- Standardization of outputs (only the results of work are regulated)
- Standardization of skills (based on preparing the specialists outside the organization)
- Standardization of norms (based on organisation's values, ideology)

=== Configurations of organizations ===
Mintzberg considers seven main configurations of organizational structure:

1. Entrepreneurial organization (strategic apex, direct supervision dominate)
2. Machine organization (technostructure, standardization of work processes dominate)
3. Professional organization (operating core, standardization of skills dominate)
4. Diversified organization (middle level, standardization of outputs dominate)
5. Innovative organization (support staff, mutual adjustment dominate)
6. Missionary organization (ideology, standardization of norms dominate)
7. Political organization (no part or mechanism of coordination dominates)

Entrepreneurial organisation or Simple structure has simple, informal structure. Its leader coordinates the work using direct supervision. There is no technostructure, little support staff. Such structure is usually found in organizations with environment that is simple (so that one man could have significant influence), but changing (so that flexibility of one man would give a significant advantage over the bureaucratic structures).

Machine organisation or Machine bureaucracy has formal rules regulating the work, developed technostructure and middle line, is centralised, hierarchical. Such structure is common when the work is simple and repetitive. Organizations also tend to achieve such structure when they are strongly controlled from outside. Also, such structure is common for organizations that perform work that is related to some sort of control (for example, prisons, police), or organizations with special safety requirements (for example, fire departments, airlines).

Professional configuration or Professional bureaucracy mostly coordinates the work of members of operating core, professionals, through their training (for example, in university). Operating core in such organisation is large, middle line insignificant, as the professionals perform complex work and have significant autonomy. Technostructure is also insignificant. Support staff, helping the professionals to do their job, is numerous. Professionals participate in administrative work, thus there are many committees. Such structure is common for universities, hospitals, law firms.

Diversified Configuration or Divisionalized form consists of several parts having high autonomy. Such structure is common for old, large organizations.

Innovative Configuration or Adhocracy gathers the specialists of different fields into teams for specific tasks. Such organizations are common when environment is complex and dynamic. Mintzberg considers two types of such organization: operating adhocracy and administrative adhocracy. Operating adhocracy solves innovative problems for its clients. Examples of such organisation can be advertising agency or firm that develops the prototypes of products. Administrative adhocracy has teams solving problems for the organization itself. As an example of such organization Mintzberg gives NASA when it worked on Apollo program.

Missionary organisation coordinates the work through organisational ideology. Formal rules in such organization are not numerous. Such organizations are decentralized, the differences between levels are not significant.

Political configuration happens when the power is mostly used through workplace politics.

== See also ==
- Corporate governance
- Corporation
- Industrial and organizational psychology
- Dynamic governance
- Management
- Organizational architecture
- Organizational behavior
- Organizational learning
- Organizational culture
- Organization development
- Organizational psychology
- Parent company
- Value network
- Viable system theory
- Organizational Cybernetics
- Connectivity Integrator

== Bibliography ==
- Lawrence B. Mohr, Explaining Organizational Behavior. The Limits and Possibilities of Theory and Research., Jossey-Bass Publishers, 1982.
