= Hierarchical organization =

Type of organizational structure

A hierarchical organization or hierarchical organisation (see spelling differences) is an organizational structure where every entity in the organization, except one, is subordinate to a single other entity. This arrangement is a form of hierarchy. In an organization, this hierarchy usually consists of a singular/group of power at the top with subsequent levels of power beneath them. This is the dominant mode of organization among large organizations; most corporations, governments, criminal enterprises, and organized religions are hierarchical organizations with different levels of management power or authority. For example, the broad, top-level overview of the hierarchy of the Catholic Church consists of the Pope, then the Cardinals, then the Archbishops, and so on. Another example is the hierarchy between the four castes in the Hindu caste system, which arises from the religious belief "that each is derived from a different part of the creator God’s (Brahma) body, descending from the head downwards."

Members of hierarchical organizational structures mainly communicate with their immediate superior and their immediate subordinates. Structuring organizations in this way is useful, partly because it reduces the communication overhead costs by limiting information flows.

== Visualization ==
A hierarchy is typically visualized as a pyramid, where the height of the ranking or person depicts their power status and the width of that level represents how many people or business divisions are at that level relative to the whole—the highest-ranking people are at the apex, and there are very few of them, and in many cases only one; the base may include thousands of people who have no subordinates. These hierarchies are typically depicted with a tree or triangle diagram, creating an organizational chart or organogram. Those nearest the top have more power than those nearest the bottom, and there being fewer people at the top than at the bottom. As a result, superiors in a hierarchy generally have higher status and obtain higher salaries and other rewards than their subordinates.

Although the image of organizational hierarchy as a pyramid is widely used, strictly speaking such a pyramid (or organizational chart as its representation) draws on two mechanisms: hierarchy and division of labour. As such, a hierarchy can, for example, also entail a boss with a single employee. When such a simple hierarchy grows by subordinates specialising (e.g. in production, sales, and accounting) and subsequently also establishing and supervising their own (e.g. production, sales, accounting) departments, the typical pyramid arises. This specialisation process is called division of labour.

== Common social manifestations ==
Governmental organizations and most companies feature similar hierarchical structures. Traditionally, the monarch stood at the pinnacle of the state. In many countries, feudalism and manorialism provided a formal social structure that established hierarchical links pervading every level of society, with the monarch at the top.

In modern post-feudal states the nominal top of the hierarchy still remains a head of state – sometimes a president or a constitutional monarch, although in many modern states the powers of the head of state are delegated among different bodies. Below or alongside this head there is commonly a senate, parliament or congress; such bodies in turn often delegate the day-to-day running of the country to a prime minister, who may head a cabinet. In many democracies, constitutions theoretically regard "the people" as the notional top of the hierarchy, above the head of state; in reality, the people's influence is often restricted to voting in elections or referendums.

In business, the business owner traditionally occupies the pinnacle of the organization. Most modern large companies lack a single dominant shareholder and for most purposes delegate the collective power of the business owners to a board of directors, which in turn delegates the day-to-day running of the company to a managing director or CEO. Again, although the shareholders of the company nominally rank at the top of the hierarchy, in reality many companies are run at least in part as personal fiefdoms by their management. Corporate governance rules attempt to mitigate this tendency.

== Origins and development of social hierarchical organization ==
Smaller and more informal social units – families, bands, tribes, special interest groups – which may form spontaneously, have little need for complex hierarchies – or indeed for any hierarchies. They may rely on self-organizing tendencies. A conventional view ascribes the growth of hierarchical social habits and structures to increased complexity; the religious syncretism and issues of tax-gathering in expanding empires played a role here.

However, others have observed that simple forms of hierarchical leadership naturally emerge from interactions in both human and non-human primate communities. For instance, this occurs when a few individuals obtain more status in their tribe, (extended) family or clan, or when competences and resources are unequally distributed across individuals.

== Studies ==
The organizational development theorist Elliott Jaques identified a special role for hierarchy in his concept of requisite organization.

The iron law of oligarchy, introduced by Robert Michels, describes the inevitable tendency of hierarchical organizations to become oligarchic in their decision making.

The Peter Principle is a term coined by Laurence J. Peter in which the selection of a candidate for a position in an hierarchical organization is based on the candidate's performance in their current role, rather than on abilities relevant to the intended role. Thus, employees only stop being promoted once they can no longer perform effectively, and managers in an hierarchical organization "rise to the level of their incompetence."

Hierarchiology is another term coined by Laurence J. Peter, described in his humorous book of the same name, to refer to the study of hierarchical organizations and the behavior of their members.

Having formulated the Principle, I discovered that I had inadvertently founded a new science, hierarchiology, the study of hierarchies. The term hierarchy was originally used to describe the system of church government by priests graded into ranks. The contemporary meaning includes any organization whose members or employees are arranged in order of rank, grade or class. Hierarchiology, although a relatively recent discipline, appears to have great applicability to the fields of public and private administration.

— Laurence J. Peter and Raymond Hull, The Peter Principle: Why Things Always Go Wrong

David Andrews' book The IRG Solution: Hierarchical Incompetence and how to Overcome it argued that hierarchies were inherently incompetent, and were only able to function due to large amounts of informal lateral communication fostered by private informal networks.

== Types of hierarchy ==
Hierarchical organization is a phenomenon with many faces. To understand and map this diversity, various typologies have been developed. Formal versus informal hierarchy is a well-known typology, but one can also distinguish four hierarchy types.

=== Two types of hierarchy: Formal and informal ===
A well-known distinction is between formal and informal hierarchy in organizational settings. According to Max Weber, the formal hierarchy is the vertical sequence of official positions within one explicit organizational structure, whereby each position or office is under the control and supervision of a higher one. The formal hierarchy can thus be defined as "an official system of unequal person-independent roles and positions which are linked via lines of top-down command-and-control." By contrast, an informal hierarchy can be defined as person-dependent social relationships of dominance and subordination, emerging from social interaction and becoming persistent over time through repeated social processes. The informal hierarchy between two or more people can be based on difference in, for example, seniority, experience or social status. The formal and informal hierarchy may complement each other in any specific organization and therefore tend to co-exist in any organization. But the general pattern observed in many organizations is that when the formal hierarchy decreases (over time), the informal hierarchy increases, or vice versa.

=== Four types of hierarchy ===
A more elaborate typology of hierarchy in social systems entails four types: hierarchy as a ladder of formal authority, ladder of achieved status, self-organized ladder of responsibility, and an ideology-based ladder. The first two types can be equated with the formal and informal hierarchy, as previously defined. Accordingly, this typology extends the formal and informal hierarchy with two other types.

==== Hierarchy as ladder of formal authority ====
This type of hierarchy is defined as a sequence of levels of formal authority, that is, the authority to make decisions. This results in a ladder that systematically differentiates the authority to make decisions. A typical authority-based hierarchy in companies is: the board of directors, CEO, departmental managers, team leaders, and other employees. The authority-based hierarchy, also known as the formal hierarchy, to a large extent arises from the legal structure of the organization: for example, the owner of the firm is also the CEO or appoints the CEO, who in turn appoints and supervises departmental managers, and so forth.

==== Hierarchy as ladder of achieved status ====
Also known as the informal hierarchy (defined earlier), this type of hierarchy draws on unofficial mechanisms for ranking people. It involves differences in status, other than those arising from formal authority. Status is one's social standing or professional position, relative to those of others. In anthropology and sociology, this notion of status is also known as achieved status, the social position that is earned instead of being ascribed. The underlying mechanism is social stratification, which draws on shared cultural beliefs (e.g. regarding expertise and seniority as drivers of status) that can make status differences between people appear natural and fair. A ladder of achieved status is socially constructed, which makes it fundamentally different from the ladder of authority that (largely) arises from an underlying legal structure. The social-constructivist nature of status also implies that ladders of achieved status especially arise in groups of people that frequently interact—for example, a work unit, team, family, or neighbourhood.

==== Hierarchy as self-organized ladder of responsibility ====
In the literature on organization design and agility, hierarchy is conceived as a requisite structure that emerges in a self-organized manner from operational activities. For example, a small firm composed of only three equivalent partners can initially operate without any hierarchy; but substantial growth in terms of people and their tasks will create the need for coordination and related managerial activities; this implies, for example, that one of the partners starts doing these coordination activities. Another example involves organizations adopting holacracy or sociocracy, with people at all levels self-organizing their responsibilities; that is, they exercise "real" rather than formal authority. In this respect, responsibility is an expression of self-restraint and intrinsic obligation. Examples of self-organized ladders of responsibility have also been observed in (the early stages of) worker cooperatives, like Mondragon, in which hierarchy is created in a bottom-up manner.

==== Hierarchy as ladder of ideology ====
In a hierarchy driven by ideology, people establish themselves as legitimate leaders by invoking some (e.g., religious, spiritual or political) idea to justify the hierarchical relationship between higher and lower levels. Ideological hierarchies have a long history, for example in the administrative hierarchies headed by pharaohs in ancient Egypt or those headed by kings in medieval Europe. The main legitimacy of any pharaoh or king arose from the strong belief in the idea that the pharaoh/king acts as the intermediary between the gods and the people, and thus deputizes for the gods. Another example is the hierarchy prevailing until today in the Balinese community, which is strongly connected to the rice cycle that is believed to constitute a hierarchical relationship between gods and humans, both of whom must play their parts to secure a good crop; the same ideology also legitimizes the hierarchical relationship between high and low castes in Bali. Ideological ladders have also long sustained the way the Catholic church and the Hindu caste system operates. Hierarchies of ideology also exist in many other settings, for instance, those driven by prevailing values and beliefs about how the (e.g. business) world should operate. An example is the ideology of "maximizing shareholder value", which is widely used in publicly traded companies. This ideology helps in creating and sustaining the image of a clear hierarchy from shareholders to employees—although, in practice, the separation of legal ownership and actual control implies that the CEO together with the Board of Directors are at the top of the corporate hierarchy. Given that public corporations (primarily) thrive on ladders of authority; this example also demonstrates how ladders of authority and ideology can complement and reinforce each other.

== Criticism and alternatives ==
The work of diverse theorists such as William James (1842–1910), Michel Foucault (1926–1984) and Hayden White (1928–2018) makes important critiques of hierarchical epistemology. James famously asserts in his work on radical empiricism that clear distinctions of type and category are a constant but unwritten goal of scientific reasoning, so that when they are discovered, success is declared. But if aspects of the world are organized differently, involving inherent and intractable ambiguities, then scientific questions are often considered unresolved. A hesitation to declare success upon the discovery of ambiguities leaves heterarchy at an artificial and subjective disadvantage in the scope of human knowledge. This bias is an artifact of an aesthetic or pedagogical preference for hierarchy, and not necessarily an expression of objective observation.

Hierarchies and hierarchical thinking have been criticized by many people, including Susan McClary (born 1946), and by one political philosophy which vehemently opposes hierarchical organization: anarchism. Heterarchy, the most commonly proposed alternative to hierarchy, has been combined with responsible autonomy by Gerard Fairtlough in his work on triarchy theory. The most beneficial aspect of a hierarchical organization is the clear command-structure that it establishes. However, hierarchy may become dismantled by abuse of power.

Matrix organizations became a trend (or management fad) in the second half of the 20th century.

Amidst constant innovation in information and communication technologies, hierarchical authority structures are giving way to greater decision-making latitude for individuals and more flexible definitions of job activities; and this new style of work presents a challenge to existing organizational forms, with some research studies contrasting traditional organizational forms with groups that operate as online communities that are characterized by personal motivation and the satisfaction of making one's own decisions. When all levels of a hierarchical organization have access to information and communication via digital means, power structures may align more as a wirearchy, enabling the flow of power and authority to be based not on hierarchical levels, but on information, trust, credibility, and a focus on results.

== See also ==
- Anarchism
- Authoritarianism
- Hierarchical ecology (life systems organization)
- Command hierarchy
- Corporate governance
- Flat organization
- Matrix management
- The Nature of the Firm
- Reverse hierarchy
- Social hierarchy
- Wirearchy
