= Wirearchy =

Wirearchy is the power structure created as the Information Age unfolded, disrupting hierarchical organizations and the fundamental construct of access to knowledge. In earlier eras, when information was scarce and access to information was power, organizations structured themselves along chains of power and authority, with those higher in the organization having more knowledge and therefore more power. These structures disintegrated as the Internet made a huge spectrum of information and knowledge freely available.

The term wirearchy was coined in 1999 by Jon Husband, who defined it as "a dynamic flow of power and authority, based on information, trust, credibility, and a focus on results, enabled by interconnected technology and people". Hugh MacLeod illustrated the basic concept of wirearchy by showing links emanating from the classic hierarchical pyramid.

== History ==
Power structures related to knowledge and information date back to early tribal systems, in which the tribal head was noted as the holder and keeper of knowledge. As tribes evolved into cities and countries, power evolved as well, into the hierarchical pyramid. Medieval churches and feudal kingdoms continued this arrangement of scarce knowledge and control of information at the top. Even with the arrival of the printing press and the resulting increase in the ease, speed, and affordability of disseminating information, the spread of knowledge remained relatively slow for centuries, and the hierarchical structure continued to thrive.

The flow of knowledge began to radically accelerate in the 1990s with the emergence of the Internet. Members of many organizations began to connect and share with others through hyperlinks, social media, and easy self-publishing platforms. The availability of these tools led to increased social interaction around knowledge. Traditional hierarchies assumed that leaders higher in the system had better information for making decisions, and that it was in the followers' interest to allow them to make the decisions. The Internet and the ability of organizational members to connect with anyone both inside and outside the organization—and to find information both inside and outside the organization—disrupted this traditional notion of power. Power and authority came to be based less on hierarchical position and more on knowledge sharing, trust, credibility, and end results. The New York Times columnist Thomas Friedman wrote in his book The World Is Flat that the web allowed individuals to be global players in much the same way that company structures of the 1800s and political structures of the Renaissance did.

== Consequences ==
As a design principle, wirearchy means that information flows differently in networked organizations than in traditional hierarchical structures. Knowledge in a networked context flows horizontally, based on connections and collaborations, rather than in official up-and-down streams. Problems that involve formal meetings and memorandums in hierarchical organizations can instead be solved, for example, with a tweet, blog post, or web conference.

In the past decade, the web has become more open, social, and participatory. Project work, analysis and planning, research and development, and other knowledge-intensive work has shifted from formal face-to-face settings to an array of web-based wikis, blogs, RSS feeds, and social networking. This, David Weinberger wrote in his book Everything Is Miscellaneous, allows socially networked work groups to "co-create" knowledge with an ease not possible in a traditional hierarchy. Massive open online courses (MOOCs) and maker fairs are examples of this new organizational model.

In "The Internet of People for a Post-Oil World", Rob van Kranenburg and Christian Nold posit that the rise of the "Internet of Things", coupled with distributed workers, will disrupt the current business models for commercializing technologies and developing products, and that the lines between issues, people, and technology will continue to blur.

Tom Austin, a vice president at the market research firm Gartner, said in a press release in 2010:

Work will become less routine, characterized by increased volatility, hyperconnectedness, "swarming" and more. By 2015, 40 percent or more of an organization's work will be "non-routine", up from 25 percent in 2010. People will swarm more often and work solo less. They'll work with others with whom they have few links, and teams will include people outside the control of the organization. In addition, simulation, visualization and unification technologies, working across yottabytes of data per second, will demand an emphasis on new perceptual skills.

The concept of wirearchy holds that the Internet and its associated networks are moving the world away from the "master-servant" archetype of the Industrial Age to a more open, social, and collaborative relationship, forcing leaders to consider the scope and reach of interconnected markets and flows of information.
