= Functional organization =

Organizational structure

Functional organization is a type of organizational structure that uses the principle of specialization based on function or role.

It allows decisions to be decentralized since issues are delegated to specialized persons or units, leaving them the responsibility of implementing, evaluating, or controlling the given procedures or goals.

== See also ==
- Departmentalization
- Organization design
