= Flat organization =

Organizational structure

A flat organization (or horizontal organization) is an organizational structure with few levels of management between staff and executives. An organizational structure refers to the nature of the distribution of the units and positions within it, and also to the nature of the relationships among those units and positions. Tall and flat organizations differ based on how many levels of management are present in the organization and how much control managers are endowed with.

Transforming a highly hierarchical organization into a flat organization is known as delayering.

== Organizational structure ==
In flat organizations, the number of people directly supervised by each manager is large, and the number of people in the chain of command above each person is small. A manager in a flat organization possesses more responsibility than a manager in a tall organization because there is a greater number of individuals immediately below them who are dependent on direction, help, and support. Moreover, managers in a flat organization rely less on guidance from superiors because the number of superiors above the manager is limited.

== Benefits ==
Empirical evidence from Ghiselli and Johnson suggests that the amount of independence that managers in flat organizations possess as a result of the flat organizational structure satisfies many of their needs in terms of autonomy and self-realization. The idea behind flat organizations is that well-trained workers will be more productive when they are more directly involved in the decision-making process rather than closely supervised by many layers of management. Delayering plans may aim to secure these benefits, although potential risks include undermining employee's confidence in their managers and putting the remaining managers under greater pressure.

This structure is generally possible only in smaller organizations or individual units within larger organizations. Having reached a critical size, organizations can retain a streamlined structure but cannot keep a completely flat manager-to-staff relationship without affecting productivity. Certain financial responsibilities may also require a more conventional structure. A company would not have to give a raise or promotion, based on service length but on greater productivity. Also eliminating certain departments from the payroll means saving money.

The flat organization model promotes employee involvement through decentralized decision-making processes. By elevating the level of responsibility of baseline employees and eliminating layers of middle management, comments and feedback reach all personnel involved in decisions more quickly. Expected response to customer feedback becomes more rapid.

Australian researchers Dunford, Bramble and Littler note that delayering in an organisation may also lead to down-sizing: "[a]lthough delayering need not involve down-sizing - because it is possible to redefine the position of existing staff within the new flatter structure - the two often coincide".

Frank Ostroff, in The Horizontal Organisation, argues that the horizontal structure "delivers value to customers".

== Self-managing teams ==
A "strong form" of flat organization is an organization with no middle management at all. Many small businesses may lack middle managers because there are too few staff to justify hiring middle managers; in this type of organization, the business owner or the CEO may perform some of the functions performed by middle managers in larger organizations.

However, some organizations do not take on middle managers even as they become larger, remaining extremely flat.

An organization with self-managing teams who organize their own work without the need for a middle manager or supervisor above the team may meet or closely approximate this model. While a manager in self-managing teams determines the overall purpose or goal of the team, the team is at liberty to manage the methods by which to achieve that goal. This can cause conflict with people whose career path expectations include a promotion, which may not be available within the organization due to its flat structure. However, alternative "horizontal" career paths may be available, such as developing greater expertise in a role or mastery of a craft, and/or receiving pay raises for loyalty.

An absence of middle managers does not preclude the adoption and retention of mandatory work procedures, including quality assurance procedures. However, due to the fact that significant responsibilities are given to the team members themselves, if a team collectively arrives at the view that the procedures it is following are outdated, or could be improved, it may be able to change them. Such changes may, in some cases, require the approval of executive management and/or customers (consider, for example, a digital agency producing bespoke websites for corporate clients). If executive management is not involved in the decision, or merely rubber-stamps it, this might be an example of consensus decision-making or workplace democracy at the level of a team - or group of teams, if multiple teams are involved in the decision.

The foremost example of a company with self-managing teams is Valve, which also has rotating, not permanent, team leaders - which Valve terms "group contributors", in recognition of the fact that contributing individually and leading at Valve form a spectrum, not a binary dichotomy. Generally the term of a group contributor at Valve is at most one project, after which time they (voluntarily) rotate back to being an individual contributor. Valve also allows team members to work on whatever they find interesting. This is known as open allocation, and means that employees can switch to another team at any time, no questions asked; all desks are on wheels to make this easy. However, because new ideas may require significant resources, someone with a new idea may need to persuade a number of their coworkers to join them in order to create a new team and reach the necessary "critical mass" for the new idea to come to fruition.

Valve's co-founder has admitted that it has issues with failing to catch bad decisions early on due to a lack of internal controls, due to its lack of managers. Prof. Cliff Oswick from Cass Business School, who has studied Valve and other examples of "non-leadership", believes that Valve works because it hires high-calibre people who are a good fit for the leaderless environment, and because it was founded as a flat organization from the outset, so that new hires always knew what they were getting into. However, he warns that the peer-review-based stack ranking system Valve uses for determining employee remuneration, might become problematic if in the future Valve becomes short of cash.

Other examples of companies with self-managing teams include the following:

- Qamcom Research and Technology, a Swedish specialist company with 125 employees, is active in the area of communication, radar and automotive systems.
- Reaktor, a Finnish software and design consultancy with 400 employees, has a flat hierarchy with self-managing teams. Financial figures are shared with all employees monthly.
- 37Signals, an American web software company, has rotating, not permanent, team leaders.
- GitHub, an American software development platform, uses open allocation. However, in response to allegations of harassment, GitHub introduced a layer of middle management in 2014.
- Treehouse, an online technology school, uses open allocation.
- The Morning Star Company, an American agribusiness, has no supervising managers, no employee titles, and peer-based compensation.
- Marc Rich + Co. (now part of Glencore), a commodities trading company, utilized a flat management structure.
- Bayer, a German pharmaceutical and biotech company with over 100,000 employees, cut down on middle management and rewrote its lengthy corporate handbook in favor of self-organization in 2024.

=== Related business concepts ===
In technology, agile development involves teams self-managing to a large extent (though agile development is commonly still practiced within a hierarchical organization, which means that certain types of decisions such as hiring, firing, and pay raises remain the prerogative of managers). In scrum, an agile framework, team members assign work to be done among themselves, either by free choice or by consensus. The scrum master role in scrum is not a management role as such, but is a role that involves helping remove obstacles to progress and ensuring that the basic scrum framework is adhered to by all parties, inside and outside the team - both aspects of the role being more akin to facilitation than to top-down micromanagement. Agile frameworks such as scrum have also begun being used in non-technology companies and organizations.

== Criticisms ==
Mark Henricks, a business journalist and a critic of flat organization, argues that "when you have too little hierarchy, decisions don't get made or are made wrongly by employees who lack experience, accountability, or motivation to do the work of the missing managers".

== See also ==
- Anarchy vs. hierarchy
- Co-operative, in which organizational ownership is highly decentralised. Some co-operatives use flat organization, but some do not.
- Great flattening
- Holacracy
- Hierarchical organization – a highly hierarchical organization is the opposite of a flat organization
- Open plan offices
- Sociocracy (dynamic governance)
- Workplace democracy
- Workers' self-management
