= Matrix management =

Organizational structure

A matrix organization

Matrix management is an organizational structure in which some individuals report to more than one supervisor or leader. Employees may report to a supervisor or leader via a solid line or a dotted line. More broadly, it may also describe the management of cross-functional, cross-business groups and other work models that do not maintain strict vertical business units or silos grouped by function and geography.

Matrix management, developed in U.S. aerospace in the 1950s, achieved wider adoption in the 1970s.

== Overview ==
There are different types of matrix management, including strong, weak, and balanced, and there are hybrids between functional grouping and divisional or product structuring.

For example, by having staff in an engineering group who have marketing skills and who report to both the engineering and the marketing hierarchy, an engineering-oriented company produced "many ground-breaking computer systems." This is an example of cross-functional matrix management, and is not the same as when, in the 1980s, a department acquired PCs and hired programmers.

Often senior employees, these employees are part of a product-oriented project manager's team but also report to another boss in a functional department. A senior employee who may have worked previously for an advertising agency, designing ads for computers, may now be part of a marketing department at a computer company, but be working with an engineering group. This is often called cross-functional matrix management.

Companies that have multiple business units and international operations, upon closer inspection may apply matrix structures in different ways.

Even function-based organizations may apply this arrangement for limited projects.

== In practice ==
Examples of using matrix management:

- Digital Equipment Corporation founder Ken Olsen spawned and popularized Matrix Management.
- ABB, formed from a 1988 merger and followed by "an ambitious acquisition program." Guiding this was a corporate structure whereby "local operations were organized within the framework of a two-dimensional matrix."

As for why the term is not publicly and formally affiliated with large numbers of corporations, a 2007 book about how "matrix management made a big splash in the 1970s" said that, "for the most part ... companies using matrix structures tend to keep quiet about it."

=== Scaling back ===
Two decades after pioneering in matrix management, Digital Equipment Corporation backed out, citing it as a source of "sapped energy and efficiency from product-development efforts."

Regarding earlier years, when it worked, The New York Times praised "consensus building that may have once helped Digital become the nation's second-largest computer maker" (after IBM). The same article noted the cutting of 20,000 jobs, and that what worked with the PC market didn't work as well with larger systems, such as DEC Alpha.

This does not take away from what, a week earlier, the same author wrote: "It fostered internal competition and resulted in many ground-breaking computer systems like the PDP and VAX lines."

==== Matrix management 2.0 ====
In 2004, despite matrix management having become disfavored, Nokia made an attempt at using a form of it, later described as "matrix management 2.0". The focus is intended to be "leading without authority" so that "no one functional leader is in charge."

== Academic overview ==
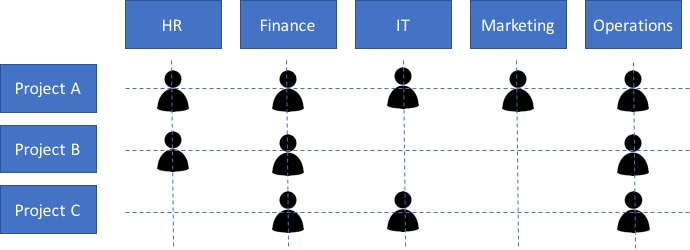
Matrix management diagram

- Christopher A. Bartlett and Sumantra Ghoshal, writing on matrix management in Harvard Business Review, quoted a line manager saying "The challenge is not so much to build a matrix structure as it is to create a matrix in the minds of our managers".
- "Designing Matrix Organizations That Actually Work" Jay R. Galbraith says "Organization structures do not fail, but management fails at implementing them successfully." He argues that strategy, structure, processes, rewards and people all need to be aligned in a successful matrix implementation.
- Making the Matrix Work: How Matrix Managers Engage People and Cut through Complexity, Kevan Hall identifies a number of specific matrix management challenges in an environment where accountability without control, and influence without authority, become the norm:
  - Context – ensure that people understand the reasoning behind the matrix
  - Cooperation – improve cooperation across the silos, but avoid bureaucracy and having too many people involved
  - Control – avoid centralization, build trust, empower people
  - Community – focus on the "soft structure" of networks, communities, teams and groups

== See also ==
- Organization development
- Colocation project management
