= The Functions of the Executive =

1938 book by Chester I. Barnard

- Detail of title page of eleventh printing
- Author: Chester I. Barnard
- Language: English
- Genre: Business/Nonfiction/Management/Leadership/Grad School
- Publisher: Harvard University Press
- Publication date: 1938
- Publication place: United States
- Media type: Print (hardcover)
- Pages: xvi + 334
- OCLC: 555075
- LC Class: HD31 .B36

The Functions of the Executive is a book by Chester I. Barnard (1886–1961) that presents a "theory of cooperation and organization" and "a study of the functions and of the methods of operation of executives in formal organizations." It was originally published in 1938; a Thirtieth Anniversary edition, published in 1968, is still in print.

The book is notable for its focus on how organizations actually operate, instead of previous approaches to organizations that emphasized "prescriptive principles." It has been praised for being one of the first books to consider leadership from a social and psychological viewpoint. An article in Public Administration Review reported that an informal advisory panel voted it one of the most influential books in public administration published between 1940 and 1990. It was voted the second most influential management book of the 20th century in a poll of the Fellows of the Academy of Management, behind The Principles of Scientific Management by Frederick Winslow Taylor.

== Background ==
Barnard attended Harvard University between 1906 and 1909 where he majored in economics; however, he did not obtain a degree. After rising through the ranks at AT&T Corporation, Barnard became president of New Jersey Bell between 1927 and 1948. At New Jersey Bell, Barnard enjoyed "long hours of self-absorbed reflection and study."

In 1936, Barnard gave a lecture at Princeton University entitled "Mind in Everyday Affairs." In the lecture, Barnard described the differences between "logical" and "non-logical" (i.e., "intuitional") mental processes. He encouraged the use of non-logical processes "for many conditions and purposes."

Barnard had many contacts with Harvard officials, for example in relation to fundraising activities. He and Lawrence Joseph Henderson were friends, and Henderson was a friend of Abbott Lawrence Lowell, who had been president of Harvard and founder of the Lowell Institute. Henderson suggested that Lowell invite Barnard to lecture at the institute, and having read "Mind in Everyday Affairs" and another lecture by Barnard, Lowell did so. Barnard gave eight extemporaneous talks at the Lowell Institute in 1937 on the topic of "functions of the executive," and on the invitation of Dumas Malone (the director of Harvard University Press who met Barnard through Arthur W. Page), he revised the material from the talks to create the book.

Barnard's philosophy and thought processes in writing the book were characterized by humanism, empiricism, speculative philosophy (the interpretation of experience in a coherent framework), and analysis of the dichotomy of individualism and collectivism. As cited in the book, his intellectual influences included Arthur F. Bentley, Vilfredo Pareto, Lawrence Joseph Henderson, Talcott Parsons, W. H. R. Rivers, Frederic Bartlett, Elton Mayo, Fritz Roethlisberger, Mary Parker Follett, James Harbord, Alfred North Whitehead, and John R. Commons. His approach diverged from the "mechanistic conceptions" of Frederick Winslow Taylor and Henri Fayol.

== Summary ==
=== Introduction to the Thirtieth Anniversary Edition ===
In the 1968 edition, the Introduction by Kenneth R. Andrews evaluates the book and summarizes its place in the management literature. Andrews concludes that it is "the most thought-provoking book on organization and management ever written by a practicing executive." He contrasts Functions of the Executive with the "classical" approaches to organizations found in books such as Principles of Management by Harold Koontz and Cyril J. O'Donnell.

=== Preface ===
Barnard gives an overview of his arguments in his Preface:

Formally this work is divided into four parts, but in a sense it consists of two short treatises. One is an exposition of a theory of cooperation and organization and constitutes the first half of the book. The second is a study of the functions and of the methods of operation of executives in formal organizations.

=== Part I ===
Part I is "Preliminary Considerations Concerning Cooperative Systems."

In Chapter I, "Introduction" (pages 3–7), Barnard notes that "formal organization is that kind of cooperation among men that is conscious, deliberate, purposeful," and that "successful cooperation in or by formal organizations is the abnormal, not the normal, condition." An individual may belong to many formal organizations, some of which may be short-lived.

Chapter II, "The Individual and Organization" (pages 8–15), states that individuals can be characterized in many ways (e.g., physical, social, psychological), but that for the purposes of discussion the book is concerned with the functional relationships among individuals in organizations. Barnard distinguishes between "effective" and "efficient" actions:

When a specific desired end is attained we shall say that the action is "effective." When the unsought consequences of the action are more important than the attainment of the desired end and are dissatisfactory, effective action, we shall say, is "inefficient." When the unsought consequences are unimportant or trivial, the action is "efficient."

The remaining chapters in Part I elaborate on the relationships among people in a "cooperative system":

- Chapter III: "Physical and Biological Limitations in Cooperative Systems" (pages 22–37) expands upon the various limitations that cooperative systems may face in their pursuit of efficiency;
- Chapter IV: "Psychological and Social Factors in Systems of Cooperation" (pages 38–45) illustrates how the efficiency of a cooperative system is subject to individual motivations and purposeful interactions;
- Chapter V: "The Principles of Cooperative Action" (pages 46–61) demonstrates how cooperative systems are applied in real-world examples in order to give its participants an invariable benefit and overcoming the shortage and limitations of individual efforts.

=== Part II ===
The book's second part concerns "The Theory and Structure of Formal Organizations."

Pages 65–81 contain Chapter VI, "The Definition of Formal Organization." In the chapter, Barnard defines "formal organization" twice as "a system of consciously coordinated activities or forces of two or more persons." The chapter outlines how Barnard developed the definition and explains that the concept of organization is abstract. It specifies that a formal organization is a certain kind of a "cooperative system," a "complex of physical, biological, personal, and social components which are in a specific systematic relationship by reason of the cooperation of two or more persons for at least one definite end.".

Chapter VI further explains that formal organization differs from other cooperative systems in that roles are formalized so as to contribute to the coordinated activities of the organization as a whole, through its participation of members, and that this is not a requirement in other types of cooperative systems.

Chapter VII, "The Theory of Formal Organization" on pages 82–95, sets forth the three elements necessary for organizations: "(1) communication; (2) willingness to serve; and (3) common purpose." Barnard suggests both: (1) that an organization that cannot accomplish its purpose cannot survive, and (2) that an organization that accomplishes its purpose has no reason for existence. Therefore, organizations are constantly adopting new purposes.

Chapter VIII, "The Structure of Complex Formal Organizations" (pages 96–113), concerns the relationship of "superior" to "subordinate" organizations, the growth of organizations, and the relationship of small working "unit organizations" to "executive organizations" within complex formal organizations.

In Chapter IX, "Informal Organizations and Their Relation to Formal Organizations" (pages 114–123), Barnard states that formal organizations coexist with informal organizations (groups of people who interact with each other outside a formal organizational structure). Benefits of informal organizations include the promotion of communication, cohesiveness, and self-respect.

=== Part III ===
Part III is titled "The Elements of Formal Organizations" and begins with Chapter X (pages 127–138) about "The Bases and Kinds of Specializations."

"The Economy of Incentives" is Chapter XI (pages 139–160). According to Barnard, "in all sorts of organizations the affording of adequate incentives becomes the most definitely emphasized task in their existence" Specific inducements range from "material inducements" to "ideal benefactions" (e.g., "pride of workmanship"), while "general incentives" include "personal comfort in social relations." Barnard's conclusions on incentives were drawn "almost entirely from observations… not from any reading."

Chapter XII, "The Theory of Authority" (pages 161–184) is notable for its summary of the conditions for authoritative communications, its explanation of "zone of indifference," and its distinction between "authority of position" and "authority of leadership."

- Concerning authoritative communications, Barnard wrote:

A person can and will accept a communication as authoritative only when four conditions simultaneously obtain: (a) he can and does understand the communication; (b) at the time of his decision he believes that it is not inconsistent with the purpose of the organization; (c) at the time of his decision, he believes it to be compatible with his personal interest as a whole; and (d) he is able mentally and physically to comply with it.

- Barnard discusses the concept of "zone of indifference," which is "perhaps the most well-known idea in the book," as follows:

...there exists a "zone of indifference" in each individual within which orders are acceptable without conscious questioning of their authority… The zone of indifference will be wider or narrower depending upon the degree to which the inducements exceed the burdens and sacrifices which determine the individual's adhesion to the organization. It follows that the range of orders that will be accepted will be very limited among those who are barely induced to contribute to the system.

- "Authority of position" is explained as occurring when people "impute authority to communications from superior positions… to a considerable extent independent of the personal ability of the incumbent of the position." In contrast, people with superior ability have "authority of leadership." When a person has both types of authority, the subordinate will "accept[] orders far outside the zone of indifference."

In Chapter XIII, "The Environment of Decision" (pages 185–199), Barnard contemplates how personal decision-making and organizational decision-making differ. He states "The fine art of executive decision consists in not deciding questions that are not now pertinent, in not deciding prematurely, in not making decision that cannot be made effective, and in not making decisions that others should make."

Part III concludes with Chapter XIV, "The Theory of Opportunism" (pages 200–211).

=== Part IV ===
"The Functions of Organizations in Cooperative Systems" constitutes the final part of the book. It begins with Chapter XV ("The Executive Functions," pages 215–234) and Chapter XVI ("The Executive Process," pages 235–257).

Chapter XVII on "The Nature of Executive Responsibility" (pages 258–284) discusses morality. Barnard observes that "cooperation, not leadership, is the creative process; but leadership is the indispensable fulminator of its forces." In turn, morality is critical to leadership: "organizations endure… in proportion to the breadth of the morality by which they are governed."

The "Conclusion" (Chapter XVIII, pages 285–296) highlights 16 major observations of the book and contemplates the relationship of science and art in management:

I believe that the expansion of cooperation and the development of the individual are mutually dependent realities, and that a due proportion or balance between them is a necessary condition of human welfare. Because it is subjective with respect both to a society as a whole and to the individual, what this proportion is I believe science cannot say. It is a question for philosophy and religion.

=== Appendix ===
The Appendix (pages 301–322) contains the text of Barnard's 1936 "Mind in Everyday Affairs" lecture.

== Criticisms ==
Criticisms of the book include:

- It is "deadly… [with] little meaning today."
- Its prose has been characterized as "difficult to read," "heavy," "turbid," and "atrocious." Even the Introduction to the Thirtieth Anniversary Edition notes the "ponderousness of Barnard's style."
- The definition of "efficiency" in Chapter II is confusing.
- The definition of "formal organization" in Chapter VI has been subject to considerable scrutiny. Although Hal G. Rainey acknowledged that the definition did distinguish Barnard from the "classical theorists" of management, he characterized it as "completely inadequate." Lyndall Urwick stated that "boy kisses girl" could qualify as an organization under Barnard's definition.
- Statements such as "Personal aversions based upon racial, national, color, and class differences often seem distinctly pernicious; but on the whole they are, in the immediate sense, I believe, based upon a sound feeling of organization necessities" (page 147) have been assessed as "unenlightened" by today's standards.
- Barnard's ideas about authority in Chapter XII have been summarized as a "bottom-up power" theory that fails to acknowledge the reality that it is "sometimes the job of corporate leaders to use power to control, repress, and arrest the actions of their subordinates."
- A passage on page 319 ("…It is consequently necessary to say things in a form which is not correct from the standpoint of the speaker or writer…") has been interpreted as "advocating lying."
- Barnard did not write in any detail about the relationship between an organization and the customers of that organization.
- The book does not consider how an executive of a corporation interacts with the board of directors or stockholders.
- There is no significant mention of the education of staff (i.e., the executive's role as a teacher).

== Legacy ==
Cover of 30th Anniversary Edition (1968)

The Functions of the Executive was to be the only book that Barnard ever wrote; however, he also wrote articles for journals, and collections of such articles have been published in books (e.g., the 1948 book Organization and Management). By 2010, the book had received over 8,000 citations in Google Scholar. Among other works, the book influenced:

- Administrative Behavior by Herbert A. Simon (1947). In a 1988 interview, Simon was quoted as follows:

Of course I built squarely on Barnard, and have always felt deeply indebted to him; science is a cumulative endeavor. My general debt is expressed in the acknowledgements [p. xivii of the Second Edition]: "To Mr. Charles [sic] I. Barnard I owe a special debt: first, for his own book The Functions of the Executive.…" In the book itself there are fourteen references to Barnard…. the notions of the contribution-inducement equilibrium, authority, and zone of acceptance were all derived from Barnard…. What I would now regard as the principal novelties in Administrative Behavior are the development of the concept of organizational identification…, the description of the decision process in terms of the processing of decision premises, and the bounded rationality notions…. Most of the rest is highly "Barnardian," and certainly even those "novel" ideas are in no way inconsistent with Barnard's view of organizations.

- The Human Group by George C. Homans (1950).
- The Human Side of Enterprise by Douglas McGregor (1960).
- New Patterns of Management by Rensis Likert (1961).
- A Behavioral Theory of the Firm by Richard Cyert and James G. March (1963).
- Markets and Hierarchies: Analysis and Antitrust Implications by Oliver E. Williamson (1975).

Barnard's book also anticipated In Search of Excellence by Tom Peters and Robert H. Waterman, Jr., the concept of management by objectives that Peter Drucker popularized, the two-factor theory of Frederick Herzberg, and Maslow's hierarchy of needs.

Examples of papers that have examined Barnard's "zones of indifference" concept include:

- A 1994 textual analysis of Barnard's work.
- A 2000 psychological study that compared leaders' and followers' ratings of the followers' willingness to perform assignments from the leaders. Leaders rated the assignments as "less enjoyable, undesirable, more above the call of duty, and more likely to be resisted" than the followers reported.
- A 2001 qualitative study that examined how workplaces might have wider or narrower zones of indifference concerning the rights of employees infected with HIV under the Americans with Disabilities Act.

As of 1961, the book had sold over 35,000 copies. As of 1982, the book had gone through 29 printings, and the Thirtieth Anniversary edition is still in print. It has been translated into many languages, including Arabic, Chinese, German, Hebrew, Italian, Japanese, Polish, Portuguese, Spanish, Swedish, and Turkish.

In 1988, the University of California, Berkeley held a series of seminars to celebrate the 50th anniversary of the book's publication; eight of the lectures became essays in a 1995 book edited by Oliver E. Williamson. One issue of the International Journal of Public Administration in 1994 contained papers in honor of Barnard, many of which concerned the book. Joseph T. Mahoney of the University of Illinois at Urbana-Champaign wrote that The Functions of the Executive "is the most high-powered intellectual contribution to organization or economic theory ever written by a practicing manager" and that it appears to inspire students by conveying an "aesthetic feeling of managing."

Although an informal advisory panel voted Administrative Behavior by Herbert Simon the most influential 1940–1990 book in academic public administration, "panel members had a tendency to associate Simon and Barnard," and one panel member wrote that Barnard's book was "the truly seminal work." The Functions of the Executive appeared in at least four lists of "best" or "most influential" management and business books between 2001 and 2011.
