= Odiorne =

Odiorne is a surname. Notable people with the surname include:

- George S. Odiorne (1920–1992), American academic and management theorist
- James Creighton Odiorne (1802–1879), American businessman and author
