= High Output Management =

1983 book by Andy Grove

High Output Management is a 1983 book by Andy Grove, CEO of Intel. It describes many of the management and productivity concepts that Grove used at Intel, such as the objectives and key results (OKR).

High Output Management never reached best seller lists during the 1980s or 1990s, but became a cult classic within Silicon Valley decades later and is frequently praised for its influence by tech founders such as Mark Zuckerberg of Meta, Evan Williams of Twitter, Brian Chesky of Airbnb, and Ben Horowitz of venture capital firm a16z.

== Background ==
In contrast to popular management books of the 1980s mostly written by consultants, High Output Management was written by Grove, a CEO with a PhD in electrical engineering with a lifetime of experience.

== Synopsis ==
High Output Management introduces Grove's "management by objective" approach, also known as the objectives and key results (OKR) framework.

It has been described as a "crash course for middle managers" and discuses the importance of measurable processes, performance reviews, and trainings.

== Reception and influence ==
When it was first published in 1983, the New York Times called High Output Management "an organizational Baedeker for managers at all levels," and the Washington Post described it as "interesting, down-to-earth book that is useful to anyone who influences the work of others, directly or indirectly."

High Output Management never reached best seller lists during the 1980s or 1990s or received the same level of recognition as Grove's other management book Only the Paranoid Survive. However, the book became a cult classic within Silicon Valley decades later and is frequently praised for its influence by tech founders such as Mark Zuckerberg of Meta, Evan Williams of Twitter, and Brian Chesky of Airbnb. The rise in popularity is credited to its promotion by well-known venture capitalist Ben Horowitz and by startup founders who stayed on with their companies as CEOs. Horowitz describes the book as having "almost legendary status," with top venture capitalists giving copies to their entrepreneurs.

Drew Houston, founder of Dropbox, listed High Output Management as one of his four favorite business books.

In response to High Output Management's resurgence in popularity, publisher Vintage Books reissued a new edition of the book in 2015, the first since 1995, and an e-book version.

The OKR framework that Groves describes is widely used in companies in the 21st century. British political strategist Dominic Cummings reportedly recommended High Output Management to government aides after the 2019 United Kingdom general election.
