= Andrew Grove =

American businessman (1936–2016)

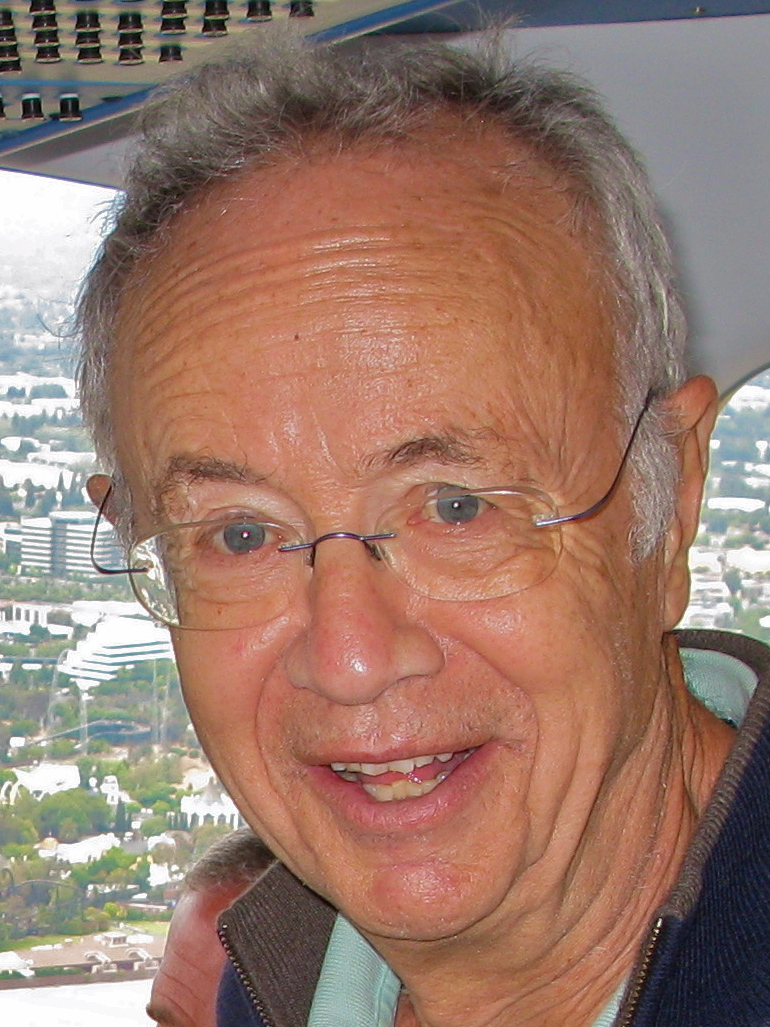
- Grove in 2009
- Born: Gróf András István; September 2, 1936; Budapest, Hungary
- Died: March 21, 2016 (aged 79); Los Altos, California, U.S.
- Education: City College of New York (BS); University of California, Berkeley (PhD)
- Occupations: businessman, engineer, senior advisor
- Known for: third CEO of Intel Corporation, first COO and third employee, 1968
- Notable work: College textbook, Physics and Technology of Semiconductor Devices (1967); Management book, Only the Paranoid Survive (1996)
- Predecessor: Gordon Moore
- Successor: Craig Barrett
- Spouse: Eva Kastan (1958–death)
- Children: 2
- Awards: J J Ebers Award (1974); Time Man of the Year, 1997; Chief Executive magazine, CEO of the Year, 1997

Andrew "Andy" Stephen Grove (born Gróf András István; 2 September 1936 – 21 March 2016) was a Hungarian-American businessman and engineer who served as the third CEO of Intel Corporation. He left Hungary during the 1956 revolution at the age of 20 and moved to the United States, where he finished his education. He was the third employee and eventual third CEO of Intel, transforming the company into the world's largest semiconductor company.

As a result of his work at Intel, along with his books and professional articles, Grove had a considerable influence on the electronics manufacturing industries worldwide. He has been called the "guy who drove the growth phase" of Silicon Valley. In 1997, Time magazine chose him as "Man of the Year", for being "the person most responsible for the amazing growth in the power and the innovative potential of microchips." One source notes that by his accomplishments at Intel alone, he "merits a place alongside the great business leaders of the 20th century."

== Personal life and education ==
Grove was born as Gróf András István to a middle-class Jewish family in Budapest, Hungary, the son of Mária and György Gróf. At the age of four he contracted scarlet fever, which was nearly fatal and caused partial hearing loss.

When he was eight, the Nazis occupied Hungary and deported nearly 500,000 Jews to concentration camps, including Auschwitz. To avoid being arrested, Grove and his mother took on false identities and were sheltered by friends. His father, however, was arrested and taken to an Eastern Labor Camp where he was severely tortured and forced to do slave labor. The father was reunited with his family only after the war.

During the Hungarian Revolution of 1956, when he was 20, he left his home and family and escaped across the border into Austria. Penniless and barely able to speak English, in 1957 he eventually made his way to the United States. He later changed his name to the anglicized Andrew S. Grove. Grove summarized his first twenty years of life in Hungary in his memoirs:

By the time I was twenty, I had lived through a Hungarian Fascist dictatorship, German military occupation, the Nazis' "Final Solution," the siege of Budapest by the Soviet Red Army, a period of chaotic democracy in the years immediately after the war, a variety of repressive Communist regimes, and a popular uprising that was put down at gunpoint... [where] many young people were killed; countless others were interned. Some two hundred thousand Hungarians escaped to the West. I was one of them.

Shortly after arriving in the United States, Grove worked summer jobs as a busboy at a resort in New Hampshire, where he met Eva Kastan, an Austrian refugee, who was working as a waitress while studying at Hunter College. The two met in 1957 and married in Queens, New York, in June 1958. They remained married until Grove's death and had two daughters, Karen Grove and Robie Livingstone, and eight grandchildren.

Even though he arrived in the United States with little money, Grove retained a "passion for learning."

He earned a bachelor's degree in chemical engineering from the City College of New York in 1960. The New York Times stated that "a refugee became a senior in engineering."

Grove attended and graduated with his Ph.D. in chemical engineering from the University of California, Berkeley in 1963.

In 1995 he was diagnosed with prostate cancer. He described his experience in an influential cover article in Fortune in which he criticized the health care system for the lack of communication between different specialists and the unavailability of data compared to the tech industry.

In 2000, he was diagnosed with Parkinson's disease; he became a contributor to several foundations that sponsor research towards a cure. He died at his home on March 21, 2016, at the age of 79; the cause of death was not publicly disclosed.

== Career ==
=== Starting Intel ===
When I came to Intel, I was scared to death. I left a very secure job where I knew what I was doing and started running R&D for a brand new venture in untried territory. It was terrifying.

— Andrew Grove

After completing his Ph.D. in 1963, Grove worked at Fairchild Semiconductor as a researcher, and by 1967 had become its assistant director of development. His work there made him familiar with the early development of integrated circuits, which would lead to the "microcomputer revolution" in the 1970s. In 1967, he wrote a college textbook on the subject, Physics and Technology of Semiconductor Devices.

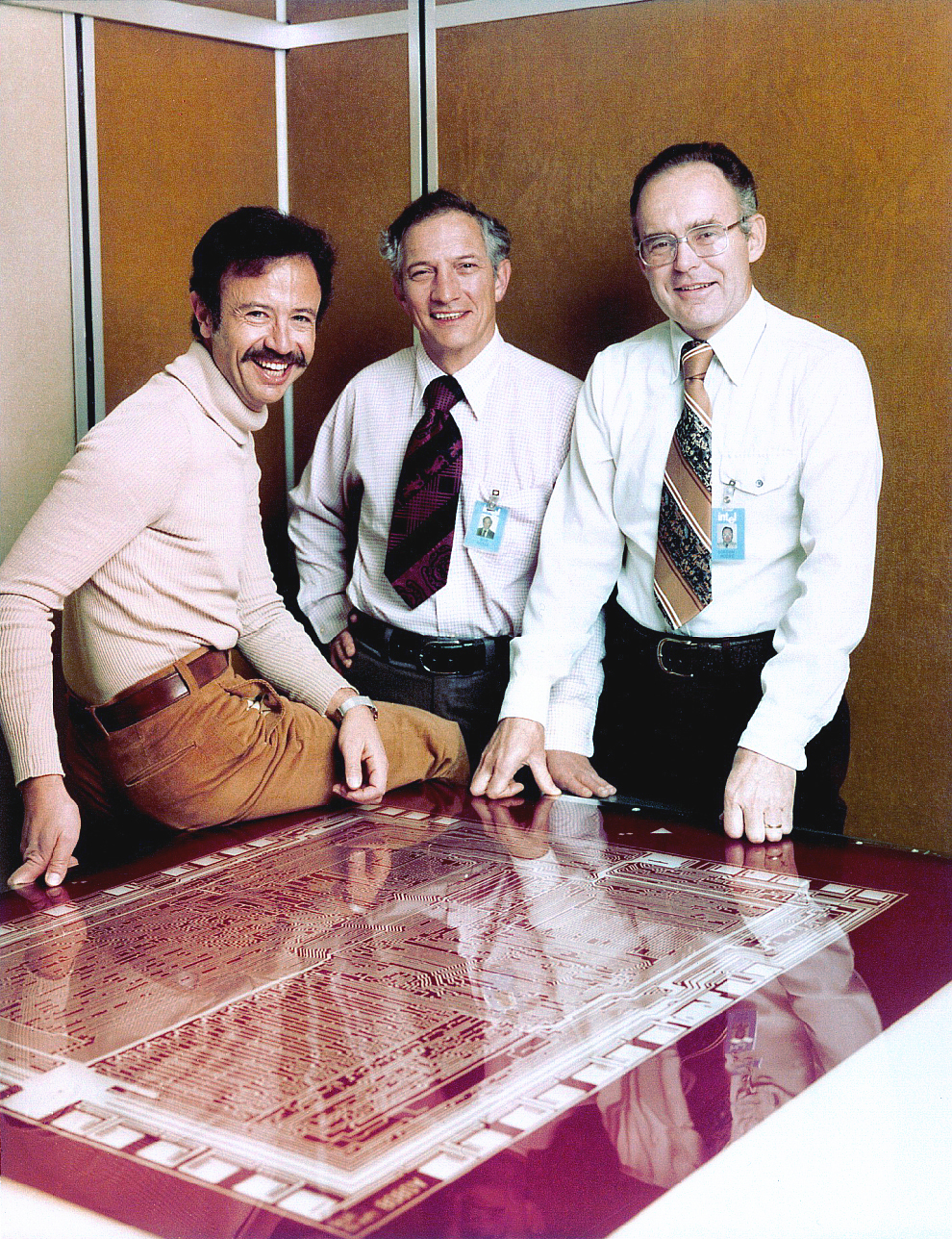
Left to right: Andy Grove, Robert Noyce and Gordon Moore (1978)

In 1968, Robert Noyce and Gordon Moore co-founded Intel, after they and Grove left Fairchild Semiconductor. Grove joined on the day of its incorporation, although he was not a founder. Fellow Hungarian émigré Leslie L. Vadász was Intel's fourth employee. Grove worked initially as the company's director of engineering, and helped get its early manufacturing operations started. In 1983, he wrote a book, High Output Management, in which he described many of his methods and manufacturing concepts.

Initially, Intel primarily manufactured static memory chips for mainframe computers, but in the early/mid-1970s Intel introduced one of the earliest digital watches, an electronic calculator, and also the world's first general-purpose microprocessor, the 4-bit 4004. By 1974 Intel had developed the 8-bit 8008 and quickly thereafter, in 1975, the 8080 processor, which would become the core of the Altair, the world's first so-called PC (personal computer) which foreshadowed the PC revolution. Soon came the 8086 16-bit microprocessor and a cost-reduced version, the 8088, which IBM chose for its IBM PC which brought personal computers to the masses. In 1985, Intel produced the 32-bit 80386 microprocessor which began a long line of increasingly powerful microprocessors including the 80486, the Pentium, and a plethora of supporting integrated circuits and computers built with them.

Even though Intel had invented most of the types of memory in use at the time including EPROM (Erasable Programmable Read-Only Memory), by 1985, with less demand for their memory chips due to the challenges created by Japanese "dumping" of memory chips at below-cost prices, Grove was forced to make radical changes. As a result, he chose to discontinue producing DRAMs and focus instead on manufacturing microprocessors. Grove, along with Intel's sales manager to IBM, Earl Whetstone, played a key role in negotiating with IBM to use only Intel microprocessors in all of their new personal computers.

The company's revenue increased from $2,672 in its first year (1968) to $20.8 billion in 1997. Grove was appointed Intel's president in 1979, CEO in 1987, and then chairman of the board in 1997. In May 1998 Grove relinquished the post of CEO to Craig Barrett, as Grove had been diagnosed with prostate cancer a few years earlier, though he remained chairman until November 2004. Since then Grove remained at Intel as a senior advisor, and has also been a lecturer at Stanford University. He reflected back upon Intel's growth through the years:

In various bits and pieces, we have steered Intel from a start-up to one of the central companies of the information economy.

Grove is credited with having transformed Intel from a manufacturer of memory chips into the world's dominant producer of microprocessors for PC, servers, and general-purpose computing. During his tenure as CEO, Grove oversaw a 4,500% increase in Intel's market capitalization from $4 billion to $197 billion, making it the world's 7th largest company, with 64,000 employees. Most of the company's profits were reinvested in research and development, along with building new facilities, in order to produce improved and faster microprocessors. (Despite his company's dependence on sales to PC companies, Grove thought personal computers were not useful and difficult to use. He only began using them regularly after Intel deployed email throughout the company in 1989, and Microsoft Windows 3.0 appeared in 1990.)

=== Management methods and style ===
Probably no one person has had a greater influence in shaping Intel, Silicon Valley, and all we think about today in the technology world than Andy Grove.

— Pat Gelsinger, CEO of VMware, and later CEO of Intel

As director of operations, manufacturing became Grove's primary focus and his management style relied heavily on his management concepts. As the company expanded and he was appointed chairman, Grove became more involved in strategic decision-making, including establishing markets for new products, coordinating manufacturing processes and developing new partnerships with smaller companies.

Grove helped create the Intel Architecture Laboratory (IAL) in Oregon to ensure that software was developed in time to take advantage of their new microprocessors. Grove stated that "you are making decisions about what the information technology world will want five years into the future."

==== Only the paranoid survive motto ====
Business success contains the seeds of its own destruction. Success breeds complacency. Complacency breeds failure. Only the paranoid survive.

— Andy Grove, former CEO of Intel

As CEO, he wanted his managers to always encourage experimentation and prepare for changes, making a case for the value of paranoia in business. He became known for his guiding motto: "Only the paranoid survive," and wrote a management book with the same title, published in 1996. As a result, he urged senior executives to allow people to test new techniques, new products, new sales channels, and new customers, to be ready for unexpected shifts in business or technology. This mantra of Groves influenced the management philosophy of a number of well-known leaders like Jeff Bezos, Satya Nadella, and Reed Hastings.

Biographer Jeremy Byman observed that Grove "was the one person at Intel who refused to let the company rest on its laurels." Grove explains his reasoning:

A corporation is a living organism; it has to continue to shed its skin. Methods have to change. Focus has to change. Values have to change. The sum total of those changes is transformation.

==== Strategic inflection points ====
Grove popularized the concept of the "strategic inflection point," a crucial time that demands a major change in strategy due to shifts in the business environment. A company's growth depends on recognizing and effectively navigating these points.

Strategic inflection points cause a mismatch between a company's current strategies and changes in the industry, something Grove called strategic dissonance. "To overcome this, the dissonance must be resolved by aligning the company's strategies with the new reality, requiring proactive and adaptive leadership that continually assesses and adjusts the company's strategies to keep pace with shifts in the business environment," taught Grove.

Grove believed that the role of Helpful Cassandras, individuals who raise red flags about potential problems and challenge the dominant view, are crucial in identifying and mitigating risks before they become bigger issues. He emphasized the importance of organizations listening to the warnings of Cassandras and taking action, instead of ignoring or suppressing them, in order to identify and successfully address strategic inflection points.

==== Competitive mindset ====
Grove had a strong competitive mindset, viewing competition as the key driver of innovation and progress. He encouraged companies to aim for industry leadership and constantly seek ways to improve their offerings, processes and operations. He likened himself to a coach and viewed the manager's role as one of fueling employee motivation to excel. He believed "good fear" could play a productive role.

"The quality guru W. Edwards Deming advocated stamping out fear in corporations. I have trouble with the simplemindedness of this dictum. The most important role of managers is to create an environment where people are passionately dedicated to winning in the marketplace. Fear plays a major role in creating and maintaining such passion. Fear of competition, fear of bankruptcy, fear of being wrong and fear of losing can all be powerful motivators."

==== Constructive confrontation ====
Grove fostered a culture of open communication where employees were encouraged to speak their minds in a "constructive confrontation" approach. "People here aren't afraid to speak up and debate with Andy," said Intel Senior VP Ron Whittier. According to Grove's successor at Intel, Craig Barrett, "It's give and take, and anyone in the company can yell at him. He's not above it." Grove insisted that people be demanding on one another, which fostered an atmosphere of "ruthless intelligence." About that philosophy, writes business author Ken Goldstein, "you bought into it or got your walking papers."

==== Egalitarian ethos ====
Grove asserted that knowledge power surpasses positional power. He ingrained that philosophy in the workplace culture at Intel. "We argue about issues, not the people who advocate them." As a testament to this ethos, there were no executive perks at Intel, including special dining rooms, washrooms, or parking spots. Grove's office was a standard 8 by 9 ft (2.4 by 2.7 m) cubicle, reflecting his personal preference for an egalitarian atmosphere. Grove disliked "mahogany-paneled corner offices." "I've been living in cubicles since 1978—and it hasn't hurt a whole lot." This accessibility made his workspace open to anyone who walked by.

This workplace culture is a reflection of Grove's personal life, where he was known for his modesty and lack of pretense. He lived simply, without luxury cars or private planes, and was described by venture capitalist Arthur Rock as having "no airs."

==== Attention to detail ====
Grove was noted for making sure that important details were never missed, with one of his favorite sayings being, "the devil is in the details." Intel Vice President Dennis Carter states that "Andy is very disciplined, precise, and detail oriented. According to Industry Week magazine, Grove feared that the "brilliance that sparked the creation of Intel" during its early years "might come to nothing if somebody didn't pay attention to details." Carter recalls that Grove would even correct his spelling errors despite English being his second language.

=== The Father of the objectives and key results (OKR) approach to management ===
One of the earliest investors in Google, John Doerr, called Grove the "Father of OKRs" in Doerr's 2018 book, Measure What Matters: How Google, Bono, and the Gates Foundation Rock the World with OKRs. An acronym for objectives and key results, it became central to Google's culture as a "management methodology that helps to ensure that the company focuses efforts on the same important issues throughout the organization." The objective is the clearly defined goal, while the key results were the specific benchmarks to ensure achievement of that goal were "measurable and verifiable."

In 1975, Doerr wrote of attending a course within Intel taught by Grove, where he was introduced to the theory of OKRs. Grove explained his perspective on management: "The key result has to be measurable. But at the end you can look, and without any arguments: Did I do that or did I not do it? Yes? No? Simple. No judgments in it."

Larry Page, co-founder of Google, credited OKRs in the foreword to Doerr's book: "OKRs have helped lead us to 10x growth, many times over. They've helped make our crazily bold mission of 'organizing the world's information' perhaps even achievable. They've kept me and the rest of the company on time and on track when it mattered the most."

=== Preference for a "job-centric" American economy ===
While Grove supported helping technology startups, he also felt that America was wrong in thinking that those new companies would increase employment. "Startups are a wonderful thing," he wrote in a 2010 article for Bloomberg, "but they cannot by themselves increase tech employment." Although many of those startups and entrepreneurs would achieve tremendous success and wealth, said Grove, he was more concerned with the overall negative effect on America: "What kind of a society are we going to have if it consists of highly paid people doing high-value-added work and masses of unemployed?"

Grove felt that employment growth depended on those companies' ability or willingness to scale up within the US. According to Grove, Silicon Valley's "innovation machine" over the last few decades has not been adding many jobs, although American tech companies have instead been adding jobs in Asia "like mad." He noted that while American investments in startups have increased dramatically, those investments have in fact resulted in fewer jobs: "Simply put," he wrote, "the U.S. has become wildly inefficient at creating American tech jobs." He therefore worked to keep Intel's manufacturing in the US, with the company having 90,000 employees in 2010. He explained the causes and effects of many business's growth plans:

Each company, ruggedly individualistic, does its best to expand efficiently and improve its own profitability. However, our pursuit of our individual businesses, which often involves transferring manufacturing and a great deal of engineering out of the country, has hindered our ability to bring innovations to scale at home. Without scaling, we don't just lose jobs—we lose our hold on new technologies. Losing the ability to scale will ultimately damage our capacity to innovate.

To remedy the problem, he strongly believed that "job creation" should become America's primary objective, much as it is in Asian nations. Among the methods he felt were worth considering was the imposition of a tax on imported products, with the funds received then made available to help American companies scale their operations in the US. However, he also accepted the fact that his ideas would be controversial: "If what I'm suggesting sounds protectionist, so be it." Or that those protectionist steps could lead to conflicts with trade partners: "If the result is a trade war, treat it like other wars—fight to win." He added:

All of us in business have a responsibility to maintain the industrial base on which we depend and the society whose adaptability—and stability—we may have taken for granted.

Grove was also in the minority of high-tech leaders when he advocated taxing internet sales made to other states: "I don't think electronic commerce needs federal or state subsidies in terms of tax advantages," he told a Congressional committee in 2000. At the same hearing, he also expressed his opinion about internet privacy, stating that "personal data is a form of property and it's inevitable that governments will regulate property rights." He said that it would be better if the federal government established its own uniform privacy standards rather than have states create a patchwork of different laws.

=== Writing and teaching ===
Grove was also a noted author and scientist. His first book on semiconductors, Physics and Technology of Semiconductor Devices (1967), has been used by leading universities. Another book he wrote on business operation methods, High Output Management (1983). He also wrote over 40 technical papers and held several patents on semiconductor devices.

Grove wrote Only the Paranoid Survive (1996), a business book, whose core message is that a company in pursuit of a stronger competitive advantage never rests.

He also taught graduate computer physics courses at the University of California, Berkeley and the Stanford Graduate School of Business.

=== Philanthropy ===
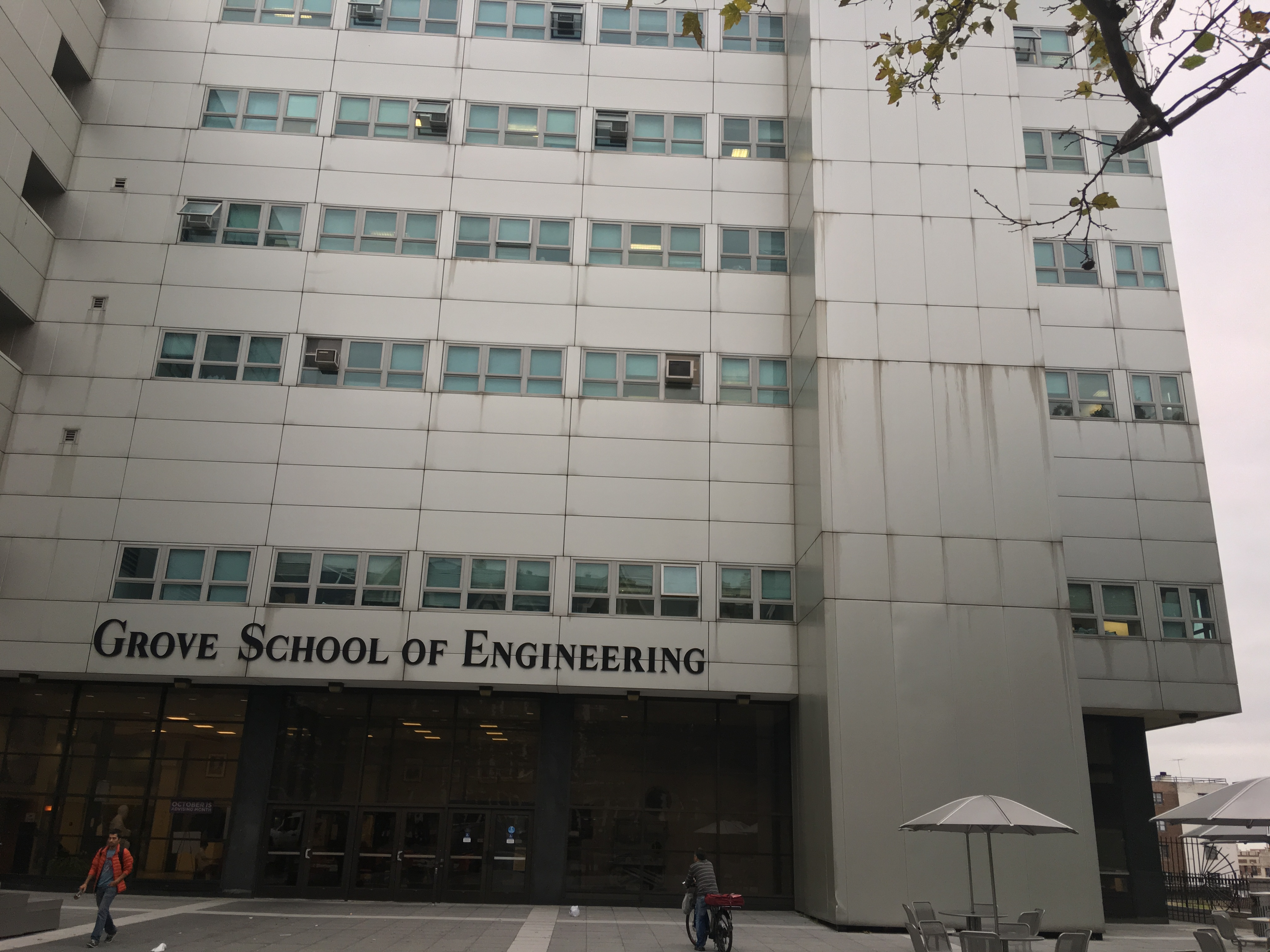
Grove School of Engineering-CCNY

In 2005, Grove made the largest donation that the City College of New York (CUNY) has ever received. His grant of $26 million transformed the CCNY School of Engineering into the Grove School of Engineering.

Grove was also instrumental, as a key fundraiser, in establishing the University of California, San Francisco's Mission Bay Campus, the largest ongoing biomedical construction project in the world. Chancellor Sam Hawgood said that Grove's "generous and tireless support of UCSF has transformed our university and helped accelerate our research into breakthrough treatments and better patient care."

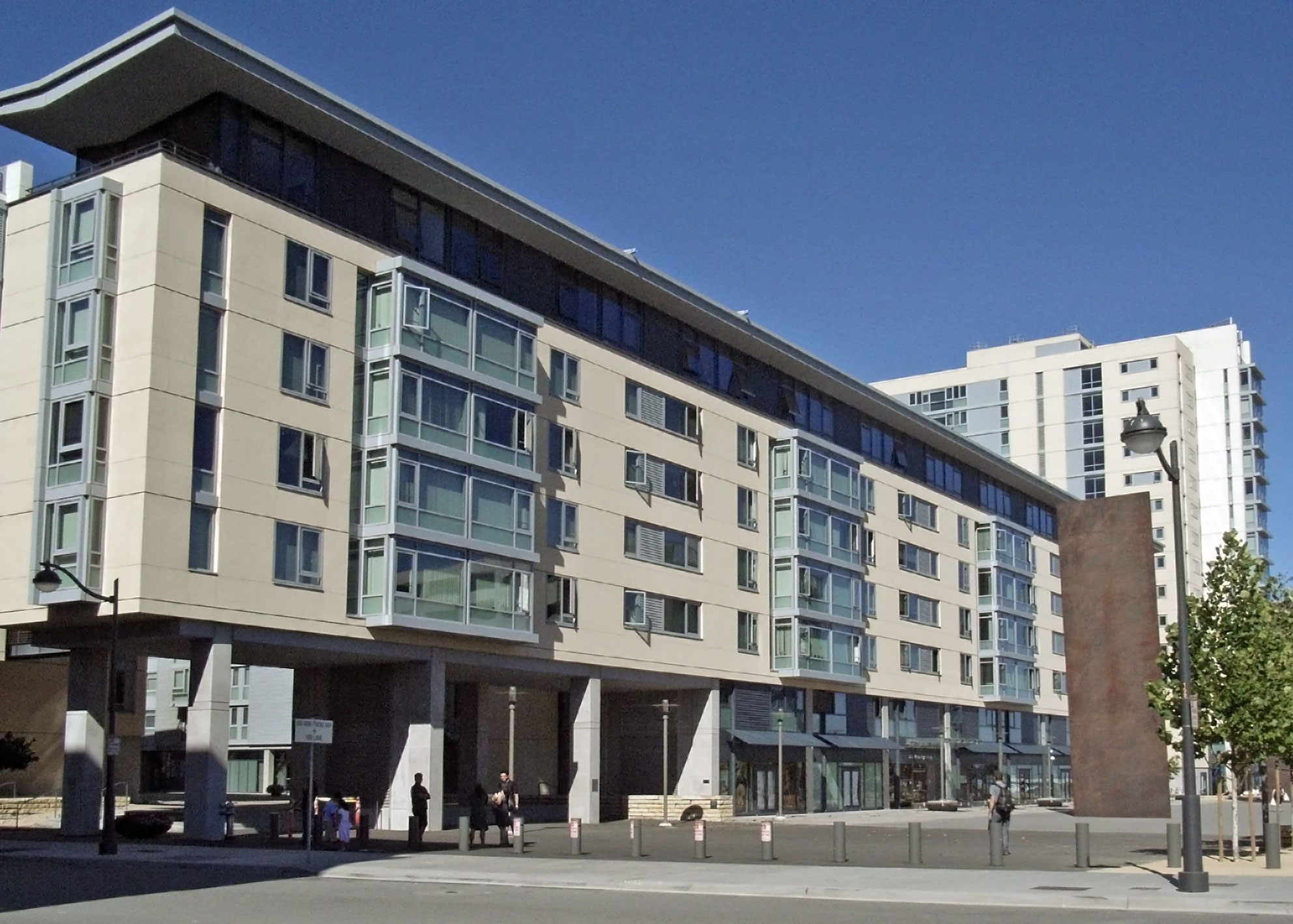
UCSF Mission Bay campus

Among the research facilities which he helped fund were the UCSF Prostate Cancer Center, the Helen Diller Family Cancer Research Building, and the Clinical and Translational Science Institute. He also promoted general surgery initiatives and supported various obstetrics and gynecology research programs.

Grove was a longtime member of the International Rescue Committee (IRC), along with being one of its overseers and a member of its board of directors. He was also the founding supporter of the IRC's Pathways to Citizenship program. In 2010, the IRC honored him as one of ten distinguished refugees. In an interview in Esquire magazine in 2000, Grove encouraged the United States to be "vigilant as a nation to have tolerance for difference, a tolerance for new people." He pointed out that immigration and immigrants are what made America what it is.

== Honors and awards ==
- Grove received honorary degrees from the City College of New York (1985), Worcester Polytechnic Institute (1989) and Harvard University (2000).
- Grove was named Time Person of the Year in 1997.
- In 2004, the Wharton School of Business recognized him as the "Most Influential Business Person of the Last 25 Years."
- The 1st Annual Heinz Award in Technology, the Economy and Employment. Grove received the award in 1995, and he was honored by the foundation for representing a story "as old as America: the story of a young immigrant rising to great success." The donors of the award added that Grove "has played perhaps the single most pivotal role in the development and popularization of the twentieth century's most remarkable innovation – the personal computer."
- On August 25, 2009, California Governor Arnold Schwarzenegger announced that Grove would be one of 13 California Hall of Fame inductees in The California Museum's yearlong exhibit. The induction ceremony was on 1 December 2009 in Sacramento, California.
- Strategic Management Society's Lifetime Achievement Award (2001)
- IEEE Medal of Honor (2000)
- Time magazine's Man of the Year (1997)
- IndustryWeek Technology Leader of the Year (1997)
- Chief Executive's CEO of the Year (1997)
- Medal of Achievement from the American Electronics Association (1993)
- IEEE Engineering Leadership Recognition Award (1987)
- Franklin Institute Certificate of Merit (1975)

== Books ==
- A. S. Grove (1967). Physics and Technology of Semiconductor Devices. Wiley. ISBN 0-471-32998-3.
- A. S. Grove (1988). One on One With Andy Grove. Penguin Putnam. ISBN 0-14-010935-8.
- A. S. Grove (1995). High Output Management. Random House. ISBN 0-679-76288-4. (originally published in 1983)
- A. S. Grove (1996). Only the Paranoid Survive. Doubleday. ISBN 0-385-48258-2.
- A. S. Grove (2001). Swimming Across: A Memoir. Grand Central. ISBN 0-446-67970-4.
- Robert Burgelman and A. S. Grove (2001). Strategy Is Destiny: How Strategy-Making Shapes a Company's Future. Free Press. ISBN 0-684-85554-2.
- Robert A. Burgelman, Andrew S. Grove and Philip E. Meza (2005). Strategic Dynamics: Concepts and Cases. McGraw-Hill/Irwin. ISBN 0-07-312265-3.

Business positions
Preceded by Gordon Moore	CEO, Intel; 1987–1998	Succeeded by Craig Barrett
