= ManagePro =

Performance management software

Angbert Enterprises, LLC
- Company type: Privately held
- Industry: Software
- Founded: 1998
- Headquarters: Downey, California, United States
- Products: Project management software, Application performance management
- Website: www.angbertenterprises.com

ManagePro is a software solution developed by Angbert Enterprises LLC, a company based in Downey, California, specializing in software and IT consulting.

== History ==
In 1992, Avantos Performance Systems created ManagePro, drawing inspiration from Drucker's Management by Objectives philosophy. It was dubbed as "MBA-ware" due to its focus on management software.

In 1998, Performance Solutions Technology acquired ManagePro and revamped it to integrate project and performance management features. The new version emphasized supporting a strategic management approach rooted in Action Learning principles, as outlined in David Allen's "Get Things Done", connecting day-to-day task management with broader strategic goals.

Angbert Enterprises LLC acquired it once more in 2018. The company is planning another overhaul, focusing on adding cross-platform capabilities and creating a cloud and tablet application.

Back in 2002, ManagePro collaborated with MindJet, known for their MindManager software. This partnership allowed users to visually capture and communicate ideas and information.

In 2008, ManagePro introduced a Microsoft Outlook Add-in. This tool lets users seamlessly connect emails to specific projects, tasks, or phases of their work process.

== Software ==
Available as a Windows desktop application (ManagePro(R)). It includes components for general goal and project management, strategic planning, task management, document management, scorecards, performance reviews, time cards, and WBS (Work Breakdown Structure).

== See also ==
- Project Management
- Management by Objectives
- Decision making software
- Gantt charts
- Portfolio management
