= Chester Barnard =

American businessman (1886–1961)

Chester Irving Barnard
- Born: November 7, 1886; Malden, Massachusetts
- Died: June 7, 1961 (aged 74); New York City
- Citizenship: American
- Education: Harvard University (unfinished)
- Known for: The Functions of the Executive (1938)
- Scientific career
- Fields: Organizational theory

Chester Irving Barnard (November 7, 1886 – June 7, 1961) was an American business executive, public administrator, and the author of pioneering work in management theory and organizational studies. His landmark 1938 book, The Functions of the Executive, sets out a theory of organization and of the functions of executives in organizations. The book has been widely assigned in university courses in management theory and organizational sociology. Barnard viewed organizations as systems of cooperation of human activity, and wrote that they are typically short-lived. According to Barnard, organizations are generally not long-lived because they do not meet the two criteria necessary for survival: effectiveness and efficiency.

== Biography ==
In his youth, Barnard worked on a farm, then working as a piano tuner, paid his way through high school at the Mount Hermon School. After graduation he studied economics at Harvard University on a scholarship, earning money selling pianos and operating a dance band. He did not obtain his Harvard BA because he did his four-year work in three years and could not complete a science course, but a number of universities later granted him honorary doctorates.

Barnard joined the American Telephone and Telegraph Company (AT&T) in 1909. In 1927, he became president of the New Jersey Bell Telephone Company. During the Great Depression, he directed the New Jersey state relief system.

He was elected a Fellow of the American Academy of Arts and Sciences in 1939 and the American Philosophical Society in 1943. He was president of the United Service Organizations (USO), 1942–45. Upon retiring from business, he served as president of the Rockefeller Foundation, 1948–52, and as chairman of the National Science Foundation, 1952–54. End 1950s he was among the first members of the Society for General Systems Research.

== Work ==
Barnard viewed organizations as systems of cooperation of human activity, and noted that they are typically short-lived. It is rare for a firm to last more than a century. Similarly most nations last for less than a century. The only organization that can claim a substantial age is the Roman Catholic Church. According to Barnard, organizations are not long-lived because they do not meet the two criteria necessary for survival: effectiveness and efficiency. Effectiveness, is defined the usual way: as being able to accomplish stated goals. In contrast, Barnard's meaning of organizational efficiency differed substantially from the conventional use of the word. He defined efficiency of an organization as the degree to which that organization is able to satisfy the motives of the individuals. If an organization satisfies the motives of its members while attaining its explicit goals, cooperation among its members will last.

Barnard was a great admirer of Talcott Parsons (1902–1979) and he and Parsons corresponded persistently. The two scholars would send manuscripts for commentary to each other and they would write long letters where they engage in a common theoretical discussion. The first correspondence between Barnard and Parsons began in the end of the 1930s and it persisted essentially to Barnard’s death in 1961.

=== The Functions of the Executive ===
Barnard's classic 1938 book, The Functions of the Executive discusses, as the title suggests, the functions of the executive, but not from a merely intuitive point of view, but instead deriving them from his conception of cooperative systems.

Barnard summarized the functions of the executive as follows:

- Establishing and maintaining a system of communication;
- Securing essential services from other members;
- Formulating organizational purposes and objectives.
- To manage people and make sure they do their jobs

=== Authority and incentives ===
Barnard formulated two interesting theories: one of authority and the other of incentives. Both are seen in the context of a communication system grounded in seven essential rules:

- The channels of communication should be definite;
- Everyone should know of the channels of communication;
- Everyone should have access to the formal channels of communication;
- Lines of communication should be as short and as direct as possible;
- Competence of persons serving as communication centers should be adequate;
- The line of communication should not be interrupted when the organization is functioning;
- Every communication should be authenticated.

Thus, what makes a communication authoritative, rests with the subordinate, rather than with his superior. Barnard's perspective had affinities to that of Mary Parker Follett and was very unusual for his time, and that has remained the case down to the present day. He seemed to argue that managers should obtain authority by treating subordinates with respect and competence.

As for incentives, he proposed two ways of convincing subordinates to cooperate: tangible incentives and persuasion. Barnard gives great importance to persuasion, much more than to economic incentives. He described four general, and four specific incentives. The specific incentives were:

1. Money and other material inducements;
2. Personal non-material opportunities for distinction;
3. Desirable physical conditions of work;
4. Ideal benefactions, such as pride of workmanship etc.

The general incentives were:

1. Associated attractiveness (based upon compatibility with associates)
2. Adaptation of working conditions to habitual methods and attitudes
3. The opportunity for the feeling of enlarged participation in the course of events
4. The condition of communing with others (personal comfort with social relations, opportunity for comradeship etc., )

== See also ==
- Organizational studies
- Outline of organizational theory

== Selected publications ==
- 1938. The Functions of the Executive
- 1939. Dilemmas of Leadership in the Democratic Process.
- 1946. A Report on the International Control of Atomic Energy.
- 1948. Organization and Management
- 1956. Organization and Management: Selected Papers
- 1956. On the Teaching of Law in the Liberal Arts Curriculum. With Harold Joseph Berman. Harvard Law
- 1958. Elementary Conditions of Business Morals.
- 1973. Conversations With Chester I. Barnard. Edited by William B. Wolf.
- 1986. Philosophy for Managers; Selected Papers of Chester I. Barnard. Edited by William B. Wolf and Haruki Iino.

== Archives and records ==
- Chester I. Barnard papers at Baker Library Special Collections, Harvard Business School.
- Works by or about Chester Barnard at the Internet Archive

Non-profit organization positions
Preceded by Raymond B. Fosdick	President of the Rockefeller Foundation; August 22, 1948 – July 17, 1952	Succeeded by Dean Rusk
