= Robert Rodin =

American business executive and writer (born 1953)

- Born: c. 1954
- Education: University of Connecticut
- Occupations: business executive, writer
- Known for: CEO and president of Marshall Industries

Robert Rodin (born c. 1953) is an American business executive and author who is best known for transforming Marshall Industries into a pioneering business-to-business e-commerce leader while CEO from 1992 to 1999. Some have referred to him as "visionary" for his early advocacy of commerce on the Internet. He is currently the chairman and CEO of RDN Group, a strategic advisory firm, and Vice Chairman of RLH Equity Partners. He holds board positions with Astound Commerce, Imre, Shift7 Digital, Biorasi, Supplyframe and Inspirage. He serves on non-profit boards of YPO LA Gold, ALS Therapy Development, and Advisor to Cancer Commons.

== Education ==
Rodin attended Bloomfield High School in Connecticut. In 1972, he and classmates coded a dating program for the senior class, chronicled in the Hartford Current as the “Love Computer”. Rodin enrolled at the University of Connecticut studies included biology, physics, calculus, chemistry, statistics, and psychology. Special projects included studies in marketing, attention spans, and consumer behavior. In 1977, Rodin graduated with a Bachelor of Arts degree in psychology. He was later inducted into the University of Connecticut School of Business Hall of Fame in 2002.

== Business career ==
After graduation, he started off in the restaurant industry. He joined Marshall Industries in 1983 as a sales manager. Based in El Monte, California, the firm was a global distributor of electronic components including semiconductors, electrical connectors, and computer peripherals. Marshall's suppliers included Advanced Micro Devices and Toshiba. Marshall Industries customers included IBM, Solectron, and WebTV.

Rodin was promoted to corporate vice president in 1988 and succeeded Gordon S. Marshall as CEO of Marshall Industries in 1992. During Rodin’s tenure as CEO, Marshall Industries reported six consecutive years of record net sales and was one of the first companies to conduct E-commerce on the Internet. It was reported Rodin often ran around headquarters dressed as Batman, telling his employees to ship their faces off.

=== Profit-sharing ===
As chief executive, Rodin instituted changes at Marshall—influenced by the management theory and "quality movement" of W. Edwards Deming—that did away with individual incentives for his sales force and instead offered his employees a profit-sharing plan based on the company's overall performance. These changes were based on Deming's basic tenet, which stated you only get what the system will deliver and the company itself is one system. Rodin said of the changes, "We talked to every single person in this company during the conversion. It took great patience, and a lot of sleepless nights. I was scared to death about making changes." Dennis Trombley, a former marketing executive at Marshall, later claimed that Marshall would not have survived without Rodin’s changes.

Rodin supported the new compensation structure because of its transparency and adaptability. He argued that commission-based compensation incentivized employees to make distortions in operations and budgeting to meet sales quotas. Salespeople at the company shipped a disproportionate amount of products in the last three days of each month, often ahead of schedule to meet quotas and win prizes in sales contents. Different divisions of the company hid inventory from one another and disputed over budgeting, which delayed capital investments to improve the firm. Rodin would later describe the divisions by saying, “It was Detroit vs. Chicago instead of Marshall vs. the world." In a 1998 interview for Fortune Rodin noted the inflexibility and inefficiency of commission-based incentive structures: "How do you design an incentive system robust enough to accommodate every change in every customer and every product and every market every day? You can't—you'd be designing it the rest of your life." Soon after the changes to the compensation structure Marshall reported that productivity per person had almost tripled.

=== E-commerce innovation ===
Soon after Rodin viewed a demo of the Mosaic web browser in December 1993, Marshall implemented its first digital strategy. Marshall launched its website on July 27, 1994, three months before Netscape released the first commercial browser. Rodin originally dubbed the service E-Trade, until he discovered the online stockbroker was using the same name. The company replaced its printed product catalogs with a website, Marshall on the Internet, and launched an intranet called MarshallNet that allowed customers to track their orders. Kerry Young, Marshall's vice president of IT noted: “It wasn’t easy to develop this stuff, because there weren’t any people around to ask questions of. Nobody had really done it before."

In 1997, PC Week ranked Marshall third in a list of the "most aggressive adopters of innovating products," citing the company's intranet. In 1997 and 1998, Business Marketing named Marshall the top business-to-business marketing website – no other leading distributors made the list of 200 sites. Marshall was also named best business-to-business website in the Netmarketing Top 200 in 1997 and 1998. And Marshall was later named best business-to-business website two years in a row by Advertising Age.

Marshall issued laptop computers to its entire sales force and installed Lotus Notes across the firm. Rodin also made Marshall the first industrial distributor to provide live customer service 24 hours-a-day, via call centers as well as online chat sessions. Rodin said of Marshall's customer service philosophy, “No one ever asks for sales person: they ask for someone to help them.” By 1998 Marshall’s network of branch locations served more than 60,000 customers and delivered sales and technical support 24 hours-a-day, 7 days-a-week. Sales per person more than doubled during Rodin's tenure, from $360,000 to $740,000.

In 1999, Marshall was acquired by Avnet, Inc., based in Phoenix, Arizona. During his tenure as CEO, Marshall's annual sales increased from $500 million to $2 billion. The management changes that Rodin implemented have been the subject of case studies at Harvard Business School, Massachusetts Institute of Technology, Stanford University, and the University of Southern California.

=== Advising ===
From 1999 until 2002, Rodin served as the chairman and CEO of eConnections, which provided business intelligence solutions for supply chain management. There after, he founded RDN Group, a management consulting firm. Rodin has served on the board of directors for Roxio, RosettaNet, and CommerceNet. He has also held advisory board positions with the University of Southern California and the University of Connecticut School of Business.

== Writing ==
In 1999, Rodin released his first book, Free, Perfect and Now: Connecting to the Three Insatiable Customer Demands, published by Simon & Schuster. Free, Perfect, and Now chronicles Rodin's transformation of Marshall Industries from a successful $500 million business into a Web-enabled $2 billion powerhouse.

== Personal life ==
Rodin resides in Pasadena, California with his wife, Debbie.

== List of works ==
- Free, Perfect and Now: Connecting to the Three Insatiable Customer Demands ISBN 0684850222
