= Marshall Industries =

Marshall Industries NYSE: MI, (1984–1999) was founded in 1954 by Gordon S. Marshall and was among the largest distributors of industrial electronic components, semiconductors and production supplies. The Company also provided its customers with a variety of value added services such as inventory management, kitting, programming of logic devices and testing services. The Company distributed over 250,000 different products manufactured by over 5000 suppliers to more than 250,000 global customers which included a wide range of original equipment manufacturers, contract manufacturers and value-added resellers. Marshall Industries was sold to Avnet Inc. (NYSE: AVT)

The Company's dramatic transformation and growth from $400 million to $1.8 billion was chronicled in W. Edwards Deming's last book The New Economics, a Harvard Case Study, and Free Perfect and Now, by Marshall President and CEO from 1992 to 1999 Robert Rodin, a protégé of Deming's.
