= Objectives and key results =

Framework used to define measurable goals and their outcomes

Objectives and key results (OKR, alternatively OKRs) is a goal-setting framework used by individuals, teams, and organizations to define measurable goals and track their outcomes. The development of OKR is generally attributed to Andrew Grove who introduced the approach to Intel in the 1970s and documented the framework in his 1983 book High Output Management.

== Overview ==
OKRs comprise an objective (a significant, concrete, clearly defined goal) and 3–5 key results (measurable success criteria used to track the achievement of that goal).

Not only should objectives be significant, concrete, and clearly defined, they should also be inspirational for the individual, team, or organization that is working towards them. Objectives can also be supported by initiatives, which are the plans and activities that help to move forward the key results and achieve the objective.

Key results should be measurable, either on a 0–100% scale or with any numerical value (e.g. count, dollar amount, or percentage) that can be used by planners and decision makers to determine whether those involved in working towards the key result have been successful. There should be no opportunity for "grey area" when defining a key result.

== History ==
Andrew Grove popularised the concept of OKR during his tenure at Intel in the 1970s. He later documented OKR in his 1983 book High Output Management.

In 1975, John Doerr, at the time a salesperson working for Intel, attended a course within Intel taught by Grove where he was introduced to the theory of OKRs, then called "iMBOs" ("Intel Management by Objectives").

Doerr, who by 1999 was working for venture capital firm Kleiner Perkins, introduced the idea of OKRs to Google. The idea took hold and OKRs quickly became central to Google's culture as a "management methodology that helps to ensure that the company focuses efforts on the same important issues throughout the organization".

Doerr published a book about the OKR framework titled Measure What Matters in 2018. Grove's concept is explained by John Doerr in his book:

The key result has to be measurable. But at the end you can look, and without any arguments: Did I do that or did I not do it? Yes? No? Simple. No judgments in it.

Larry Page, former CEO of Alphabet and co-founder of Google, credited OKRs within the foreword to Doerr's book:

OKRs have helped lead us to 10× growth, many times over. They’ve helped make our crazily bold mission of 'organizing the world’s information' perhaps even achievable. They've kept me and the rest of the company on time and on track when it mattered the most.

Since becoming popular at Google, OKRs have found favor with several other similar large tech organizations including LinkedIn, Twitter, Uber, Microsoft and GitLab.

== Best practices ==
Doerr recommends that an organization's target success rate for key results be 70%. A 70% success rate encourages competitive goal-making that is meant to stretch workers at low risk. If 100% of the key results are consistently being met, the key results should be reevaluated. Considering this, OKRs are scored on a scale of 0.0 to 1.0, with 0.7 being the normal target for "aspirational" Key Results (where the aim is to make as much progress as possible), and 1.0 being the expected target for "committed" Key Results (where the outcome is the delivery of a product or feature, meeting a deadline, or a binary "done" or "not done" status).

Organizations should be careful in crafting their OKRs such that they don't represent business as usual since those objectives are, by definition, not action-oriented and inspirational. Words like "help" and "consult" should also be avoided as they tend to be used to describe vague activities rather than concrete, measurable outcomes.

When coming up with key results, it is also recommended to measure leading indicators instead of lagging indicators. Leading indicators are readily measurable and provide organizations with an early warning when something isn't going right so they can course-correct. Conversely, lagging indicators are those metrics which can't be attributed to particular changes and so prevent organizations from course-correcting in time.

== Criticism ==
OKRs were once typically set at the individual, team, and organization levels; however, most organizations no longer define OKRs for individual contributors as these OKRs tend to look like a task list and lead to conflating OKRs with performance reviews. The motivation for starting OKRs at the company, team, and individual levels was inspired by the 2014 Google Ventures Workshop Recording in which Rick Klau explains that OKRs exist at 3 levels. Subsequently, in November 2017, Klau clarified via twitter: “Skip individual OKRs altogether. Especially for younger, smaller companies. They’re redundant. Focus on company- and team-level OKRs.” Additionally, there is criticism that creating OKRs at multiple levels may cause too much of a waterfall approach, something that OKRs in many ways intend to avoid.

== See also ==
- Management by objectives
- Objectives, goals, strategies and measures (OGSM)
- Key performance indicator (KPI)
- Balanced scorecard
- SMART criteria
- Goal, question, metric (GQM)
