= Homer Sarasohn =

American engineer (1916–2001)

Homer M. Sarasohn
- Born: May 24, 1916
- Died: September 28, 2001 (aged 85)
- Spouse: Shirley Sarasohn
- Scientific career
- Fields: Quality Management, Radio Engineering

Homer Sarasohn, an IEEE Life Member (24 April 1916 – September 28, 2001), was an American engineer.

When General Douglas MacArthur recruited him to re-establish the Japanese electronics industry, Mr. Sarasohn initiated the quality control standards for which Japan's electronic industry became known. He also wrote books on quality control, one of the earliest being Fundamentals of Industrial Management, which is still in print in Japan.

Homer Sarasohn originally focused on the radio industry, since MacArthur saw that as a method to use as a tool of occupation for direct communication with the Japanese people. He worked with Charles Protzman, who had been charged with running Japan's telephone system. When they returned to the United States, Sarasohn recommended W. Edwards Deming to continue the campaign of quality that he and Protzman had begun.

He fought with the 161st Airborne Engineers in World War II, until receiving a medical discharge at the end of 1943. He then worked on Project Cadillac (military radar systems) at the Massachusetts Institute of Technology (MIT).

Mr. Sarasohn's wife of 62 years, Shirley Sarasohn, died in November 2001. He is survived by their daughters Linda Kingdon and Lisa Sarasohn and by their grandchildren Sara and David Kingdon.

== Life and career ==
Mr. Sarasohn worked at Raytheon Manufacturing Company in Waltham, MA, where he designed, built, and installed an experimental microwave radio transmission system for wideband general communication use. During World War II he worked at the MIT Radiation Lab and supervised the production of innovative radar systems for critical military applications.

Mr. Sarasohn was 29 when General Douglas MacArthur summoned him to Tokyo to restore Japan's communications industry following its destruction during World War II.

From 1946 through 1950, as chief of the Industry Branch of the occupation army's Civil Communications Section (CCS), Mr. Sarasohn took the lead in helping Japan rebuild its capacity to manufacture radio, telephone, and telegraph equipment—and to assure the reliable quality of its industrial production.

Upon his return from Japan, Mr. Sarasohn worked as a management consultant with Booz, Allen & Hamilton in New York and later at IBM in several positions including Director of Engineering Communications. During his tenure at IBM he made significant contributions to the integration of computerized data processing and telecommunications.

Before and after his retirement in 1977, Mr. Sarasohn served as a consultant and technical advisor on the exchange and dissemination of engineering information both nationally and worldwide. He was, for example, Technical Advisor to the U.S. Assistant Secretary for Science and Technology and a member of the U.S. delegations to Egypt and the Soviet Union.

Mr. Sarasohn served as an IEEE divisional director, president of the Engineering Management Society, and IEEE representative to the Russian Popov Society. He also organized and served as general chairman for the 14th Annual Joint Engineering Management Conference.
