= If Japan Can... Why Can't We? =

1980 NBC News documentary

"If Japan Can... Why Can't We?" is an American television program broadcast by NBC News as part of the documentary television series NBC White Paper on June 24, 1980, credited with beginning the Quality Revolution and introducing the methods of W. Edwards Deming to American managers that was produced by Clare Crawford-Mason and reported on by Lloyd Dobyns.

The report details how the Japanese captured the world automotive and electronics markets by following Deming's advice to practice continual improvement and think of manufacturing as a system, not as bits or pieces. Crawford-Mason went on to produce; in collaboration with Deming, a 14-hour documentary series detailing his methods through lecture excerpts, interviews, practical demonstrations, and case studies of companies that adopted his methods.

== Background ==
During the 1980s, Japan was seen to be a manufacturing powerhouse while American industry was struggling to keep pace. It was strongly believed that Japanese manufacturing techniques were uniquely developed for and suited to the Japanese culture, and thus unsuited for American culture.
