= James Creighton Odiorne =

American businessman and author (1802–1879)

- Born: June 4, 1802; London, England
- Died: February 5, 1879 (aged 76); Wellesley, Massachusetts, U.S.
- Education: Yale College
- Occupations: Businessman; writer
- Spouse(s): Susan Elizabeth Warren (m. 1828; died 1851) Frances M. Meacham (m. 1870)
- Children: 6

James Creighton Odiorne (June 4, 1802 – February 5, 1879) was an American businessman and writer from Massachusetts.

== Early life ==
James Creighton Odiorne was born on June 4, 1802, in London, England, to Maria (née Creighton) and George Odiorne. His father was a merchant of Boston, Massachusetts. While in England for two years for work, his father married his third wife, Maria Creighton, a daughter of reverend James Creighton. He attended Phillips Academy. He graduated from Yale College in 1826.

== Career ==
In 1828, Odiorne became a partner with his father in the iron and nail trade in Boston. He left the business in 1837. In 1857, he moved to Framingham and still spent winters in Boston.

In 1830, Odiorne published Opinions on Speculative Masonry, a 300-page volume critiquing Freemasonry. In 1832, he helped form the New England Anti-Slavery Society and served as its treasurer. He was a member of the American Statistical Association and the Boston Society of Natural History. In 1875, he published Genealogy of the Odiorne Family.

== Personal life ==
Odiorne married Susan Elizabeth Warren, eldest daughter of Isaac Warren, of Framingham on June 25, 1828. They had four sons and two daughters. His wife died in 1851. He married Frances M. Meacham, daughter of George Meacham, of Cambridge on June 8, 1870.

Odiorne died on February 5, 1879, in Wellesley while traveling on a train to Boston.

This article incorporates public domain material from the Yale Obituary Record.
