= Pride of workmanship =

Sense of having done good work, an element of job satisfaction

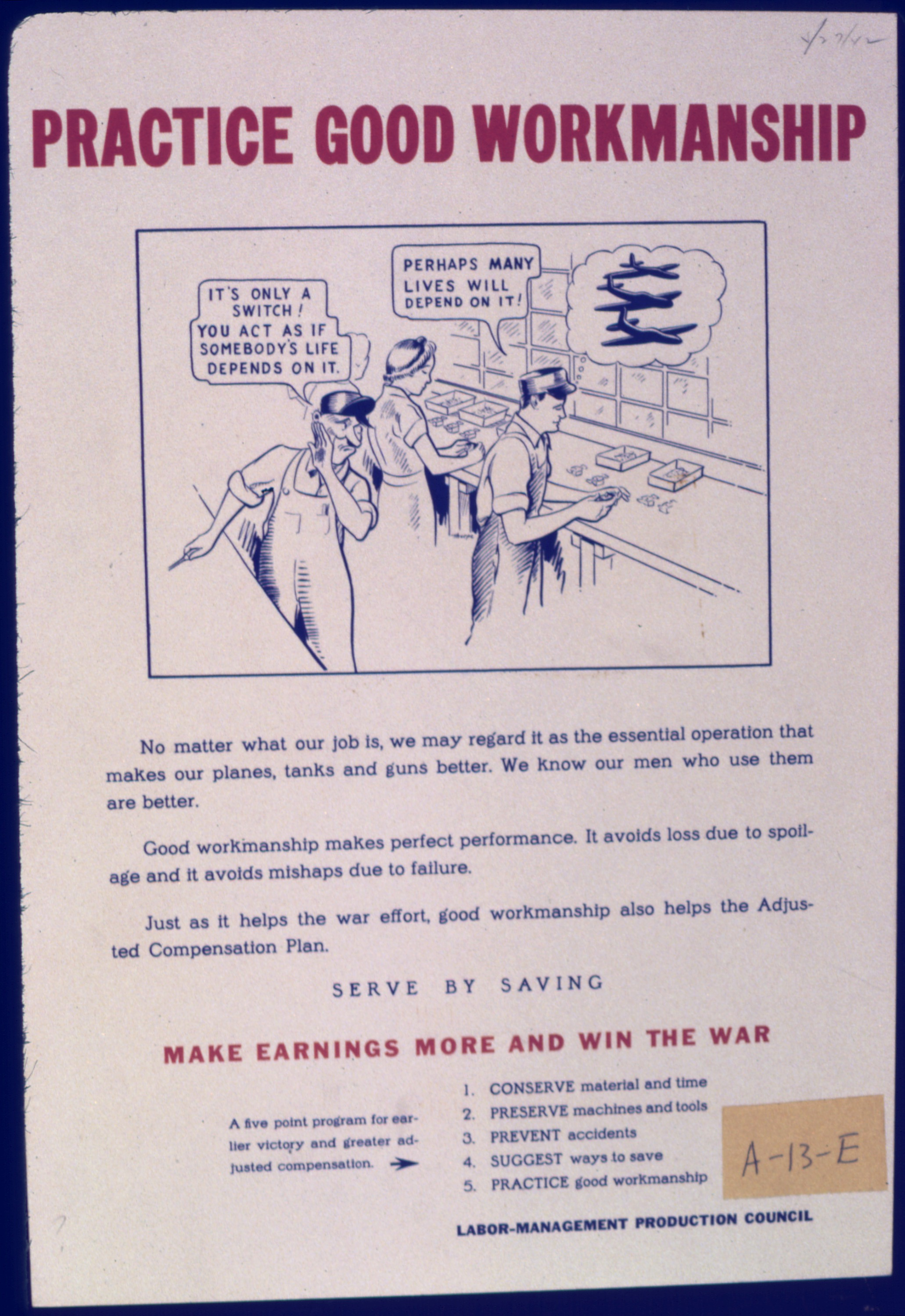
Propaganda poster encouraging good workmanship (cirka 1942 or 1943)

Pride of workmanship is the gratifying sense of having done good work. It is an element of job satisfaction. One of the key principles in the philosophy of management consultant W. Edwards Deming is that workers have a right to pride of workmanship:

1. Remove barriers that rob the hourly worker of his right to pride of workmanship. The responsibility of supervisors must be changed from sheer numbers to quality.
2. Remove barriers that rob people in management and in engineering of their right to pride of workmanship. This means, among other things, abolishment of the annual or merit rating and of management by objective.

== Importance ==
In Out of the Crisis (1982), Deming argues that pride of workmanship is more important to workers than "gymnasiums, tennis courts, and recreation areas," and that barriers to pride of workmanship are a major obstacle to cost reduction and quality improvement.

Economist Thorstein Veblen advocated transferring control of industry from financial and business people to engineers, who were most likely to be driven by pride of workmanship and curiosity.

== Luddites revolt ==
During the Industrial Revolution, the factory system destroyed the workers' traditional way of life, depriving them of pride of workmanship, among other things. In the late 18th and early 19th centuries, workers responded by destroying machines and factories in what were called the Luddite revolts.

== Bibliography ==
- Deming, William Edwards (2000) [1982]. Out of the Crisis. MIT Press. ISBN 9780262541152.
- Hunt, E. K. (2016). "Social Protest Amid the Industrial Revolution". Property and Prophets: The Evolution of Economic Institutions and Ideologies. Routledge. pp. 64–84. ISBN 9781317461982.
- Tool, Marc R., ed. (1988). "Institutional Economics and the Theory of Production". Evolutionary Economics: Institutional Theory and Policy. M.E. Sharpe. pp. 53–75. ISBN 9780873324823.
