= George S. Odiorne =

American academic and management theorist

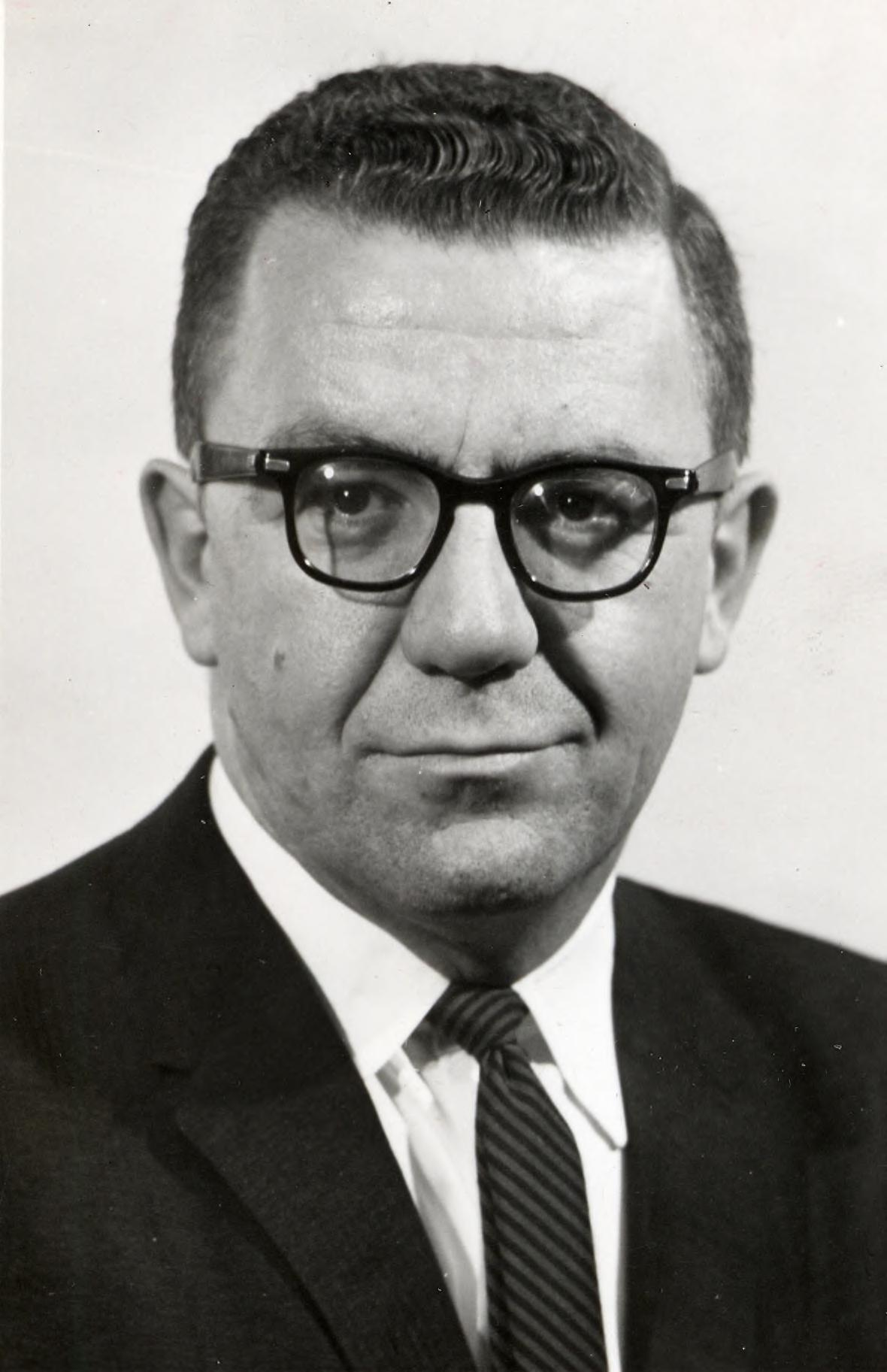
- Born: George Stanley Odiorne; November 4, 1920; Merrimac, Massachusetts, U.S.
- Died: January 19, 1992 (aged 71); St. Petersburg, Florida, U.S.
- Education: Rutgers University; New York University
- Occupation: Management theorist
- Spouse: M. Janet Hanna
- Children: 1

George Stanley Odiorne (November 4, 1920 – January 19, 1992) was an American academic and management theorist. He was one of the developers of the theory, Management by Objectives (MBO).

== Early life ==
George S. Odiorne was born in 1920 in Merrimac, Massachusetts. He grew up in Lowell, and he had a brother and two sisters. During World War II, he served in the United States Army in the Pacific. He graduated from Rutgers University. He then earned a master's degree and a doctorate in business administration from New York University, where he was taught by Peter Drucker.

== Career ==
Odiorne began his career as a foreman for the American Can Company in Jersey City, New Jersey, before the war. By the 1950s, he taught at his alma mater, Rutgers University. He subsequently worked as a management consultant for the American Management Association and General Mills. From 1958 to 1968, Odiorne was a professor of Industrial Relations at the University of Michigan, where he was also the director of the Industrial Relations Bureau. He served as the dean of the David Eccles School of Business at the University of Utah from 1968 to 1974, and the Isenberg School of Management at the University of Massachusetts from 1974 to 1983. He was a professor at Eckerd College in St. Petersburg, Florida, from 1983 to 1989.

Over the course of his career, Odiorne published 26 books and 300 articles. He was one of the developers of the theory known as Management by Objectives (MBO).

== Personal life and death ==
Odiorne married M. Janet Hanna. They had a son, Robert H. Odiorne.

Odiorne died of a heart attack on January 19, 1992, at the Humana Hospital-Northside in St. Petersburg, Florida. He was 71.

== Works ==
- Odiorne, George S. (1965). Management by Objectives: a System of Managerial Leadership. New York City: Pitman.
- Odiorne, George S. Management decisions by objectives. (1969).
- Odiorne, George S. Management and the activity trap. New York: Harper & Row, 1974.
- Odiorne, George S. MBO II, a system of managerial leadership for the 80s. Fearon Pitman Publishers, 1979.
- Odiorne, George S. Strategic management of human resources. Jossey-Bass, 1984.
- Odiorne, George S. The human side of management. Lexington Books, 1990.

Articles, a selection

- Odiorne, George S. "An application of the communications audit." Personnel Psychology 7.2 (1954): 235-243.
- Odiorne, George S. "The trouble with sensitivity training." Training Directors Journal 17.10 (1963): 9-20.
- Odiorne, George S. "The change resisters." The Personnel Administrator 26.1 (1981): 57-63.
