= Gordon S. Marshall =

American businessman

Gordon S. Marshall (1919 – June 2, 2015) was an American businessman and philanthropist. He was the founder of Marshall Industries (NYSE: MI), a publicly traded company from 1984 to 1999. Gordon S. Marshall died on June 2, 2015, at the age of 95.

== Early life ==
Gordon S. Marshall was born in Los Angeles, California, in 1919. He graduated from South Pasadena High School in 1937 and the University of Southern California College of Commerce in 1946 with a degree in accounting. He served as a bomber pilot for the United States in World War II. He was an amateur radio operator (call sign W6RR (ex-W6ITA)) and credited amateur radio with leading him into his successful career in electronics.

== Career ==
Marshall founded his namesake company Marshall Industries, headquartered in El Monte, California, in 1982. He served as its president from April 1982 to June 1992, and as its chief executive officer until 1994. The company became one of the nation's five largest distributors of industrial electronic components and production supplies. In 1999, it was acquired by Avnet (NYSE: AVT).

He served on the board of directors of the Amistar Corporation (OTCMKTS:AMTA) from 1974.

== Philanthropy ==
Marshall served on the board of trustees of the University of Southern California. He donated US$35 million to USC in 1997. The USC Marshall School of Business is named in his memory.
