= W. Edwards Deming =

American engineer and statistician (1900–1993)

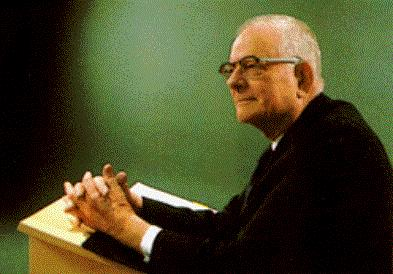
- Born: William Edwards Deming; October 14, 1900; Sioux City, Iowa, U.S.
- Died: December 20, 1993 (aged 93); Washington, D.C., U.S.
- Education: University of Wyoming (BS); University of Colorado (MS); Yale University (PhD)
- Known for: PDSA, total quality management, quality control
- Spouses: Agnes Bell (m. 1922; died 1930) Lola Elizabeth Shupe (m. 1932; died 1986)
- Children: 3
- Scientific career
- Fields: Business administration and theory, economics, industrial engineering, music, statistics

William Edwards Deming (October 14, 1900 – December 20, 1993) was an American business theorist, composer, economist, industrial engineer, management consultant, statistician, and writer. Educated initially as an electrical engineer and later specializing in mathematical physics, he helped develop the sampling techniques still used by the United States Census Bureau and the Bureau of Labor Statistics. He is also known as the father of the quality movement, known as "Lean manufacturing" today, and was hugely influential in post-WWII Japan, credited with revolutionizing Japan's industry and making it one of the most dominant economies in the world. He is best known for his theories of management.

== Overview ==
Deming received a BS degree in electrical engineering from the University of Wyoming at Laramie (1921), an MS degree from the University of Colorado (1925), and a PhD from Yale University (1928). Both graduate degrees were in mathematics and physics. He had an internship at Western Electric's Hawthorne Works in Cicero, Illinois, while studying at Yale. He later worked at the U.S. Department of Agriculture and the Census Bureau. While working under Gen. Douglas MacArthur as a census consultant to the Japanese government, he was asked to teach a short seminar on statistical process control (SPC) methods to members of the Radio Corps, at the invitation of Homer Sarasohn. During this visit, he was contacted by the Union of Japanese Scientists and Engineers (JUSE) to talk directly to Japanese business leaders, not about SPC, but about his theories of management, returning to Japan for many years to consult. Later, he became a professor at New York University, while engaged as an independent consultant in Washington, D.C.

Deming was the author of Quality Productivity and Competitive Position, Out of the Crisis (1982–1986), and The New Economics for Industry, Government, Education (1993), and books on statistics and sampling.

He also played the flute and drums, and composed music throughout his life, including sacred choral compositions and an arrangement of "The Star-Spangled Banner."

In 1993, he founded the W. Edwards Deming Institute in Washington, D.C., where the Deming Collection at the U.S. Library of Congress includes an extensive audiotape and videotape archive. The aim of the institute is to "Enrich society through the Deming philosophy."

Deming's teachings and philosophy are clearly illustrated by examining the results they produced after they were adopted by Japanese industry, as the following example (called the Ford-Mazda study) shows. Ford Motor Company was simultaneously manufacturing a car model with transmissions made in Japan (by Mazda) and the United States (by Ford). Soon after the car model was on the market (c. 1950), Ford customers were requesting the model with Japanese transmissions over the US-made transmissions, and they were willing to wait for the Japanese model. As both transmissions were made to the same specifications, Ford engineers could not understand the customer preference for the model with Japanese transmissions. Finally, Ford engineers decided to take apart the two different transmissions. The American-made car parts were all within specified tolerance levels. However, the Japanese car parts were virtually identical to each other, and much closer to the nominal values for the parts—e.g., if a part was supposed to be one foot long, plus or minus 1/8 of an inch (300 mm ± 3 mm)—then the Japanese parts were all within 1/16 of an inch (1.6 mm), less variation. This made the Japanese cars run more smoothly and customers experienced fewer problems.

In his book The New Economics for Industry, Government, and Education Deming championed the work of Walter Shewhart, including statistical process control, operational definitions, and what Deming called the "Shewhart Cycle", which had evolved into Plan–Do–Study–Act (PDSA). Deming is well known for his work in Japan after WWII, particularly his work with the leaders of Japanese industry. That work began in July and August 1950, in Tokyo and at the Hakone Convention Center, when Deming delivered speeches on what he called "Statistical Product Quality Administration". Many in Japan credit Deming as one of the inspirations for what has become known as the Japanese post-war economic miracle of 1950 to 1960, when Japan rose from the ashes of war on the road to becoming the second-largest economy in the world through processes partially influenced by the ideas Deming taught:

1. Better design of products to improve service
2. Higher level of uniform product quality
3. Improvement of product testing in the workplace and in research centers
4. Greater sales through side [global] markets

Deming is best known in the United States for his 14 Points (Out of the Crisis, by W. Edwards Deming, preface) and his system of thought he called the "System of Profound Knowledge". The system includes four components or "lenses" through which to view the world simultaneously:

1. Appreciating a system
2. Understanding variation
3. Psychology
4. Epistemology, the theory of knowledge

Deming made a significant contribution to Japan's reputation for innovative, high-quality products, and for its economic power. He is regarded as having had more impact on Japanese manufacturing and business than any other individual not of Japanese heritage. Despite being honored in Japan in 1951 with the establishment of the Deming Prize, he was only just beginning to win widespread recognition in the United States at the time of his death in 1993. President Ronald Reagan awarded him the National Medal of Technology in 1987. The following year, the National Academy of Sciences gave Deming the Distinguished Career in Science award.

== Early life ==
William Edwards Deming was born in Sioux City, Iowa, but he was raised in Polk City, Iowa, on his grandfather Henry Coffin Edwards' chicken farm, then later on a 40-acre (16 ha) farm purchased by his father in Powell, Wyoming. He was the son of William Albert Deming and Pluma Irene Edwards, His parents were well-educated and emphasized the importance of education to their children. Pluma had studied in San Francisco and was a musician. William Albert had studied mathematics and law.

He was a direct descendant of John Deming, (1615–1705) an early Puritan settler and original patentee of the Connecticut Colony, and Honor Treat, the daughter of Richard Treat (1584–1669), an early New England settler, deputy to the Connecticut Legislature and also a patentee of the Royal Charter of Connecticut, 1662.

== Career ==
Deming was a professor of statistics in New York University graduate school of business administration (1946–1993) and taught at Columbia University's graduate school of business (1988–1993). He also was a consultant for private business.

In 1927, Deming was introduced to Walter A. Shewhart of the Bell Telephone Laboratories by C.H. Kunsman of the United States Department of Agriculture (USDA). Deming found great inspiration in the work of Shewhart, the originator of the concepts of statistical control of processes and the related technical tool of the control chart, as Deming began to move toward the application of statistical methods to industrial production and management. Shewhart's idea of common and special causes of variation led directly to Deming's theory of management. Deming saw that these ideas could be applied not only to manufacturing processes, but also to the processes by which enterprises are led and managed. This key insight made possible his enormous influence on the economics of the industrialized world after 1950.

In 1936, he studied under Sir Ronald Fisher and Jerzy Spława-Neyman at University College, London, England.

Deming edited a series of lectures delivered by Shewhart at USDA, Statistical Method from the Viewpoint of Quality Control, into a book published in 1939. One reason he learned so much from Shewhart, Deming remarked in a videotaped interview, was that, while brilliant, Shewhart had an "uncanny ability to make things difficult." Deming thus spent a great deal of time both copying Shewhart's ideas and devising ways to present them with his own twist.

Deming developed the sampling techniques that were used for the first time during the 1940 U.S. Census, formulating the Deming-Stephan algorithm for iterative proportional fitting in the process. During World War II, Deming was a member of the five-man Emergency Technical Committee. He worked with H.F. Dodge, A.G. Ashcroft, Leslie E. Simon, R.E. Wareham, and John Gaillard in the compilation of the American War Standards (American Standards Association Z1.1–3 published in 1942) and taught SPC techniques to workers engaged in wartime production. Statistical methods were widely applied during World War II, but faded into disuse a few years later in the face of huge overseas demand for American mass-produced products.

=== Japan ===
In 1947, Deming was involved in early planning for the 1951 Japanese census. The Allied powers were occupying Japan, and he was asked by the United States Department of the Army to assist with the census. He was brought over at the behest of General Douglas MacArthur, who grew frustrated at being frequently unable to complete phone calls without the line going dead due to Japan's shattered postwar economy. While in Japan, his expertise in quality-control techniques, combined with his involvement in Japanese society, brought him an invitation from the Union of Japanese Scientists and Engineers (JUSE).

JUSE members had studied Shewhart's techniques, and as part of Japan's reconstruction efforts, they sought an expert to teach statistical control. From June–August 1950, Deming trained hundreds of engineers, managers, and scholars in SPC and concepts of quality. He also conducted at least one session for top management (including top Japanese industrialists of the likes of Akio Morita, the cofounder of Sony Corp.) Deming's message to Japan's chief executives was that improving quality would reduce expenses, while increasing productivity and market share. Perhaps the best known of these management lectures was delivered at the Mt. Hakone Conference Center in August 1950.

A number of Japanese manufacturers applied his techniques widely and experienced heretofore unheard-of levels of quality and productivity. The improved quality combined with the lowered cost created new international demand for Japanese products.

Deming declined to receive royalties from the transcripts of his 1950 lectures, so JUSE's board of directors established the Deming Prize (December 1950) to repay him for his friendship and kindness. Within Japan, the Deming Prize continues to exert considerable influence on the disciplines of quality control and quality management.

In 1960, the Prime Minister of Japan (Nobusuke Kishi), acting on behalf of Emperor Hirohito, awarded Deming Japan's Order of the Sacred Treasure, Second Class. The citation on the medal recognizes Deming's contributions to Japan's industrial rebirth and its worldwide success. The first section of the meritorious service record describes his work in Japan:

- 1947, Rice Statistics Mission member
- 1950, assistant to the Supreme Commander of the Allied Powers
- instructor in sample survey methods in government statistics

The second half of the record lists his service to private enterprise through the introduction of epochal ideas, such as quality control and market survey techniques.

Among his many honors, an exhibit memorializing Deming's contributions and his famous Red Bead Experiment is on display outside the board room of the American Society for Quality.

He was inducted into the Automotive Hall of Fame in 1991.

== Later career ==
David Salsburg wrote:

"He was known for his kindness to and consideration for those he worked with, for his robust, if very subtle, humor, and for his interest in music. He sang in a choir, played drums and flute, and published several original pieces of sacred music."

Later, from his home in Washington, D.C., Deming continued running his own consultancy business in the United States, largely unknown and unrecognized in his country of origin and work. In 1980, he was featured prominently in an NBC TV documentary titled "If Japan Can... Why Can't We?" about the increasing industrial competition the United States was facing from Japan. As a result of the broadcast, demand for his services increased dramatically, and Deming continued consulting for industry throughout the world until his death at the age of 93.

The Ford Motor Company was one of the first American corporations to seek help from Deming. In 1981, Ford's sales were falling. Between 1979 and 1982, Ford had incurred $3 billion in losses. Ford's newly appointed Corporate Quality Director, Larry Moore, was charged with recruiting Deming to help jump-start a quality movement at Ford. Deming questioned the company's culture and the way its managers operated. To Ford's surprise, Deming talked not about quality, but about management. He told Ford that management actions were responsible for 85% of all problems in developing better cars. In 1986, Ford came out with a profitable line of cars, the Taurus-Sable line. In a letter to Autoweek, Donald Petersen, then Ford chairman, said, "We are moving toward building a quality culture at Ford and the many changes that have been taking place here have their roots directly in Deming's teachings." By 1986, Ford had become the most profitable American auto company. For the first time since the 1920s, its earnings had exceeded those of arch-rival General Motors (GM). Ford had come to lead the American automobile industry in improvements. Ford's following years' earnings confirmed that its success was not a fluke, for its earnings continued to exceed GM and Chrysler's.

In 1982, Deming's book Quality, Productivity, and Competitive Position was published by the MIT Center for Advanced Engineering, and was renamed Out of the Crisis in 1986. In it, he offers a theory of management based on his famous 14 Points for Management. Management's failure to plan for the future brings about loss of market, which brings about loss of jobs. Management must be judged not only by the quarterly dividend, but also by innovative plans to stay in business, protect investment, ensure future dividends, and provide more jobs through improved products and services. "Long-term commitment to new learning and new philosophy is required of any management that seeks transformation. The timid and the fainthearted, and the people that expect quick results, are doomed to disappointment."

In 1982, Deming, along with Paul Hertz and Howard Gitlow of the University of Miami Graduate School of Business in Coral Gables, founded the W. Edwards Deming Institute for the Improvement of Productivity and Quality. In 1983, the institute trained consultants of Ernst and Whinney Management Consultants in the Deming teachings. E&W then founded its Deming Quality Consulting Practice which is still active today.

His methods and workshops regarding total quality management have had broad influence. For example, they were used to define how the U.S. Environmental Protection Agency's Underground Storage Tanks program would work.

Over the course of his career, Deming received dozens of academic awards, including another, honorary, PhD from Oregon State University. In 1987, he was awarded the National Medal of Technology: "For his forceful promotion of statistical methodology, for his contributions to sampling theory, and for his advocacy to corporations and nations of a general management philosophy that has resulted in improved product quality." In 1988, he received the Distinguished Career in Science award from the National Academy of Sciences.

Deming continued to advise businesses large and small. From 1985 through 1989, Deming served as a consultant to Vernay Laboratories, a rubber manufacturing firm in Yellow Springs, Ohio, with fewer than 1,000 employees. He held several week-long seminars for employees and suppliers of the small company where his famous example "Workers on the Red Beads" spurred several major changes in Vernay's manufacturing processes.

Deming joined the Graduate School of Business at Columbia University in 1988. In 1990, during his last year, he founded the W. Edwards Deming Center for Quality, Productivity, and Competitiveness at Columbia Business School to promote operational excellence in business through the development of research, best practices and strategic planning.

In 1990, Marshall Industries (NYSE:MI, 1984–1999) CEO Robert Rodin trained with the then 90-year-old Deming and his colleague Nida Backaitis. Marshall Industries' dramatic transformation and growth from $400 million to $1.8 billion in sales was chronicled in Deming's last book The New Economics, a Harvard Case Study, and Rodin's book, Free, Perfect and Now.

In 1993, Deming published his final book, The New Economics for Industry, Government, Education, which included the System of Profound Knowledge and the 14 Points for Management. It also contained educational concepts involving group-based teaching without grades, as well as management without individual merit or performance reviews.

== Academic contributions ==
The philosophy of W. Edwards Deming has been summarized as follows:

Dr. W. Edwards Deming taught that by adopting appropriate principles of management, organizations can increase quality and simultaneously reduce costs (by reducing waste, rework, staff attrition and litigation while increasing customer loyalty). The key is to practice continual improvement and think of manufacturing as a system, not as bits and pieces."

=== The Deming System of Profound Knowledge ===
"The prevailing style of management must undergo transformation. A system cannot understand itself. The transformation requires a view from outside. The aim of this chapter is to provide an outside view—a lens—that I call a system of profound knowledge. It provides a map of theory by which to understand the organizations that we work in."

"The first step is transformation of the individual. This transformation is discontinuous. It comes from understanding of the system of profound knowledge. The individual, transformed, will perceive new meaning to his life, to events, to numbers, to interactions between people."

"Once the individual understands the system of profound knowledge, he will apply its principles in every kind of relationship with other people. He will have a basis for judgment of his own decisions and for transformation of the organizations that he belongs to."

Deming advocated that all managers need to have what he called a System of Profound Knowledge, consisting of four parts:

1. Appreciation of a system: understanding the overall processes involving suppliers, producers, and customers (or recipients) of goods and services (explained below);
2. Knowledge of variation: the range and causes of variation in quality, and use of statistical sampling in measurements;
3. Theory of knowledge: the concepts explaining knowledge and the limits of what can be known.
4. Knowledge of psychology: concepts of human nature.

He explained, "One need not be eminent in any part nor in all four parts in order to understand it and to apply it. The 14 points for management in industry, education, and government follow naturally as application of this outside knowledge, for transformation from the present style of Western management to one of optimization."

"The various segments of the system of profound knowledge proposed here cannot be separated. They interact with each other. Thus, knowledge of psychology is incomplete without knowledge of variation.

"A manager of people needs to understand that all people are different. This is not ranking people. He needs to understand that the performance of anyone is governed largely by the system that he works in, the responsibility of management. A psychologist that possesses even a crude understanding of variation as will be learned in the experiment with the Red Beads (Ch. 7) could no longer participate in refinement of a plan for ranking people."

The Appreciation of a system involves understanding how interactions (i.e., feedback) between the elements of a system can result in internal restrictions that force the system to behave as a single organism that automatically seeks a steady state. It is this steady state that determines the output of the system rather than the individual elements. Thus it is the structure of the organization rather than the employees, alone, which holds the key to improving the quality of output.

The Knowledge of variation involves understanding that everything measured consists of both "normal" variation due to the flexibility of the system and of "special causes" that create defects. Quality involves recognizing the difference to eliminate "special causes" while controlling normal variation. Deming taught that making changes in response to "normal" variation would only make the system perform worse. Understanding variation includes the mathematical certainty that variation will normally occur within six standard deviations of the mean.

The System of Profound Knowledge is the basis for application of Deming's famous 14 Points for Management, described below.

=== Key principles ===
Deming offered 14 key principles to managers for transforming business effectiveness. The points were first presented in his book Out of the Crisis (p. 23–24). Although Deming does not use the term in his book, it is credited with launching the Total Quality Management movement.

1. Create constancy of purpose toward improvement of product and service, with the aim to become competitive, to stay in business and to provide jobs.
2. Adopt the new philosophy. We are in a new economic age. Western management must awaken to the challenge, must learn their responsibilities, and take on leadership for change.
3. Cease dependence on inspection to achieve quality. Eliminate the need for massive inspection by building quality into the product in the first place.
4. End the practice of awarding business on the basis of a price tag. Instead, minimize total cost. Move towards a single supplier for any one item, on a long-term relationship of loyalty and trust.
5. Improve constantly and forever the system of production and service, to improve quality and productivity, and thus constantly decrease costs.
6. Institute training on the job.
7. Institute leadership (see Point 12 and Ch. 8 of Out of the Crisis). The aim of supervision should be to help people and machines and gadgets do a better job. Supervision of management is in need of overhaul, as well as supervision of production workers.
8. Drive out fear, so that everyone may work effectively for the company. (See Ch. 3 of Out of the Crisis)
9. Break down barriers between departments. People in research, design, sales, and production must work as a team, to foresee problems of production and usage that may be encountered with the product or service.
10. Eliminate slogans, exhortations, and targets for the work force asking for zero defects and new levels of productivity. Such exhortations only create adversarial relationships, as the bulk of the causes of low quality and low productivity belong to the system and thus lie beyond the power of the work force.
  1. Eliminate work standards (quotas) on the factory floor. Substitute with leadership.
  2. Eliminate management by objective. Eliminate management by numbers and numerical goals. Instead substitute with leadership.
11. Remove barriers that rob the hourly worker of his right to pride of workmanship. The responsibility of supervisors must be changed from sheer numbers to quality.
12. Remove barriers that rob people in management and in engineering of their right to pride of workmanship. This means, inter alia, abolishment of the annual or merit rating and of management by objectives (See Ch. 3 of Out of the Crisis).
13. Institute a vigorous program of education and self-improvement.
14. Put everybody in the company to work to accomplish the transformation. The transformation is everybody's job.

"Massive training is required to instill the courage to break with tradition. Every activity and every job is a part of the process."

==== PDCA myth ====
Plan–Do–Check–Act (PDCA) is widely miscredited to Deming. Deming always referred to the Cycle as the Shewhart Cycle for Continuous Learning and Improvement.

In the article on "Clearing up myths about the Deming cycle and seeing how it keeps evolving", by Ron Moen and Clifford Norman, the authors place the origins of PDCA in the work of Galileo on designed experiments and Francis Bacon's work on inductive learning, which gave rise to the basic scientific method – making a hypothesis, conducting an experiment, examining the hypothesis in the light of experimental results. This central process seems to have inspired C I Lewis and through him Shewhart.

Deming credits a 1939 work by Shewhart for the idea and over time eventually developed the Plan–Do–Study–Act (PDSA) cycle, which has the idea of deductive and inductive learning built into the learning and improvement cycle. Deming finally published the PDSA cycle in 1993, in The New Economics on p. 132.

=== Seven Deadly Diseases ===
The "Seven Deadly Diseases" are:

1. Lack of constancy of purpose
2. Emphasis on short-term profits
3. Evaluation by performance, merit rating, or annual review of performance
4. Mobility of management
5. Running a company on visible figures alone
6. Excessive medical costs
7. Excessive costs of warranty, fueled by lawyers who work for contingency fees

"A Lesser Category of Obstacles" includes:

1. Neglecting long-range planning
2. Relying on technology to solve problems
3. Seeking examples to follow rather than developing solutions
4. Excuses, such as "our problems are different"
5. The mistaken belief that management skills can be taught in classes
6. Reliance on quality control departments rather than management, supervisors, managers of purchasing, and production workers
7. Placing blame on workforces who are responsible for only 15% of mistakes while the system designed by management is responsible for 85% of the unintended consequences
8. Relying on quality inspection rather than improving product quality

Deming's advocacy of the Plan–Do–Study–Act cycle, his 14 Points and Seven Deadly Diseases have had tremendous influence outside manufacturing and have been applied in other arenas, such as in the relatively new field of sales process engineering.

=== Analysis of enzyme kinetic data ===
Deming's collaboration with Hans Lineweaver and Dean Burk is possibly the least known of his work as a statistician, but it is relevant to what has become the most highly cited paper ever published in the Journal of the American Chemical Society, which was written after the authors had consulted Deming about the proper way to analyze their data. Although they are credited with the introduction of the double-reciprocal plot, in which the reciprocal rate is plotted against the reciprocal substrate concentration, they estimated the kinetic parameters by weighted linear regression with weights of the fourth power of the rates, as recommended by Deming. Unfortunately this (essential) part of their approach was quickly forgotten.

== Personal life ==
Deming married Agnes Bell in 1922. She died in 1930, a little more than a year after they had adopted a daughter, Dorothy (died 1984). Deming made use of various private homes to help raise the infant, and following his marriage in 1932 to Lola Elizabeth Shupe (died 1986), with whom he coauthored several papers, he brought her back home to stay. Lola and he had two more children, Diana (born 1934) and Linda (born 1943). Deming was survived by Diana and Linda, along with seven grandchildren.

== Death ==
Deming died in his sleep at the age of 93 in his Washington home from cancer on December 20, 1993. When asked, toward the end of his life, how he would wish to be remembered in the U.S., he replied, "I probably won't even be remembered." After a pause, he added, "Well, maybe ... as someone who spent his life trying to keep America from committing suicide."

== Works ==
- Deming, W. Edwards (1964) [1943]. Statistical Adjustment of Data. Dover. LCCN 64-24416. ISBN 0-486-64685-8.
- Deming, W. Edwards (1966) [1950]. Some Theory of Sampling. Dover. ISBN 0-486-64684-X. LCCN 66-30538.
- Deming, W. Edwards; Massachusetts Institute of Technology. Center for Advanced Engineering Study (1982). Quality, Productivity, and Competitive Position. Massachusetts Institute of Technology, Center for Advanced Engineering Study. ISBN 978-0-911379-00-6.
- Deming, W. Edwards (2000). The New Economics: For Industry, Government, Education. MIT Press. ISBN 978-0-262-54116-9.
- Deming, W. Edwards (2012). The Essential Deming: Leadership Principles from the Father of Quality. McGraw Hill Professional. ISBN 978-0-07-179021-5.
- Deming, W. Edwards (2018). Out of the Crisis, reissue. MIT Press. ISBN 978-0-262-35003-7.

== See also ==
- Analytic and enumerative statistical studies
- C. I. Lewis
- Common cause and special cause
- Continual improvement process
- Epistemology
- Genichi Taguchi
- Joseph M. Juran
- Kaizen
- Maestro concept
- Shewhart cycle
- Homer Sarasohn
- Toyota Production System
