= Management by objectives =

Defining and tackling organization goals

Management by objectives (MBO), also known as management by planning (MBP), is a management style involving the defining of specific objectives within an organization and subsequent deciding how to achieve each objective in sequence. It was first popularized by Peter Drucker in his 1954 book The Practice of Management. In this system of management, individual goals are synchronized with the goals of the organization, with employee performance being measured and compared with set standards. According to MBO theory, when employees themselves have been involved with the goal-setting and choosing the course of action to be followed by them, they are more likely to fulfill their responsibilities.

According to George S. Odiorne, the system of management by objectives can be described as a process whereby the superior and subordinate jointly identify common goals, define each individual's major areas of responsibility in terms of expected results, and use these measures as guides for operating the unit and assessing the contribution of each of its members.

== History ==
Peter Drucker first used the term "management by objectives" in his 1954 book The Practice of Management. While the basic ideas of MBO were not original to Drucker, he pulled from other management practices to create a complete system. MBO draws on Mary Parker Follett's 1926 essay, The Giving of Orders. Drucker's student, George Odiorne, continued to develop the idea in his book Management Decisions by Objectives, published in the mid-1960s. MBO was popularized by companies like Hewlett-Packard, which claimed it led to their success. While the practice is used today, it may go by different names.

The most recent research focuses on specific industries, specifying the practice of MBO for each.

== Framework ==
Management by objectives is the process of supervisors attempting to manage their subordinates by introducing a set of specific goals that both the employee and the company strive to achieve in the near future, and working to meet those goals accordingly. In the MBO paradigm, managers determine the enterprise's mission and strategic goals based on an analysis of what can and should be accomplished by the organization within a specific period of time. The functions of these managers can be centralized by appointing a project manager who can monitor and control the activities of the various departments. If this cannot be done or is not desirable, each manager's contributions to the organizational goal is spelled out . The five steps of MBO comprise:

1. Review organizational goals
2. Set worker objectives
3. Monitor progress
4. Evaluation
5. Give rewards

== Application ==
Many other corporations praise the effectiveness of MBO, including Xerox, DuPont, Intel. In many large Japanese corporations, beginning in the late 1990s, MBO was used as the basis of "the performance-based merit system” (seika-shugi) which used clear numerical targets to measure performance in contrast to the previous system of non-specific contracts in Japanese companies. MBO implementations often use management information systems to establish relevant objectives and monitor their "reach ratio" objectively.

== Limitations ==
W. Edwards Deming argued that a lack of understanding of systems commonly results in the misapplication of objectives. Deming also stated that setting production targets will encourage workers to meet those targets through whatever means necessary, which usually results in poor quality. Point 7 of Deming's key principles encourages managers to abandon objectives in favour of leadership because he felt that a leader with an understanding of systems was more likely to guide workers to an appropriate solution than the incentive of an objective. Deming also pointed out that Drucker warned managers that a systemic view was required, but he felt that Drucker's warning went largely unheeded by the practitioners of MBO.

In a 1991 comprehensive review of thirty years of research on the impact of MBO, Robert Rodgers and John Hunter concluded that companies whose CEOs demonstrated high commitment to MBO showed, on average, a 56% gain in productivity. Companies with CEOs who showed low commitment saw only a 6% gain in productivity.

The limitations mentioned above, combined with the challenges faced by modern service companies, have led to the development of methods that integrate aspects of MBO but appear to be significantly more effective in application. These include, for example, the objectives and key results (OKR) method, which was developed by John Doerr (among others) and has been used successfully in many companies, notably at Google. Agile management techniques also have a strong emphasis on goals. The group of management techniques that are based on goals, with a strong focus on engagement, team motivation and leadership, can be summarized as Management by Goals methods.

== See also ==
- Decision-making software
- The HP Way
- Objectives, goals, strategy, measure (OGSM)
