= Mary Parker Follett =

American management consultant, social worker and philosopher (1868-1933)

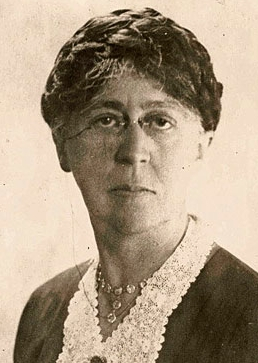
- Born: 3 September 1868; Quincy, Massachusetts, U.S.
- Died: 18 December 1933 (aged 65); Boston, Massachusetts, U.S.
- Occupations: Social worker turned management theorist and consultant, political theorist, philosopher, and writer
- Writing career
- Genre: Non-fiction
- Subjects: Management, Politics, Philosophy
- Website: follettfdn.org

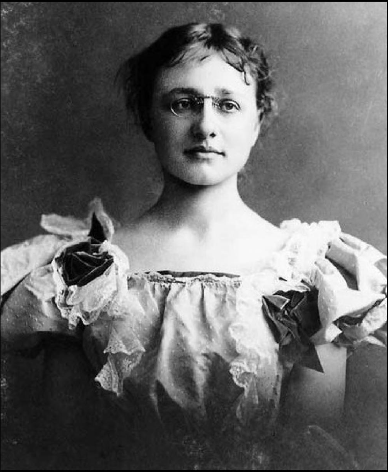
Follett, at her graduation from Radcliffe

Mary Parker Follett (3 September 1868 – 18 December 1933) was an American social thinker, management consultant, social worker, political scientist, philosopher and pioneer in the fields of organizational theory and organizational behavior, management, leadership, democracy, and conflict resolution. She has been called the "Mother of Modern Management". Instead of emphasizing industrial and mechanical components, she advocated for what she saw as the far more important human element, regarding people as the most valuable element present within any organization. She was one of the first theorists to actively write about and explore the role people had in ineffective management and discuss the importance of learning to deal with and promote positive human relations as a fundamental aspect of the industrial sector. She is also recognized as the originator of "win-win" approaches to conflict resolution.

== Life ==
Follett was born in 1868 in Quincy, Massachusetts. Her family was composed of Charles Allen Follett, a machinist in a local shoe factory, and Elizabeth Curtis (née Baxter) Follett, respectively of English-Scottish and Welsh descent, and a younger brother. Her mother's poor health and father's death left her to assume the role of head of the household in her teen years. Follett attended Thayer Academy, a collegiate preparatory day school in Braintree, Massachusetts, and spent much of her free time caring for her disabled mother. In September 1885 she enrolled in Anna Ticknor's Society to Encourage Studies at Home.

From 1890 to 1891, she studied at the University of Cambridge and then moved to study at Society for the Collegiate Instruction of Women in Cambridge, Massachusetts (known also as the "Harvard Annex" and later as Radcliffe College). For the next six years, Follett attended the university on an irregular basis, eventually graduating summa cum laude in 1898 with emphases in government, economics, law, and philosophy. Her Radcliffe thesis, The Speaker of the House of Representatives, was published in 1896 and lauded in a review by Theodore Roosevelt as the best work ever written on the subject.

Following Follett's time at Radcliffe, Follett worked with settlement houses in the Boston area and led the movement to use schools as evening community centers. Her experiences with human relations in the community, combined with her expansive exposure to ideas in law, psychology, history, and other disciplines, led to the insights that she shared in her groundbreaking work on democracy, The New State, which was first published in 1918. This was followed by publication of her second major work, Creative Experience, in 1924. This work focused on human relations and built on then-recent insights from psychology and other fields, but also addressed democracy, leadership, and law. It also establishes Follett as one of the first "systems thinkers" of the modern era.

In the 1920s, Follett found a passionate audience in the world of industry and labor relations, and she lectured and advised in these areas on both sides of the Atlantic. She was one of the first women ever invited to address the London School of Economics, where she spoke on cutting-edge management issues. Follett was fluent in both German and French and used her linguistic abilities to keep herself knowledgeable about progress in all fields in Europe.

On the personal side of her life, in the 1890s, Follett met Isobel L. Briggs, with whom she maintained a committed relationship for over thirty years. The two lived together, dividing their time between Beacon Hill, Massachusetts, and a summer home they owned in Putney, Vermont. Following Briggs' death, and during the last several years of Follett's life, she maintained a close relationship with Dame Katharine Furse, a British former nursing and military administrator.

Follett died of an illness in 1933 in Boston, Massachusetts.

== Ideas and influences ==
Follett's educational and work background would shape and influence her future theories and writings. Early mentors included Anna Boynton Thompson at Thayer Academy and her Harvard advisor Albert Bushnell Hart. One of her earliest career positions would see her working as a social worker in the Roxbury neighborhood of Boston from 1900 to 1908. During this period her interactions with the Roxbury community would lead her to realize the importance of community spaces as areas to meet and socialize.

Her experience in developing vocational guidance and evening programs in public schools, she would develop what would be her life's work and her theories in group dynamics. "The New State," her second writing published in 1918, would evolve from a report into her second published work. This publication would go on to lay the foundational theories for her most important theories and become a major center of attention of her career.

By participating in local recreational, educational, and advocacy groups, Follett developed her ideals of participatory democracy and her ideals of society as "integrative." Observing people led Follett to believe that the boundaries of a person's identities are porous, affected by the society around them, which, in turn, is affected by the identities of the people within it. Thus the self and the society, according to Follett, are in a cycle in which they constantly help to create one another.

=== Organizational theory ===
In her capacity as a management theorist, Follett pioneered the understanding of lateral processes within hierarchical organizations (their recognition led directly to the formation of matrix-style organizations, the first of which was DuPont, in the 1920s), the importance of informal processes within organizations, and the idea of the "authority of expertise," which really served to modify the typology of authority developed by her German contemporary, Max Weber, who broke authority down into three separate categories: rational-legal, traditional and charismatic.

She recognized the holistic nature of community and advanced the idea of "reciprocal relationships" in understanding the dynamic aspects of the individual in relationship to others. Follett advocated the principle of "integration," a term she used for the interaction of different perspectives and ideas in the face of a common situation. Related to integration was her view on power as being a creative potential, exemplified in her emphasis on "power-with" rather than "power-over."

Follett did not subscribe wholly to the common managerial ideation of the time period which presumed that while managers were able to use reason and logic, their subordinates were instead focused on sentimentality. Follett believed that all people, regardless of their identification or role acted based on the treatment they received. She believed that managers did not need to manipulate subordinates to get desired behavior but instead could train them to be empowered thinkers capable of creating desired results on their own accord. Follett believed that leadership, while a constant part of the business relationship, was more fluid. Leadership, Follett posited, was not always tied to a role but often to the person with the most knowledge or experience in the area.

Follett contributed greatly to the win-win philosophy, coining the term in her work with groups. Her approach to conflict was to embrace it as a mechanism of diversity and an opportunity to develop integrated solutions rather than simply compromising. Follett viewed conflict as a way to further communicate and seek mutual understanding. Conflict, instead of being a means of turmoil within a management relationship presented an opportunity to strengthen the relationship. Her ideas on conflict resolution were new and innovative at the time. She was also a pioneer in the establishment of community centers.

=== Writings ===
Follett's unique background often led her to take positions on major issues that mediated between the conventional viewpoints. In The New State, she took the position on societal change that:

It is a mistake to think that social progress is to depend upon anything happening to the working people: some say that they are to be given more material goods and all will be well; some think they are to be given more "education" and the world will be saved. It is equally a mistake to think that what we need is the conversion to "unselfishness" of the capitalist class.

Likewise, her position on the labor movement was as follows:

Neither working for someone nor paying someone's wages ought to give you power over them.

=== Transformational leadership ===
Ann Pawelec Deschenes (1998) found obscure reference pointing to Mary Parker Follett having coined the term "transformational leadership". She quotes from Edith A. Rusch's The Social Construction of Leadership: From Theory to Praxis (1991):

...writings and lectures by Mary Parker Follett from as early as 1927 contained references to transformational leadership, the interrelationship of leadership and followership, and the power of collective goals of leaders and followers (p. 8).

From The Collected Papers of Mary Parker Follett (p. 247):

"Moreover, we have now to lay somewhat less stress than formerly on this matter of the leader influencing his group because we now think of the leader as also being influenced by his group."

== Influence ==
Although most of Follett's writings remained known in very limited circles until the publication of Pauline Graham's Mary Parker Follett: Prophet of Management in 1995, her ideas had gained great influence after Chester Barnard, a New Jersey Bell executive and advisor to President Franklin D. Roosevelt, published his seminal treatment of executive management, The Functions of the Executive. Barnard's work, which stressed the critical role of "soft" factors such as "communication" and "informal processes" in organizations, owed a telling but undisclosed debt to Follett's thought and writings. Her emphasis on such soft factors paralleled the work of Elton Mayo at Western Electric's Hawthorne Plant, and presaged the rise of the human relations movement, as developed through the work of such figures as Abraham Maslow, Kurt Lewin, Douglas McGregor, Chris Argyris and other breakthrough contributors to the field of organizational development or "OD".

Her influence can also be seen indirectly perhaps in the work of Ron Lippitt, Ken Benne, Lee Bradford, Edie Seashore and others at the National Training Laboratories in Bethel, Maine, where T-Group methodology was first theorized and developed. Follett's work set the stage for a generation of effective, progressive changes in management philosophy, style, and practice, revolutionizing and humanizing the American workplace and allowing the fulfillment of Douglas McGregor's management vision of quantum leaps in productivity effected through the humanization of the workplace. It has been argued that she is partly responsible for the corporate appropriation of the idea of community and that the concept now serves the interests of profit. Follett's concepts on leadership and human relations have been cited recently by leadership expert Brené Brown.

== Legacy ==
After her death, her work and ideas would disappear from American organizational and management circles of the time but continue to gain followership in Great Britain. During the 1960s, her ideas would re-emerge in Japan, where management thinkers would apply her theories to business.

Management theorist Warren Bennis said of Follett's work, "Just about everything written today about leadership and organizations comes from Mary Parker Follett's writings and lectures."

Her texts outline modern ideas under participatory management: decentralized decisions, integrating role of groups, and competition authority. Follett managed to reduce the gap between the mechanistic approach and contemporary approach that emphasizes human behavior.

Her advocacy for schools to be used after hours for recreational and vocational use affected the Boston area, where schools opened their doors after hours for such uses, and community centers were built where schools were not located, which was a revolutionary concept during the 20th century. Her experience working in that area taught her a lot about notions of democracy and led her to write more for a wider audience, particularly the business world. She believed that good practice in business would have a significant impact on other institutions.

Follett's legacy has been recognized by the establishment of several awards in her name. These include the annual Mary Parker Follett Award for the outstanding paper to appear each year in Accounting, Auditing & Accountability Journal. The award citation states that it is named "in memory of a pioneering woman in the field of management and accountability literature who was international and interdisciplinary in her approach."

In the early 2000s, the Mary Parker Follett Foundation was established and organized the first conference named after Follett. A new organization by the same name was established in 2025, with a mission focused on "advancing democracy as a creative experience" as well as "to promote the literary and intellectual legacy of Mary Parker Follett."

== Publications ==
Follett authored a number of books and numerous essays, articles, and speeches on democracy, human relations, political philosophy, psychology, organizational behavior, and conflict resolution.

- The Speaker of the House of Representatives (1896)
- The New State (1918)
- Creative Experience (1924)
- Dynamic Administration: The Collected Papers of Mary Parker Follett (1942) (a collection of speeches and short articles was published posthumously)
