= Marriage =

Culturally recognised union between people

The symbol for marriage, often used in genealogy

Marriage, also called matrimony or wedlock, is a culturally and often legally recognised union between people called spouses. It establishes rights and obligations between them, as well as between them and their children (if any), and between them and their in-laws. It is nearly a cultural universal, but the definition of marriage varies between cultures and religions, and over time. Typically, it is an institution in which interpersonal relationships, usually sexual, are acknowledged or sanctioned. In some cultures, marriage is recommended or considered to be compulsory before pursuing sexual activity, and sexual intercourse with others aside from one's spouse may be considered immoral or even illegal in some jurisdictions. A marriage ceremony is called a wedding, while a private marriage is sometimes called an elopement.

Marriage takes many forms, depending on cultural and religious values of the people involved and the cultural expectations of the society in which they are living. Marriage may be recognized by a state, an organization, a religious authority, a tribal group, a local community, or peers. It is often viewed as a legal contract. Around the world, there has been a general trend towards ensuring equal rights for women in marriages with men, and greater tolerance towards interethnic, interracial, interfaith, interdenominational, interclass, intercommunity, transnational, and same-sex couples. Debates persist regarding the legal status of married women, leniency towards violence within marriage, customs such as dowry and bride price, marriageable age, and criminalization of premarital and extramarital sex.

== Etymology ==
The word marriage appeared around 1300 and is borrowed from Old French mariage (12th century), ultimately tracing to the Latin maritātus 'married', past participle of maritāre 'to marry'. The adjective marītus, -a, -um 'matrimonial, nuptial' could also be used, through nominalization, in the masculine form as a noun for 'husband' and in the feminine form for 'wife'. The related word matrimony is borrowed from the Old French word matremoine, which appears around 1300 CE and is in turn ultimately a learned borrowing from Latin mātrimōnium, which is derived from māter 'mother' with the suffix -mōnium for an action, state, or condition.

== Definitions ==
Anthropologists have proposed several competing definitions of marriage in an attempt to encompass the wide variety of marital practices observed across cultures. Even within Western culture, "definitions of marriage have careened from one extreme to another and everywhere in between" (as Evan Gerstmann has put it).

=== Relation recognized by custom or law ===
In The History of Human Marriage (1891), Edvard Westermarck defined marriage as "a more or less durable connection between male and female lasting beyond the mere act of propagation till after the birth of the offspring." In The Future of Marriage in Western Civilization (1936), he rejected his earlier definition, instead provisionally defining marriage as "a relation of one or more men to one or more women that is recognized by custom or law".

=== Legitimacy of offspring ===
The anthropological handbook Notes and Queries (1951) defined marriage as "a union between a man and a woman such that children born to the woman are the recognized legitimate offspring of both partners." In recognition of a practice by the Nuer people of Sudan allowing women to act as a husband in certain circumstances (the ghost marriage), Kathleen Gough suggested modifying this to "a woman and one or more other persons."

In an analysis of marriage among the Nayar, a polyandrous society in India, Gough found that the conventional "husband" role was divided between a non-resident "social father" of the woman's children and her lovers. None of these men had legal rights to the woman's child. This forced Gough to disregard sexual access as a key element of marriage and to define it in terms of legitimacy of offspring alone.

Economic anthropologist Duran Bell has criticized the legitimacy-based definition on the basis that some societies do not require marriage for legitimacy. He argued that a legitimacy-based definition of marriage is circular in societies where illegitimacy has no other legal or social implications for a child other than the mother being unmarried.

=== Collection of rights ===
Edmund Leach criticized Gough's definition for being too restrictive in terms of recognized legitimate offspring and suggested that marriage be viewed in terms of the different types of rights it serves to establish. In a 1955 article in Man, Leach argued that no one definition of marriage applied to all cultures. He offered a list of ten rights associated with marriage, including sexual monopoly and rights with respect to children, with specific rights differing across cultures. Those rights, according to Leach, included:

1. "To establish a legal father of a woman's children.
2. To establish a legal mother of a man's children.
3. To give the husband a monopoly in the wife's sexuality.
4. To give the wife a monopoly in the husband's sexuality.
5. To give the husband partial or monopolistic rights to the wife's domestic and other labor services.
6. To give the wife partial or monopolistic rights to the husband's domestic and other labor services.
7. To give the husband partial or total control over property belonging or potentially accruing to the wife.
8. To give the wife partial or total control over property belonging or potentially accruing to the husband.
9. To establish a joint fund of property – a partnership – for the benefit of the children of the marriage.
10. To establish a socially significant 'relationship of affinity' between the husband and his wife's brothers."

The monopoly on sexuality generally does not include the right to sexual access, which in many countries is viewed as marital rape.

== Types ==
=== Monogamy ===
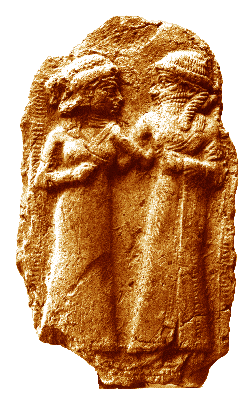
Ancient Sumerian depiction of the marriage of Inanna and Dumuzid

Monogamy is a form of marriage in which an individual has only one spouse during their lifetime or at any one time. Monogamy may or may not indicate that the spouses have pledged not to have sexual relationships outside of their marriage.

Anthropologist Jack Goody's comparative study of marriage around the world utilizing the Ethnographic Atlas found a strong correlation between intensive plough agriculture, dowry and monogamy. This pattern was found in a broad swath of Eurasian societies from Japan to Ireland. The majority of Sub-Saharan African societies that practice extensive hoe agriculture, in contrast, show a correlation between "bride price" and polygamy. A further study drawing on the Ethnographic Atlas showed a statistical correlation between increasing size of the society, the belief in "high gods" to support human morality, and monogamy.

In the countries which do not permit polygamy, a person who marries in one of those countries a person while still being lawfully married to another commits the crime of bigamy. In all cases, the second marriage is considered legally null and void. Besides the second and subsequent marriages being void, the bigamist is also liable to other penalties, which also vary between jurisdictions.

==== Serial monogamy ====
Governments that support monogamy may allow easy divorce. Those who remarry after a divorce do so usually no more than three times. Divorce and remarriage can thus result in "serial monogamy", i.e. having multiple marriages but only one legal spouse at a time. This can be interpreted as a form of plural mating, as are those societies dominated by female-headed families in the Caribbean, Mauritius and Brazil where there is frequent rotation of unmarried partners. In all, these account for 16 to 24% of the "monogamous" category.

Serial monogamy creates a new kind of relative, the "ex-". The "ex-wife", for example, may remain an active part of her "ex-husband's" or "ex-wife's" life, as they may be tied together by transfers of resources (alimony, child support), or shared child custody.

=== Polygamy ===
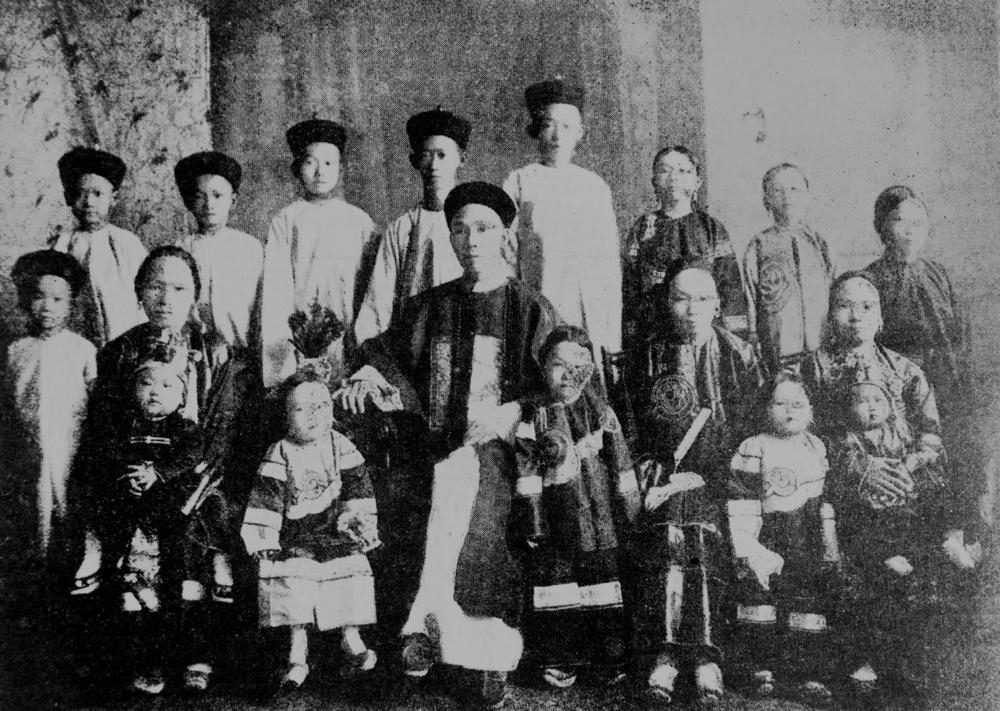
Chinese immigrant with his three wives and fourteen children, Cairns, 1904

Polygamy is a marriage which includes more than two spouses. When a man is married to more than one wife at a time, the relationship is called polygyny, and there is no marriage bond between the wives; and when a woman is married to more than one husband at a time, it is called polyandry, and there is no marriage bond between the husbands. If a marriage includes multiple husbands or wives, it can be called group marriage.

A molecular genetic study of global human genetic diversity argued that sexual polygyny was typical of human reproductive patterns until the shift to sedentary farming communities approximately 10,000 to 5,000 years ago in Europe and Asia, and more recently in Africa and the Americas. As noted above, Anthropologist Jack Goody's comparative study of marriage around the world utilizing the Ethnographic Atlas found that the majority of Sub-Saharan African societies that practice extensive hoe agriculture show a correlation between "Bride price" and polygamy. A survey of other cross-cultural samples has confirmed that the absence of the plough was the only predictor of polygamy, although other factors such as high male mortality in warfare (in non-state societies) and pathogen stress (in state societies) had some impact.

Marriages are classified according to the number of legal spouses an individual has. The suffix "-gamy" refers specifically to the number of spouses, as in bi-gamy (two spouses, generally illegal in most nations), and poly-gamy (more than one spouse).

Societies show variable acceptance of polygamy as a cultural ideal and practice. According to the Ethnographic Atlas, of 1,231 societies noted, 186 were monogamous; 453 had occasional polygyny; 588 had more frequent polygyny, and 4 had polyandry. However, as Miriam Zeitzen writes, social tolerance for polygamy is different from the practice of polygamy, since it requires wealth to establish multiple households for multiple wives. The actual prevalence of polygamy in a tolerant society may be low, with the majority of people practicing monogamous marriage. Tracking the occurrence of polygamy is further complicated in jurisdictions where it has been banned, but continues to be practiced (de facto polygamy).

Zeitzen also notes that Western perceptions of African society and marriage patterns are biased by "contradictory concerns of nostalgia for traditional African culture versus critique of polygamy as oppressive to women or detrimental to development." Polygamy has been condemned as being a form of human rights abuse by the United Nations Human Rights Committee, with concerns arising over domestic abuse, forced marriage, and neglect. The vast majority of countries do not permit polygamy.

==== Polygyny ====
Polygyny usually grants wives equal status, although the husband may have personal preferences. One type of de facto polygyny is concubinage, where only one woman gets a wife's rights and status, while other women remain legal house mistresses.

Although a society may be classified as polygynous, not all marriages in it necessarily are; monogamous marriages may in fact predominate. It is to this flexibility that Anthropologist Robin Fox attributes its success as a social support system:

This has often meant – given the imbalance in the sex ratios, the higher male infant mortality, the shorter life span of males, the loss of males in wartime, etc. – that often women were left without financial support from husbands. To correct this condition, females had to be killed at birth, remain single, become prostitutes, or be siphoned off into celibate religious orders. Polygynous systems have the advantage that they can promise, as did the Mormons, a home and family for every woman.

Nonetheless, polygyny is a gender issue which offers men asymmetrical benefits. In some cases, there is a large age discrepancy (as much as a generation) between a man and his youngest wife, compounding the power differential between the two. Tensions not only exist between genders, but also within genders; senior and junior men compete for wives, and senior and junior wives in the same household may experience radically different life conditions, and internal hierarchy. Several studies have suggested that the wive's relationship with other women, including co-wives and husband's female kin, are more critical relationships than that with her husband for her productive, reproductive and personal achievement. In some societies, the co-wives are relatives, usually sisters, a practice called sororal polygyny; the pre-existing relationship between the co-wives is thought to decrease potential tensions within the marriage.

Fox argues that "the major difference between polygyny and monogamy could be stated thus: while plural mating occurs in both systems, under polygyny several unions may be recognized as being legal marriages while under monogamy only one of the unions is so recognized. Often, however, it is difficult to draw a hard and fast line between the two."

As polygamy in Africa is increasingly subject to legal limitations, a variant form of de facto (as opposed to legal or de jure) polygyny is being practiced in urban centers. Although it does not involve multiple (now illegal) formal marriages, the domestic and personal arrangements follow old polygynous patterns. The de facto form of polygyny is found in other parts of the world as well (including some Mormon sects and Muslim families in the United States). In some societies such as the Lovedu of South Africa, or the Nuer of the Sudan, aristocratic women may become female 'husbands.' In the Lovedu case, this female husband may take a number of polygamous wives. This is not a lesbian relationship, but a means of legitimately expanding a royal lineage by attaching these wives' children to it. The relationships are considered polygynous, not polyandrous, because the female husband is in fact assuming masculine gendered political roles.

Religious groups have differing views on the legitimacy of polygyny. It is allowed in Islam and Confucianism. Judaism and Christianity have mentioned practices involving polygyny in the past, however, outright religious acceptance of such practices was not addressed until its rejection in later passages. They do explicitly prohibit polygny today.

==== Polyandry ====
Polyandry is notably more rare than polygyny, though less rare than the figure commonly cited in the Ethnographic Atlas (1980) which listed only those polyandrous societies found in the Himalayan Mountains. More recent studies have found 53 societies outside the 28 found in the Himalayans which practice polyandry. It is most common in egalitarian societies marked by high male mortality or male absenteeism. It is associated with partible paternity, the cultural belief that a child can have more than one father.

The explanation for polyandry in the Himalayan Mountains is related to the scarcity of land; the marriage of all brothers in a family to the same wife (fraternal polyandry) allows family land to remain intact and undivided. If every brother married separately and had children, family land would be split into unsustainable small plots. In Europe, this was prevented through the social practice of impartible inheritance (the dis-inheriting of most siblings, some of whom went on to become celibate monks and priests).

==== Plural marriage ====
Group marriage (also known as multi-lateral marriage) is a form of polyamory in which more than two persons form a family unit, with all the members of the group marriage being considered to be married to all the other members of the group marriage, and all members of the marriage share parental responsibility for any children arising from the marriage. No country legally condones group marriages, neither under the law nor as a common law marriage, but historically it has been practiced by some cultures of Polynesia, Asia, Papua New Guinea and the Americas – as well as in some intentional communities and alternative subcultures such as the Oneida Perfectionists in up-state New York. Of the 250 societies reported by the American anthropologist George Murdock in 1949, only the Kaingang of Brazil had any group marriages at all.

=== Child marriage ===
A child marriage is a marriage where one or both spouses are under the age of 18. It is related to child betrothal and teenage pregnancy.

Child marriage was common throughout history. In 1880 in the United States, the minimum age of consent for marriage ranged from 7 to 12 years old. Today it is condemned by international human rights organizations. Child marriages are often arranged between the families of the future bride and groom, sometimes as soon as the girl is born. However, in the late 1800s in England and the United States, feminist activists began calling for raised age of consent laws, which was eventually handled in the 1920s, having been raised to 16–18. As of 2026, child marriage is legal in 33 US states, with three states lacking an explicit minimum age for entering into marriage.

Child marriages can also occur in the context of bride kidnapping.

While child marriage is observed for both boys and girls, the overwhelming majority of child spouses are girls. In many cases, only one marriage-partner is a child, usually the female, due to the importance placed upon female virginity. Causes of child marriage include poverty, bride price, dowry, laws that allow child marriages, religious and social pressures, regional customs, fear of remaining unmarried, and perceived inability of women to work for money.

Today, child marriages are widespread in parts of the world; being most common in South Asia and sub-Saharan Africa, with more than half of the girls in some countries in those regions being married before 18. The incidence of child marriage has been falling in most parts of the world. In developed countries, child marriage is outlawed or restricted.

Girls who marry before 18 are at greater risk of becoming victims of domestic violence, than those who marry later, especially when they are married to a much older man.

=== Same-sex and third-gender marriages ===
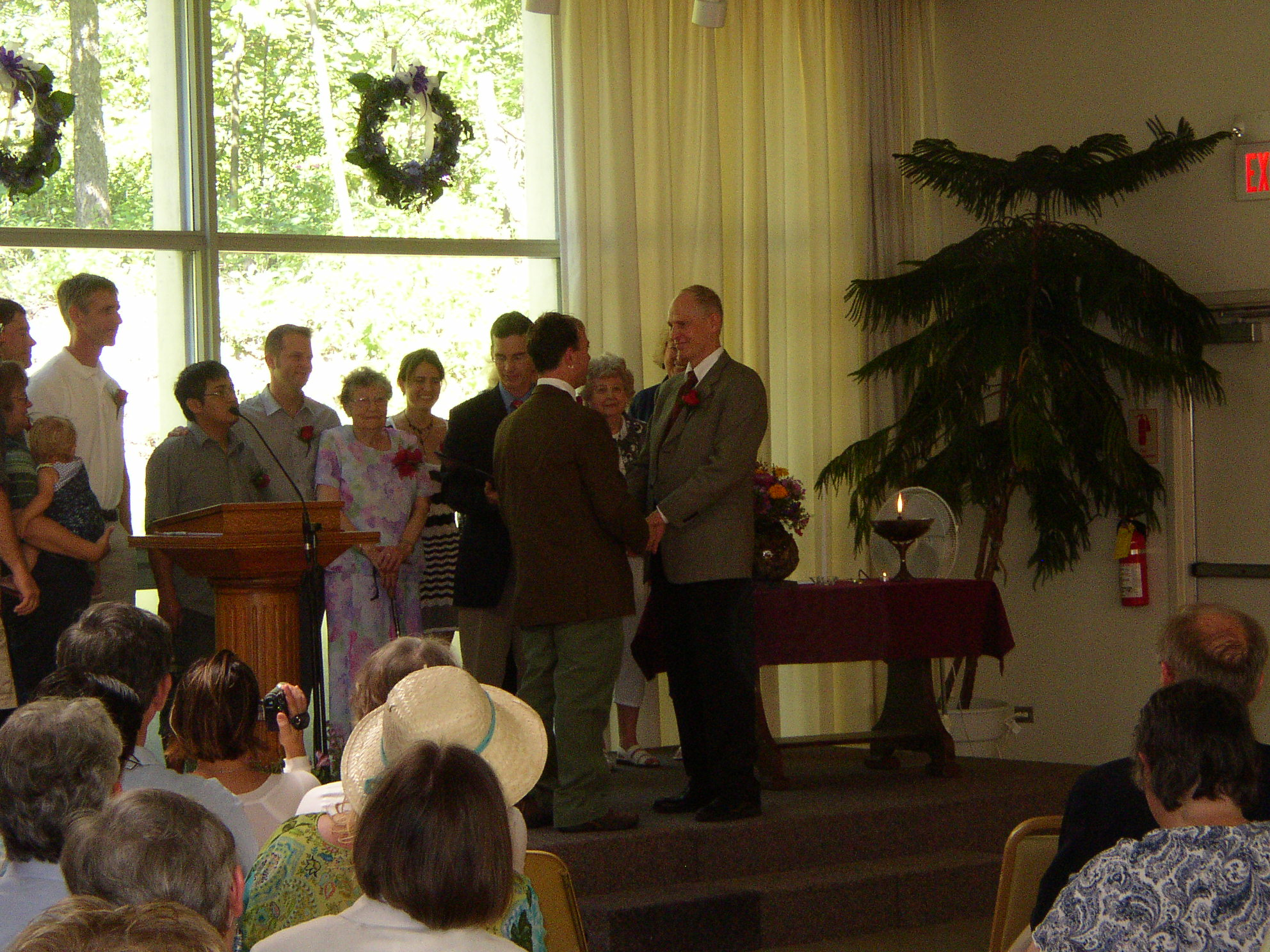
A same-sex couple exchanging wedding vows in a Unitarian Universalist Fellowship

Several kinds of same-sex marriages have been documented in Indigenous and lineage-based cultures. In the Americas, We'wha (Zuni), was a lhamana (male individuals who, at least some of the time, dress and live in the roles usually filled by women in that culture); a respected artist, We'wha served as an emissary of the Zuni to Washington, where he met President Grover Cleveland. We'wha had at least one husband who was generally recognized as such.

While it is a relatively new practice to grant same-sex couples the same form of legal marital recognition as commonly granted to mixed-sex couples, there is some history of recorded same-sex unions around the world. Ancient Greek same-sex relationships were like modern companionate marriages, unlike their different-sex marriages in which the spouses had few emotional ties, and the husband had freedom to engage in outside sexual liaisons. The Codex Theodosianus (C. Th. 9.7.3) issued in 438 CE imposed severe penalties or death on same-sex relationships, but the exact intent of the law and its relation to social practice is unclear, as only a few examples of same-sex relationships in that culture exist. Same-sex unions were celebrated in some regions of China, such as Fujian. Possibly the earliest documented same-sex wedding in Latin Christendom occurred in Rome, Italy, at the San Giovanni a Porta Latina basilica in 1581.

=== Temporary marriages ===
Examples of temporary marriage include the practices of "walking marriage" among the matrilineal Mosuo people of China, of handfasting among some Germanic peoples during the Middle Ages, and fixed-term marriages in the Muslim world.

Historically, pre-Islamic Arab societies practiced a form of temporary marriage that carries on today in the practice of nikāh mutʿah ("temporary gratification" or "temporary gift"), a fixed-term marriage contract of varying duration (otherwise known as sigheh in Iran and mutʿah in Iraq). The Islamic prophet Muḥammad explicitly sanctioned his followers from engaging in the practice of temporary marriages, which he considered to be a form of zināʾ ("adultery" and/or "fornication"), an umbrella term which specifically refers to unlawful sexual intercourse in the Qurʾān and Islamic law. The practice of zināʾ, which covers any form of illicit sexual relations in the Qurʾān and Islamic jurisprudence, and can provide a legitimizing cover for non-marital sex, prostitution, pimping, and sex workers, is commonly conflated with prostitution under the legal statutes of Muslim-majority countries and is officially prohibited as illegal in all of them, with the only exception of Turkey where prostitution is legalized.

The same forms of temporary marriage have been used in Egypt, Lebanon, and Iran to make the donation of a human ova legal for in vitro fertilisation; a woman cannot, however, use this kind of marriage to obtain a sperm donation. In recent times, societal controversies related to the practice of nikāh mutʿah in Sunnī-majority Muslim countries have resulted in the practice being confined mostly to Shīʿa Muslim communities.

=== Cohabitation ===
In some jurisdictions cohabitation, in certain circumstances, may constitute a common-law marriage, an unregistered partnership, or otherwise provide the unmarried partners with various rights and responsibilities; and in some countries, the laws recognize cohabitation in lieu of institutional marriage for taxation and social security benefits. This is the case, for example, in Australia. Cohabitation may be an option pursued as a form of resistance to traditional institutionalized marriage. However, in this context, some nations reserve the right to define the relationship as marital, or otherwise to regulate the relation, even if the relation has not been registered with the state or a religious institution.

Conversely, institutionalized marriages may not involve cohabitation. In some cases, couples living together do not wish to be recognized as married. This may occur because pension or alimony rights are adversely affected; because of taxation considerations; because of immigration issues, or for other reasons. Such marriages have also been increasingly common in Beijing. Guo Jianmei, director of the center for women's studies at Beijing University, told a Newsday correspondent, "Walking marriages reflect sweeping changes in Chinese society." A "walking marriage" refers to a type of temporary marriage formed by the Mosuo of China, in which male partners live elsewhere and make nightly visits. A similar arrangement in Saudi Arabia, called misyar marriage, also involves the husband and wife living separately but meeting regularly.

== Partner selection ==
Age at marriage women

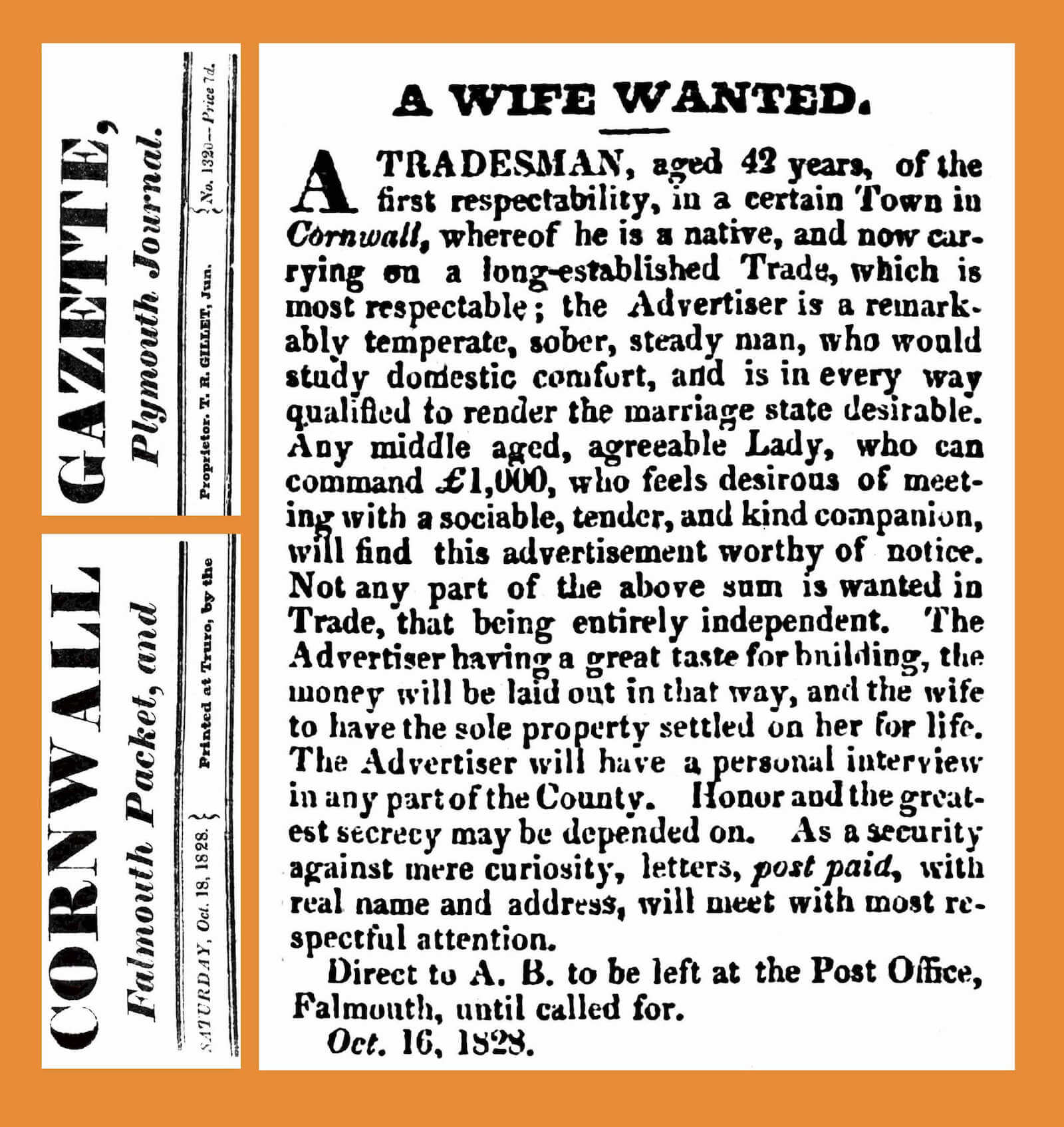
In an 1828 "Wife Wanted" advertisement, an Englishman claiming a "great taste for building" pledges to apply a prospective wife's dowry-like £1000+ to build property that will be "settled on her for life".

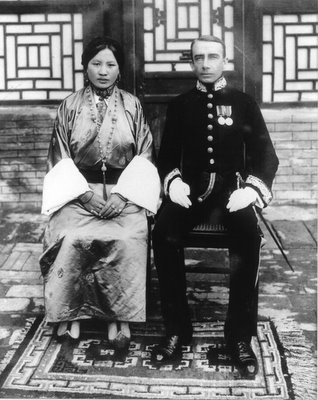
The wedding of Rinchen Lhamo, a Tibetan woman, and Louis King, an Englishman

There is wide cross-cultural variation in the social rules governing the selection of a partner for marriage. There is variation in the degree to which partner selection is an individual decision by the partners or a collective decision by the partners' kin groups, and there is variation in the rules regulating which partners are valid choices.

The United Nations World Fertility Report of 2003 reports that 89% of all people get married before age forty-nine. The percent of women and men who marry before age forty-nine drops to nearly 50% in some nations and reaches near 100% in other nations.

In other cultures with less strict rules governing the groups from which a partner can be chosen the selection of a marriage partner may involve either the couple going through a selection process of courtship or the marriage may be arranged by the couple's parents or an outside party, a matchmaker. The period between a marriage proposal and marriage is also called engagement.

=== Age difference ===
Since the 1950s, the median age at first marriage in the US has increased by over eight years for each gender, while the age disparity has remained relatively stable.

Some people want to marry a person that is older or younger than they. This may impact marital stability and partners with more than a 10-year age gap tend to experience social disapproval. In addition, older women (older than 35) have increased health risks when getting pregnant.

=== Social status and wealth ===
Some people want to marry a person with higher or lower status than them. Others want to marry people who have similar status. In many societies, women marry men who are of higher social status. There are marriages where each party has sought a partner of similar status.

Some persons also wish to engage in transactional relationship for money (thus a type of marriage of convenience). Such people are sometimes referred to as gold diggers. Separate property systems can however be used to prevent property of being passed on to partners after divorce or death.

Higher income men are more likely to marry and less likely to divorce. High income women are more likely to divorce.

=== Incest taboo, exogamy, and endogamy ===
Societies have often placed restrictions on marriage to relatives, though the degree of prohibited relationship varies widely. Marriages between parents and children, or between full siblings, with few exceptions, have been considered incest and forbidden. However, marriages between more distant relatives have been much more common, with one estimate being that 80% of all marriages in history have been between second cousins or closer. This proportion has fallen dramatically, but still, more than 10% of all marriages are believed to be between people who are second cousins or more closely related. In the United States, such marriages are now highly stigmatized, and laws ban most or all first-cousin marriage in 30 states. In South Korea, historically it was illegal to marry someone with the same last name and same ancestral line.

An Avunculate marriage is a marriage that occurs between an uncle and his niece or between an aunt and her nephew. Such marriages are illegal in most countries due to incest restrictions. However, a small number of countries have legalized it, including Argentina, Australia, Austria, Malaysia, and Russia.

Family chart showing relatives who, in Islamic Sharia law, would be considered mahrim (or maharem): unmarriageable kin with whom sexual intercourse would be considered incestuous

In various societies, the choice of partner is often limited to suitable persons from specific social groups. In some societies the rule is that a partner is selected from an individual's own social group – endogamy, this is often the case in class- and caste-based societies. But in other societies a partner must be chosen from a different group than one's own – exogamy, this may be the case in societies practicing totemic religion where society is divided into several exogamous totemic clans, such as most Aboriginal Australian societies. In other societies a person is expected to marry their cross-cousin, a woman must marry her father's sister's son and a man must marry his mother's brother's daughter – this is often the case if either a society has a rule of tracing kinship exclusively through patrilineal or matrilineal descent groups as among the Akan people of West Africa. Another kind of marriage selection is the levirate marriage in which widows are obligated to marry their husband's brother, mostly found in societies where kinship is based on endogamous clan groups.

Religion has commonly weighed in on the matter of which relatives, if any, are allowed to marry. Relations may be by consanguinity or affinity, meaning by blood or by marriage. On the marriage of cousins, Catholic policy has evolved from initial acceptance, through a long period of general prohibition, to the contemporary requirement for a dispensation. Islam has always allowed it, while Hindu texts vary widely.

=== Prescriptive marriage ===
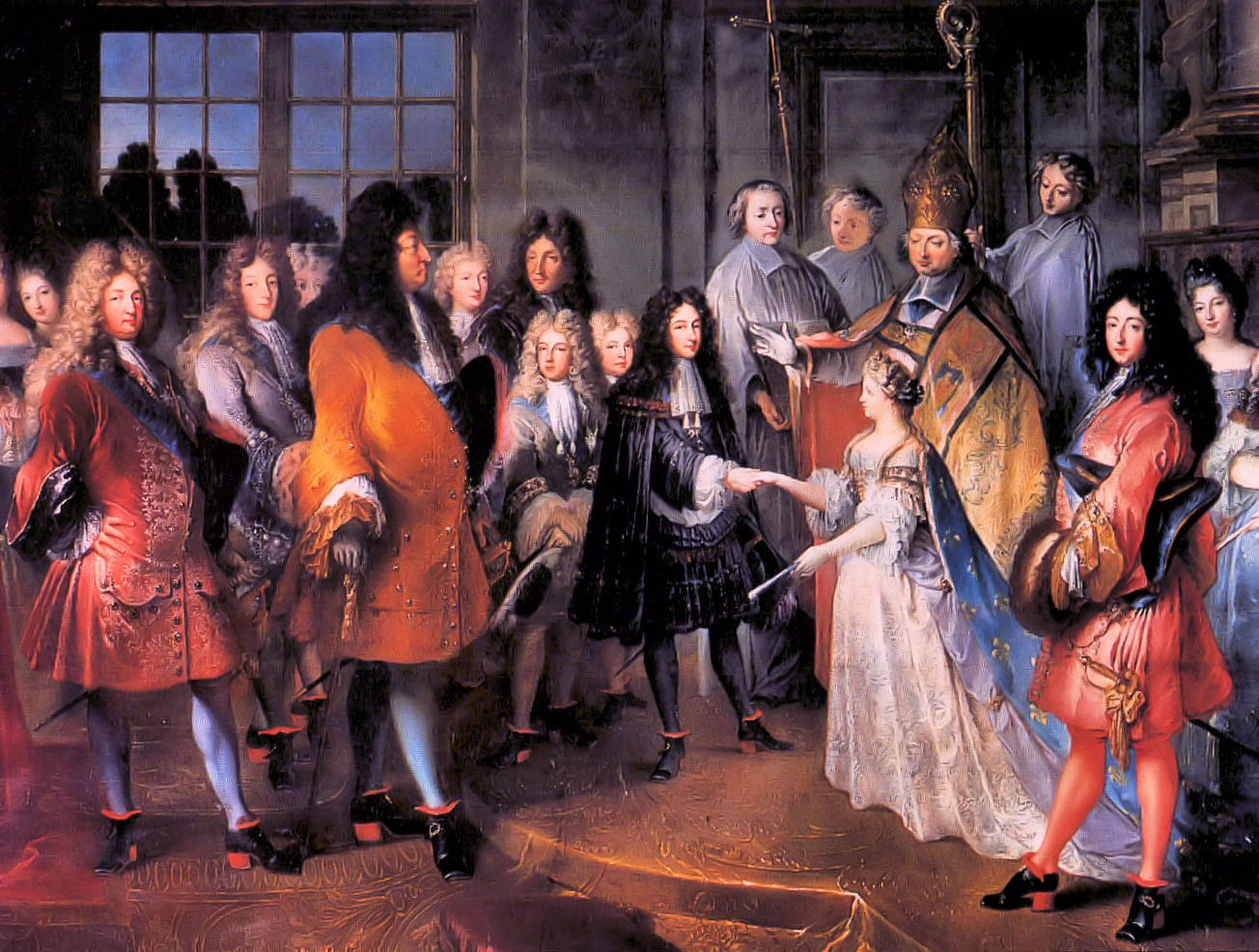
An arranged marriage between Louis XIV of France and Maria Theresa of Spain

In a wide array of lineage-based societies with a classificatory kinship system, potential spouses are sought from a specific class of relative as determined by a prescriptive marriage rule. This rule may be expressed by anthropologists using a "descriptive" kinship term, such as a "man's mother's brother's daughter" (also known as a "cross-cousin"). Such descriptive rules mask the participant's perspective: a man should marry a woman from his mother's lineage. Within the society's kinship terminology, such relatives are usually indicated by a specific term which sets them apart as potentially marriageable. Pierre Bourdieu notes, however, that very few marriages ever follow the rule, and that when they do so, it is for "practical kinship" reasons such as the preservation of family property, rather than the "official kinship" ideology.

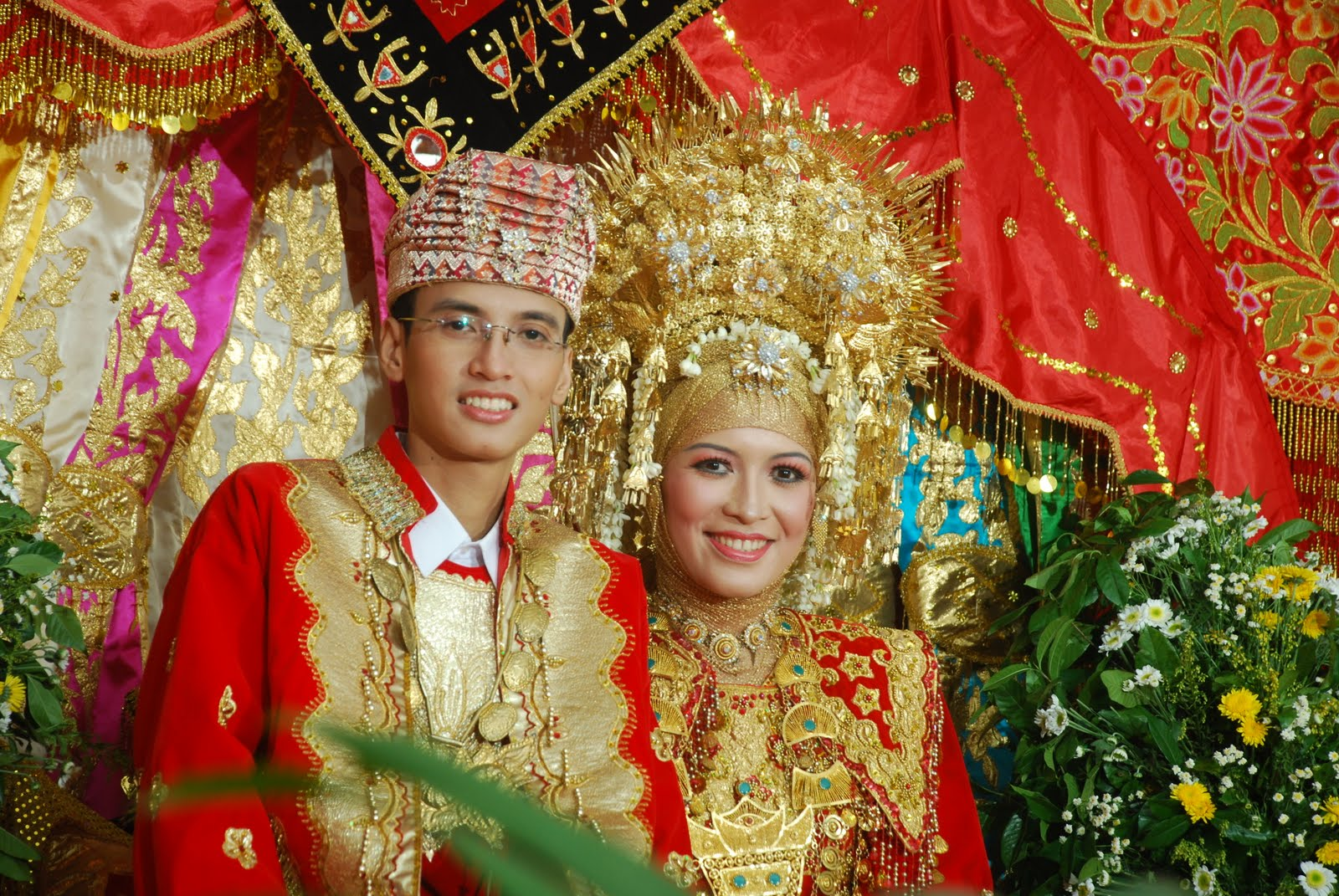
Indonesian wedding

Insofar as regular marriages following prescriptive rules occur, lineages are linked together in fixed relationships; these ties between lineages may form political alliances in kinship dominated societies. French structural anthropologist Claude Lévi-Strauss developed alliance theory to account for the "elementary" kinship structures created by the limited number of prescriptive marriage rules possible.

A pragmatic (or 'arranged') marriage is made easier by formal procedures of family or group politics. A responsible authority sets up or encourages the marriage; they may, indeed, engage a professional matchmaker to find a suitable spouse for an unmarried person. The authority figure could be parents, family, a religious official, or a group consensus.

=== Forced marriage ===
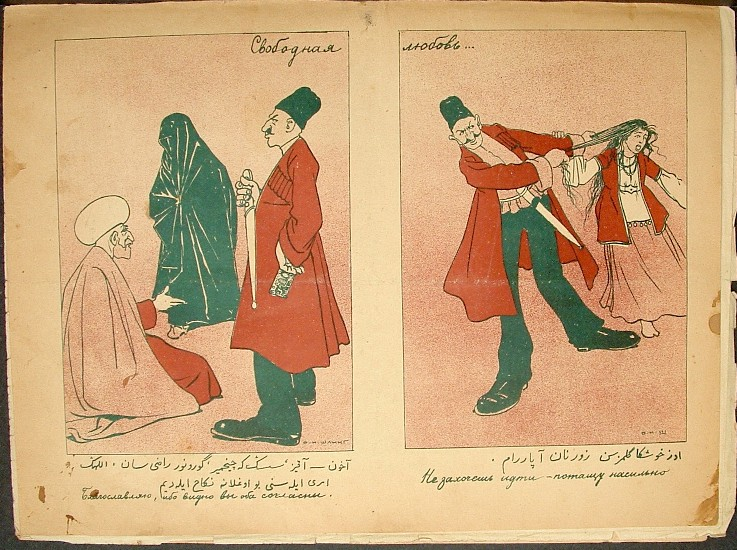
Criticism about the Azeri society tradition from domestic violence to the social and political participation of women in the community

A forced marriage is a marriage in which one or both of the parties is married against their will. Forced marriages continue to be practiced in parts of the world, especially in South Asia and Africa. The line between forced marriage and consensual marriage may become blurred, because the social norms of these cultures dictate that one should never oppose the desire of one's parents/relatives in regard to the choice of a spouse; in such cultures, it is not necessary for violence, threats, intimidation etc. to occur, the person simply "consents" to the marriage even if they do not want it, out of the implied social pressure and duty. The customs of bride price and dowry, that exist in parts of the world, can lead to bride buying and selling people into marriage.

In some societies, ranging from Central Asia to the Caucasus to Africa, the custom of bride kidnapping still exists, in which a woman is captured by a man and his friends. Sometimes this covers an elopement, but sometimes it depends on sexual violence. In previous times, raptio was a larger-scale version of this, with groups of women captured by groups of men, sometimes in war; the most famous example is The Rape of the Sabine Women, which provided the first citizens of Rome with their wives.

Other marriage partners are more or less imposed on an individual. For example, widow inheritance provides a widow with another man from her late husband's brothers.

In rural areas of India, child marriage is practiced, with parents often arranging the wedding, sometimes even before the child is born. This practice was made illegal under the Child Marriage Restraint Act of 1929.

== Economic considerations ==
The financial aspects of marriage vary between cultures and have changed over time.

In some cultures, dowries and bride wealth continue to be required today. In both cases, the financial arrangements are usually made between the groom (or his family) and the bride's family; with the bride often not being involved in the negotiations, and often not having a choice in whether to participate in the marriage.

In early modern Britain, the social status of the couple was supposed to be equal. After the marriage, all the property (called "fortune") and expected inheritances of the wife belonged to the husband.

=== Dowry ===
A dowry is

a process whereby parental property is distributed to a daughter at her marriage (i.e. inter vivos) rather than at the holder's death (mortis causa)… A dowry establishes some variety of conjugal fund, the nature of which may vary widely. This fund ensures her support (or endowment) in widowhood and eventually goes to provide for her sons and daughters.

In some cultures, especially in countries such as Turkey, India, Bangladesh, Pakistan, Sri Lanka, Morocco, and Nepal, dowries continue to be expected. In India, thousands of dowry-related deaths have taken place on yearly basis, to counter this problem, several jurisdictions have enacted laws restricting or banning dowry (see Dowry law in India). In Nepal, dowry was made illegal in 2009. Some authors believe that the giving and receiving of dowry reflects the status and even the effort to climb high in social hierarchy.

=== Dower ===
Direct Dowry contrasts with bride wealth, which is paid by the groom or his family to the bride's parents, and with indirect dowry (or dower), which is property given to the bride herself by the groom at the time of marriage and which remains under her ownership and control.

In the Jewish tradition, the rabbis in ancient times insisted on the marriage couple entering into a prenuptial agreement, called a ketubah. Besides other things, the ketubah provided for an amount to be paid by the husband in the event of a divorce or his estate in the event of his death. This amount was a replacement of the biblical dower or bride price, which was payable at the time of the marriage by the groom to the father of the bride, because many young prospective husbands could not raise the bride price at the time when they would normally be expected to marry. It is the predecessor to the wife's present-day entitlement to maintenance in the event of the breakup of marriage, and family maintenance in the event of the husband not providing adequately for the wife in his will. Another function performed by the ketubah amount was to provide a disincentive for the husband contemplating divorcing his wife.

Morning gifts, which might also be arranged by the bride's father rather than the bride, are given to the bride herself; the name derives from the Germanic tribal custom of giving them the morning after the wedding night. She might have control of this morning gift during the lifetime of her husband, but is entitled to it when widowed. If the amount of her inheritance is settled by law rather than agreement, it may be called dower. Depending on legal systems and the exact arrangement, she may not be entitled to dispose of it after her death, and may lose the property if she remarries. Morning gifts were preserved for centuries in morganatic marriage, a union where the wife's inferior social status was held to prohibit her children from inheriting a noble's titles or estates. In this case, the morning gift would support the wife and children. Another legal provision for widowhood was jointure, in which property, often land, would be held in joint tenancy, so that it would automatically go to the widow on her husband's death.

Islamic tradition has similar practices. A 'mahr', either immediate or deferred, is the woman's portion of the groom's wealth (divorce) or estate (death). These amounts are usually set on the basis of the groom's own and family wealth and incomes, but in some parts these are set very high so as to provide a disincentive for the groom exercising the divorce, or the husband's family 'inheriting' a large portion of the estate, especially if there are no male offspring from the marriage. In some countries, including Iran, the mahr or alimony can amount to more than a man can ever hope to earn, sometimes up to US$1,000,000 (4000 official Iranian gold coins). If the husband cannot pay the mahr, either in case of a divorce or on demand, according to the current laws in Iran, he will have to pay it by installments. Failure to pay the mahr might even lead to imprisonment.

=== Bridewealth ===
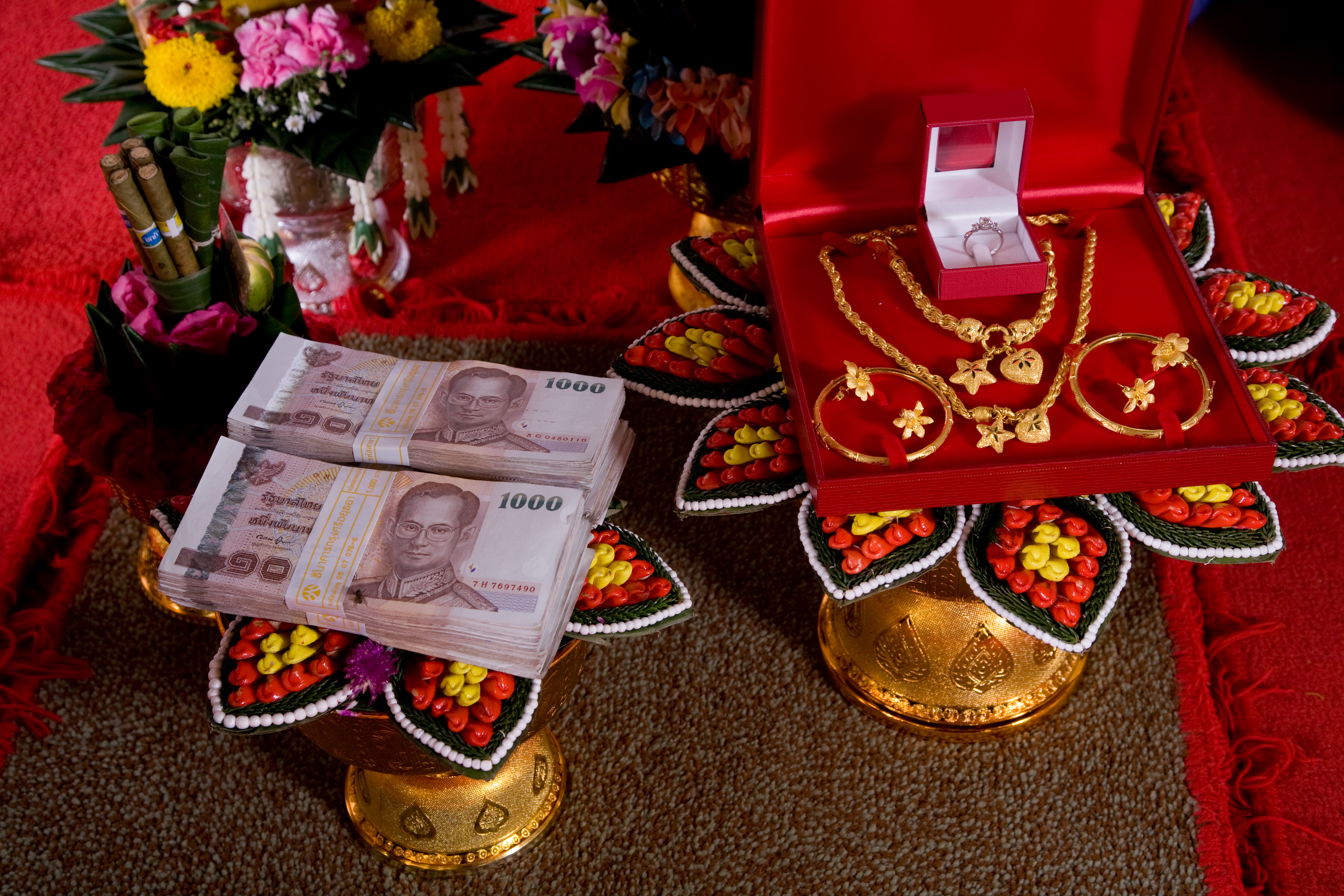
Traditional, formal presentation of the bridewealth (also known as "sin sot") at an engagement ceremony in Thailand

Bridewealth is a common practice in parts of Southeast Asia (Thailand, Cambodia), parts of Central Asia, and in much of sub-Saharan Africa. It is also known as brideprice although this has fallen in disfavor as it implies the purchase of the bride. Bridewealth is the amount of money or property or wealth paid by the groom or his family to the parents of a woman upon the marriage of their daughter to the groom. In anthropological literature, bride price has often been explained as payment made to compensate the bride's family for the loss of her labor and fertility. In some cases, bridewealth is a means by which the groom's family's ties to the children of the union are recognized.

=== Taxation ===
In some countries a married person or couple benefits from various taxation advantages not available to a single person. For example, spouses may be allowed to average their combined incomes. This is advantageous to a married couple with disparate incomes. To compensate for this, countries may provide a higher tax bracket for the averaged income of a married couple. While income averaging might still benefit a married couple with a stay-at-home spouse, such averaging would cause a married couple with roughly equal personal incomes to pay more total tax than they would as two single persons. In the United States, this is called the marriage penalty.

When the rates applied by the tax code are not based income averaging, but rather on the sum of individuals' incomes, higher rates will usually apply to each individual in a two-earner households in a progressive tax systems. This is most often the case with high-income taxpayers and is another situation called a marriage penalty.

Conversely, when progressive tax is levied on the individual with no consideration for the partnership, dual-income couples fare much better than single-income couples with similar household incomes. The effect can be increased when the welfare system treats the same income as a shared income thereby denying welfare access to the non-earning spouse. Such systems apply in Australia and Canada, for example.

== Post-marital residence ==
In many Western cultures, marriage usually leads to the formation of a new household comprising the married couple, with the married couple living together in the same home, often sharing the same bed, but in some other cultures this is not the tradition. Among the Minangkabau of West Sumatra, residency after marriage is matrilocal, with the husband moving into the household of his wife's mother. Residency after marriage can also be patrilocal or avunculocal. In these cases, married couples may not form an independent household, but remain part of an extended family household.

Early theories explaining the determinants of postmarital residence connected it with the sexual division of labor. However, to date, cross-cultural tests of this hypothesis using worldwide samples have failed to find any significant relationship between these two variables. However, Korotayev's tests show that the female contribution to subsistence does correlate significantly with matrilocal residence in general. However, this correlation is masked by a general polygyny factor.

Although, in different-sex marriages, an increase in the female contribution to subsistence tends to lead to matrilocal residence, it also tends simultaneously to lead to general non-sororal polygyny which effectively destroys matrilocality. If this polygyny factor is controlled (e.g., through a multiple regression model), division of labor turns out to be a significant predictor of postmarital residence. Thus, Murdock's hypotheses regarding the relationships between the sexual division of labor and postmarital residence were basically correct, though the actual relationships between those two groups of variables are more complicated than he expected.

There has been a trend toward the neolocal residence in western societies.

== Law ==
Marriage laws refer to the legal requirements which determine the validity of a marriage, which vary considerably between countries. Article 16 of the Universal Declaration of Human Rights declares that:

1. Men and women of full age, without any limitation due to race, nationality or religion, have the right to marry and to found a family. They are entitled to equal rights as to marriage, during marriage and at its dissolution.

2. Marriage shall be entered into only with the free and full consent of the intending spouses.

3. The family is the natural and fundamental group unit of society and is entitled to protection by society and the State.

— Universal Declaration of Human Rights, Article 16

=== Rights and obligations ===
A marriage bestows rights and obligations on the married parties, and sometimes on relatives as well, being the sole mechanism for the creation of affinal ties (in-laws). These may include, depending on jurisdiction:

- Giving one spouse or his/her family control over the other spouse's sexual services, labor, and property.
- Giving one spouse responsibility for the other's debts.
- Giving one spouse visitation rights when the other is incarcerated or hospitalized.
- Giving one spouse control over the other's affairs when the other is incapacitated.
- Establishing the second legal guardian of a parent's child.
- Establishing a joint fund of property for the benefit of children.
- Establishing a relationship between the families of the spouses.

These rights and obligations vary considerably between societies, and between groups within society. These might include arranged marriages, family obligations, the legal establishment of a nuclear family unit, the legal protection of children and public declaration of commitment.

=== Property regime ===
In many countries today, each marriage partner has the choice of keeping his or her property separate or combining properties. In the latter case, called community property, when the marriage ends by divorce each owns half. In lieu of a will or trust, property owned by the deceased generally is inherited by the surviving spouse.

In some legal systems, the partners in a marriage are "jointly liable" for the debts of the marriage. This has a basis in a traditional legal notion called the "Doctrine of Necessities" whereby, in a heterosexual marriage, a husband was responsible to provide necessary things for his wife. Where this is the case, one partner may be sued to collect a debt for which they did not expressly contract. Critics of this practice note that debt collection agencies can abuse this by claiming an unreasonably wide range of debts to be expenses of the marriage. The cost of defense and the burden of proof is then placed on the non-contracting party to prove that the expense is not a debt of the family. The respective maintenance obligations, both during and eventually after a marriage, are regulated in most jurisdictions; alimony is one such method.

=== Restrictions ===
Marriage is an institution that is historically filled with restrictions. From age, to race, to social status, to consanguinity, to gender, restrictions are placed on marriage by society for reasons of benefiting the children, passing on healthy genes, maintaining cultural values, or because of prejudice and fear. Almost all cultures that recognize marriage also recognize adultery as a violation of the terms of marriage.

==== Age ====
Most jurisdictions set a minimum age for marriage; that is, a person must attain a certain age to be legally allowed to marry. This age may depend on circumstances, for instance exceptions from the general rule may be permitted if the parents of a young person express their consent and/or if a court decides that said marriage is in the best interest of the young person (often this applies in cases where a girl is pregnant). Although most age restrictions are in place in order to prevent children from being forced into marriages, especially to much older partners – marriages which can have negative education and health related consequences, and lead to child sexual abuse and other forms of violence – such child marriages remain common in parts of the world. According to the UN, child marriages are most common in rural sub-Saharan Africa and South Asia. The ten countries with the highest rates of child marriage are: Niger (75%), Chad, Central African Republic, Bangladesh, Guinea, Mozambique, Mali, Burkina Faso, South Sudan, and Malawi.

==== Kinship ====
To prohibit incest and eugenic reasons, marriage laws have set restrictions for relatives to marry. Direct blood relatives are usually prohibited to marry, while for branch line relatives, laws are wary.

Kinship relations through marriage is also called "affinity", relationships that arise in one's group of origin, can also be called one's descent group. Some cultures in kinship relationships may be considered to extend out to those who they have economic or political relationships with; or other forms of social connections. Within some cultures they may lead you back to gods or animal ancestors (totems). This can be conceived of on a more or less literal basis.

==== Race ====
U.S. states, by the date of repeal of anti-miscegenation laws: No laws passed Repealed before 1887 Repealed between 1948 and 1967 Overturned on 12 June 1967

Laws banning "race-mixing" were enforced in certain North American jurisdictions from 1691 until 1967, in Nazi Germany (the Nuremberg Laws) from 1935 until 1945, and in South Africa during most part of the apartheid era (1949–1985). All these laws primarily banned marriage between persons of different racially or ethnically defined groups, which was termed "amalgamation" or "miscegenation" in the U.S. The laws in Nazi Germany and many of the U.S. states, as well as South Africa, also banned sexual relations between such individuals.

In the United States, laws in some but not all of the states prohibited the marriage of whites and blacks, and in many states also the intermarriage of whites with Native Americans or Asians. In the U.S., such laws were known as anti-miscegenation laws. From 1913 until 1948, 30 out of the then 48 states enforced such laws. Although an "Anti-Miscegenation Amendment" to the United States Constitution was proposed in 1871, in 1912–1913, and in 1928, no nationwide law against racially mixed marriages was ever enacted. In 1967, the Supreme Court of the United States unanimously ruled in Loving v. Virginia that anti-miscegenation laws are unconstitutional. With this ruling, these laws were no longer in effect in the remaining 16 states that still had them.

The Nazi ban on interracial marriage and interracial sex was enacted in September 1935 as part of the Nuremberg Laws, the Gesetz zum Schutze des deutschen Blutes und der deutschen Ehre (The Law for the Protection of German Blood and German Honour). The Nuremberg Laws classified Jews as a race and forbade marriage and extramarital sexual relations at first with people of Jewish descent, but was later ended to the "Gypsies, Negroes or their bastard offspring" and people of "German or related blood". Such relations were marked as Rassenschande (lit. 'race-disgrace') and could be punished by imprisonment (usually followed by deportation to a concentration camp) and even by death.

In South Africa, the Prohibition of Mixed Marriages Act, 1949 prohibited marriage between persons of different races, and the Immorality Act of 1950 made sexual relations with a person of a different race a crime.

==== Sex ====
Marriage open to same-sex couples (rings: individual cases) Legislation or binding domestic court ruling establishing same-sex marriage, but marriage is not yet provided for Same-sex marriage recognized when performed in certain other jurisdictions, and accorded greater rights than local same-sex unions (if any) Civil unions or domestic partnerships Limited legal recognition (registered cohabitation) Local certification without legal force Limited recognition of marriage performed in certain other jurisdictions (residency rights for spouses) Country subject to an international court ruling to recognize same-sex marriage Same-sex unions not legally recognized

Same-sex marriage is legally performed and recognized in countries such as Andorra, Argentina, Australia, Austria, Belgium, Brazil, Canada, Chile, Colombia, Costa Rica, Cuba, Denmark, Ecuador, Estonia, Finland, France, Germany, Greece, Iceland, Ireland, Luxembourg, Malta, Mexico, the Netherlands, (Note: Same-sex marriage is performed and recognized by law in the Netherlands proper, including Bonaire, Sint Eustatius and Saba. Marriages entered into there have minimal recognition in Aruba, Curaçao and Sint Maarten.) New Zealand, (Note: Same-sex marriage is performed and recognized by law in New Zealand proper, but not in Tokelau, the Cook Islands or Niue, which together make up the Realm of New Zealand.) Norway, Portugal, Slovenia, South Africa, Spain, Sweden, Switzerland, Taiwan, the United Kingdom, (Note: Except the British Overseas Territories of Anguilla, the British Virgin Islands, the Cayman Islands, Montserrat and the Turks and Caicos Islands.) the United States, (Note: Same-sex marriage is performed and recognized by law in all fifty states and the District of Columbia, all territories except American Samoa, and in some tribal nations.) and Uruguay. Israel recognizes same-sex marriages entered into abroad as full marriages.

The introduction of same-sex marriage has varied by jurisdiction, being variously accomplished through legislative change to marriage law, a court ruling based on constitutional guarantees of equality, or by direct popular vote (via ballot initiative or referendum). The recognition of same-sex marriage is considered to be a human right and a civil right as well as a political, social, and religious issue. The most prominent supporters of same-sex marriage are human rights and civil rights organizations as well as the medical and scientific communities, while the most prominent opponents are religious groups. Various faith communities around the world support same-sex marriage, while many religious groups oppose it. Polls consistently show continually rising support for the recognition of same-sex marriage in all developed democracies and in some developing democracies.

The establishment of recognition in law for the marriages of same-sex couples is one of the most prominent objectives of the LGBT rights movement.

==== Number of spouses ====
Polygamy is legal Polygamy is legal only for Muslims Polygamy is illegal, but practice is not criminalised Polygamy is illegal and practice criminalised Legal status unknown: In India, Malaysia, Philippines and Singapore polygamy is only legal for Muslims.; In Nigeria and South Africa, polygamous marriages under customary law and for Muslims are legally recognized.; In Mauritius, polygamous unions have no legal recognition. Muslim men may, however, "marry" up to four women, but they do not have the legal status of wives.

Polygyny is widely practiced in mostly Muslim and African countries. In the Middle Eastern region, Israel, Turkey and Tunisia are notable exceptions.

In most other jurisdictions, polygamy is illegal. For example, In the United States, polygamy is illegal in all 50 states.

In the late-19th century, citizens of the self-governing territory of what is present-day Utah were forced by the United States federal government to abandon the practice of polygamy through the vigorous enforcement of several Acts of Congress, and eventually complied. The Church of Jesus Christ of Latter-day Saints formally abolished the practice in 1890, in a document labeled 'The Manifesto' (see Latter Day Saint polygamy in the late-19th century). Among American Muslims, a small minority of around 50,000 to 100,000 people are estimated to live in families with a husband maintaining an illegal polygamous relationship.

Several countries such as India and Sri Lanka, permit only their Islamic citizens to practice polygamy. Some Indians have converted to Islam in order to bypass such legal restrictions. Predominantly Christian nations usually do not allow polygamous unions, with a handful of exceptions being the Republic of the Congo, Uganda, and Zambia.

=== State recognition ===
When a marriage is performed and carried out by a government institution in accordance with the marriage laws of the jurisdiction, without religious content, it is a civil marriage. Civil marriage recognizes and creates the rights and obligations intrinsic to matrimony in the eyes of the state. Some countries do not recognize locally performed religious marriage on its own, and require a separate civil marriage for official purposes. Conversely, civil marriage does not exist in some countries governed by a religious legal system, such as Saudi Arabia, where marriages contracted abroad might not be recognized if they were contracted contrary to Saudi interpretations of Islamic religious law. In countries governed by a mixed secular-religious legal system, such as Lebanon and Israel, locally performed civil marriage does not exist within the country, which prevents interfaith and various other marriages that contradict religious laws from being entered into in the country; however, civil marriages performed abroad may be recognized by the state even if they conflict with religious laws. For example, in the case of recognition of marriage in Israel, this includes recognition of not only interfaith civil marriages performed abroad, but also overseas same-sex civil marriages.

In various jurisdictions, a civil marriage may take place as part of the religious marriage ceremony, although they are theoretically distinct. Some jurisdictions allow civil marriages in circumstances which are notably not allowed by particular religions, such as same-sex marriages or civil unions. It is possible for two people to be recognized as married by a religious or other institution, but not by the state, and hence without the legal rights and obligations of marriage; or to have a civil marriage deemed invalid and sinful by a religion. Similarly, a couple may remain married in religious eyes after a civil divorce.

Most sovereign states and other jurisdictions limit legally recognized marriage to opposite-sex couples and a diminishing number of these permit polygyny marriage, polyandry marriage, group marriage, coverture marriage, arranged marriages, forced marriages, child marriages, cousin marriages, sibling marriages, teenage marriages, avunculate marriages, incestuous marriages, and bestiality marriages. In modern times, a growing number of countries, primarily developed democracies, have lifted bans on, and have established legal recognition for, equal rights for women and the marriages of interethnic, interracial, interfaith, interdenominational, interclass, intercommunity, transnational, and same-sex couples as well as immigrant couples, couples with an immigrant spouse, and other minority couples. In some areas, child marriages and polygamy may occur in spite of national laws against the practice.

==== Marriage license, civil ceremony, and registration ====
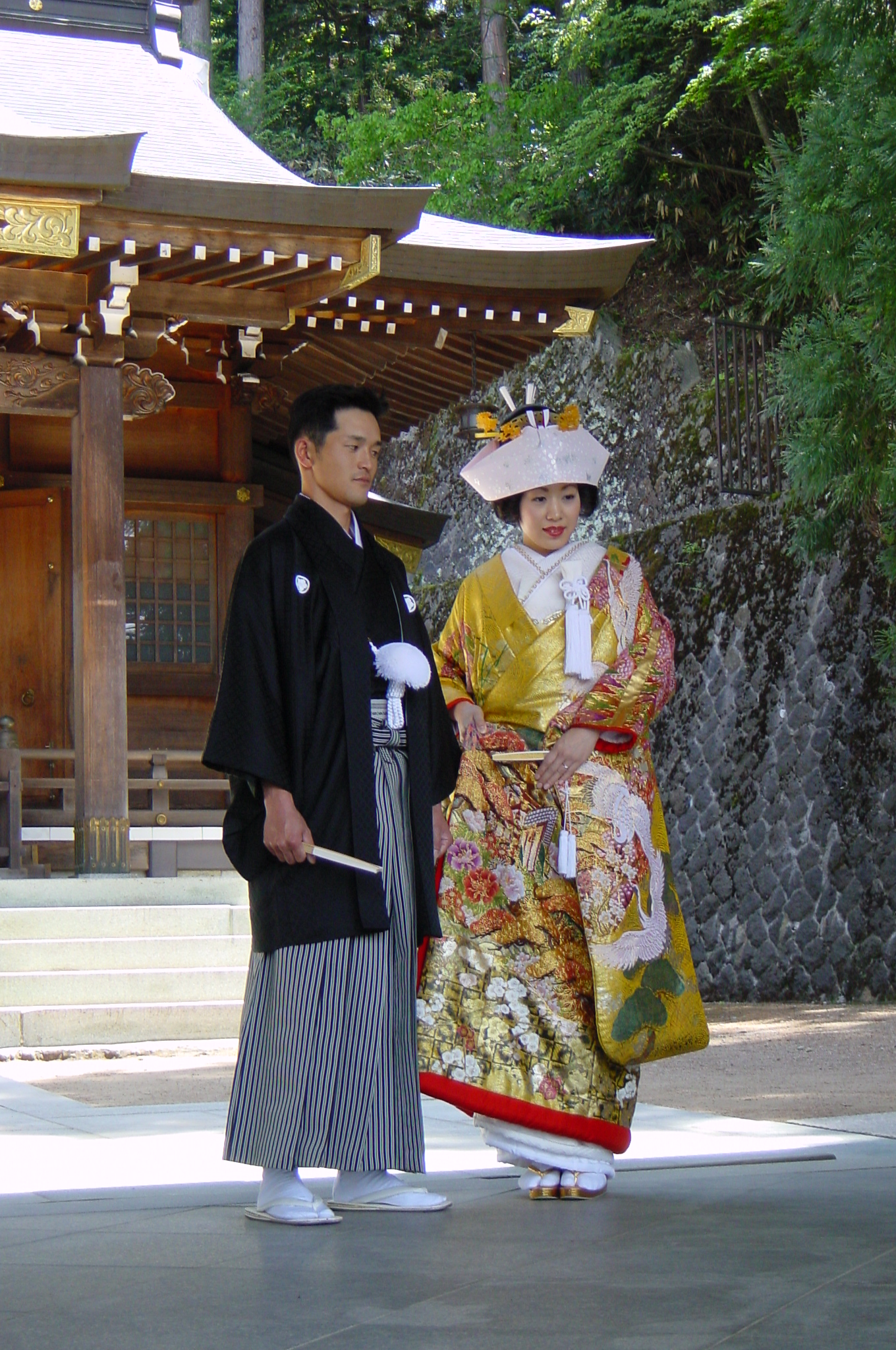
Couple married in a Shinto ceremony in Takayama, Gifu prefecture

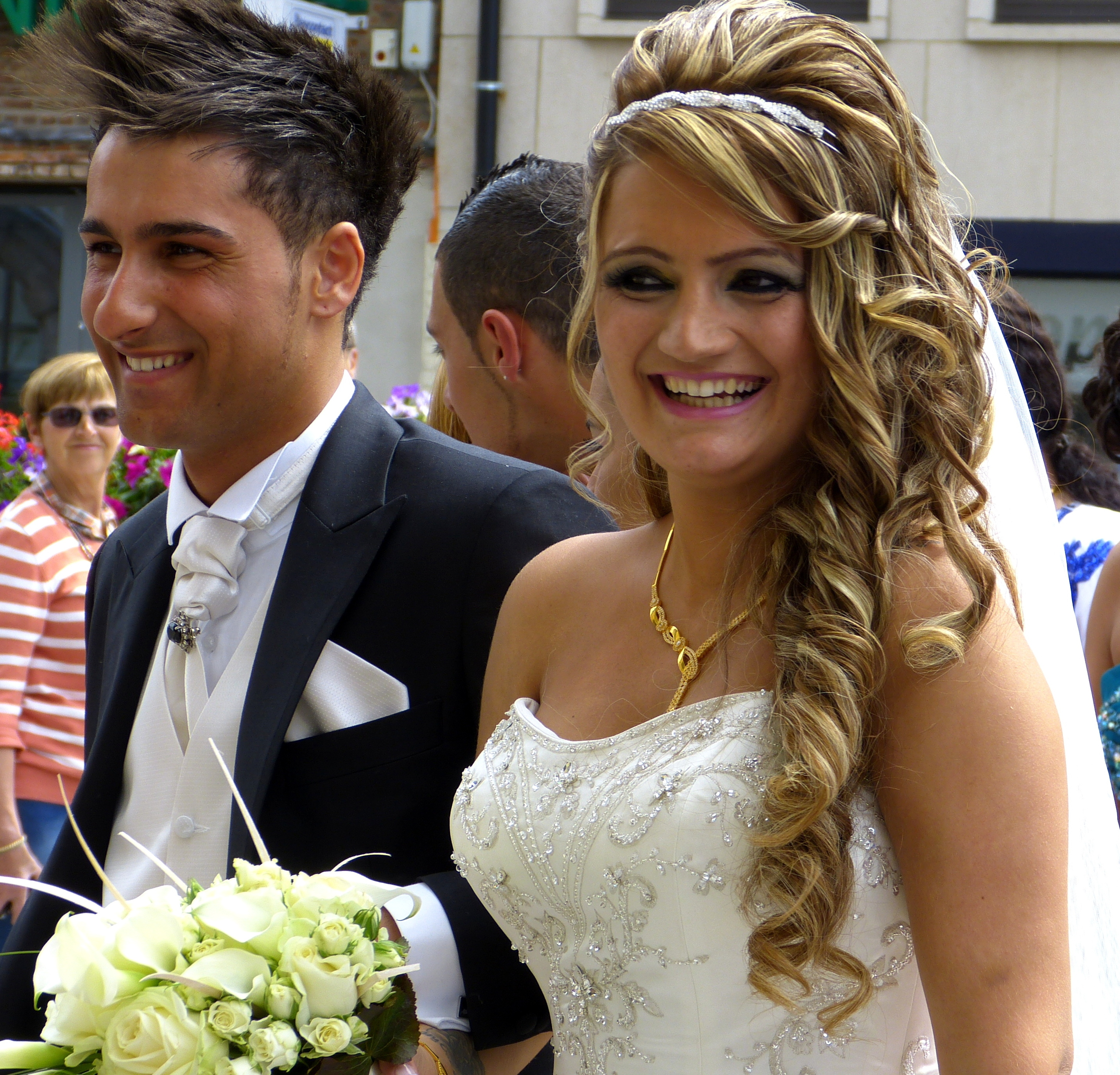
A newly married Assyrian couple

A marriage is usually formalized at a wedding or marriage ceremony. The ceremony may be officiated either by a religious official, by a government official or by a state approved celebrant. In various European and Latin American countries, any religious ceremony must be held separately from the required civil ceremony. Some countries – such as Belgium, Bulgaria, France, the Netherlands, Romania and Turkey – require that a civil ceremony take place before any religious one. In some countries – notably the United States, Canada, the United Kingdom, Ireland, Norway, and Spain – both ceremonies can be held together; the officiant at the religious and civil ceremony also serving as agent of the state to perform the civil ceremony. To avoid any implication that the state is "recognizing" a religious marriage (which is prohibited in some countries) – the "civil" ceremony is said to be taking place at the same time as the religious ceremony. Often this involves simply signing a register during the religious ceremony. If the civil element of the religious ceremony is omitted, the marriage ceremony is not recognized as a marriage by government under the law.

Some countries, such as Australia, permit marriages to be held in private and at any location; others, including England and Wales, require that the civil ceremony be conducted in a place open to the public and specially sanctioned by law for the purpose. In England, the place of marriage formerly had to be a church or register office, but this was extended to any public venue with the necessary licence. An exception can be made in the case of marriage by special emergency license (UK: licence), which is normally granted only when one of the parties is terminally ill. Rules about where and when persons can marry vary from place to place. Some regulations require one of the parties to reside within the jurisdiction of the register office (formerly parish).

Each religious authority has rules for the manner in which marriages are to be conducted by their officials and members. Where religious marriages are recognised by the state, the officiator must also conform with the law of the jurisdiction.

==== Common-law marriage ====
In a small number of jurisdictions marriage relationships may be created by the operation of the law alone. Unlike the typical ceremonial marriage with legal contract, wedding ceremony, and other details, a common-law marriage may be called "marriage by habit and repute (cohabitation)." A de facto common-law marriage without a license or ceremony is legally binding in some jurisdictions but has no legal consequence in others.

==== Civil unions ====
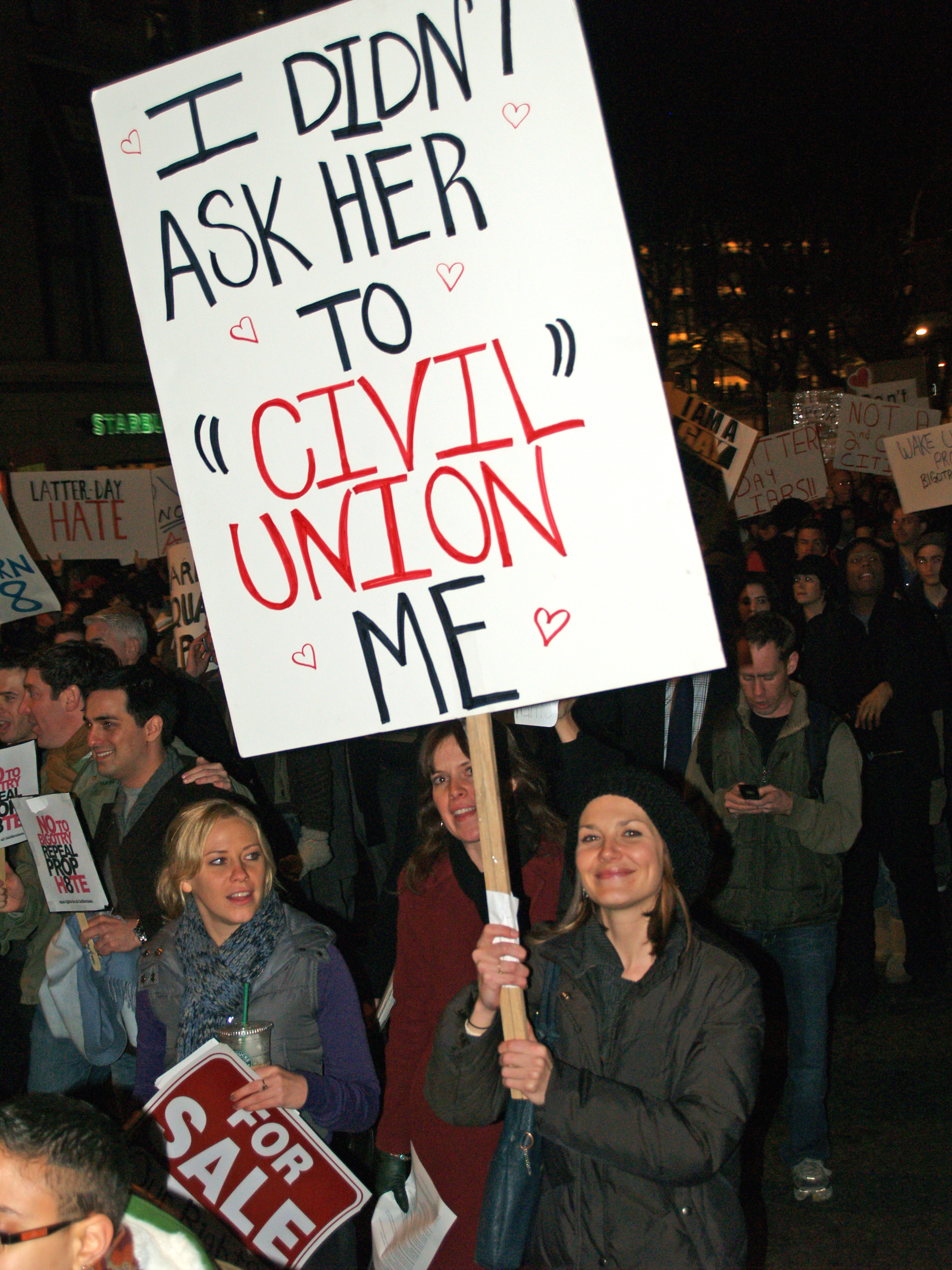
Various advocates of same-sex marriage, such as this protester at a demonstration in New York City against California Proposition 8, consider civil unions an inferior alternative to legal recognition of same-sex marriage.

A civil union, also referred to as a civil partnership, is a legally recognized form of partnership similar to marriage. Beginning with Denmark in 1989, civil unions under one name or another have been established by law in several countries in order to provide same-sex couples rights, benefits, and responsibilities similar (in some countries, identical) to opposite-sex civil marriage. In some jurisdictions, such as Brazil, New Zealand, Uruguay, Ecuador, France and the U.S. states of Hawaii and Illinois, civil unions are also open to opposite-sex couples.

== Religion ==
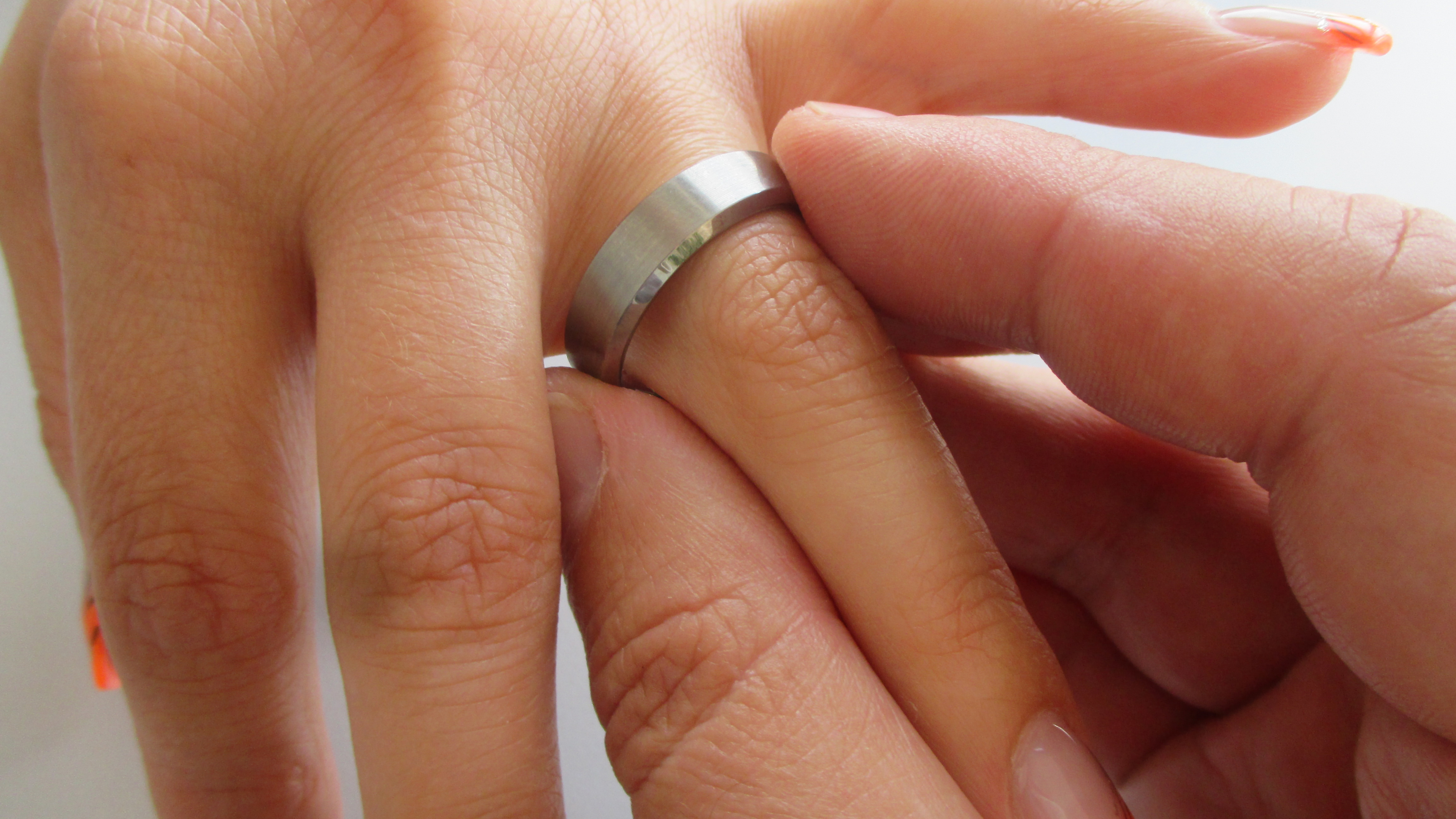
A man and woman exchange rings

Religions develop in specific geographic and social milieux, each with their own constraints as to what constitutes, and who can enter into, a valid religious marriage. Religious attitudes and practices relating to marriage vary, but have many similarities.

=== Abrahamic religions ===
==== Baháʼí Faith ====
The Baháʼí Faith encourages marriage and views it as a mutually strengthening bond. A Baháʼí marriage is contingent on the consent of all living parents.

Bahá’í scripture also states that marriage is conditioned on the consent of both parties and is not permissible before the age of maturity, which is fixed at 15.

==== Christianity ====
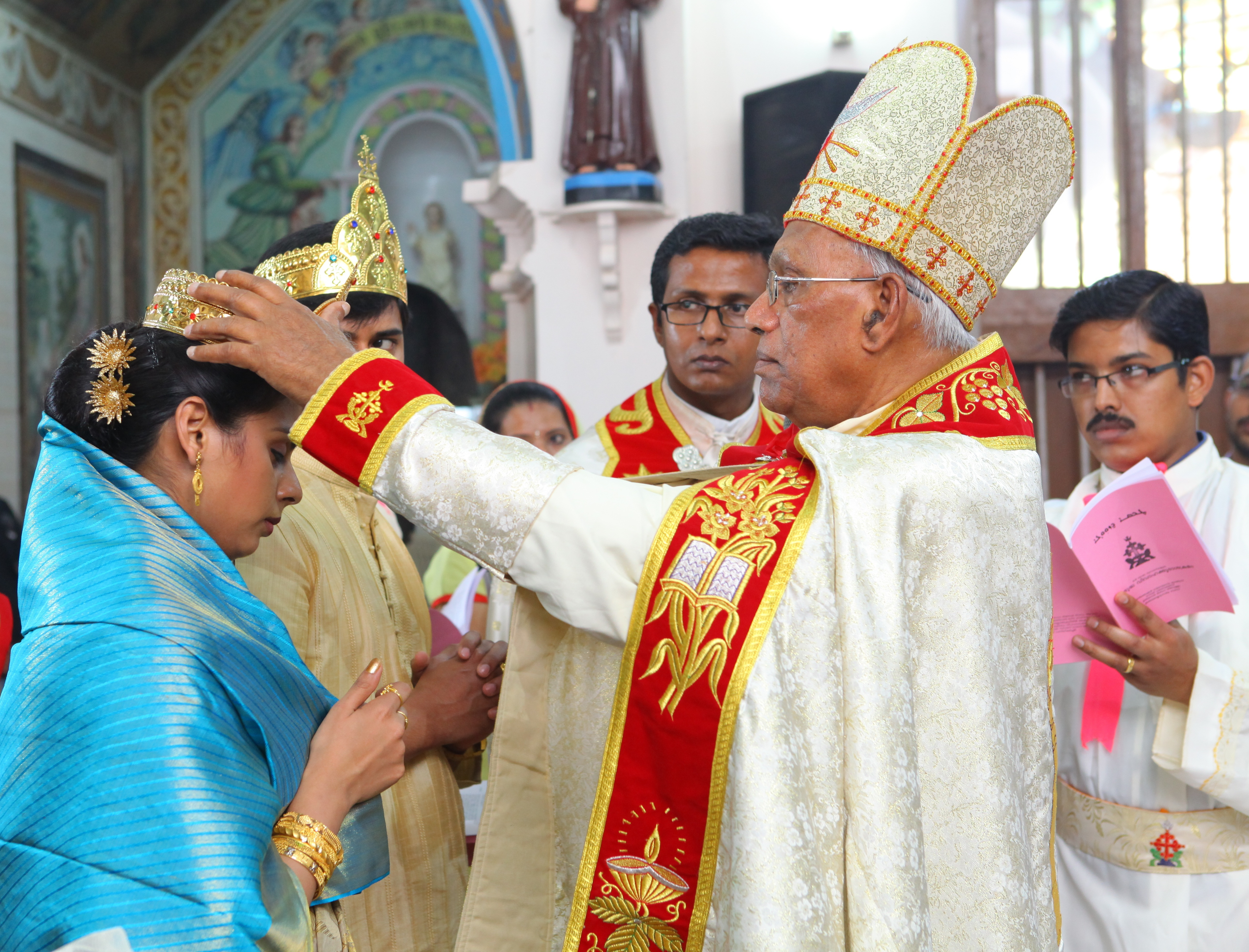
Crowning during Holy Matrimony in the Syro-Malabar Church, an Eastern Catholic Church and a part of the Saint Thomas Christian community in India

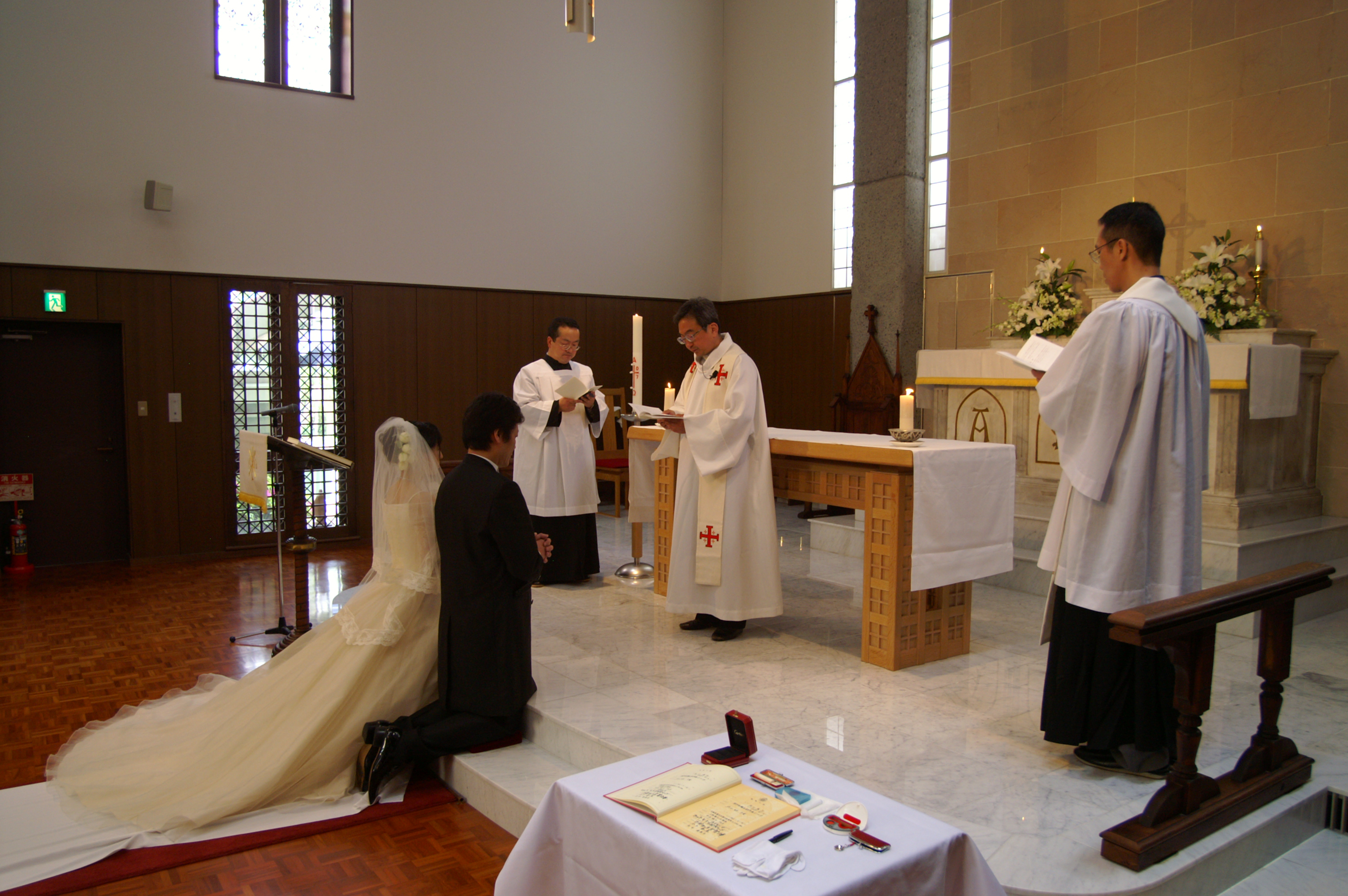
Christian wedding in Kyoto, Japan

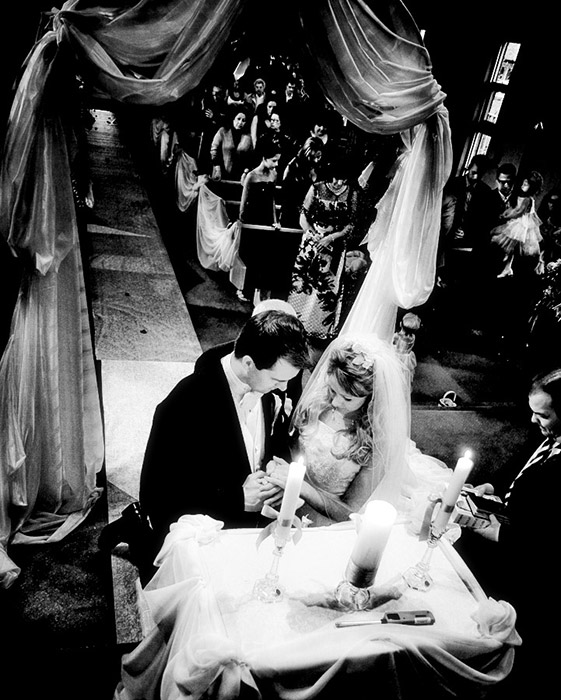
Russian Orthodox wedding ceremony

Christianity bases its views on marriage upon the teachings of Jesus and Paul the Apostle. Many Christian denominations regard marriage as a sacrament, sacred institution, or covenant. Since the 16th century, five competing models have shaped marriage in the Western tradition, as described by John Witte Jr.:

- Marriage as Sacrament in the Roman Catholic Tradition
- Marriage as Social Estate in the Lutheran Reformation
- Marriage as Covenant in the Reformed (and Methodist) Traditions
- Marriage as Commonwealth in the Anglican Tradition
- Marriage as Contract in the Enlightenment Tradition

The first known decrees on marriage were during the Catholic Council of Trent (1563), decrees that made the validity of marriage dependent on the wedding occurring in the presence of a priest and two witnesses. The absence of a requirement of parental consent ended a debate from the 12th century. In the case of a civil divorce, the innocent spouse has no right to marry again until the death of the other spouse terminates the still valid marriage, even if the other spouse was guilty of adultery.

The Christian Church performed marriages in the narthex of the church prior to the 16th century, when the emphasis was on the marital contract and betrothal. Subsequently, the ceremony moved inside the sacristy of the church.

Catholics, Eastern Orthodox, as well as many Anglicans and Methodists, consider marriage termed holy matrimony to be an expression of divine grace, termed a sacrament and mystery in the first two Christian traditions. In Western ritual, the ministers of the sacrament are the spouses themselves, with a bishop, priest, or deacon merely witnessing the union on behalf of the Church and blessing it. In Eastern ritual churches, the bishop or priest functions as the minister of the Sacred Mystery; Eastern Orthodox deacons may not perform marriages. Western Christians commonly refer to marriage as a vocation, while Eastern Christians consider it an ordination and a martyrdom. Marriage is commonly celebrated in the context of a Eucharistic service.

The Roman Catholic tradition of the 12th and 13th centuries defined marriage as a sacrament ordained by God, signifying the mystical marriage of Christ to his Church.

The matrimonial covenant, by which a man and a woman establish between themselves a partnership of the whole of life, is by its nature ordered toward the good of the spouses and the procreation and education of offspring; this covenant between baptized persons has been raised by Christ the Lord to the dignity of a sacrament.

For Catholic and Methodist Christians, the mutual love between husband and wife becomes an image of the eternal love with which God loves humankind. In the United Methodist Church, the celebration of Holy Matrimony ideally occurs in the context of a Service of Worship, which includes the celebration of the Eucharist. Likewise, the celebration of marriage between two Catholics normally takes place during celebration of the Holy Mass, because of its sacramental connection with the unity of the Paschal mystery of Christ (Communion). Sacramental marriage confers a perpetual and exclusive bond between spouses. By its nature, the institution of marriage and conjugal love is ordered to the procreation of offspring. Marriage creates rights and duties in the Church between the spouses and towards their children: "[e]ntering marriage with the intention of never having children is a grave wrong and more than likely grounds for an annulment". According to Roman Catholic legislation, progeny of annulled relationships are considered legitimate. Civilly remarried persons who civilly divorced a living and lawful spouse are not separated from the Church, but cannot receive Eucharistic Communion.

Divorce and remarriage, while generally not encouraged, are regarded differently by each denomination, with certain traditions, such as the Catholic Church, teaching the concept of an annulment. For example, the Reformed Church in America permits divorce and remarriage, while connexions such as the Evangelical Methodist Church Conference forbid divorce except in the case of fornication and do not allow for remarriage in any circumstance. The Eastern Orthodox Church allows divorce for a limited number of reasons, and in theory, but usually not in practice, requires that a marriage after divorce be celebrated with a penitential overtone. With respect to marriage between a Christian and a pagan, the early Church "sometimes took a more lenient view, invoking the so-called Pauline privilege of permissible separation (1 Cor. 7) as legitimate grounds for allowing a convert to divorce a pagan spouse and then marry a Christian."

The Catholic Church adheres to the proscription of Jesus that married spouses who have consummated their marriage "are no longer two, but one flesh. Therefore, what God has joined together, no human being must separate." Consequently, the Catholic Church understands that it is wholly without authority to terminate a sacramentally valid and consummated marriage, and its Codex Iuris Canonici (1983 Code of Canon Law) confirms this. Canon 1056 declares that "the essential properties of marriage are unity and indissolubility; in [C]hristian marriage they acquire a distinctive firmness by reason of the sacrament." Canon 1057, §2 declares that marriage is "an irrevocable covenant". Therefore, divorce of such a marriage is a metaphysical, moral, and legal impossibility. However, the Church has the authority to annul a presumed "marriage" by declaring it to have been invalid from the beginning, i.e., declaring it never to have been a marriage, in an annulment procedure, which is a fact-finding and fact-declaring effort.

For Protestant denominations, the purposes of marriage include intimate companionship, rearing children, and mutual support for spouses to fulfill their callings. Most Reformed Christians did not regard marriage to the status of a sacrament but considered it a covenant between spouses before God. Some Protestant denominations affirmed that Holy Matrimony is a "means of grace, thus, sacramental in character".

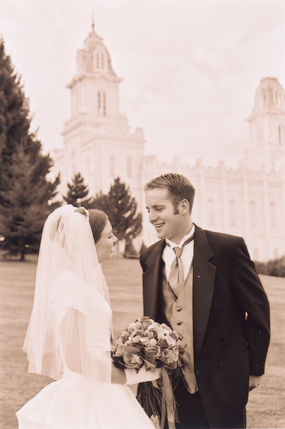
A couple following their marriage in the Manti Utah Temple

Members of the Church of Jesus Christ of Latter-day Saints (LDS Church) believe "marriage between a man and a woman is ordained of God and that the family is central to the Creator's plan for the eternal destiny of His children." Their view of marriage is that family relationships can endure beyond the grave. This is known as 'eternal marriage' which can be eternal only when authorized priesthood holders perform the sealing ordinance in sacred temples.

Historic Christian belief emphasizes that Christian weddings should occur in a church as Christian marriage should begin where one also starts their faith journey; Christians receive the sacrament of baptism in church in the presence of their congregation. Catholic Christian weddings must "take place in a church building" as holy matrimony is a sacrament; sacraments normatively occur in the presence of Christ in the house of God, and "members of the faith community [should be] present to witness the event and provide support and encouragement for those celebrating the sacrament." Bishops never grant permission "to those requesting to be married in a garden, on the beach, or some other place outside of the church" and a dispensation is only granted "in extraordinary circumstances (for example, if a bride or groom is ill or disabled and unable to come to the church)." Marriage in the church, for Christians, is seen as contributing to the fruit of the newlywed couple regularly attending church each Lord's Day and raising children in the faith.

Although many Christian denominations do not perform same-sex marriages, many do, such as the Presbyterian Church (USA), some dioceses of the Episcopal Church, the Metropolitan Community Church, Quakers, United Church of Canada, and United Church of Christ congregations, and some Anglican dioceses. Same-sex marriage is recognized by various religious denominations.

==== Islam ====
Pakistani marriage culture video

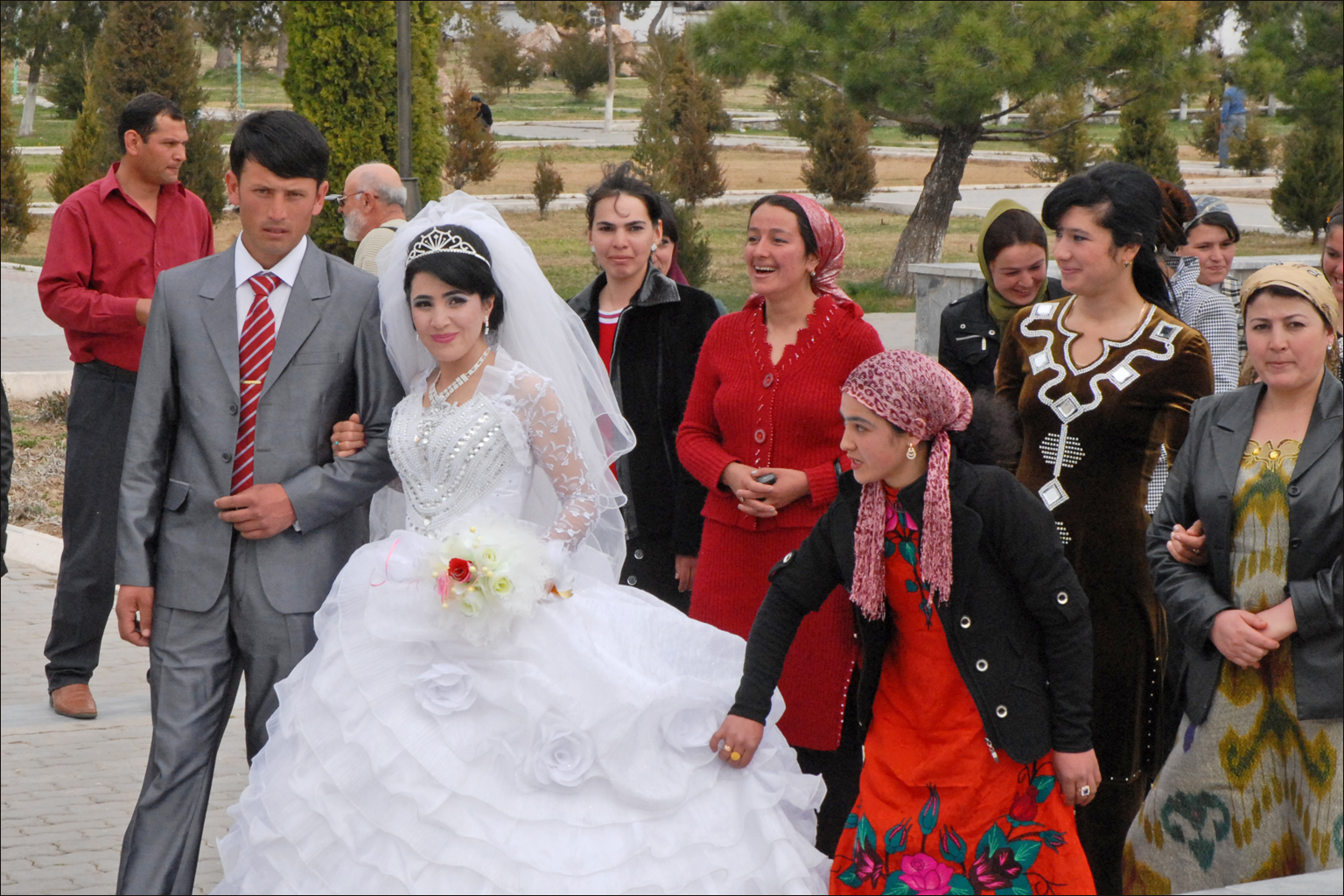
Newlywed couples visit Timur's statues to receive wedding blessings in Uzbekistan.

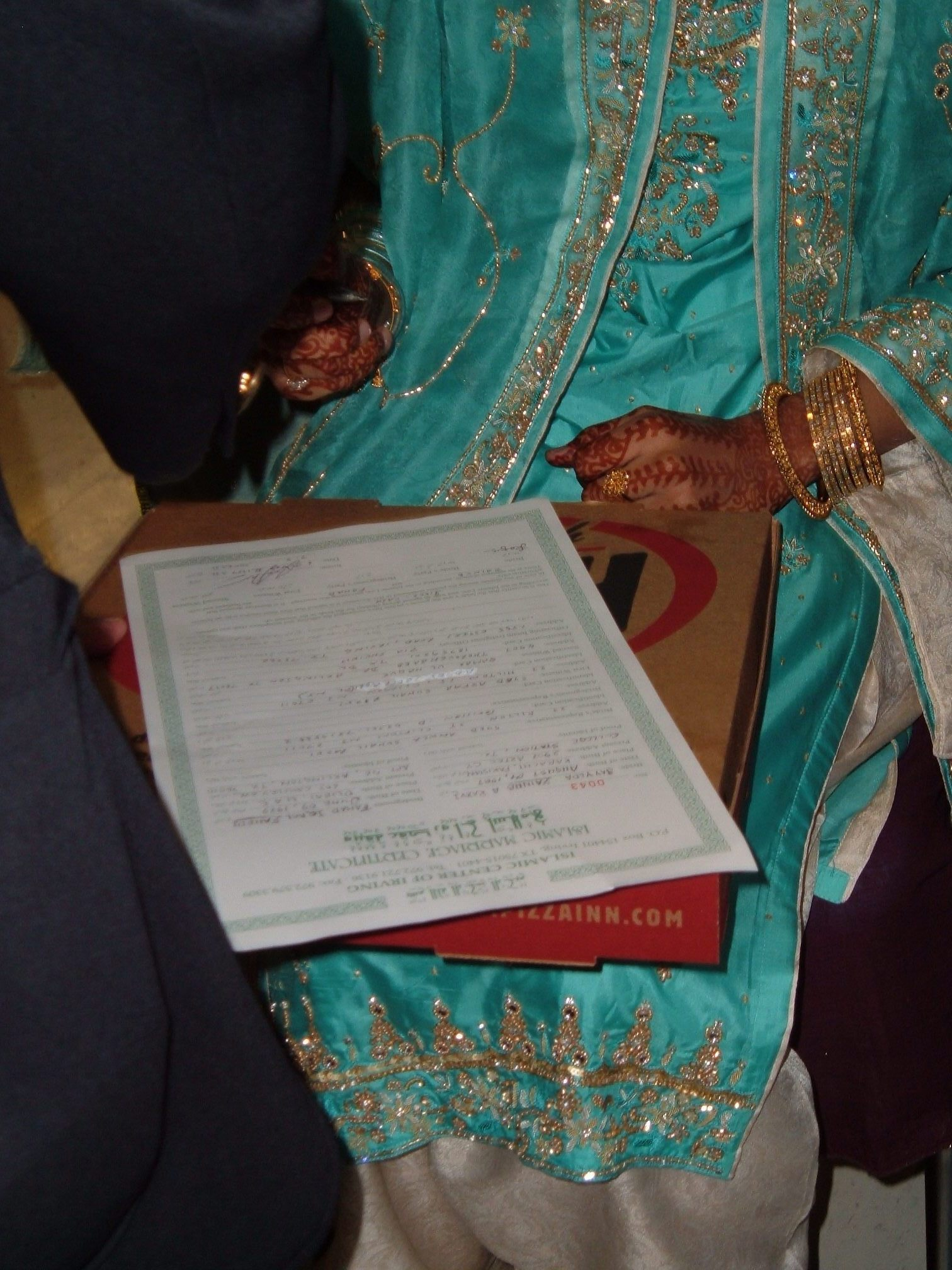
A Muslim bride of Pakistan origin signing the nikkah nama or marriage certificate

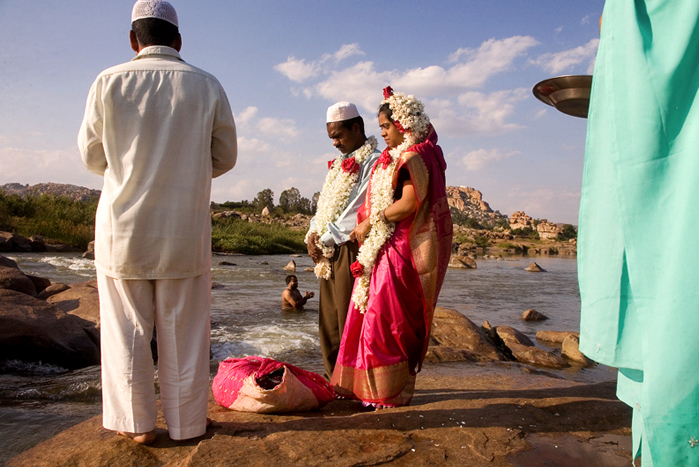
A Muslim couple being wed alongside the Tungabhadra River at Hampi, India

Islam also commends marriage, with the age of marriage being whenever the individuals feel ready, financially and emotionally.

In Islam, polygyny is allowed while polyandry is not, with the specific limitation that a man can have no more than four legal wives at any one time and an unlimited number of female slaves as concubines who may have rights similar wives, with the exception of not being free unless the man has children with them, with the requirement that the man is able and willing to partition his time and wealth equally among the respective wives and concubines (this practice of concubinage, as in Judaism, is not applicable in contemporary times and has been deemed by scholars as invalid due to shifts in views about the role of slavery in the world).

For a Muslim wedding to take place, the bridegroom and the guardian of the bride (wali) must both agree on the marriage. Should the guardian disagree on the marriage, it may not legally take place. If the wali of the girl is her father or paternal grandfather, he has the right to force her into marriage even against her proclaimed will if it is her first marriage, the exercise of this power is, however, very strictly regulated in the interests of the bride. A guardian who is allowed to force the bride into marriage is called wali mujbir. As minors are not in a position to make a declaration of their wishes which is valid in law, they can only be married at all by a wali mudjbir but a woman married in this way by another than her ascendant is entitled on coming of age to demand that her marriage be declared void (faskh) by the qadi.

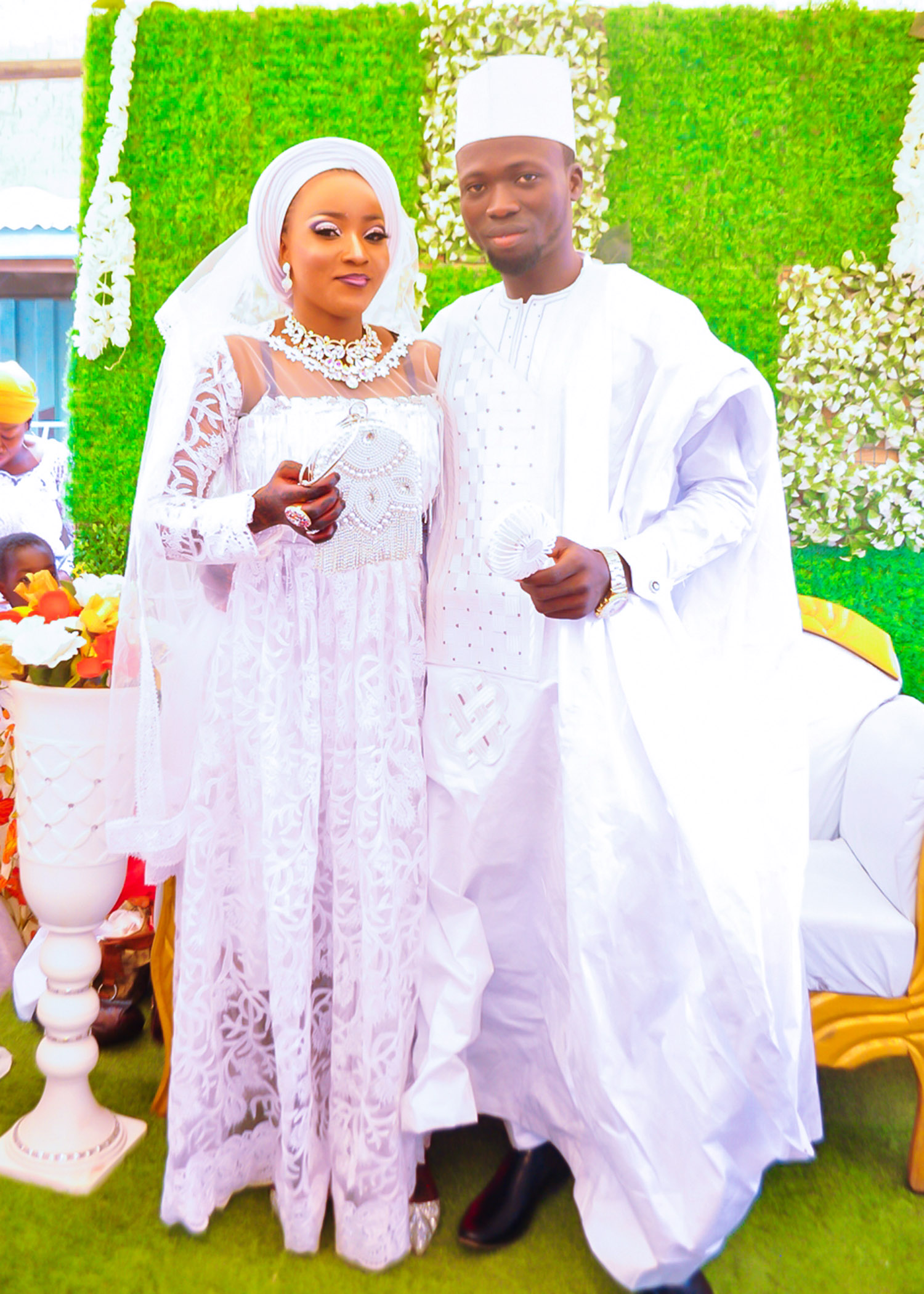
A Nigerian Islamic wedding

From an Islamic (Sharia) law perspective, the minimum requirements and responsibilities in a Muslim marriage are that the groom provide living expenses to the bride, and in return, the bride's main responsibility is raising children to be proper Muslims. All other rights and responsibilities are to be decided between the husband and wife, and may even be included as stipulations in the marriage contract, so long as they do not go against the minimum requirements of the marriage.

In Sunni Islam, marriage must take place in the presence of at least two reliable witnesses, with the consent of the guardian of the bride and the consent of the groom. Following the marriage, the couple may consummate the marriage. To create an 'urf marriage, it is sufficient that a man and a woman indicate an intention to marry each other and recite the requisite words in front of a suitable Muslim. The wedding party usually follows but can be held days, or months later, whenever the couple and their families want to; however, there can be no concealment of the marriage as it is regarded as public notification due to the requirement of witnesses.

In Shia Islam, marriage may take place without the presence of witnesses as is often the case in temporary Nikah mut'ah (prohibited in Sunni Islam), but with the consent of both the bride and the groom. Following the marriage, they may consummate their marriage.

==== Judaism ====
A Jewish wedding, painting by Jozef Israëls, 1903

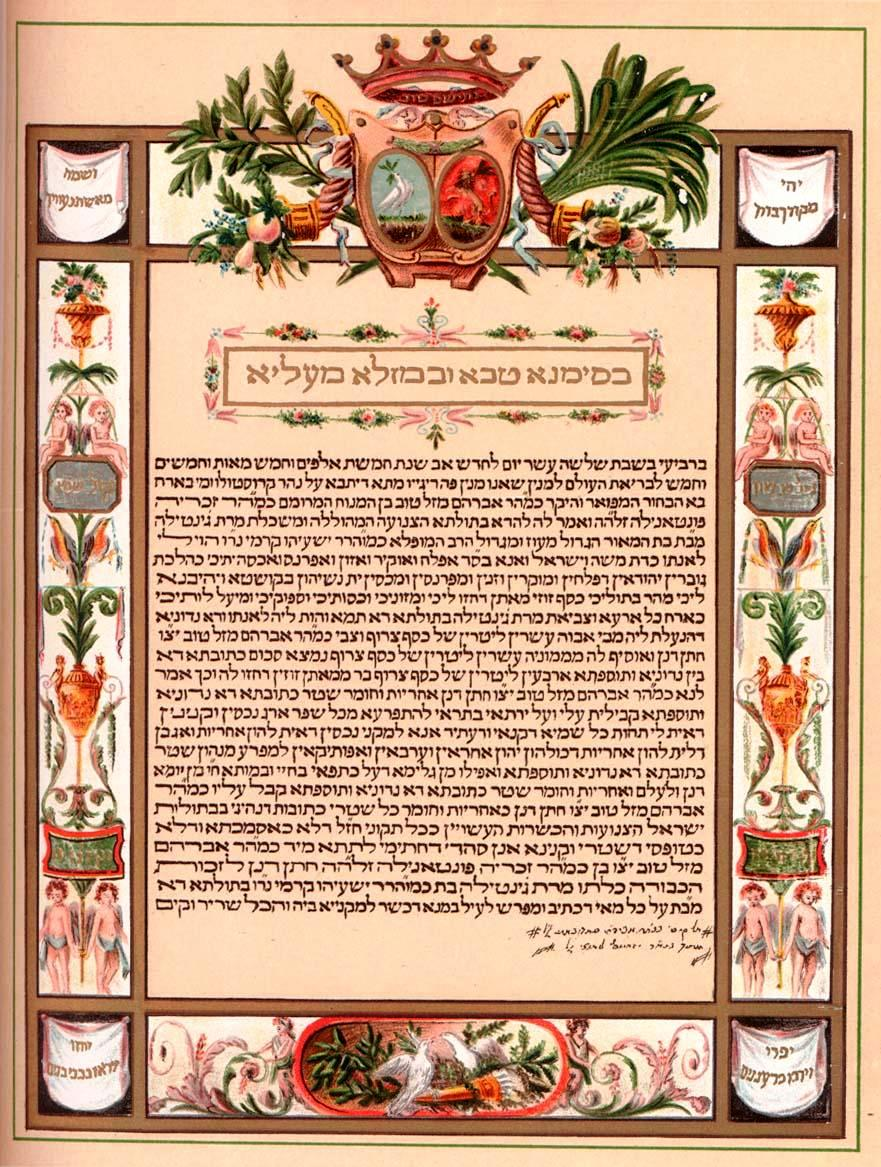
A Ketubah in Hebrew, a Jewish marriage-contract outlining the duties of each partner

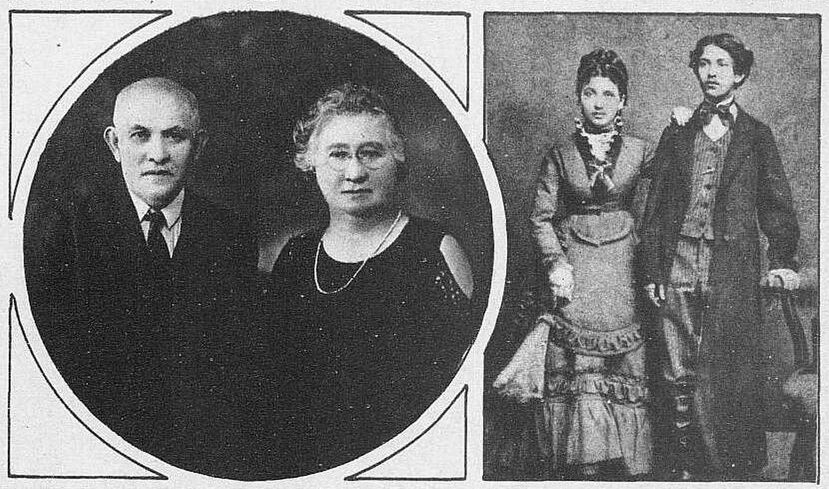
Mr. and Mrs. Hyman Bauman, a Galician Jewish couple, as they appeared on their wedding day in 1876 (right) and a half century later in 1926 (left)

In Judaism, marriage is based on the laws of the Torah and is a contractual bond between spouses in which the spouses agree to be consecrated to one another. This contract is called Kiddushin. Though procreation is not the sole purpose, a Jewish marriage is also expected to fulfill the commandment to have children, as it is written "God blessed them and God said to them, 'Be fertile and increase.'" The main focus centers around the relationship between the spouses. Kabbalistically, marriage is understood to mean that the spouses are merging into a single soul. In Kabbalistic thought, a man is considered "incomplete" if he is not married, as his soul is only one part of a larger whole that remains to be unified.

The Hebrew Bible describes a number of marriages, including those of Isaac, Jacob and Samson. Polygyny, or men having multiple wives at once, is one of the most common marital arrangements represented in the Hebrew Bible; another is that of concubinage (pilagshut) which was often arranged by a man, and a woman who generally enjoyed the same rights as a full legal wife. Other means of concubinage are observed by the author of Judges 19–20, or during war, as in Deuteronomy 21:10–12. The rabbis of the Talmud exhibited discomfort with abduction of women in war for the purpose of marriage, declaring it to be a "compromise against man's evil inclination" to be avoided. Today Ashkenazi Jews are prohibited to take more than one wife because of a ban instituted on this by Gershom ben Judah (d. 1040 CE). However, academic scholarship indicates that prohibitions on polygyny may have existed far earlier, based on the Damascus Covenant.

Among ancient Hebrews, marriage was a domestic affair and not a religious ceremony; no officiant or witness was required by law. The Rambam wrote that "before the Torah was given, when a man would meet a woman in the marketplace and he and she decided to marry, he would bring her home, conduct relations in private and thus make her his wife." Subsequently, to the Torah being handed down at Sinai, however, the Jews received the commandment that a marriage must be witnessed.

Betrothal (erusin), which refers to the time that this binding contract is made, is distinct from marriage itself (nissu'in), with the time between these events varying substantially. In biblical times, a wife was regarded as personal property, belonging to her husband; the descriptions of the Bible suggest that she would be expected to perform tasks such as spinning, sewing, weaving, manufacture of clothing, fetching of water, baking of bread, and animal husbandry. A husband's obligations to his wife are 1) to provide her with food and care; 2) to supply her clothing and shelter; 3) to share a home with her; 4) to provide the ketubah (marriage contract); 5) to supply medical care if she falls ill; 6) to ransom her back if she is kidnapped; 7) to provide proper burial when she dies; 8) to provide for her materially if he predeceases her; 9) to provide for the support of their daughters until they marry or become adults; and 10) to see that their sons inherit the money specified in her ketubah, in addition to their portion of his estate. Men are also obligated sexually to their wives, per BT Ketubot 61b:10, with the frequency of marital relations determined in part by the occupation (and hence availability) of the husband.

Because a wife was regarded as property, her husband was originally free to divorce her for any reason, at any time. However, Talmudic sources complicate this matter significantly, with Beit Shammai stating that a man may divorce his wife only if she has committed a sexual transgression (such as adultery). Divorcing a woman against her will was also banned by Gershom ben Judah for Ashkenazi Jews. A divorced couple were permitted to remarry, unless the wife had married someone else after her divorce.

=== Hinduism ===
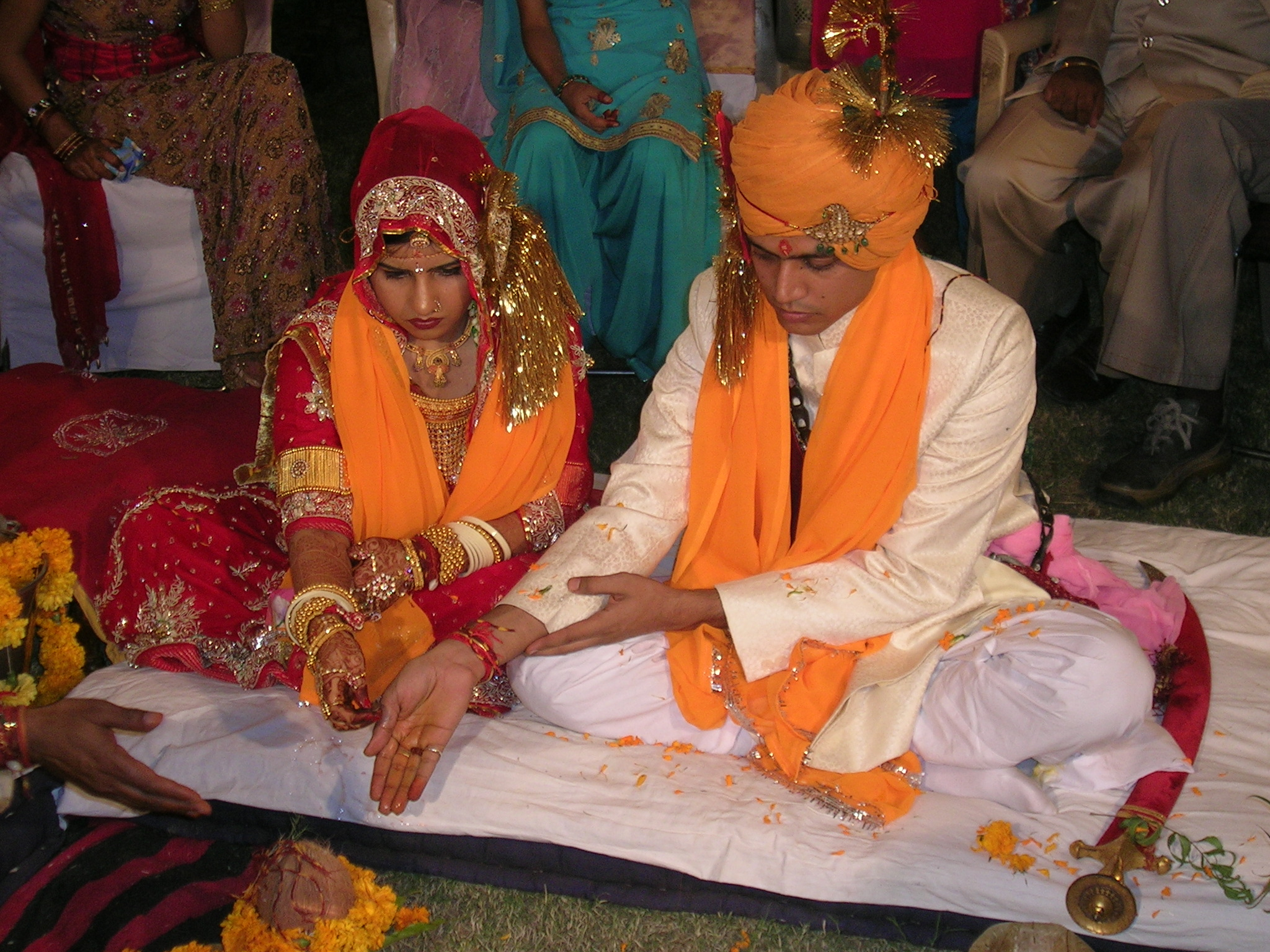
Hindu marriage ceremony from a Rajput wedding

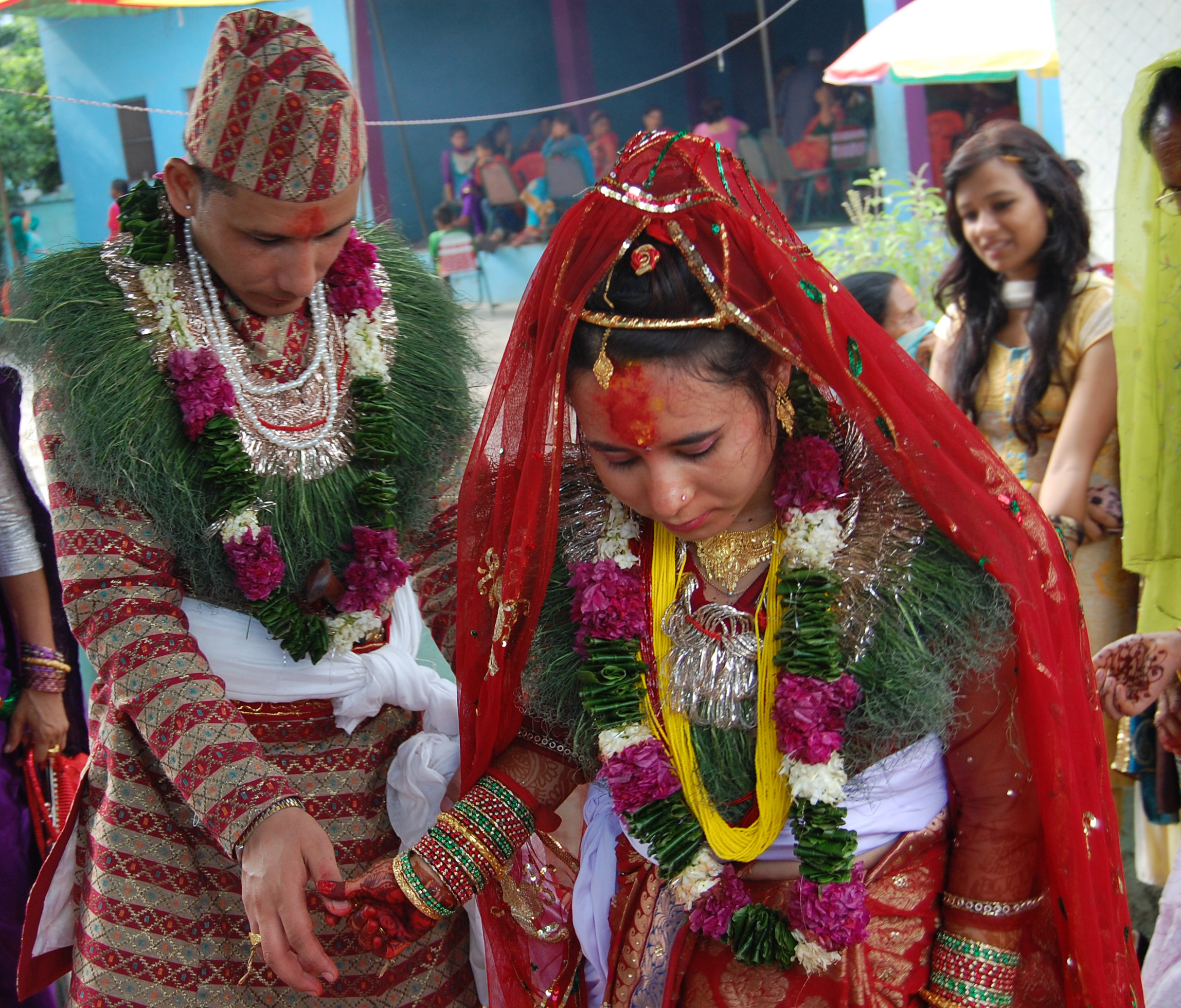
A Nepalese Hindu couple in marriage ceremony

Hinduism regards Vivāha or Biye (marriage) to be a sacred duty that entails both religious and social obligations. It is regarded to be an important samskara, or a rite of passage. Hindu texts describe four purusharthas (goals of existence): dharma (righteousness), artha (wealth), kama (desire), and moksha (liberation). The purpose of the marriage samskara is to fulfill the goal of kama, allowing an adherent to gradually advance towards the attainment of moksha. The Manusmriti describes many different types of marriages and their categorisation, ranging from the gandharva vivaha (a consensual marriage of love between a man and a woman without the performance of rituals or witnesses) to the rakshasa vivaha (a "demoniac" marriage, performed by abduction of one participant by the other participant, usually, but not always, with the help of other persons). In the Indian subcontinent, arranged marriages, in which the spouse's parents or an older family member choose the partner, are still predominant in comparison with love marriages in the contemporary period. The Hindu Widow's Remarriage Act 1856 empowers a Hindu widow to remarry.

=== Buddhism ===
The Buddhist view of marriage considers marriage a secular affair and thus not a sacrament. Buddhists are expected to follow the civil laws regarding marriage laid out by their respective governments. Gautama Buddha, being a kshatriya was required by Shakyan tradition to pass a series of tests to prove himself as a warrior, before he was allowed to marry.

=== Sikhism ===
In a Sikh marriage, the couple walks around the Guru Granth Sahib holy book four times, and a holy man recites from it in the kirtan style. The ceremony is known as 'Anand Karaj' and represents the holy union of two souls united as one.

=== Wicca ===
Wiccan marriages are commonly known as handfastings and are a celebration held by Wiccans. Handfasting was originally a medieval ritual and has been revived by contemporary Pagans. In the ritual, the couple's wrists are tied together to symbolize the binding of two lives. It is commonly used in Wicca and Pagan ceremonies, but it has become more mainstream and comes up in both religious and secular vows and readings. Although handfastings vary for each Wiccan they often involve honoring Wiccan deities. Some Wiccan traditions have a marriage vow "for as long as love lasts" instead of the traditional Christian "till death do us part". The first Wiccan wedding took place in 1960, between Frederic Lamond and his wife, Gillian. Most Wiccan traditions will celebrate same-sex and different-sex handfastings. The length of commitment varies from a year and a day (after which the vows may be renewed), "as long as love shall last", for a lifetime, or for future incarnations.

Consensual sex is considered sacred for Wiccans. Some traditions perform the Great Rite, in which a High Priest and High Priestess invoke the God and Goddess on each other before making love. It can be used to raise magical energy for the use of spell work. It can also be performed symbolically, using the athame to symbolize masculine energy and the chalice to symbolize feminine energy.

== Health ==
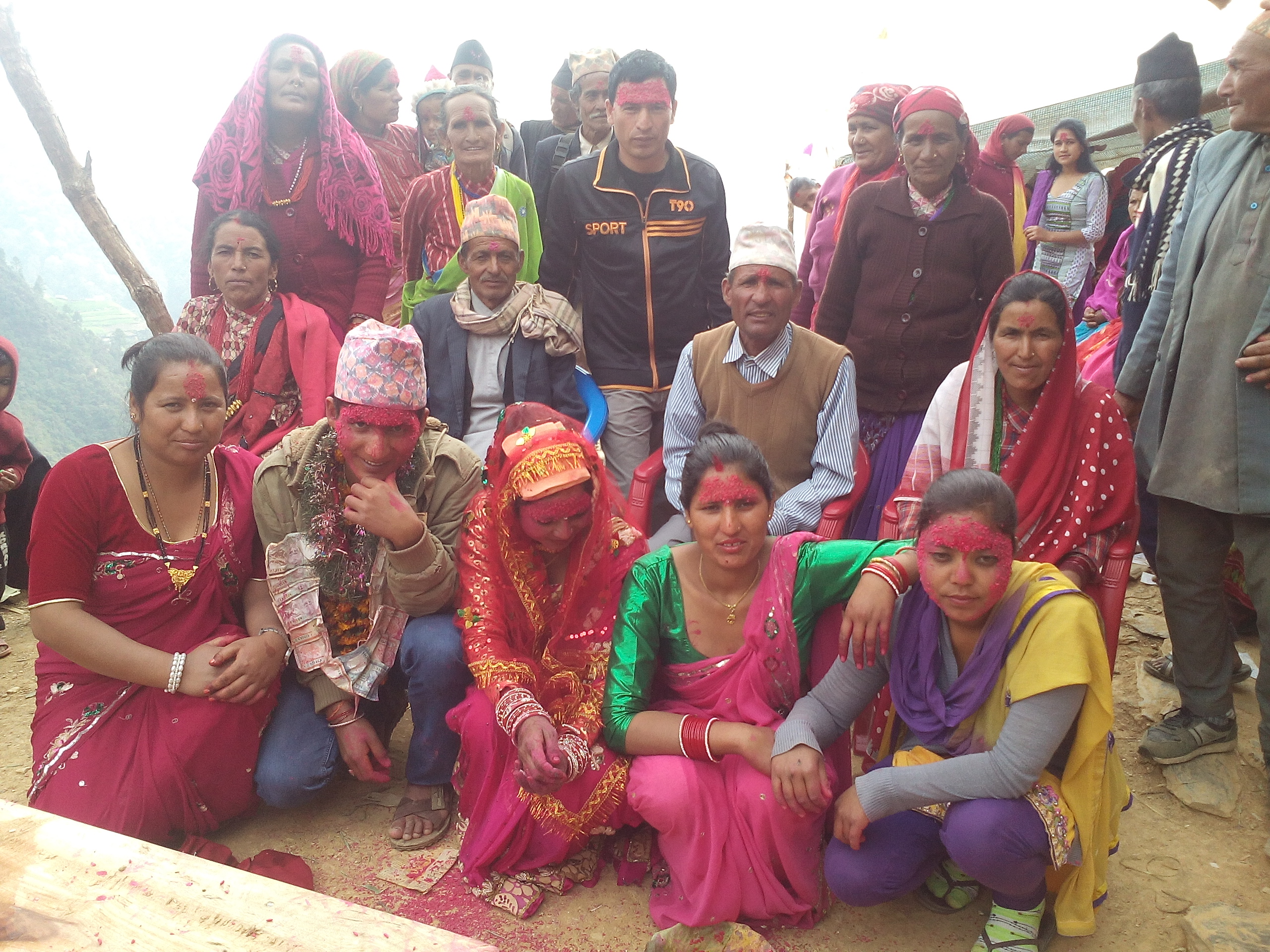
Nepali wedding

Marriage, like other close relationships, exerts considerable influence on health. Married people experience lower morbidity and mortality across such diverse health threats as cancer, heart attacks, and surgery. Research on marriage and health is part of the broader study of the benefits of social relationships.

Social ties provide people with a sense of identity, purpose, belonging, and support. Simply being married, as well as the quality of one's marriage, have been linked to diverse measures of health.

The health-protective effect of marriage is stronger for men than women. Marital status—the simple fact of being married—confers more health benefits to men than women.

Women's health is more strongly impacted than men's by marital conflict or satisfaction, such that unhappily married women do not enjoy better health relative to their single counterparts. Most research on marriage and health has focused on heterosexual couples; more work is needed to clarify the health impacts of same-sex marriage.

== Divorce and annulment ==
In most societies, the death of one of the partners terminates the marriage, and in monogamous societies, this allows the other partner to remarry, though sometimes after a waiting or mourning period.

In some societies, a marriage can be annulled, when an authority declares that a marriage never happened. Jurisdictions often have provisions for void marriages or voidable marriages.

A marriage may also be terminated through divorce. Countries that have relatively recently legalized divorce are Italy (1970), Portugal (1975), Brazil (1977), Spain (1981), Argentina (1987), Paraguay (1991), Colombia (1991), Ireland (1996), Chile (2004) and Malta (2011). The Philippines and the Vatican City are the only jurisdictions which do not allow divorce. After divorce, one spouse may have to pay alimony. Laws concerning divorce and the ease with which a divorce can be obtained vary widely around the world. After a divorce or an annulment, the people concerned are free to remarry (or marry).

A statutory right of two married partners to mutually consent to divorce was enacted in western nations in the mid-20th century. In the United States, no-fault divorce was first enacted in California in 1969 and the final state to legalize it was New York in 1989.

About 45% of marriages in Britain and, according to a 2009 study, 46% of marriages in the U.S. end in divorce.

== History ==
=== Right of sexual access ===
Duran Bell described historical marriage as "a relationship between one or more men (male or female) in severalty to one or more women that provides those men with a demand-right of sexual access within a domestic group and identifies women who bear the obligation of yielding to the demands of those specific men." Currently in many countries the right of sexual access is not legally recognized and instead viewed as marital rape.

=== Ancient world ===
==== Ancient Near East ====
Many cultures have legends concerning the origins of marriage. The way in which a marriage is conducted and its rules and ramifications have changed over time, as has the institution itself, depending on the culture or demographic of the time.

The first recorded evidence of marriage ceremonies uniting a man and a woman dates back to approximately 2350 BC, in ancient Mesopotamia. Wedding ceremonies, as well as dowry and divorce, can be traced back to Mesopotamia and Babylonia.

According to ancient Hebrew tradition, a wife was seen as being property of high value and was, therefore, usually, carefully looked after. Early nomadic communities in the Middle East practiced a form of marriage known as beena, in which a wife would own a tent of her own, within which she retains complete independence from her husband. The Covenant Code orders "If he take him another; her food, her clothing, and her duty of marriage, shall he not diminish (or lessen)". The Talmud interprets this as a requirement for a man to provide food and clothing to, and have sex with, each of his wives. However, "duty of marriage" is also interpreted as whatever one does as a married couple, which is more than just sexual activity. And the term diminish, which means to lessen, shows the man must treat her as if he was not married to another.

As a polygynous society, the Israelites did not have any laws that imposed marital fidelity on men. Adulterous married women, adulterous betrothed women, and the men who slept with them, however, were subject to the death penalty by the biblical laws against adultery. The literary prophets indicate that adultery was a frequent occurrence, despite these legal restrictions.

==== Classical Greece and Rome ====
In ancient Greece, no specific civil ceremony was required for the creation of a heterosexual marriage – only mutual agreement and the fact that the couple must regard each other as husband and wife accordingly. Men usually married when they were in their 20s and women in their teens. It has been suggested that these ages made sense for the Greeks because men were generally done with military service or financially established by their late 20s, and marrying a teenage girl ensured ample time for her to bear children, as life expectancies were significantly lower. Married Greek women had few rights in ancient Greek society and were expected to take care of the house and children. Time was an important factor in Greek marriage. For example, there were superstitions that being married during a full moon was good luck and Greeks married in the winter in honor of Hera. Inheritance was more important than feelings: a woman whose father dies without male heirs could be forced to marry her nearest male relative – even if she had to divorce her husband first.

There were several types of marriages in ancient Roman society. The traditional ("conventional") form called conventio in manum required a ceremony with witnesses and was also dissolved with a ceremony. In this type of marriage, a woman lost her family rights of inheritance of her old family and gained them with her new one. She now was subject to the authority of her husband. There was the free marriage known as sine manu. In this arrangement, the wife remained a member of her original family; she stayed under the authority of her father, kept her family rights of inheritance with her old family and did not gain any with the new family. The minimum age of marriage for girls was 12.

==== Germanic tribes ====
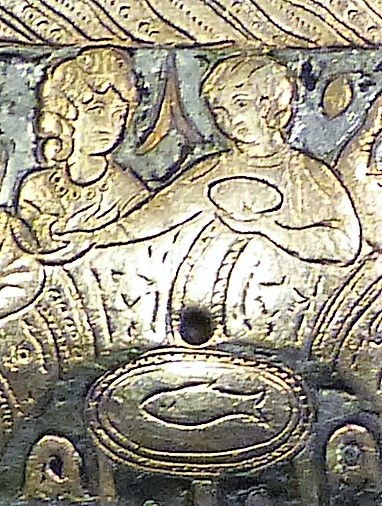
Seuso and his wife

Among ancient Germanic tribes, the bride and groom were roughly the same age and generally older than their Roman counterparts, at least according to Tacitus:

The youths partake late of the pleasures of love, and hence pass the age of puberty unexhausted: nor are the virgins hurried into marriage; the same maturity, the same full growth is required: the sexes unite equally matched and robust, and the children inherit the vigor of their parents.

Where Aristotle had set the prime of life at 37 years for men and 18 for women, the Visigothic Code of law in the 7th century placed the prime of life at 20 years for both men and women, after which both presumably married. Tacitus states that ancient Germanic brides were on average about 20 and were roughly the same age as their husbands. Tacitus, however, had never visited the German-speaking lands and most of his information on Germania comes from secondary sources. In addition, Anglo-Saxon women, like those of other Germanic tribes, are marked as women from the age of 12 and older, based on archaeological finds, implying that the age of marriage coincided with puberty.

=== Europe ===
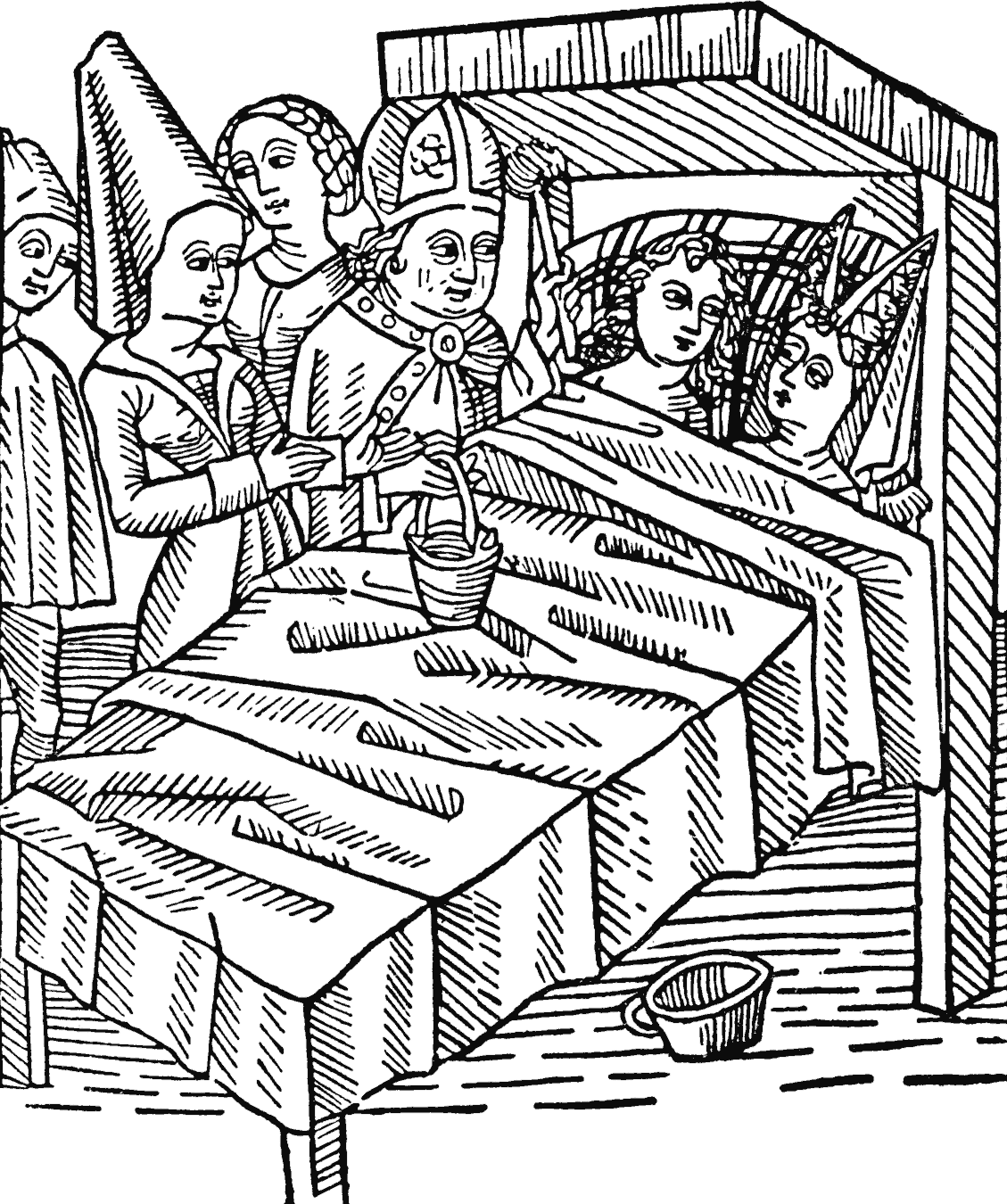
Woodcut. How Reymont and Melusina were betrothed / And by the bishop were blessed in their bed on their wedlock. From the Melusine, 15th century.

From the early Christian era (30 to 325 CE), marriage was thought of as primarily a private matter, with no uniform religious or other ceremony being required. However, bishop Ignatius of Antioch, writing around 110, exhorts, "[I]t becomes both men and women who marry, to form their union with the approval of the bishop, that their marriage may be according to God, and not after their own lust."

In 12th-century Europe, women took the surname of their husbands and starting in the second half of the 16th century parental consent along with the church's consent was required for marriage.

With few local exceptions, until 1545, Christian marriages in Europe were by mutual consent, declaration of intention to marry and upon the subsequent physical union of the parties. The couple would promise verbally to each other that they would be married to each other; the presence of a priest or witnesses was not required. This promise was known as the "verbum." If freely given and made in the present tense (e.g., "I marry you"), it was unquestionably binding; if made in the future tense ("I will marry you"), it would constitute a betrothal.

One of the functions of churches from the Middle Ages was to register marriages, which was not obligatory. There was no state involvement in marriage and personal status, with these issues being adjudicated in ecclesiastical courts. During the Middle Ages marriages were arranged, sometimes as early as birth, and these early pledges to marry were often used to ensure treaties between different royal families, nobles, and heirs of fiefdoms. The church resisted these imposed unions, and increased the number of causes for nullification of these arrangements. As Christianity spread during the Roman period and the Middle Ages, the idea of free choice in selecting marriage partners increased and spread with it. In 1563 the Council of Trent, twenty-fourth session, required that a valid marriage must be performed by a priest before two witnesses.

In medieval Western Europe, later marriage and higher rates of definitive celibacy (the so-called "European marriage pattern") helped to constrain patriarchy at its most extreme level. For example, Medieval England saw marriage age as variable depending on economic circumstances, with couples delaying marriage until the early twenties when times were bad and falling to the late teens after the Black Death, when there were labor shortages; by appearances, marriage of adolescents was not the norm in England. Where the strong influence of classical Celtic and Germanic cultures (which were not rigidly patriarchal) helped to offset the Judaeo-Roman patriarchal influence, in Eastern Europe the tradition of early and universal marriage (often in early adolescence), as well as traditional Slavic patrilocal custom, led to a greatly inferior status of women at all levels of society.

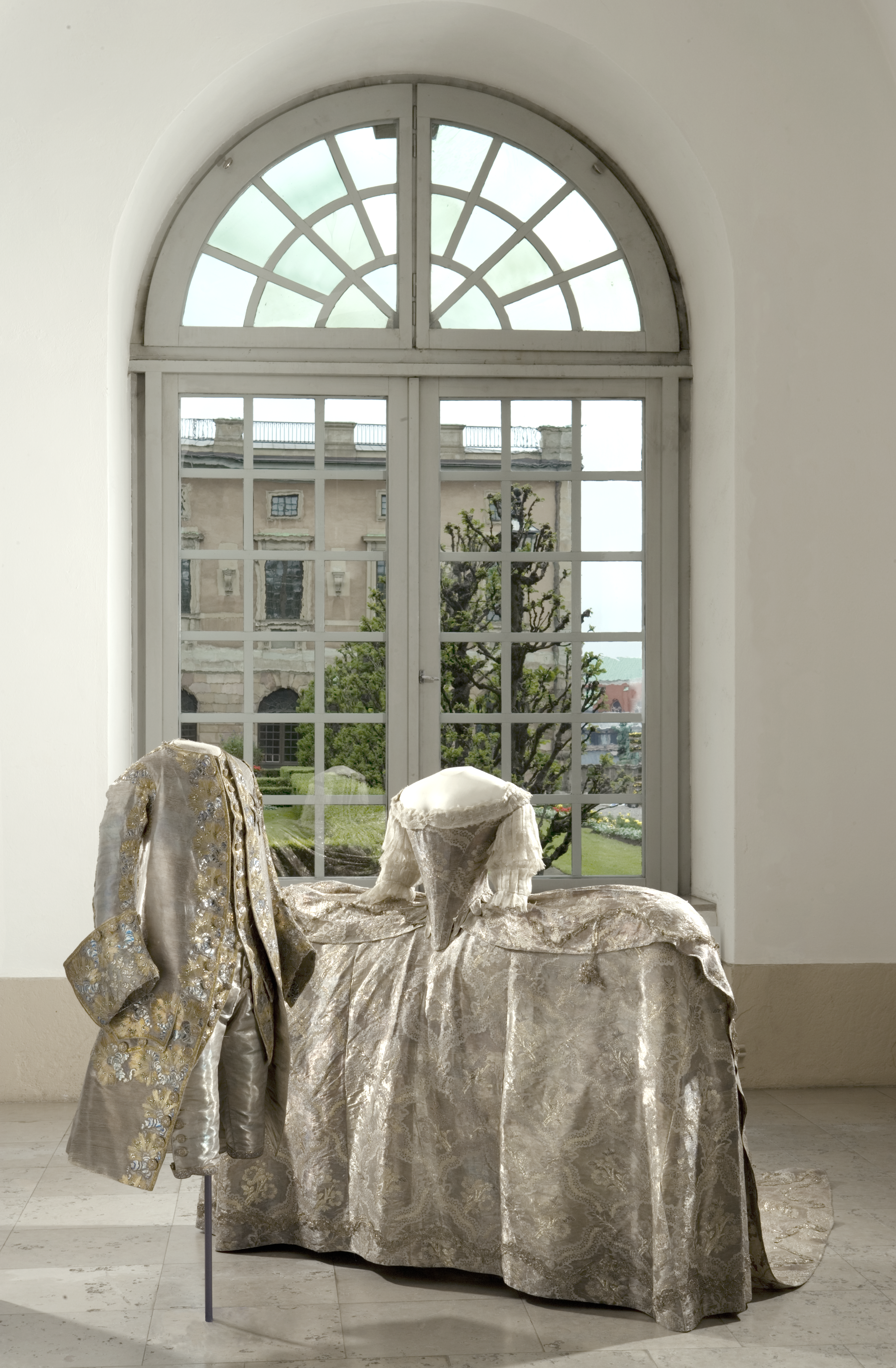
Swedish royal wedding clothes from 1766 at Livrustkammaren in Stockholm

The average age of marriage for most of Northwestern Europe from 1500 to 1800 was around 25 years of age; as the Church dictated that both parties had to be at least 21 years of age to marry without the consent of their parents, the bride and groom were roughly the same age, with most brides in their early twenties and most grooms two or three years older, and a substantial number of women married for the first time in their thirties and forties, particularly in urban areas, with the average age at first marriage rising and falling as circumstances dictated. In better times, more people could afford to marry earlier and thus fertility rose and conversely marriages were delayed or forgone when times were bad, thus restricting family size; after the Black Death, the greater availability of profitable jobs allowed more people to marry young and have more children, but the stabilization of the population in the 16th century meant fewer job opportunities and thus more people delaying marriages.

The age of marriage was not absolute, however, as child marriages occurred throughout the Middle Ages and later, with just some of them including:

- The 1552 CE marriage between John Somerford and Jane Somerford Brereto, at the ages of 3 and 2, respectively.
- In the early 1900s, Magnus Hirschfeld surveyed the age of consent in about 50 countries, which he found to often range between 12 and 16. In the Vatican, the age of consent was 12.

As part of the Protestant Reformation, the role of recording marriages and setting the rules for marriage passed to the state, reflecting Martin Luther's view that marriage was a "worldly thing". By the 17th century, many of the Protestant European countries had a state involvement in marriage.

In England, under the Anglican Church, marriage by consent and cohabitation was valid until the passage of Marriage Act 1753. This act instituted certain requirements for marriage, including the performance of a religious ceremony observed by witnesses.

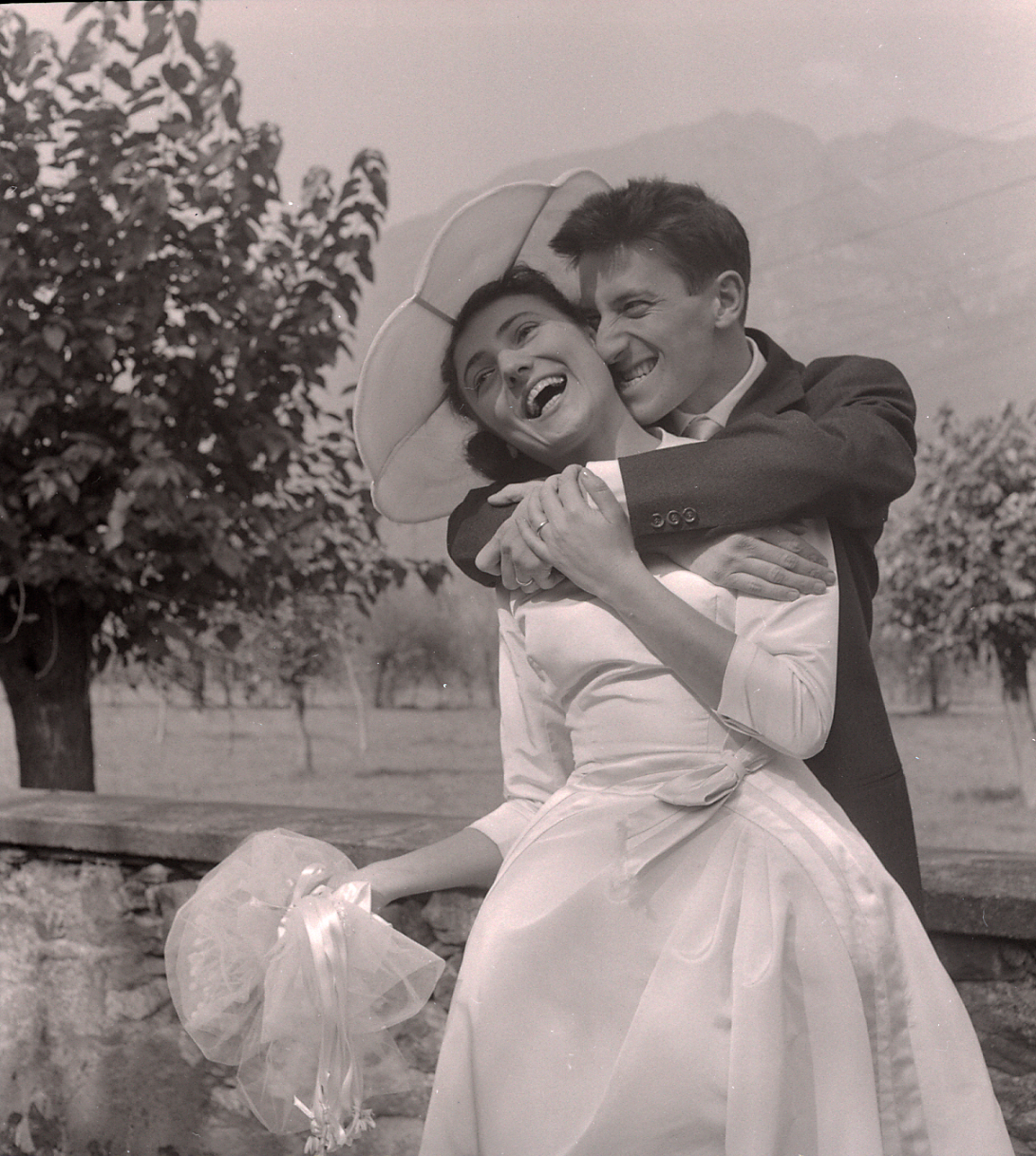
A marriage in 1960 in Italy. Photo by Paolo Monti.

As part of the Counter-Reformation, in 1563 the Council of Trent decreed that a Roman Catholic marriage would be recognized only if the marriage ceremony was officiated by a priest with two witnesses. The council also authorized a Catechism, issued in 1566, which defined marriage as "The conjugal union of man and woman, contracted between two qualified persons, which obliges them to live together throughout life."

In the early modern period, John Calvin and his Protestant colleagues reformulated Christian marriage by enacting the Marriage Ordinance of Geneva, which imposed "The dual requirements of state registration and church consecration to constitute marriage" for recognition.

In England and Wales, Lord Hardwicke's Marriage Act 1753 required a formal ceremony of marriage, thereby curtailing the practice of Fleet Marriage, an irregular or a clandestine marriage. From the 1690s until the Marriage Act 1753 as many as 300,000 clandestine marriages were performed at Fleet Prison alone. The act required a marriage ceremony to be officiated by an Anglican priest in the Anglican Church with two witnesses and registration. The act did not apply to Jewish marriages or those of Quakers, whose marriages continued to be governed by their own customs.

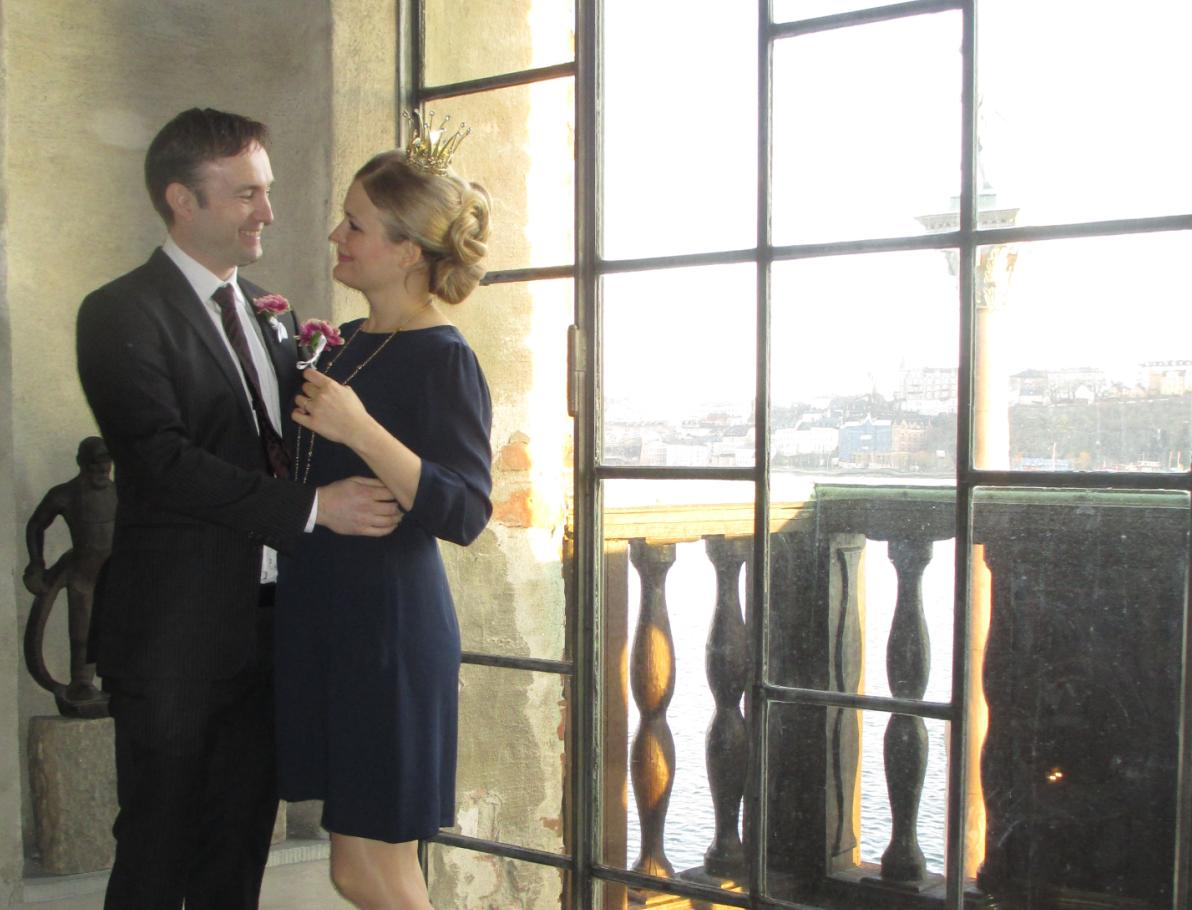
Newlyweds after a civil ceremony in the tower of Stockholm City Hall in 2016

In England and Wales, since 1837, civil marriages have been recognized as a legal alternative to church marriages under the Marriage Act 1836. In Germany, civil marriages were recognized in 1875. This law permitted a declaration of the marriage before an official clerk of the civil administration, when both spouses affirm their will to marry, to constitute a legally recognized valid and effective marriage, and allowed an optional private clerical marriage ceremony.

In contemporary English common law, a marriage is a voluntary contract by a man and a woman, in which by agreement they choose to become husband and wife. Edvard Westermarck proposed that "the institution of marriage has probably developed out of a primeval habit".

Since the late twentieth century, major social changes in Western countries have led to changes in the demographics of marriage, with the age of first marriage increasing, fewer people marrying, and more couples choosing to cohabit rather than marry. For example, the number of marriages in Europe decreased by 30% from 1975 to 2005. As of 2000, the average marriage age range was 25–44 years for men and 22–39 years for women.

=== China ===
The mythological origin of Chinese marriage is a story about Nüwa and Fu Xi who invented proper marriage procedures after becoming married. In ancient Chinese society, people of the same surname are supposed to consult with their family trees prior to marriage to reduce the potential risk of unintentional incest. Marrying one's maternal relatives was generally not thought of as incest. Families sometimes intermarried from one generation to another. Over time, Chinese people became more geographically mobile. Individuals remained members of their biological families. When a couple died, the husband and the wife were buried separately in the respective clan's graveyard. In a maternal marriage, a male would become a son-in-law who lived in the wife's home.

The New Marriage Law of 1950 radically changed Chinese marriage traditions, enforcing monogamy, equality of men and women, and choice in marriage; arranged marriages were the most common type of marriage in China until then. Starting October 2003, it became legal to marry or divorce without authorization from the couple's work units. Although people with infectious diseases such as AIDS may now marry, marriage is still illegal for the mentally ill.

=== Korea ===
The practice of matrilocality in Korea started in the Goguryeo period and ended in the early Joseon period. The Korean saying that when a man gets married, he is "entering jangga" (the house of his father-in-law), stems from the Goguryeo period.

== Criticism of marriage ==
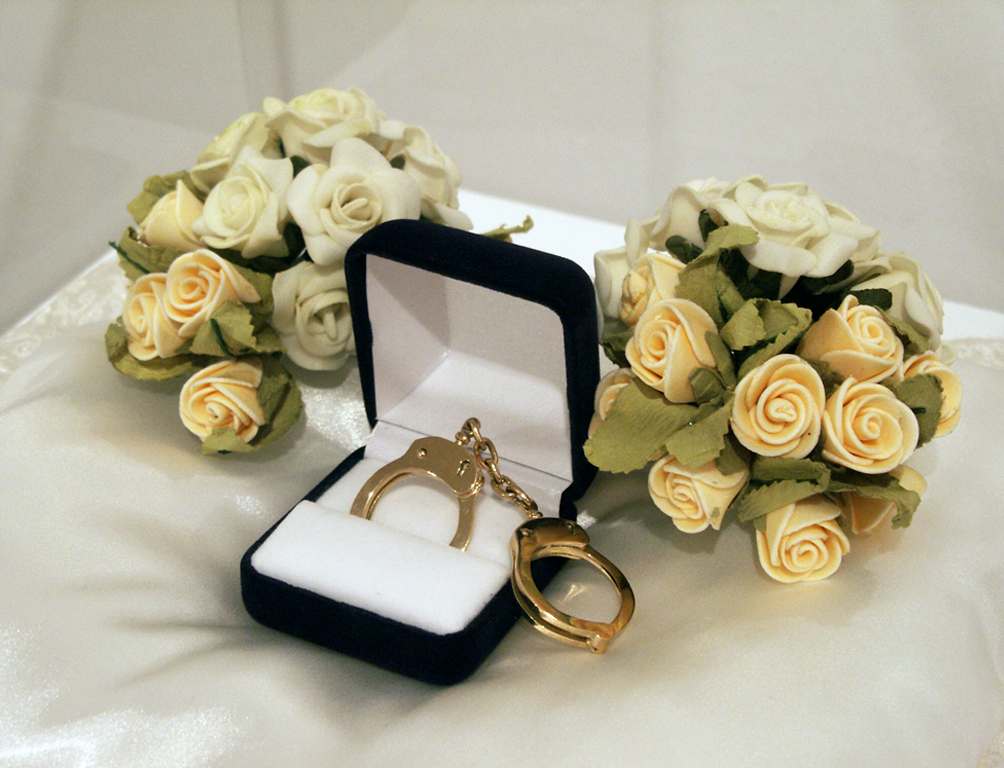
"Esposas de Matrimonio" ("Wedding Cuffs"), a wedding ring sculpture expressing the criticism of marriages' effects on individual liberty. Esposas is a play on Spanish, in which the singular form of the word esposa refers to a spouse, and the plural refers to handcuffs.

People have proposed arguments against marriage for reasons that include political, philosophical and religious criticisms; concerns about the divorce rate; individual liberty and gender equality; questioning the necessity of having a personal relationship sanctioned by government or religious authorities; or the promotion of celibacy for religious or philosophical reasons. Research has found that unhappily married couples are at 3–25 times the risk of developing clinical depression. Opinion polls show the importance of marriage varies by country and culture.

=== Power and gender roles ===
Countries where married women are required by law to obey their husbands as of 2023

Historically, in most cultures, married women had very few rights of their own, being considered, along with the family's children, the property of the husband; as such, they could not own or inherit property, or represent themselves legally (see, for example, coverture). Since the late 19th century, in some (primarily Western) countries, marriage has undergone gradual legal changes, aimed at improving the rights of the wife. These changes included giving wives legal identities of their own, abolishing the right of husbands to physically discipline their wives, giving wives property rights, liberalizing divorce laws, providing wives with reproductive rights of their own, and requiring a wife's consent when sexual relations occur. In the 21st century, there continue to be controversies regarding the legal status of married women, legal acceptance of or leniency towards violence within marriage (especially sexual violence), traditional marriage customs such as dowry and bride price, forced marriage, marriageable age, and criminalization of consensual behaviors such as premarital and extramarital sex.

Feminist theory approaches opposite-sex marriage as an institution traditionally rooted in patriarchy that promotes male superiority and power over women. This power dynamic conceptualizes men as "the provider operating in the public sphere" and women as "the caregivers operating within the private sphere". "Theoretically, women ... [were] defined as the property of their husbands .... The adultery of a woman was always treated with more severity than that of a man." "[F]eminist demands for a wife's control over her own property were not met [in parts of Britain] until ... [laws were passed in the late 19th century]."

Traditional heterosexual marriage imposed an obligation of the wife to be sexually available for her husband and an obligation of the husband to provide material/financial support for the wife. Numerous philosophers, feminists and other academic figures have commented on this throughout history, condemning the hypocrisy of legal and religious authorities in regard to sexual issues; pointing to the lack of choice of a woman in regard to controlling her own sexuality; and drawing parallels between marriage, an institution promoted as sacred, and prostitution, widely condemned and vilified (though often tolerated as a "necessary evil"). Mary Wollstonecraft, in the 18th century, described marriage as "legal prostitution". Bertrand Russell in his book Marriage and Morals wrote that: "Marriage is for woman the commonest mode of livelihood, and the total amount of undesired sex endured by women is probably greater in marriage than in prostitution." Angela Carter in Nights at the Circus wrote: "What is marriage but prostitution to one man instead of many?"

Some critics object to what they see as propaganda in relation to marriage – from the government, religious organizations, the media – which aggressively promote marriage as a solution for all social problems; such propaganda includes, for instance, marriage promotion in schools, where children, especially girls, are bombarded with positive information about marriage, being presented only with the information prepared by authorities.

The performance of dominant gender roles by men and submissive gender roles by women influence the power dynamic of a heterosexual marriage. In some American households, women internalize gender role stereotypes and often assimilate into the role of "wife", "mother", and "caretaker" in conformity to societal norms and their male partner. Author bell hooks states "within the family structure, individuals learn to accept sexist oppression as 'natural' and are primed to support other forms of oppression, including heterosexist domination." "[T]he cultural, economic, political and legal supremacy of the husband" was "[t]raditional ... under English law". This patriarchal dynamic is contrasted with a conception of egalitarian or peer marriage in which power and labour are divided equally, and not according to gender roles.

In the US, studies have shown that, despite egalitarian ideals being common, less than half of respondents viewed their opposite-sex relationships as equal in power, with unequal relationships being more commonly dominated by the male partner. Studies also show that married couples find the highest level of satisfaction in egalitarian relationships and lowest levels of satisfaction in wife dominate relationships. In recent years, egalitarian or peer marriages have been receiving increasing focus and attention politically, economically and culturally in a number of countries, including the United States.

In 2003, over 180,000 immigrants were admitted to the U.S. as spouses of U.S. citizens.

=== Extra-marital sex ===
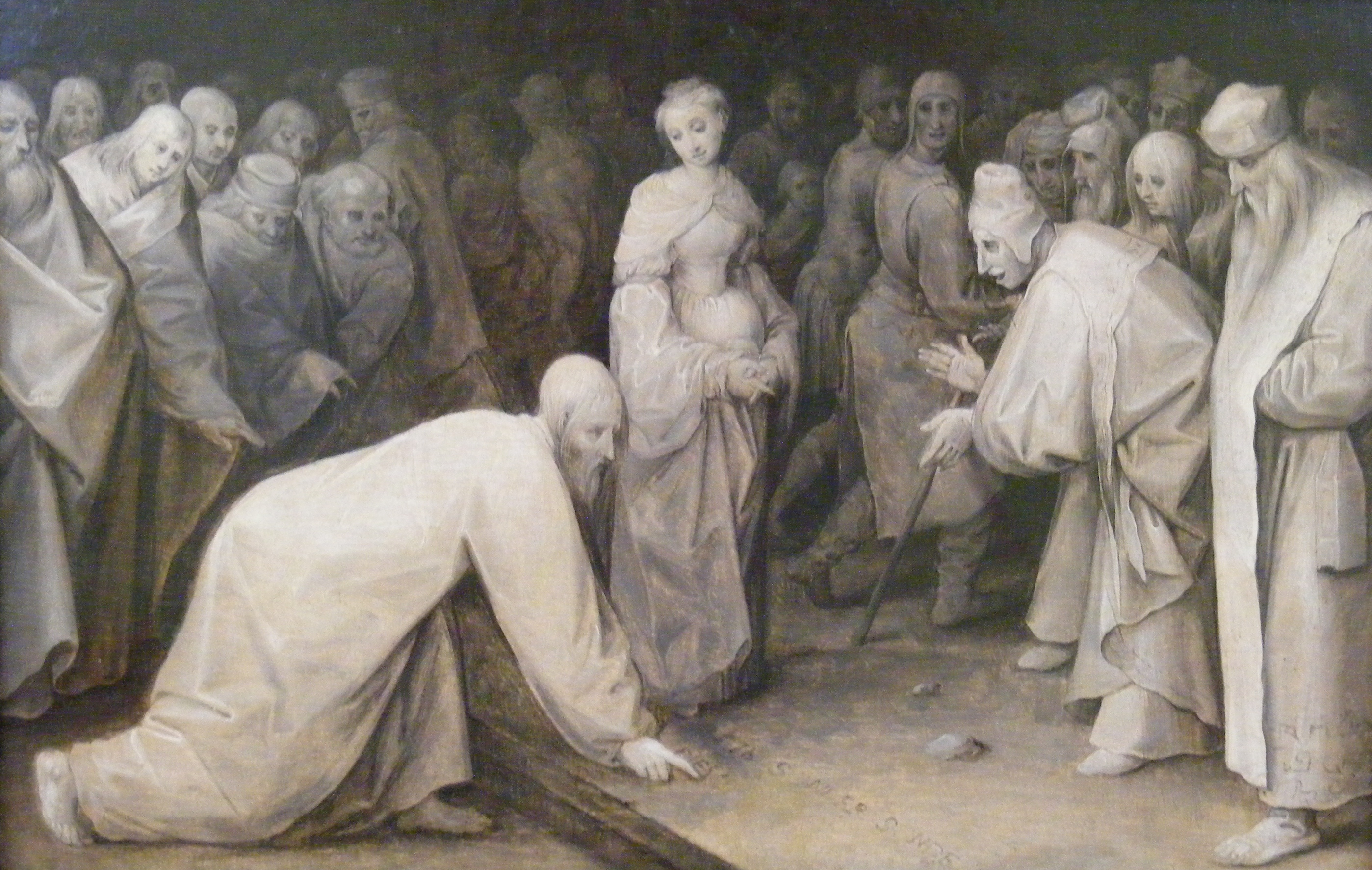
Christ and the woman taken in adultery by Jan Brueghel the Elder, Pinakothek

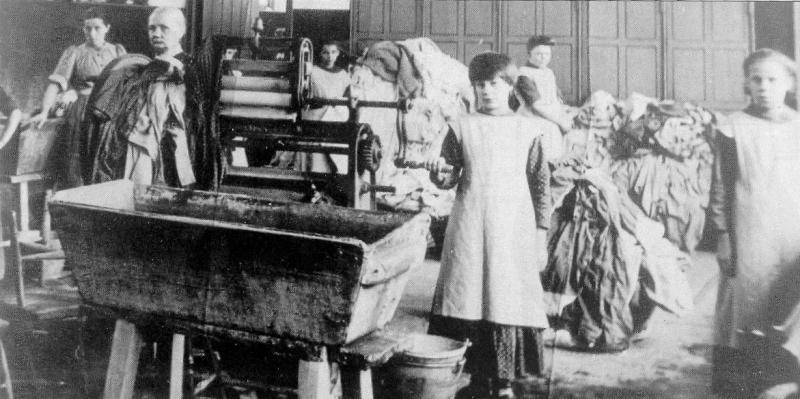
Magdalene laundries were institutions that existed from the 18th to the late 20th centuries, throughout Europe and North America, where "fallen women", including unmarried mothers, were detained. Photo: Magdalene laundry in Ireland, ca. early 20th century.

Different societies demonstrate variable tolerance of extramarital sex. The Standard Cross-Cultural Sample describes the occurrence of extramarital sex by gender in over 50 pre-industrial cultures. The occurrence of extramarital sex by men is described as "universal" in 6 cultures, "moderate" in 29 cultures, "occasional" in 6 cultures, and "uncommon" in 10 cultures. The occurrence of extramarital sex by women is described as "universal" in 6 cultures, "moderate" in 23 cultures, "occasional" in 9 cultures, and "uncommon" in 15 cultures. Three studies using nationally representative samples in the United States found that between 10 and 15% of women and 20–25% of men engage in extramarital sex.

Many of the world's major religions look with disfavor on sexual relations outside marriage. In some non-secular Islamic countries, there are criminal penalties for sexual intercourse before marriage. Sexual relations by a married person with someone other than his/her spouse is known as adultery. Adultery is considered in many jurisdictions to be a crime and grounds for divorce.

In some countries, such as Saudi Arabia, Pakistan, Afghanistan, Iran, Kuwait, Maldives, Morocco, Oman, Mauritania, United Arab Emirates, Sudan, Yemen, any form of sexual activity outside marriage is illegal.

In some parts of the world, women and girls accused of having sexual relations outside marriage are at risk of becoming victims of honor killings committed by their families. In 2011 several people were sentenced to death by stoning after being accused of adultery in Iran, Somalia, Afghanistan, Sudan, Mali and Pakistan. Practices such as honor killings and stoning continue to be supported by mainstream politicians and other officials in some countries. In Pakistan, after the 2008 Balochistan honour killings in which five women were killed by tribesmen of the Umrani Tribe of Balochistan, Pakistani Federal Minister for Postal Services Israr Ullah Zehri defended the practice.

In some places, like Morocco, unmarried girls and women who are raped are often forced by their families to marry their rapist. Because being the victim of rape and losing virginity carry extreme social stigma, and the victims are deemed to have their "reputation" tarnished, a marriage with the rapist is arranged. This is claimed to be in the advantage of both the victim – who does not remain unmarried and does not lose social status – and of the rapist, who avoids punishment. In 2012, after a Moroccan 16-year-old girl committed suicide after having been forced by her family to marry her rapist and enduring further abuse by the rapist after they married, there have been protests from activists against this practice which is common in Morocco.

In some societies, the very high social and religious importance of marital fidelity, especially female fidelity, has as result the criminalization of adultery, often with harsh penalties such as stoning or flogging; as well as leniency towards punishment of violence related to infidelity (such as honor killings). In the 21st century, criminal laws against adultery have become controversial with international organizations calling for their abolition. Opponents of adultery laws argue that these laws are a major contributor to discrimination and violence against women, as they are enforced selectively mostly against women; that they prevent women from reporting sexual violence; and that they maintain social norms which justify violent crimes committed against women by husbands, families and communities. A Joint Statement by the United Nations Working Group on discrimination against women in law and in practice states that "Adultery as a criminal offence violates women's human rights". Some human rights organizations argue that the criminalization of adultery also violates internationally recognized protections for private life, as it represents an arbitrary interference with an individual's privacy, which is not permitted under international law.

=== Marital rape ===
An issue that is a serious concern regarding marriage and which has been the object of international scrutiny is that of marital rape. Throughout much of the history, in most cultures, sex in marriage was considered a 'right', that could be taken by force (often by a man from a woman), if 'denied'. As the concept of human rights started to develop in the 20th century, and with the arrival of second-wave feminism, such views, and laws, have become less widely held.

The legal and social concept of marital rape has developed in most industrialized countries in the mid- to late 20th century; in many other parts of the world it is not recognized as a form of abuse, socially or legally. Several countries in Eastern Europe and Scandinavia made marital rape illegal before 1970, and other countries in Western Europe and the English-speaking Western world outlawed it in the 1980s and 1990s. In England and Wales, marital rape was made illegal in 1991. Although marital rape is being increasingly criminalized in developing countries too, cultural, religious, and traditional ideologies about "conjugal rights" remain very strong in many parts of the world; and even where countries may have adequate laws against rape in marriage, these laws may rarely be enforced.

=== Laws, human rights, and gender status ===
The laws surrounding heterosexual marriage in many countries have come under international scrutiny because they contradict international standards of human rights; institutionalize violence against women, child marriage and forced marriage; require the permission of a husband for his wife to work in a paid job, sign legal documents, file criminal charges against someone, sue in civil court etc.; sanction the use by husbands of violence to "discipline" their wives; and discriminate against women in divorce.

Such things were legal even in many Western countries until recently: for instance, in France, married women obtained the right to work without their husband's permission in 1965, and in West Germany women obtained this right in 1977 (by comparison women in East Germany had many more rights). In Spain, during Franco's era, a married woman needed her husband's consent, referred to as the permiso marital, for almost all economic activities, including employment, ownership of property, and even traveling away from home; the permiso marital was abolished in 1975.

Submission of a wife to her husband is accepted as natural in many parts of the world such as the West, Pakistan, Iran, South Africa, Chaoshan, and Lagos State. Throughout history, and still today in many countries, laws have provided for extenuating circumstances, partial or complete defenses, for men who killed their wives due to adultery, with such acts often being seen as crimes of passion and being covered by legal defenses such as provocation or defense of family honor.

=== Right and ability to divorce ===
While international law and conventions recognize the need for consent for entering a marriage – namely that people cannot be forced to get married against their will – the right to obtain a divorce is not recognized; therefore holding a person in a marriage against their will (if such person has consented to entering in it) is not considered a violation of human rights, with the issue of divorce being left at the appreciation of individual states.

In the EU, the last country to allow divorce was Malta, in 2011. Around the world, the only countries to forbid divorce are Philippines and Vatican City, although in practice in many countries which use a fault-based divorce system obtaining a divorce is very difficult. The ability to divorce, in law and practice, has been and continues to be a controversial issue in many countries, and public discourse involves different ideologies such as feminism, social conservatism, religious interpretations.

=== Dowry and bridewealth ===
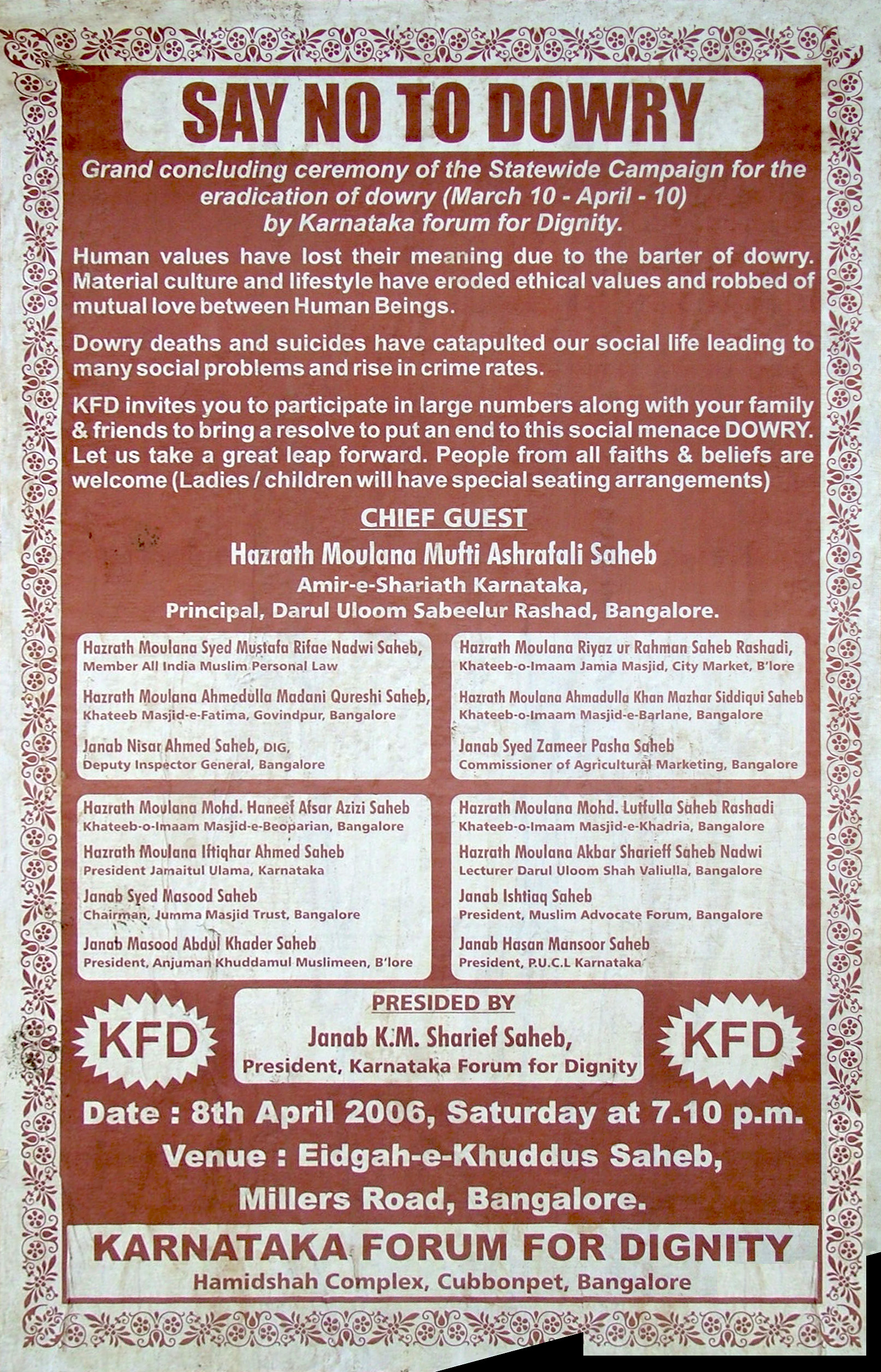
Anti-dowry poster in Bangalore, India

In recent years, the customs of dowry and bride price have received international criticism for inciting conflicts between families and clans; contributing to violence against women; promoting materialism; increasing property crimes (where men steal goods such as cattle in order to be able to pay the bride price); and making it difficult for poor people to marry. African women's rights campaigners advocate the abolishing of bride price, which they argue is based on the idea that women are a form of property which can be bought. Bride price has also been criticized for contributing to child trafficking as impoverished parents sell their young daughters to rich older men. A senior Papua New Guinea police officer has called for the abolishing of bride price arguing that it is one of the main reasons for the mistreatment of women in that country. The opposite practice of dowry has been linked to a high level of violence (see Dowry death) and to crimes such as extortion.

=== Children born outside marriage ===
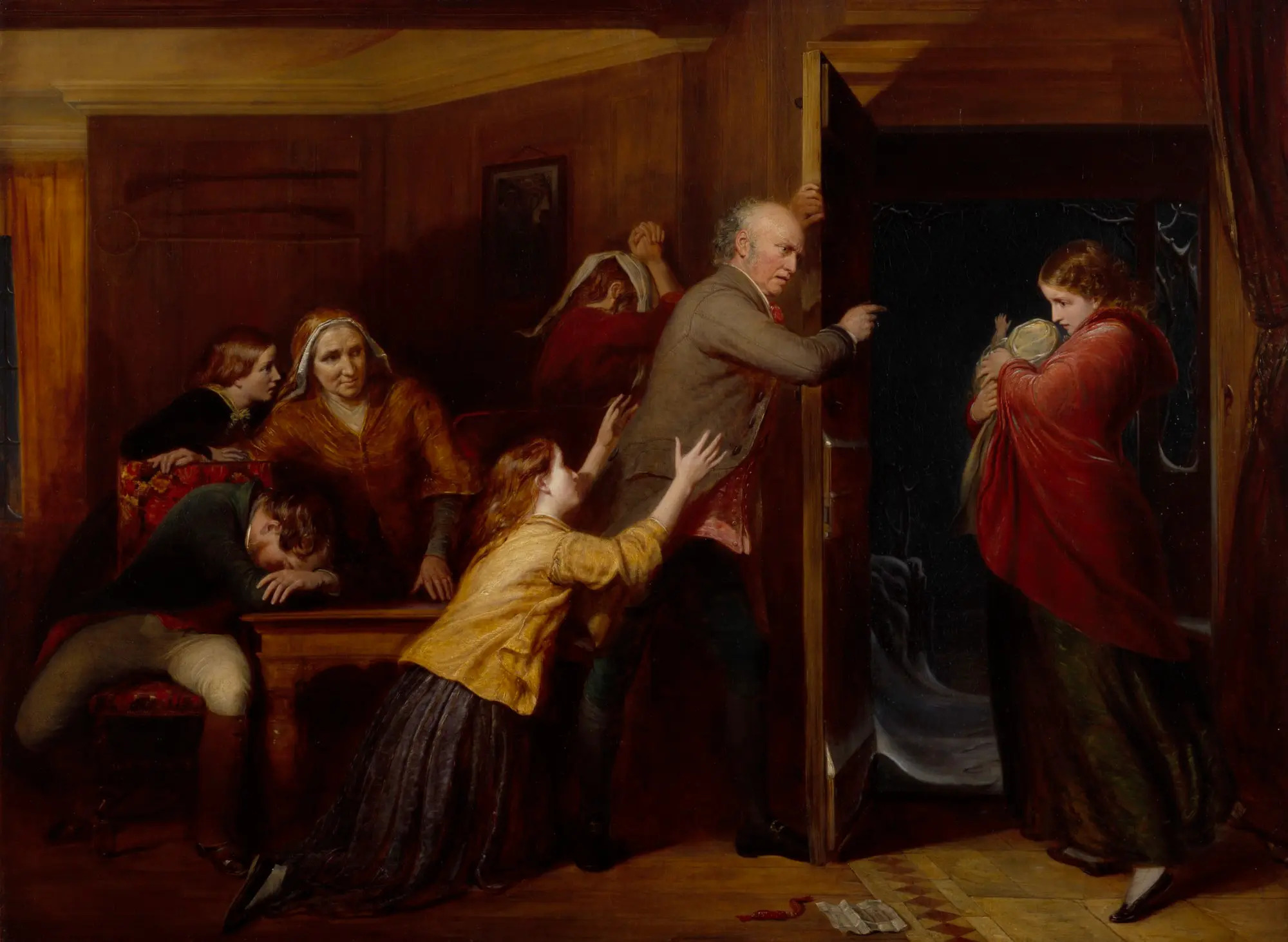
The Outcast, by Richard Redgrave, 1851. A patriarch casts his daughter and her illegitimate baby out of the family home.

Percentage of births to unmarried women, selected countries, 1980 and 2007

Historically, and still in many countries, children born outside marriage suffered severe social stigma and discrimination. In England and Wales, such children were known as bastards and whoresons.

There are significant differences between world regions in regard to the social and legal position of non-marital births, ranging from being fully accepted and uncontroversial to being severely stigmatized and discriminated.

The 1975 European Convention on the Legal Status of Children Born out of Wedlock protects the rights of children born to unmarried parents. The convention states, among others, that: "The father and mother of a child born out of wedlock shall have the same obligation to maintain the child as if it were born in wedlock" and that "A child born out of wedlock shall have the same right of succession in the estate of its father and its mother and of a member of its father's or mother's family, as if it had been born in wedlock."

While in most Western countries legal inequalities between children born inside and outside marriage have largely been abolished, this is not the case in some parts of the world.

The legal status of an unmarried father differs greatly from country to country. Without voluntary formal recognition of the child by the father, in most cases there is a need of due process of law in order to establish paternity. In some countries however, unmarried cohabitation of a couple for a specific period of time does create a presumption of paternity similar to that of formal marriage. This is the case in Australia. Under what circumstances can a paternity action be initiated, the rights and responsibilities of a father once paternity has been established (whether he can obtain parental responsibility and whether he can be forced to support the child) as well as the legal position of a father who voluntarily acknowledges the child, vary widely by jurisdiction. A special situation arises when a married woman has a child by a man other than her husband. Some countries, such as Israel, refuse to accept a legal challenge of paternity in such a circumstance, in order to avoid the stigmatization of the child (see Mamzer, a concept under Jewish law). In 2010, the European Court of Human Rights ruled in favor of a German man who had fathered twins with a married woman, granting him right of contact with the twins, despite the fact that the mother and her husband had forbidden him to see the children.

The steps that an unmarried father must take in order to obtain rights to his child vary by country. In some countries (such as the UK – since 2003 in England and Wales, 2006 in Scotland, and 2002 in Northern Ireland) it is sufficient for the father to be listed on the birth certificate for him to have parental rights; in other countries, such as Ireland, simply being listed on the birth certificate does not offer any rights, additional legal steps must be taken (if the mother agrees, the parents can both sign a "statutory declaration", but if the mother does not agree, the father has to apply to court).

Children born outside marriage have become more common, and in some countries, the majority. Recent data from Latin America showed figures for non-marital childbearing to be 74% for Colombia, 69% for Peru, 68% for Chile, 66% for Brazil, 58% for Argentina, and 55% for Mexico. In 2012, in the European Union, 40% of births were outside marriage, and in the United States, in 2013, the figure was similar, at 41%. In the United Kingdom 48% of births were to unmarried women in 2012; in Ireland the figure was 35%.

During the first half of the 20th century, unmarried women in some Western countries were coerced by authorities to give their children up for adoption. This was especially the case in Australia, through the forced adoptions in Australia, with most of these adoptions taking place between the 1950s and the 1970s. In 2013, Julia Gillard, then Prime Minister of Australia, offered a national apology to those affected by the forced adoptions.

Some married couples choose not to have children. Others are unable to have children because of infertility or other factors preventing conception or the bearing of children. In some cultures, marriage imposes an obligation on women to bear children. In northern Ghana, for example, payment of bridewealth signifies a woman's requirement to bear children, and women using birth control face substantial threats of physical abuse and reprisals.

=== Sham marriage ===
Sham marriages are marriages to obtain advantages without a real marital relationship. These marriages had a diverse range of motives, including obtaining citizenship, obtaining permanent residency, securing an inheritance that has a marriage clause, or to enroll in health insurance, among many others. Marriages resulting in citizenship or permanent residency were found to have a higher divorce rate. Sham marriages can be punishable criminal offences.

== See also ==
- Black wedding
- Collective wedding
- Convention on Consent to Marriage, Minimum Age for Marriage and Registration of Marriages
- Inter-caste marriage
- Lavender marriage
- List of countries by marriage and divorce rates
- List of coupled cousins
- Marriage certificate
- Relationship science
- Transnational marriage
- White wedding
