= Outline of organizational theory =

Overview of concepts related to organizational theory

The following outline is provided as an overview of and topical guide to organizational theory:

Organizational theory – the interdisciplinary study of social organizations. Organizational theory also concerns understanding how groups of individuals behave, which may differ from the behavior of individuals. The theories of organizations include bureaucracy, rationalization (scientific management), and the division of labor.

Each theory provides distinct advantages and disadvantages when applied. The classical perspective emerges from the Industrial Revolution in the private sector and the need for improved public administration in the public sector.

== Forms ==
- Conglomerate
- Community organization
- Formal organization
  - Articles of organization
  - Corporate structure
  - Self-regulatory organization
- Functional organization
- Informal organization
  - Cooperative
  - Non-governmental organization
- International organization
  - Intellectual property organization
- Membership organization
  - Charitable organization
  - Consumer organization
- Multidimensional organization
- Organic organisation
- Pacifist organization
- Participatory organization
- Social network
  - Collaborative network
  - Social organization
    - Social enterprise
- Umbrella organization
  - Emergent organization
  - Joint venture
  - Sister organization

== Types ==
- Advocacy group
- Employers' organization
- Front organization
- Gang
- Hybrid organization
- Military organization
- Meta-organization
- Mutual organization
- Professional services network
- Trade association
- Virtual organization

== Concepts ==
- Co-determination
  - Group concept mapping
- Collective action
- Corporatism
- Decentralization
- Decoupling (organizational studies)
- Deliberation
- Fail fast
- Hawthorne effect
- Human resources
- Intention
- Institutional logic
- Just-in-time learning
- Learning organization
- Maturity model
- Metadesign
- Model of hierarchical complexity
- New Public Management
- Organizational patterns
- Participative decision-making in organizations
- Principal-agent problem
- Social system
  - Sociotechnical system
- Superior-subordinate communication
- Technology–organization–environment framework
- Voluntary redundancy

== I/O psychology ==
- Job characteristic theory
- Leader–member exchange theory
- Organisation climate
- Organizational identification
- Requisite organization
- Safety culture
- Trait activation theory

== Design ==
- Adhocracy
- Cellular organizational structure
- Departmentalization
- Flat organization
- Hierarchical organization
- Technostructure

== Development ==
- Organizational behavior
  - Organizational behavior management
- Organizational culture
- Organizational effectiveness
- Organizational engineering
- Organizational identity
  - Organizational digital identity
  - Organizational identification
- Organizational safety
- Organizational space

== Theories ==
- Actor network theory
- Critical theory
- Contingency theory
- Imprinting (organizational theory)
- Internalization theory
- Institutional theory
- Modernization theory
- Order theory
- Organizational information theory
- Resource dependence theory
- Social network theory
- Stakeholder theory
- Strategic Choice Theory
- Systems theory

== Themes ==
- Bureaucracy
- Collective intentionality
- Diversity, equity and inclusion
- Public administration
- Sociocracy

== Aspects ==
- Organizational analysis
  - Organizational network analysis
- Organizational assimilation
- Organizational chart
- Organizational ecology
- Organizational ethics
  - Organizational justice
  - Organizational technoethics
- Organizational performance
- Organisational semiotics

== Branches ==
- History of organizations
- Industrial organization
  - Organisation climate
- Organizational adaptation
- Organizational communication
  - Organizational storytelling
- Organizational economics
  - Organizational capital
  - Organizational life cycle
- Organizational learning
  - Organizational memory
  - Organizational metacognition
    - Ambidextrous organization

== People ==
- Chester Barnard
- Dwight Waldo
- Elton Mayo
- Frederick Winslow Taylor
- Herbert A. Simon
- Mary Parker Follett
- Max Weber
- Ulbo de Sitter

== Major works ==
- Cyert, Richard & March, James (1963). A Behavioral Theory of the Firm
- Simon, Herbert A. (1947). Administrative Behavior
- Weber, Max (1968). Economy and Society
- Waldo, Dwight (1948). The Administrative State
- Senge, Peter (1990). The Fifth Discipline
- Barnard, Chester (1938). The Functions of the Executive
- Lipset, Seymour Martin et al. (1956). Union Democracy

== Related lists ==
- Outline of academic disciplines
- Outline of industrial organization
- Outline of management
- Outline of sociology
