= David A. Whetten =

American organizational theorist (born 1946)

- Born: June 22, 1946 (age 80)
- Known for: organizational identity

Academic background
- Education: Brigham Young University; Cornell University
- Alma mater: UIUC; Brigham Young University
- Thesis: Predicting organization-set dimensions: an interorganizational study of the effectiveness of manpower programs in New York State (1974)
- Doctoral advisor: Howard E. Aldrich

David Allred Whetten (born June 22, 1946) is an American organizational theorist and Professor of Organizational Leadership and Strategy at the Marriott School of Management at the Brigham Young University. He is known for his work on organizational identity research methodology, and organizational effectiveness.

== Biography ==
Whetten obtained his BS in sociology in 1970 at Brigham Young University, where he in 1971 also obtained his MS in sociology. In 1974 he obtained his PhD in Organizational Behavior at Cornell University.

Whetten started his career as New York State Area Analyst at the National Planning Association in Washington, D.C., in 1971. After his graduation in 1974, he started his academic career at the University of Illinois as assistant professor in Business Administration. He became associate professor in Business Administration in 1980, and Professor in Business Administration from 1983 to 1994. From 1991 to 1991, he was also Commerce Alumni Professor of Business Administration, and from 1991 to 1994 Harry J. Gray Professor of Executive Leadership. Since 1994, he is Jack Wheatley Professor of Organizational Behavior at Brigham Young University.

From 1991 to 1994, Whetten was also Director of the Office of Organizational Research at the University of Illinois. After moving to the Brigham Young, he was Director of its Center for the Study of Values in Organizations until 1998, and Director of its Faculty Center since 1998.

Whetten was elected Academy of Management Fellow in 1991. The Academy of Management awarded him the Distinguished Service Award in 1994, and the Distinguished Scholar Award, Organization and Management Theory Division in 2002, and he served as its president.

== Selected publications ==
- Cameron, Kim S., and David A. Whetten, eds. Organizational effectiveness: A comparison of multiple models. Academic Press, 2013.
- David Alfred Whetten. Developing management skills

Articles, a selection:

- Aldrich, Howard, and David A. Whetten. "Organization-sets, action-sets, and networks: Making the most of simplicity." Handbook of organizational design 1 (1981): 385–408.
- Albert, Stuart, and David A. Whetten. "Organizational identity." Research in organizational behavior (1985).
- Whetten, David A. "What constitutes a theoretical contribution?." Academy of management review 14.4 (1989): 490–495.
- Whetten, David A., and Alison Mackey. "A social actor conception of organizational identity and its implications for the study of organizational reputation." Business & Society 41.4 (2002): 393–414.
- Brown, T. J., Dacin, P. A., Pratt, M. G., & Whetten, D. A. (2006). "Identity, intended image, construed image, and reputation: An interdisciplinary framework and suggested terminology." Journal of the Academy of Marketing Science, 34(2), 99–106.
