= Work Diva =

2009 book by Kim Meredith

Work Diva: How to Climb the Corporate Ladder Without Selling Your Soul
- Author: Kim Meredith
- Language: English
- Subject: Dealmaking
- Publisher: Oshun Books, Random House Struik
- Publication date: 2009
- Publication place: South Africa
- Pages: 192

Work Diva: How to Climb the Corporate Ladder Without Selling Your Soul is a book by Kim Meredith. The book explores the obstacles facing working women of today and deals with the realities of being a woman in the workplace. It illustrates how financial independence is vital in achieving self-actualisation and also explores stereotypes and attitudes, changing outlooks and the children-versus-career issue.

== Summary ==
The book examines the basics that women need, to empower themselves in the workplace. The author skims over the history of women’s oppression and delves into corporate issues, touching on negotiation skills, sexual harassment in the workplace and the value of mentoring.

Amongst some of the topics covered in the book are:

- Working hard and working smart
- Saying what one means and meaning what one says
- Keeping one's word
- Telling the truth, despite the consequences
- Taking responsibility for one’s actions
- The making of difficult decisions
- Treating others with respect

The book also lists eleven advantages of being a woman in business and touches on aspects such as feminine wiles, women’s intuition, perceptiveness, insight and flexibility, whilst offering guidelines to workplace romance.

== Criticism and reviews ==
Journalist Cindy Moritz said, "Work Diva is designed for women who aren't afraid to tone and shape their careers, whether they're at the start, in the middle or at the peak of their profession". According to Paballo Mosiane of Young Movers & Shakers magazine, the book aims to bring out the best in women so that they can make it in the male-dominated corporate world. Fia Minchener of JSE magazine described the book as tongue-in-cheek and humorous.
