= Charles A. Pierce =

Dean and Professor of Human Resource Management

- Born: 29 July 1968 (age 58)
- Occupations: Dean, Oakland University School of Business Administration

Academic background
- Education: Syracuse University (BS); University at Albany, SUNY (MA, PhD)

Academic work
- Discipline: Organizational psychology, Human resource management
- Institutions: Oakland University; University of Memphis; Montana State University

Charles A. Pierce (born 1968) is Dean and professor of Human Resource Management at Oakland University's School of Business Administration. His research focuses on workplace romance, sexual harassment in organizations, test bias and discrimination in employee selection, and organizational research methodology.

== Early life and education ==
Pierce earned a Bachelor of Science degree in psychology from Syracuse University in 1990. He completed his graduate studies at the University at Albany, State University of New York, receiving a Master of Arts in psychology in 1992 and a Ph.D. in psychology in 1995.

== Academic career ==
Pierce started his faculty career at Montana State University in 1995 as an assistant professor of industrial and organizational psychology, later becoming a tenured associate professor. During his tenure at Montana State, he served as coordinator of the Master of Science program in applied psychology (1996–2003) and Chair of the Department of Psychology in 2004. In 2004, Pierce joined the faculty at University of Memphis' Fogelman College of Business and Economics. He held several leadership roles, including coordinator of the Management Ph.D. program (2007–2011), Chair of the Department of Management (2011–2018), and Associate Dean for Academic Programs and Research (2017–2021). From July 2021 through July 2022, he served as Interim Dean of the Fogelman College of Business and Economics. During his tenure at Memphis, he held the Suzanne D. Palmer Research Professorship and the Great Oaks Foundation Professorship. In August 2022, Pierce was appointed Dean and Professor of Management at Oakland University's School of Business Administration. At Oakland, he supervised the AACSB accreditation renewal for the school's business and accounting programs and directed the expansion of degree offerings, including new STEM-designated graduate programs.

== Research and professional service ==
Pierce's research focuses on human resource management, organizational behavior, and quantitative organizational research methods. He has published on workplace romance, sexual harassment in organizations, meta-analytic methods, and the statistical detection of moderator variables in organizational contexts. Pierce served as Division Chair for the Research Methods Division of the Academy of Management and as Treasurer of the Southern Management Association. He was named a Specialty Chief Editor for Frontiers in Organizational Psychology and has served on the editorial boards of journals including Journal of Business and Psychology, Journal of Management, and Organizational Research Methods.

== Awards and honors ==
He was elected a Fellow of the Society for Industrial and Organizational Psychology and the Southern Management Association. Additionally, the Research Methods Division of the Academy of Management presented him with the Robert McDonald Advancement of Organizational Research Methodology Award twice, in 2009 and 2015. He was awarded the Journal of Organizational Behavior Best Paper Award in 1996.

== Selected publications ==
- Pierce, C. A., Byrne, D., & Aguinis, H. (1996). "Attraction in organizations: A model of workplace romance." Journal of Organizational Behavior, 17(1), 5–32. doi:10.1002/(SICI)1099-1379(199601)17:1<5::AID-JOB732>3.0.CO;2-9
- Pierce, C. A., Aguinis, H., & Adams, S. K. R. (2000). "Effects of a dissolved workplace romance and rater characteristics on responses to a sexual harassment accusation." Academy of Management Journal, 43(5), 869–880. doi:10.5465/1556417
- Pierce, C. A., & Aguinis, H. (2001). "A framework for investigating the link between workplace romance and sexual harassment." Group and Organization Management, 26(2), 206–229. doi:10.1177/1059601101262006
- Pierce, C. A., Block, R. A., & Aguinis, H. (2004). "Cautionary note on reporting eta-squared values from multifactor ANOVA designs." Educational and Psychological Measurement, 64(6), 916–924. doi:10.1177/0013164404264123
- Pierce, C. A., Broberg, B. J., McClure, J. R., & Aguinis, H. (2004). "Responding to sexual harassment complaints: Effects of a dissolved workplace romance on decision-making standards." Organizational Behavior and Human Decision Processes, 95(1), 66–82. doi:10.1016/j.obhdp.2003.06.001
- Aguinis, H., Beaty, J. C., Boik, R. J., & Pierce, C. A. (2005). "Effect size and power in assessing moderating effects of categorical variables using multiple regression: A 30-year review." Journal of Applied Psychology, 90(1), 94–107. doi:10.1037/0021-9010.90.1.94
- Aguinis, H., Sturman, M. C., & Pierce, C. A. (2008). "Comparison of three meta-analytic procedures for estimating moderating effects of categorical variables." Organizational Research Methods, 11(1), 9–34. doi:10.1177/1094428106292901
- Pierce, C. A., & Aguinis, H. (2009). "Moving beyond a legal-centric approach to managing workplace romances: Organizationally sensible recommendations for HR leaders." Human Resource Management, 48(3), 447–464. doi:10.1002/hrm.20289
- Hancock, J. I., Allen, D. G., Bosco, F. A., McDaniel, K. R., & Pierce, C. A. (2013). "Meta-analytic review of employee turnover as a predictor of firm performance." Journal of Management, 39(3), 573–603. doi:10.1177/0149206311424943
- Bosco, F. A., Aguinis, H., Singh, K., Field, J. G., & Pierce, C. A. (2015). "Correlational effect size benchmarks." Journal of Applied Psychology, 100(2), 431–449. doi:10.1037/a0038045
