= Ownership (psychology) =

Psychological feeling of possession

In psychology, ownership is the feeling that something is yours. Psychological ownership is distinct from legal ownership: for example, one may feel that one's cubicle at work is theirs and no one else's, even though legal ownership of the cubicle is actually conferred on the organization.

== Overview ==
People can feel ownership about a variety of things: products, workspaces, ideas, and roles. An example of ownership is the feeling that a product that you developed is yours and no one else's. For instance, the IKEA effect reveals that those who create a particular item value that item more than identical alternatives that they did not develop. At its core, ownership is about possession, stewardship, and the need to have control over something.

Since psychological ownership can be experienced for diverse targets such as concrete objects and abstract concepts (e.g., jobs, investments, brands, ideas), the construct of ownership as a psychological phenomenon has been researched within various fields. These fields include organizational behavior, consumer behavior, environmentalism, sustainability, and public health.

== Causes and mechanisms ==
Why does psychological ownership prevail?

The causes of psychological ownership are the following fundamental human motivations:

- Efficacy – Humans’ motivation to control their surroundings lead to efficacy, i.e., the ability to generate a preferred or intended outcome. They can control their environment by owning various possessions, which induces psychological ownership.
- Self-identity – The target of ownership tied to self-identity can be emblematic representations of the self. Their possessions aid people to establish their self-identity, both to themselves and to others.
- Belonging – People have a motivation to possess a “home”. In order to fulfill this desire, people spend significant resources for potential targets of ownership. These targets eventually get to be a part of ourselves.

How does psychological ownership emerge?

Psychological ownership emerges in three ways:

- Control – Having control over a target can result in psychological ownership due to enhanced feelings of self-determination and responsibility.
- Intimate knowledge – The more we know something, the more likely we are to feel it belongs to us. A sense of fusion with the target of ownership occurs after intimately knowing that target.
- Self-investment – By expending physical and mental energies, time, ideas, and skills in something, we begin to feel greater ownership.

== Consequences ==
=== Positive outcomes ===
Ownership can lead to several positive outcomes:

1. Citizenship behavior, discretionary effort, and personal sacrifice
2. Experienced responsibility and stewardship

=== Negative outcomes ===
Ownership can also lead to negative outcomes, especially when that sense of ownership is challenged (either legitimately, by a higher authority asserting their ownership of an entity, or illegitimately, by a subordinate or co-equal entity usurping one's own ownership):

1. Feelings of personal loss
2. Interpersonal conflict
3. Unwillingness to accept advice
4. Resistance to change

== Measuring psychological ownership ==
Since psychological ownership has been studied by multiple disciplines such as organizational behavior and consumer behavior, there are multiple scales in which the target of ownership is different (e.g., company, product). In organizational behavior, the following scale is used to measure psychological ownership:

1. This is MY organization.
2. I sense that this organization is OUR company.
3. I feel a very high degree of personal ownership for this organization.
4. I sense that this is MY company.

In consumer research, the following scale or scales adapted from it are used to measure psychological ownership of products that are the target of ownership:

1. I feel like this is MY (target).
2. I feel a very high degree of personal ownership for this (target).
3. I feel like I own this (target).

== Ownership in organizational settings ==
Ownership is distinctly related to psychological concepts such as organizational identification and organizational commitment. Organizational identification is the sense of belongingness to an organization and using the organization to define oneself. An example of organizational identification could be proudly stating for which organization you work in a casual conversation with a new acquaintance. Organizational commitment is defined as accepting the organization's goals, exerting effort, and a desire to maintain membership. An example of organizational commitment could be deciding to stay at an organization despite receiving an attractive job offer from another organization. Psychological ownership answers the question, ‘What is mine?’ Organizational identification answers the question, ‘Who am I?’ Organizational commitment answers the question, ‘Should I stay?’

Employee ownership is an effective managerial practice to strengthen commitment and emotional connection to the organization's vision and employee motivation at an individual level. Employee ownership can be generated through the following four factors:

- Independence – Offering instances in which the workers can have leadership and control over an aspect in the organization, e.g., self-managed projects, can produce psychological ownership.
- Shared information – Sharing information about the project, position, team, or organization that the employee is partaking in can increase psychological ownership. Therefore, workers gathering and knowing more information about certain aspects of the organization is essential.
- Investing self and contributing to the organization – Employees often invest their time, abilities, and ideas into their jobs. Increasing the sense of personal investment can be also possible through self-managed tasks.
- Accountability – Giving employees certain responsibilities that will evoke a sense of shared burden and authority can enhance psychological ownership.

== Ownership of physical objects ==
Ownership consists of the relationship between an individual and an object. This relationship can be very strong such that the individual considers their possessions as extensions of themselves. One may claim to own an object by (1) paying attention to it, (2) being in physical contact with it, (3) linking it with an experience or a memory, (4) labeling or marking it, hence, constructing a unique relationship, (5) legally owning. Furthermore, one might extend themselves to objects by creating both physical and digital collections such as books and music records.

== Ownership in personal finances ==
Ownership can exist in decisions that involve financial programs and services, such as the Social Security program and investments. The American Social Security Administration program was set up by President Franklin D. Roosevelt in 1935. The way it was structured was such that the workers’ contributions, exclusively, would fund it. It was a revolutionary idea at the time, since most social programs in other countries were funded by a composite of government and worker contributions. Even though the US social security system finances current retirees mainly through the contributions of the current employees, instead of what they individually contributed when they were working. These worker-only contributions were intended to install psychological ownership of benefits in workers, since each employee would be actively engaging in the program and have a sense of duty. The research has shown that their goals were met: people feel like the benefits they receive are coming from their own contributions.

Similarly, endowment effect supports that investment decisions such as home purchases and stock ownership instantly increase the appraisal of that particular item. This increase in valuation is, at least partially, caused by increased psychological ownership. This effect can be seen when investors prefer to stay with the status quo, i.e., their current particular investment assets more than other assets and when individuals do not want to swap their current inferior bank for a superior bank.

== See also ==
- Conversazione
- Endowment effect
- Prospect theory
- Ikea effect
- Consumer behavior
- Organizational behavior
- Organizational identification
- Organizational commitment
