= Manchester Journal =

Newspaper published in Vermont

- Type: Weekly newspaper
- Format: Broadsheet
- Owner(s): Vermont News and Media LLC
- Publisher: Jordan Brechenser
- Editor: Cherise Forbes
- Founded: May 28, 1861
- Headquarters: 3624 Main Street, Manchester, Vermont, United States
- Circulation: 7,088
- Website: www.manchesterjournal.com

The Manchester Journal is a weekly newspaper in Manchester, Vermont, United States. The paper, founded by Charles A. Pierce, published its first issue on May 28, 1861. According to the American Newspapers Representative database, the Manchester Journal has a weekly circulation of 7,088 and is distributed every Friday.

In 2012, the State of Vermont House of Representatives passed a Concurrent House Resolution (H.C.R. 39) congratulating the paper on its 150-year anniversary. The text of the resolution stated: "a reliable newspaper is an essential adjunct to facilitate the activities that transpire in a community such as Manchester, and whereas, since 1861, the Manchester Journal has ably fulfilled this role, chronicling the events of the day, promoting mercantile activity, and serving as a repository for legal notices…"

== Notable contributors and editors ==
One notable writer and editor for the Manchester Journal was Loveland Munson (1843–1921), who was an associate and later chief judge on the Vermont Supreme Court [source]. Munson served as a member of the Constitutional Convention of 1870. He edited the Journal from 1863 to 1866.

Another writer for the Manchester Journal was Walter Rice Hard Sr., a native of Manchester, Vermont, who ran the Johnny Appleseed Book Shop in Manchester. Hard wrote a regular column of unrhymed prose for the paper starting in 1924, in it sketching the nuances of Vermont people and life. Hard, who also authored nine books of poetry and two books of essays, wrote prose that described Vermont life in a unique way, earning him the admiration of more well-known writers such as Robert Frost and Carl Sandburg.

== Management and ownership ==
The Manchester Journal was founded by Charles A. Pierce, a publisher from Battleboro, Vermont. Pierce hired D. K. Simonds to be on the paper's staff in 1871. Simonds purchased the paper later in 1871, remaining owner and editor until 1905, when he sold it to Otto Bennett. The Bennett family owned the Journal until 1968, when it was sold to Jim and Gayle Gall. In 1983, it was acquired by the Kelton B. Miller family, who also owned the Bennington Banner, the Brattleboro Reformer, and the Berkshire Eagle, which was their largest circulation paper.

In 1995, the four papers were acquired by MediaNews Group, which became Digital First Media after the 2008 market crash. Under Digital First Media, all four papers saw significant staff reductions and, in 2015, they were once again offered for sale. This time, a group of local business people from Pittsfield, Massachusetts, who wanted to reclaim the Berkshire Eagle as a local paper, purchased the papers’ parent company, known as New England Newspapers, Inc. In May 2021, the New England Newspapers sold Manchester Journal, Brattleboro Reformer and Bennington to Vermont News and Media LLC

In 2016, Greg Sukiennik was named editor of the Manchester Journal. Cherise Madigan was named editor of the Manchester Journal in January 2018. In October 2018, 22-year veteran journalist Darren Marcy was named the Journal's editor. Cherise Forbes was named managing editor in 2024.
