= Organizational architecture (disambiguation) =

Organizational architecture may refer to:

- Interdisciplinary Center for Organizational Architecture, a research center in Denmark
- Organization design, sometimes referred to as organizational architecture, the creation of roles, processes, and formal reporting relationships in an organization
- Organization development, the study and implementation of practices, systems, and techniques that affect organizational change
- Organizational space, sometimes referred to as organizational architecture, the influence of the spatial environment on humans in and around organizations.
- Organizational structure, a definition of how activities such as task allocation, coordination, and supervision are directed toward the achievement of organizational aims

== See also ==
- Architecture (disambiguation)
- Departmentalization
- Enterprise architecture
- Enterprise architecture framework
