= Social environment =

Setting in which people live and interact

The social environment, social context, sociocultural context or milieu is the immediate physical and social setting in which people live or in which something happens or develops. It includes the culture that the individual was educated or lives in, and the people and institutions with whom they interact. The interaction may be in person or through communication media, even anonymous or one-way, and may not imply equality of social status. The social environment is a broader concept than that of social class or social circle.

The physical and social environment is a determining factor in active and healthy aging in place, being a central factor in the study of environmental gerontology.

Moreover, the social environment is the setting where people live and interact. It includes the buildings and roads around them, the jobs available, and how money flows; relationships between people, such as power dynamics and intergroup relations; and culture, such as art, religion, and traditions. It includes the physical world and the way people relate to each other and their communities.

== Components ==
=== Physical environment ===
The physical environment is the ever-changing natural world, including weather, land, and natural resources. Floods or earthquakes can alter the landscape, affecting how plants and animals live. Human interaction with nature can also have an impact. For example, logging can change the weather in that area, pollution can make water dirty, and habitat fragmentation caused by human activity makes it so animals cannot move around as easily, which can cause problems for their families.

In order to enrich their lives, people have used natural resources, and in the process have brought about many changes in the natural environment; human settlements, roads, farmlands, dams, and many other elements have all developed through the process. All these man-made components are included in human cultural environment.

=== Cultural and societal influence ===
"Sociocultural" denotes the amalgamation of society and culture, which affects how people think, feel, and act, and which can also affect our health. It includes the impact of wealth, education, career, cultural background, race, ethnicity, language, and beliefs on people's identity and health.

=== Social and interpersonal relationships ===
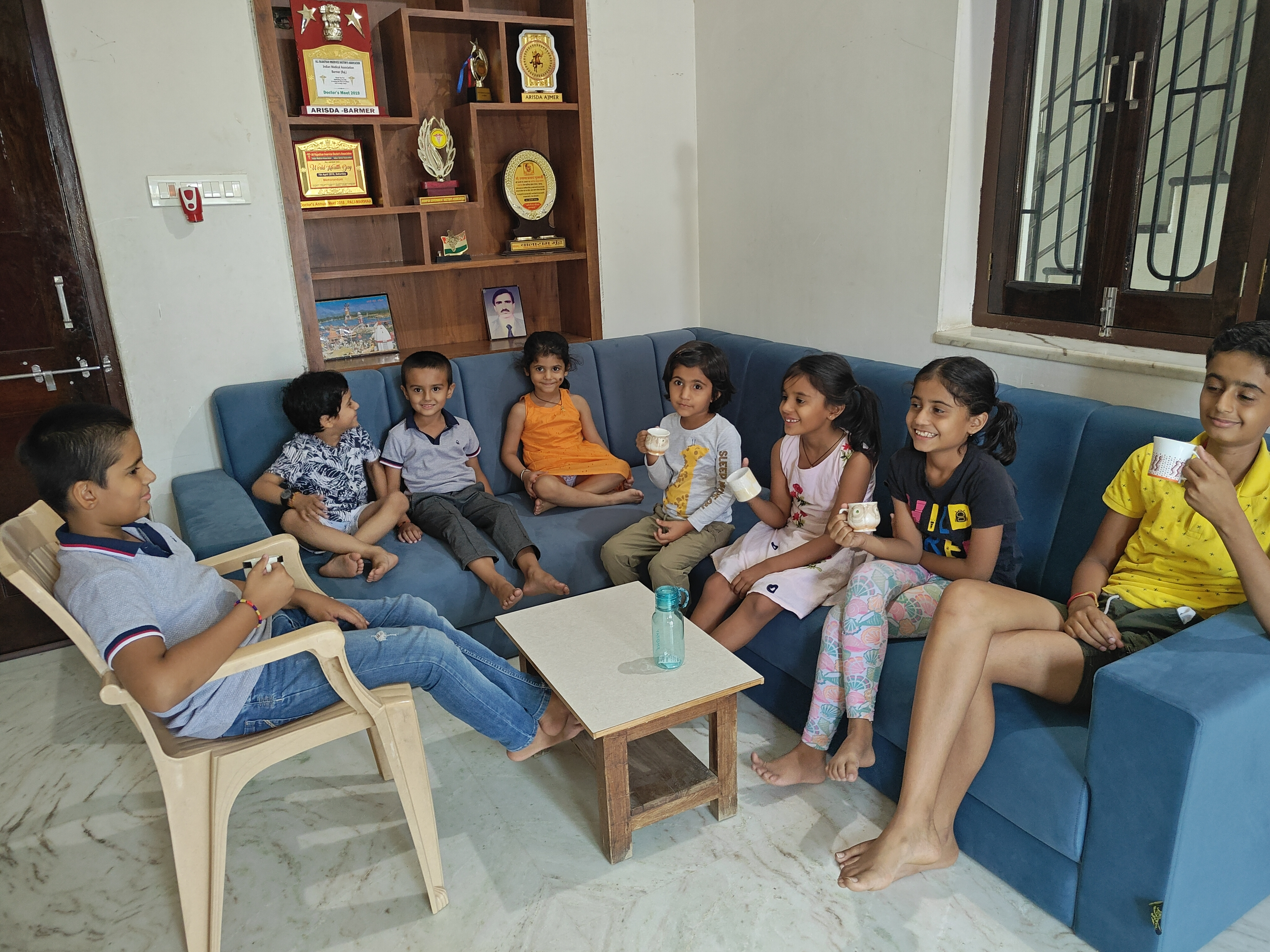
Social interactions can have a positive effect on well-being.

Social relations are the connections individuals form with others—such as family, friends, neighbors, and coworkers—that influence emotional well-being and behavior. Sociologist Emile Durkheim thought that if these interactions were disrupted, it could affect how we feel. Social relations can offer emotional or practical support, such as comforting someone when they are sad or helping with chores.

Interpersonal relationships—emotional and social connections between individuals—can be impacted by mental disorders. For example, some mental disorders may give rise to conflicts with others. These conflicts can appear in different areas of relationships.

When scientists study how relationships affect human health and behavior, they usually focus on these close relationships, rather than on formal ones like with healthcare providers or lawyers. They are interested in how people interact with their social circle and how it impacts them overall.

==== Family relationships ====
Family relationships hold significance with regard to an individual's well-being across the lifespan. Supportive family ties provide emotional comfort, practical assistance, and a sense of belonging, all of which contribute to better mental and physical health. Research indicates that individuals with strong family connections experience higher life satisfaction and improved overall health outcomes. Moreover, perceived family support has been shown to enhance emotional and psychological well-being by fostering positive emotions and social interactions.

==== Work relationship ====
Workplace relationships are unique interpersonal relationships with important implications for the individuals in those relationships, and the organizations in which the relationships exist and develop. Workplace relationships directly affect a worker's ability and drive to succeed. These connections are multifaceted, can exist in and out of the organization, and can be both positive and negative. One such detriment lies in the nonexistence of workplace relationships, which can lead to feelings of loneliness and social isolation. Workplace relationships are not limited to friendships, but also include superior-subordinate, romantic, and family relationships.

==== Sexual and intimate relationships ====
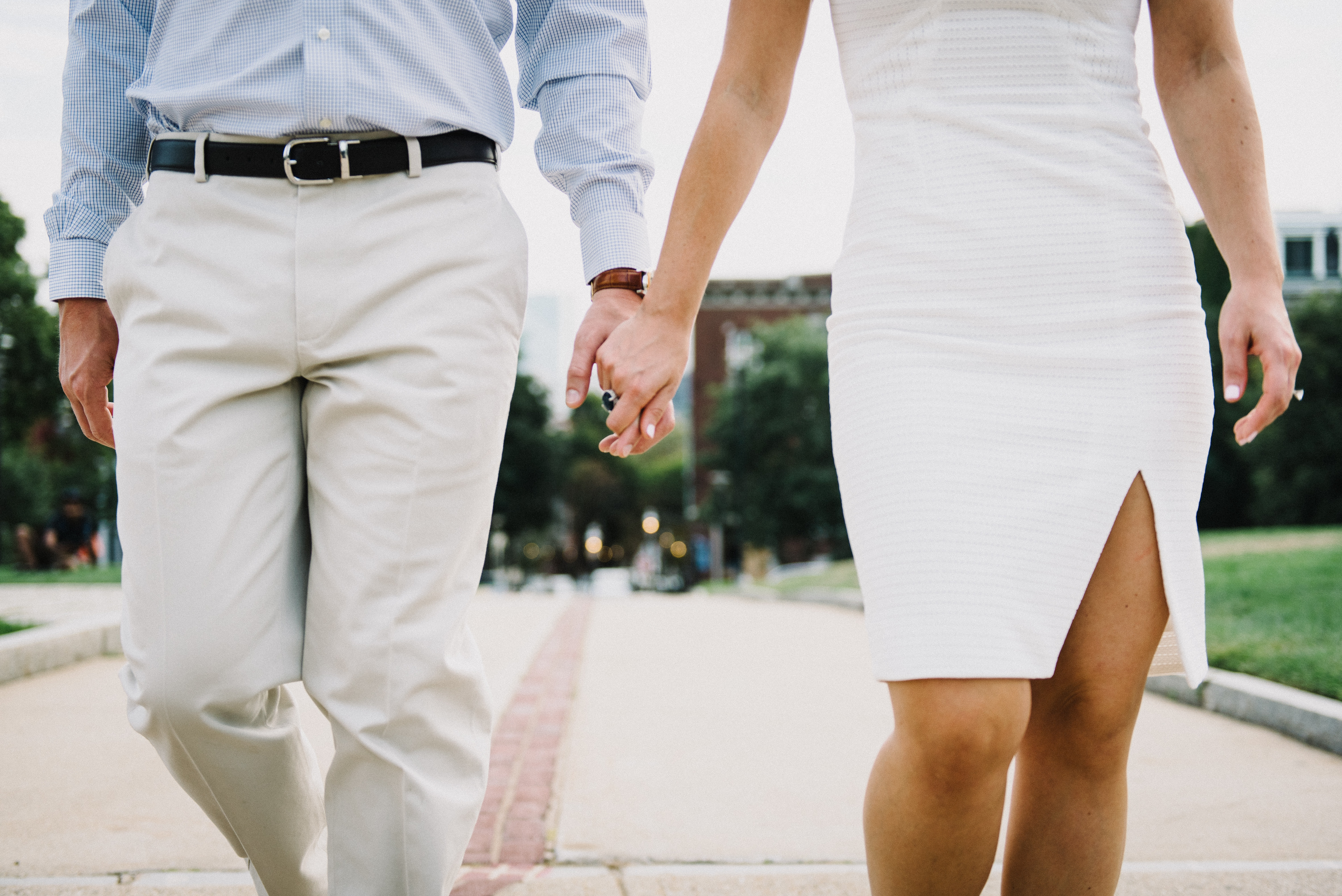
Holding hands is a form of intimacy

An intimate relationship is an interpersonal relationship that involves emotional or physical closeness between people and may include sexual intimacy and feelings of romance or love. Intimate relationships are interdependent, and the members of the relationship mutually influence each other. The quality and nature of the relationship depends on the interactions between individuals, and is derived from the unique context and history that builds between people over time. Social and legal institutions such as marriage acknowledge and uphold intimate relationships between people. However, intimate relationships are not necessarily monogamous or sexual, and there is wide social and cultural variability in the norms and practices of intimacy between people.

In intimate relationships that are sexual, sexual satisfaction is closely tied to overall relationship satisfaction. Sex promotes intimacy, increases happiness, provides pleasure, and reduces stress. Studies show that couples who have sex at least once per week report greater well-being than those who have sex less than once per week. Research in human sexuality finds that the ingredients of high quality sex include feeling connected to your partner, good communication, vulnerability, and feeling present in the moment. High quality sex in intimate relationships can both strengthen the relationship and improve well-being for each individual involved.

== Impacts ==
=== Childhood ===
Where a child grows up and goes to school has a significant impact on whom they befriend and on the quality of the resulting friendships. Most of the time, children befriend others within their family or neighborhood. Thus, where parents choose to live, work, and send their kids to school can affect the health and happiness of their children.

=== Solidarity ===
People with the same social environment often develop a sense of social solidarity; people often tend to trust and help one another, and to congregate in social groups. They often think in similar styles and patterns, even though the conclusions which they reach may differ.

== Milieu/social structure ==
C. Wright Mills contrasted the immediate milieu of jobs/family/neighborhood with the wider formations of the social structure, highlighting in particular a distinction between "the personal troubles of milieu" and the "public crises of social structure".

Emile Durkheim took a wider view of the social environment (milieu social), arguing that it contained internalized expectations and representations of social forces/social facts: "Our whole social environment seems to be filled with forces which really exist only in our own minds" – collective representations.

== Phenomenology ==
Phenomenologists contrast two alternative visions of society, as a deterministic constraint (milieu) and as a nurturing shell (ambiance).

Max Scheler distinguishes between milieu as an experienced value-world, and the objective social environment on which we draw to create the former, noting that the social environment can either foster or restrain our creation of a personal milieu.

== Social surgery ==
Pierre Janet saw neurosis in part as the product of the identified patient's social environment – family, social network, work etc. – and considered that in some instances what he termed "social surgery" to create a healthier environment could be a beneficial measure.

Similar ideas have since been taken up in community psychiatry and family therapy.

== See also ==
- Alfred Schütz – The four divisions of the lifeworld
- Communitarianism – Philosophy emphasizing community
- Community of practice
- Family nexus – Viewpoint held and reinforced by the majority of family members
- Framing (social sciences) – Effect of how information is presented on perception
- Generalized other – Social science concept
- Habitus (sociology) – How individuals perceive and react to the social world
- Microculture – Systems of cultural knowledge unique to subgroups
- Milieu control – Sociological tactic
- Milieu therapy – Form of psychotherapy that involves the use of therapeutic communities
- Pillarisation – Division of civil society along religio-political lines
