= Peter Burke =

Peter Burke may refer to:

- Peter Burke (barrister) (1811–1881), English serjeant-at-law
- Peter Burke (Gaelic footballer) (born 1976), played for Mayo
- Peter Burke (historian) (born 1937), British historian and professor
- Peter Burke (Irish footballer), Irish association footballer
- Peter Burke (footballer, born 1912) (1912–1979), English association footballer for Norwich City, Oldham Athletic and Southport
- Peter Burke (footballer, born 1957), English association footballer
- Peter Burke (politician) (born 1982), Fine Gael TD for Longford–Westmeath
- Peter Burke (rugby union) (1927–2017), New Zealand rugby union player and coach
- Peter Burke (rugby league) (born 1933), Australian rugby league player
- Peter Burke, a White Collar character
- Peter Burke (Australian footballer) (born 1964), Australian rules footballer
- Peter J. Burke, American sociologist and social psychologist
- Peter Burke (soccer), Australian association footballer
