= Workplace relationship =

Relationships between workers centered on a workplace

Workplace relationships are unique interpersonal relationships with important implications for the individuals in those relationships, and the organizations in which the relationships exist and develop.

Workplace relationships directly affect a worker's ability and drive to succeed. These connections are multifaceted, can exist in and out of the organization, and can be both positive and negative. One such detriment lies in the nonexistence of workplace relationships, which can lead to feelings of loneliness and social isolation. Workplace relationships are not limited to friendships, but also include superior-subordinate, romantic, and family relationships.

== Workplace friendships ==
Friendship is a relationship between two individuals that is entered into voluntarily, develops over time, and has shared social and emotional goals. These goals may include feelings of belonging, affection, and intimacy.

Due to the great deal of time co-workers spend together, friendships start to emerge through their shared experiences, and their desire for a built-in support system.

Blended friendships are friendships that develop in the workplace and can have a positive impact on an employee's productivity. Workplace friendships lead to more cohesive work groups, more satisfied and committed employees, greater productivity, greater goal attainment, and increased positive feelings about the organization; they can make enjoyable or unenjoyable tasks more pleasant and are a factor in preventing employee turnover. Workplace friendships tend to have a positive impact on employees' overall productivity and attitude towards their job. However, they can also be detrimental to productivity because of the inherent competition, envy, gossip, and distraction from work-related activities that accompany close friendships.

Another form of workplace friendship is the multiplex friendship. These friendships involve having friendships both inside and outside of the workplace. One benefit of multiplex relationships is that each party receives support in and out of the workplace. These friendships also make the involved parties feel secure and involved in their environment. Studies show that having larger multiplex relational networks within the workplace results in more positive feelings associated with their workplace. These feelings of involvement and belonging lead to effects such as increased productivity and a reduction in exhaustion.

Having friendships in the workplace can not only improve efficiency, but can also encourage creativity and decision-making within the organization. This will increase job satisfaction and commitment to the organization. It can be difficult to maintain friendships in the workplace. When an individual thinks his or her friendship with another co-worker is becoming too serious, that individual may start to avoid the other person. This would make it harder for the individual to maintain their friendship, which may cause tension in the environment. If an individual feels that a co-worker is pulling away from the friendship, that individual may use openness to attempt to maintain that friendship by confronting the other person and discussing why the relationship is deteriorating. Openness is a great tactic in some situations, but not in all. Parties using contradicting communication styles, pre-existing hostile work environments, and significant status differences are situations in which openness would not be an effective relational maintenance tactic.

In the workplace, individuals cannot choose their co-workers. They can, however, choose who they want to have a professional relationship with and who they want to form a friendship with outside of work. These friendships are distinguished from regular workplace relationships as they extend past the roles and duties of the workplace. Workplace friendships are influenced by individual and contextual factors such as life events, organizational socialization, shared tasks, physical proximity, and work problems.

Workplace loneliness can be caused by a lack of workplace friendships, competition, or a lack of cooperation at work. Workplace loneliness can negatively affect an organization as it is often linked to low affiliation and organizational identification. It can also significantly affect one's mental health, as employees may feel unsupported by peers and superiors in managing daily work-related stress. Lonely workers tend to become overly self-conscious and they may begin view their co-workers as untrustworthy members of the organization. This then hinders them from forming and maintaining important relationships as work, such as friendships or camaraderie.

== Superior-subordinate relationships ==
The Hawthorne effect grew out of a series of studies. The theory states that an individual will act differently than they normally would due to the individual's awareness of being watched. Specifically in McGregor's X- and Y-Theory, it states that the manager's approach has effects on the outcome of the worker. Individuals who receive attention from their superior will have positive feelings of receiving special treatment. Specifically, they feel that the attention they are receiving is unique from the attention that other employees are receiving. The basic understanding of superior-subordinate relationships lies in the foundation that the habits of a superior tend to have the power to create productive or counterproductive environments.

Kohn and O'Connell point out 6 major habits of highly effective bosses. One of the habits is known as following the ‘Golden Rule.' This habit is fundamental in many relationships. It states that you should treat others as you wish to be treated. If workers know that their superiors are treating them with the same respect and dignity in which they are treating their superior, they will then feel more positive and inviting feelings in regard to their relationship.

Other theories that explain the superior-subordinate relationships are workplace relationship quality, employee information experiences theory, and the leader-membership theory. The leader-membership theory is widely accepted regarding superior-subordinate relationships. Its main premise includes the idea that employees with the easiest access to information are the most likely to succeed. Furthermore, employees with a higher quality relationship with their supervisor have more access to such information and will be more likely to succeed in the workplace; thus feeling an increased sense of pride and affiliation within their workplace.

Mentorship relationships in the workplace are another important dynamic, where a more experienced employee (mentor) provides guidance and support to a less experienced employee (mentee). These relationships can foster career growth, personal development, and organizational loyalty. Successful mentorships benefit both parties, as mentors often gain fulfillment from shaping future leaders, while mentees receive valuable advice and networking opportunities. Organizations that encourage formal or informal mentorship programs often report higher employee engagement and job satisfaction.

== Romantic ==
Romantic workplace relationships are intimate connections between coworkers. These relationships may be romantic, sexual, or combination partnerships with both emotional and physical elements. A similar concept that may involve less actual romance is work spouse.

Romantic partnerships involve a strong emotional attachment and close connection between partners without sexual relations. Sexual partnerships are a partnership with a lack of an intimate connection, and instead include a strictly physical and sexual relationship. An example behavior of employees in a sexual relationship is online sexual activity (OSA) because of opportunity. That chance may satisfy sexual distress, boredom, or many other reasons. Combination partnerships are a combination of both sexual and romantic relations between both of the individuals.

Romantic workplace relationships play a complicated role not only for those involved in the relationship, but also for the employees working with these individuals. Romantic workplace relationships have been known to create polarization in the workplace, employee distraction, and feelings of awkwardness among other employees.

Employees (particular women) who date superiors often lose trust from coworkers because of the possibility of unfair advantages they might receive. Those involved, however, have had positive results in the workplace, such as increased performance, higher motivation, and higher overall job satisfaction.

Romantic relationships in the office can cause problems and employees may face consequences. A love contract, also known as Consensual Relationship Agreements, are used to maintain a functional work place. Love contracts are important mainly in the event that a couple decides to terminate their relationship. If the relationship were to end badly, the love contract forbids the couple to file charges, such as sexual assault, against one another and/or the company.

== Family ==
Small and large family businesses are unique to the organizational world based on their patterns of governance, succession, management, and ownership by influencing their business's goals, structures, strategies, and the approach owners take in the process of designing and implementing.

Succession is known to be an important issue families will face within a business setting. Family business succession is known as the passing of the business on from the current owner to a successor whether that be within the family or not. The responsibility of providing succession lies with the owner or founder of the business. The succession process can be divided into four common stages, which include the stage of owner-management in which only one member of the family is involved in the business, a training and development stage in which the owner's children learn the business, a partnership stage between a parent and child, and a power transfer stage in which responsibilities shift to the successor.

Family businesses have many strategic advantages. These advantages include the sharing of family language, values, and background. These advantages tend to filter into the respect they have towards one another and the sacrifice of individual task for the well-being of the business.

Conflicts can arise due to the lack of, or the absence of, common goals for the business. A frequent issue that family businesses face is whether or not the separation of business and family roles are clear. Another issue may include making difficult decisions when it comes to what is best for the business and what is best for the family. Well over half of all family business end up failing before the second successor takes ownership and almost 90% will fail before the third successor takes ownership.

== Responses to workplace relationships ==
Responses that can be resulted from workplace relationships involve job productivity, worker morale, worker motivation, job satisfaction, job involvement, and gossip. In addition to these, managers can make decisions such as promotions, relocations, and terminations.

Features of friendships include voluntary interaction, informality, communal norms, and socio-emotional goals.

Features of organizations include involuntary interactions, formality, exchange norms, and instrumental goals.

These features clash with each other when a workplace relationship is occurring.

On an individual level, distractions and inter-role conflicts occur while an attempt to balance both features of friendship and the organization need to be satisfied.

On a group and organizational level, workplace relationships can cause exclusivity, social status hierarchy, and a decrease in diverse thinking (groupthink).

Results of workplace relationships can both benefit and hinder the employees and organization. There are no rules to predict what will occur because of it.

According to one article, it highlights the importance of affective events and incidental moods in driving job satisfaction, in addition to cognitive-based drivers.
