= Peter J. Burke =

Social psychologist and sociologist

- Known for: Identity theory, identity control theory

Academic background
- Education: Yale University

Academic work
- Discipline: Sociology, social psychology

Peter J. Burke is an American sociologist and social psychologist. He is an expert on identity theory and has developed a theory of identity control. Burke is a Distinguished professor at University of California, Riverside.

He is a fellow member of the American Association for the Advancement of Science and the Association for Psychological Science and the 2003 winner of the Cooley-Mead Award from the American Sociological Association for lifetime contributions to social psychology.

== Biography ==
=== Education ===
Burke completed a master's and Ph.D. degree in sociology from the University of Yale in 1965.

=== Teaching and professional experience ===
Burke became Assistant Professor of Sociology at Indiana University in 1965, Associate Professor in 1969, and Professor in 1975. He served as Professor at Indiana University until 1988, at Washington State University until 2002 and at University of California, Riverside until 2010. He is since 2010 a Distinguished Emeritus Professor at Riverside.

== Selected publications ==
- Burke, Peter J.; Stets, Jan E. (November 22, 2022). Identity Theory: Revised and Expanded. Oxford University Press. ISBN 978-0-19-761721-2.
- Stets, Jan E.; Burke, Peter J. (2000). "Identity Theory and Social Identity Theory". Social Psychology Quarterly. 63 (3): 224–237. doi:10.2307/2695870. ISSN 0190-2725. JSTOR 2695870.
- Stryker, Sheldon; Burke, Peter J. (2000). "The Past, Present, and Future of an Identity Theory". Social Psychology Quarterly. 63 (4): 284–297. doi:10.2307/2695840. ISSN 0190-2725. JSTOR 2695840. S2CID 5849744.
- Burke, Peter J. (1991). "Identity Processes and Social Stress". American Sociological Review. 56 (6): 836–849. doi:10.2307/2096259. ISSN 0003-1224. JSTOR 2096259.
- Burke, Peter J.; Reitzes, Donald C. (1981). "The Link Between Identity and Role Performance". Social Psychology Quarterly. 44 (2): 83–92. doi:10.2307/3033704. ISSN 0190-2725. JSTOR 3033704.

== See also ==
- Identity control theory
- Identity (social science)
