= Le Conversazioni =

Literary festival

Le Conversazioni is an anglophone literary festival organized by Italian film personalities Antonio Monda and Davide Azzolini, and financed by the Italian government and various corporations. It is held on the island of Capri. The festival was first held in 2006. These gatherings have attracted a wide range of notable writers, including Martin Amis, Paul Auster, Chuck Palahniuk, Elizabeth Strout, Colum McCann, Donna Tartt, Nathan Englander, Nicole Krauss, EL Doctorow, Jeffrey Eugenides, Ian McEwan, Claire Messud, Annie Proulx, Stephen Sondheim, Michael Chabon, Wole Soyinka, Jamaica Kincaid, Jonathan Safran Foer, David Sedaris, Ian McEwan, Zadie Smith, Philip Gourevitch, David Foster Wallace, and others.

In 2009 Le Conversazioni became a global festival with events at the Morgan Library in New York. Amongst the guests have been: Renzo Piano, Marina Abramović, Jonathan Franzen, Ian Buruma, Paul Schrader, Daniel Mendelsohn, AM Homes, Mark DiSuvero, Daniel Libeskind, Gay Talese, Michael Cunningham.

== See also ==
- Conversazione
