= Organizational assimilation =

Organizational assimilation is a process in which new members of an organization integrate into the organizational culture.

This concept, proposed by Fredric M. Jablin, consists of two dynamic processes that involve the organizational attempts to socialize the new members, as well as the current organization members. Organizational Socialization or Onboarding are both parts of the assimilation process. There are three phases in the assimilation process: Anticipatory Socialization, Organizational Encounter, and Metamorphosis.

== Anticipatory socialization ==
Anticipatory socialization is the first of the three phases in the assimilation process. In this stage newcomers form expectations of the organization and what it would be like to become a member of that particular organization. During this stage most newcomers develop a set of expectations and beliefs about how people communicate formally and informally in a particular organization.

There are two forms of anticipatory socialization that are interrelated.

1. Vocational anticipatory socialization: learning about the world of work and about vocations. The general information you have collected intentionally and unintentionally about the occupation/organization as you mature from childhood to a young adult. This can be done through various sources such as family, friends, media, education and part-time employment. Each of these sources represent a microsystem in maturing a person's career development. These systems are interconnected with one another and are also part of a larger system. For example: the information you gather from your childhood and growing up about what it would be like to be a teacher and work in a school.

2. Organizational anticipatory socialization: Information seeking prior to joining an organization. The information you intentionally and unintentionally gather when you are searching for a job. In the process of seeking jobs, newcomers will develop expectations about the organization they have applied for employment. This information comes from organizational literature such as job postings, annual reports, company brochures, and websites as well as interpersonal interactions such as job interviews, company visits and interpersonal interactions with current employees, organizational interviews, teachers, other applicants and through indirect social networking ties. This process begins to socialize job seekers even before they become part of the organization.

== Organizational encounter ==
This stage of organizational assimilation involves the organizational member entering and becoming acquainted with the new organization, and occurs when "the newcomer confronts the reality of his or her organizational role." The new member, while already formally admitted within the organization, has not become socially accepted as a trustworthy or dependable member in the eyes of their coworkers. Organizational encounter mainly consists of the newly admitted employee seeking and receiving information in order to become more familiar with the processes regarding the organization.

Generally, there are five primary tactics practiced by new members experiencing the encountering process in order to obtain information that will help in the assimilation process, and are listed below in order of frequency of use.

Information-seeking tactics

- Observation consists of watching other employee's actions and modeling their behaviors
- Overt questioning involves asking for information in a direct manner
- Third-party questioning deals with asking an employee that is not considered a primary information source (perhaps outside organization)
- Indirect seeking combines the practices of indirect questioning and the disguising of conversations. These tactics are used to discreetly obtain information through the use of jokes, hints, and self-disclosure, in order to avoid being obvious
- Testing involves the breaking of rules and monitoring response

The context, level of uncertainty, type of information being sought, and source of information, all play a major role in which information seeking tactic is to be used by the new organizational member. It is important for employees within this stage to be aware of these tactics in order to effectively assimilate within an organization.

== Metamorphosis ==
Metamorphosis is the final stage of the assimilation process. “This transition is best understood as the psychological adjustment that occurs when uncertainty has been managed and an individuals priorities move from being preoccupied with their transition to maintaining their new situations (Schlossberg, 1981).” In the beginning of the metamorphosis stage the employee begins to alter his or her priorities so that they are in line with the values of the organization. Through this, the employee transitions from new member to an insider, occurring when the new member is asked for their opinions, included in making decisions and given responsibilities. The employee can negotiate some aspects of their role at the organization, but for the most part they have to adapt to the standards already in place. The employee comes to know and appreciate the values and skills expected of them. This appreciation of the values, the integration of the employee in the organization, as well as the acceptance by higher up members enhances positive feelings towards the organization.

== Extensions of assimilation theory ==
Myers and Oetzel (2003) extended organizational assimilation theory by creating a measure to assess organizational members' level of assimilation. The organizational assimilation index (OAI) contains six dimensions by which organizational assimilation is measured:

1. Familiarity with others is the first step of fitting into the organization. New members' affect toward their supervisory begins to develop.
2. Acculturalization refers to new members' acceptance and shared understanding of the organization's culture.
3. Recognition is the perception that one's value to the organization is recognized by superiors. Job satisfaction, commitment, and organizational identification increases as recognition increases.
4. Involvement volunteering for additional organizational duties and accomplishing work more efficiently. The earlier a new member becomes involved with the organization, the higher the feelings of acceptance and levels of productivity.
5. Job Competency refers to the beliefs that one can adequately perform their job duties.
6. Adaptation and Role Negotiation involves the interaction of newcomers with existing members of the organization and degree to which one attempts to compromise on ways a role should be enacted.

The OAI can provide data to organizations about the success or shortcomings of new member developmental programs. Additionally, the OAI helps organizations to understand and recognize determinants of premature turnover, such as the lack of effective communication processes at the organizational and interpersonal levels. It should be cautioned that OAI should not be used as a mechanism to identify and eliminate employees who may be deviants.

== Organizational exit ==
Organizational exit is the voluntary separation from the organization in the context of assimilation theory. There are several communication typologies that serve as an antecedent of turnover and determine the member's affective response to assimilation.

Communication as Antecedent of Turnover

- Organization-wide communication - organizational commitment and identification increase if effective
- Structuring characteristics - framework of work rules and procedures
- Network integration - involvement in networks may increase commitment
- Supervisory communication - satisfaction with superior-subordinate relationship is a determinant of employee turnover
- Coworker communication - group relationships may impact organizational commitment and propensity to leave
- Communication expectations - when an individual's expectations are not substantially met, likelihood to withdraw increases
- Role ambiguity and conflict - high levels reduce commitment
- Communication traits and competencies - self-perception, locus of control, self-monitoring, cognitive complexity, apprehension

Communication Correlates of Withdrawal

- Avoidance of communication with others
- Emphasis on differences or distinctions between self and others/organization
- Emphasis on welfare of stayers, work load transition, passing of information

The impact to the organizational communication after employee turnover exits at all levels. Stayers must redevelop network ties or links to others. Work groups may experience a gap, or, they may experience increased cohesion if the separated employee was an isolate. Supervisors must replace the employee and overcome communication gaps within the organization. Additionally, the separated employee must decide whether to continue their relationships with stayers or sever ties.

== Criticisms of the assimilation theory ==
The use of the word assimilation has been criticized for not explaining the process it denotes. The word assimilation in everyday language means "denote absorption into the whole," which does not represent the dual agency notion. This process has also been criticized for ignoring individual experiences. Bullis and Stout (2000) claimed that these stages are the common experience in American society and those who do not fit into this process are irrelevant.

Early models depict assimilation occurring in three discreet linear stages, which may not be the case.

In 2010, the OAI was reexamined to include a seventh factor used to detect group differences between men, women, managers, non, and members between short and lengthy tenures. Myers and Oetzel's original OAI was conceptualized as a multidimensional measure to better assess the multiple processes that operate concurrently and mutually influence each other. Although, a members' tenure, position and sex are thought to influence these processes and warrant further study.

A primary limitation of Organizational Assimilation Theory is the lack of research that takes a deeper look into how diverse, marginalized, or individuals holding lower-ranked positions experience the multidimensional process of assimilation.

Allen (2000, 2007) and Cox (1993) similarly observe that many universalizing processes inherently privilege the experiences and positions of White men, without accounting for issues of race and gender. Without broader studies of the experiences of persons of color and women, assimilation research can contribute to an institutional bias that marginalizes the voices and experiences of traditionally underrepresented groups (Allen, 2004; Buzzanell, 1994; Cox, 1993).
