= Conversazione =

Learned or art society's social gathering for conversation and discussion

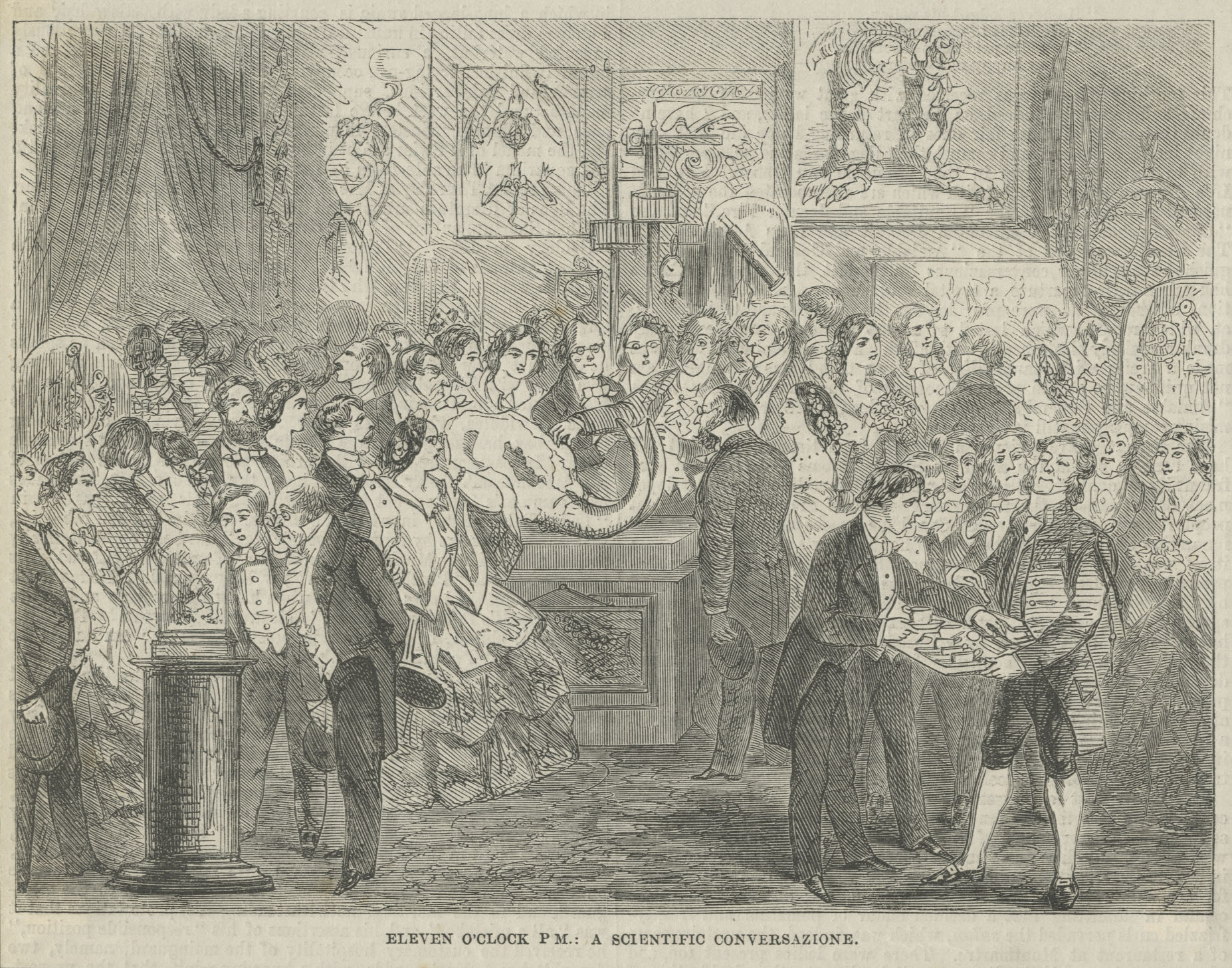
A scientific Conversazione (1858).

A conversazione (kon-ver-saht-see-OH-nay) is a "social gathering [predominantly] held by [a] learned or art society" for conversation and discussion, especially about the arts, literature, medicine, and science.

It would not be easy to devise a happier way [than the conversazione] of bringing novelties at once under practical criticism—of making the outliers of science acquainted with the centre, of enabling investigators to compare operations and discuss facts and speculations, and of giving occasion for renewal of intercourse and removal of misunderstandings. …
[The] tangible gain to science [from the conversazione is that] inventors and experimentalists … hear [directly] what contemporaries say of their schemes and experiments, and much can be said and done with advantage amid the free talk of a general gathering which could not be permitted in the formal meeting of a scientific society. (Nature, 5 May 1870.)

== Origin ==
The writer Horace Walpole is credited with the first recorded English use of conversazione in a letter written (from Italy) on 11 November 1739 to Richard West (1716–1742) in which he writes, "After the play we were introduced to the assembly, which they [viz., the Italians] call the conversazione".

== Historical usage in Britain ==
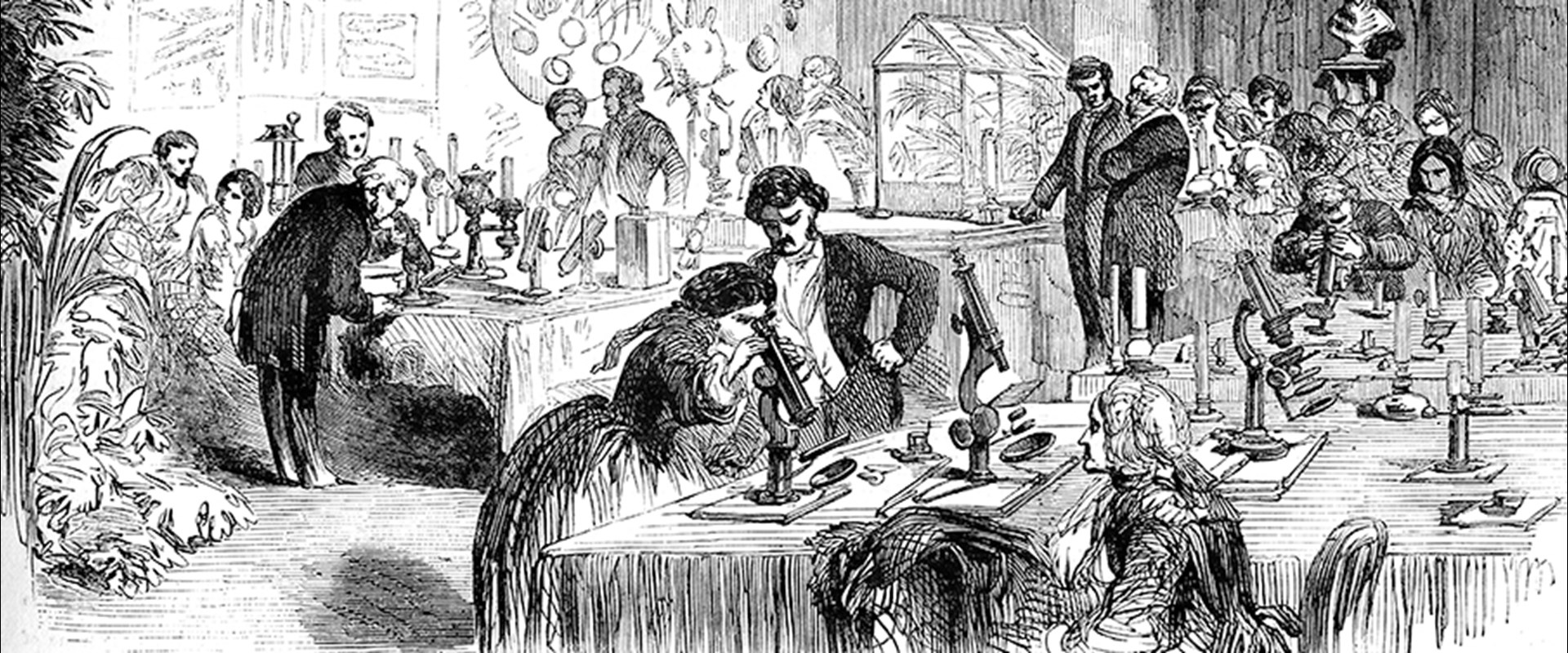
A scientific conversazione on microscopy held at Apothecaries' Hall London on 11 April 1855

In Italy, the term generally refers to a gathering for conversation; and was first used in English to identify the sort of private social gathering more generally known today as an "At Home".

In England, however, it soon came to be far more widely used to denote the gatherings of a far more intellectual character and was applied in the more specific sense of a scientific, artistic, or literary assembly/soirée, generally held at night.

A conversazione like everything else has undergone conspicuous development in these days.
Formerly the word was applicable only to a meeting of cognoscenti, who were themselves proficient in some art or science which might be the immediate subject of learned interest.
At the present time the materials for discussion are supplied by the proficients, and the general public are invited to provide the talk or the criticism.
Moreover a "conversation" of this kind is not limited to a specific subject, but may comprise topics incidental to any branch of science and art whatever. (New Zealand Herald, 17 September 1880.)

In its report on the first conversazione ever conducted by the Lambeth Literary Institution (on 22 June 1836), The Gentleman's Magazine noted that,

the principal object [of the Lambeth Literary Institution's inaugural conversazione] has been—by the collection of articles of virtù, antiquity, science, or art, and by the reading of original papers, conversation, and music,— to unite its members, at stated periods, into one focus of neighbourly community; where all may be on a footing of social equality,—the aristocracy of mind, united with urbanity of manners, alone maintaining its ascendancy here; where the high attainments of the classical scholar,—the lofty imaginings of the poet,—the deep researches of the man of science,—and the sturdy intelligence of the skilful artizan [sic], may all be amalgamated under one roof; and the rough energies of manly intellect be thus softened and refined by the amenities of the social circle.

== Knowledge dissemination ==
According to Yeates (2018):

In Victorian England, the conversazione was one of the most important educational, cultural, and recreational means through which scientific knowledge was disseminated and explanations of technical innovation were delivered to the general public.
Conducted by individuals, institutions, or learned bodies, a (usually mixed amateur/expert, male/female) audience was enlightened by explanations, two-way interactions with participants, experiments, demonstrations, hands-on displays of equipment, and/or the exhibition of specimens (see Alberti, 2003; and Plunkett & Sullivan, 2012).
The conversazione’s lectures/explanations delivered knowledge by description, and its experiments, demonstrations, hands-on displays of equipment, and exhibition of specimens delivered knowledge by acquaintance (with the concomitant psychological ownership of the knowledge so-acquired).

== Other uses ==
=== University of Cambridge ===
- The intellectual society at Cambridge University known as the Apostles was founded in 1820 as the Conversazione Society by George Tomlinson.
- The Cambridge University Natural History Society continues to call its annual public exhibition a Conversazione.

=== Conversazione.org ===
The arts-orientated social media website Conversazione.org takes its name from the English meaning.

== See also ==
- Le Conversazioni – an anglophone literary festival held on the island of Capri, Italy
- Public awareness of science
- Science communication
- The Cambridge Apostles also known as the Cambridge Conversazione Society
- Sacra conversazione – (holy or sacred conversation), a genre developed in Italian Renaissance painting, with a depiction of the Virgin and Child amidst a group of saints

== Bibliography ==
- Alberti, Samuel J.M.M. (2003), "Conversaziones and the Experience of Science in Victorian England". Journal of Victorian Culture 8.2): 208-30. doi:10.3366/jvc.2003.8.2.208
- de Clerq, Peter (2003), "Scientific instruments displayed at the Royal Society conversazioni or soirées in the nineteenth century", in Marco Beretta, Paolo Galluzzi and Carlo Triarico (eds.), Musa Musaei: Studies on Scientific Instruments and Collections in Honour of Mara Miniati, (Florence), Biblioteca di Nuncius Studi e Testi XLIX, pp.395–405.
- Hartrick, Elizabeth (2008), "'Curiosities and rare scientific instruments': Colonial conversazioni in Australia and New Zealand in the 1870s and 1880s", pp.11.1–11.19 in Seize the Day: Exhibitions, Australia and the World, edited by Kate Darian-Smith, Richard Gillespie, Caroline Jordan, and Elizabeth Willis, Elizabeth, Monash University ePress, (Melbourne).
- Plunkett, J., & Sullivan, J.A. (2012), "Fetes, Bazaars and Conversaziones: Science, Entertainment and Local Civic Elites", in J. Kember, J. Plunkett, and J.A. Sullivan (eds.), Popular Exhibitions, Science and Showmanship, 1840-1910, (pp.41–60). Pittsburgh, PA: University of Pittsburgh Press.
- Wood, Jane (2006), "A Culture of Improvement: Knowledge, Aesthetic Consciousness, and the Conversazione", Nineteenth Century Studies, Vol.20, pp.79-97.
- Yeates, Lindsay B., "James Braid (II): Mesmerism, Braid’s Crucial Experiment, and Braid’s Discovery of Neuro-Hypnotism", Australian Journal of Clinical Hypnotherapy and Hypnosis, Vol.40, No.1, (Autumn 2018), pp.40-92.
