= Organizational digital identity =

Concept in social psychology

Organizational digital identity is a collectively shared digital identity prototype in organizations, consisting of fondness towards digital technology and the related social identification. The concept was first introduced by Ricarda Bouncken at the iBegin conference in Copenhagen 2019. The concept fuses ideas from identity theory, social identity theory, and organizational identity theory, and connects them with the impact of digital technologies on individuals as well as organizations.

Identification processes with digital technologies are also observed in nascent industries where they lead to open knowledge exchanges between different groups and initially unconnected audiences. This shared digital identity is specified as "the collective self-concept(s) of an in-group towards the creation, emergence, application, and development of digital technology built on a sense of community, enthusiasm, being part of something special as well as common values and norms"
