= History of organizations =

The history of organizations describes the general history of the rise of the organization.

== Early history ==
Since earliest times humanity has endeavoured to develop the most appropriate systems of organization to meet the challenges of a particular era. Inevitably the systems of organization that developed were reflections of the wider values, tradition and general organization of society at that time, moulded by the necessity of withstanding threat and seeking to innovate whilst maximising benefits from existing resources. Human development has continually necessitated a corollary of human and organizational development designed to maximize effectiveness. This progression is indicative of a civilizing process that has continually asked humanity to reassess its relationship with itself and to increasingly value the welfare of both the individual and wider society as a whole. The symbiotic relationship between strategic leadership and organizational structure necessary to success can be traced back to the beginnings of western civilization. Indeed, the very term strategic owes its etymology to the ancient Greek words for 'army' or a 'large body' and a 'leader'. In ancient Greece the 'Strategikos' was the leader of the army.

== Industrial Revolutions ==
In 1776 the political economist Adam Smith wrote on how specialization can boost human productivity enormously. By specializing, people can use their talents, or acquire skill. And they can employ labour-saving machinery to boost production. Smith's view was borne out by the effects of mass industrialization in the late 18th century which caused great change in how people worked and how work was organized. On this topic Lynda Gratton, the organizational theorist, describes the "fundamental and irreversible shift which changed the experiences of every worker." She states that prior to the Industrial Revolution, work was an "artisan activity engaged largely in the home, using long held and meticulously developed craft skills." According to Gratton these skills "began to be transformed as the manufacturing sector was developed and began to transcend the limits of artisanal production".

The late 18th and early 19th century was a period where the artisan and the agricultural worker gave way to the burgeoning factory units that were beginning to emerge. The enclosure of vast tracts of commonage in the countryside facilitated a move from pastoral farming to grazing – forcing many from the land, often in dire circumstances. This growing trend of migration from the rural to the urban witnessed the growth of the metropolis, and the industrialized city. The growth of a mass society meant that the relationship with work was altered, it now became much more time centred and precise – a standardized approach was in the process of being developed.

Alongside the migration of workers to the new factories largely situated around energy sources and communication networks – coal deposits and canals etc. this period witnessed the emergence of global corporations situated in key centres such as London and Paris, as trade followed the flag in a wave of colonization. The shift from coal to oil as the primary energy source for industry coupled with the decolonization of empires in the 20th century would witness shifting paradigms in the power relationships between major states. The issue of empire is important in the sense that economic advantages accrued through imperialism were a cornerstone in the advent of modernity, and the enforced homogeneity achieved through Empire coupled with the technological improvements in transport and technology that it funded made the world a lot smaller and lot more similar.

Whilst recognising the significant impacts that the Industrial Revolution had, Gratton states that the "real revolution" in people's working lives began in the mid-to-late-19th century when British scientists drove a culture of innovation with the ideas of organisational and technological restructuring based on changes in the energy that powered industry. Joel Mokyr puts a timeframe of 1870-1914 on this "Second Industrial Revolution", the concept introduced by Patrick Geddes in his work Cities in Evolution. According to Gratton: "Work became more regimented, more specialised. The workplace and the work schedule became more compartmentalised and hierarchical." Gratton states that this was 'the embryonic stages of Fordism – the rise of the engineer as the organiser of economic activity, and the decline of the artisan.

== Fordism ==
Fordism, named after Henry Ford, is "a model of economic expansion and technological progress based on mass production: the manufacture of standardized products in huge volumes using special purpose machinery and unskilled labor". The major advantages of this approach was that it cut down on the manpower necessary for the factory to operate, not to mention that it deskilled the labour itself, cutting down on costs of production.

According to Gratton, "in this second Industrial Revolution, engineers redesigned factories to make employees fit into the production line. By doing so workers lost their autonomy, becoming simply as interchangeable as the parts they created".

Whilst Fordism emerged in the United States, it was preceded in Europe by Taylorism. Taylor's main objective was to improve economic efficiency, especially labor productivity. He analyzed how specific jobs might be done more efficiently. He broke down manual tasks into a series of components that could be measured. Peter Drucker who, during the 20th century was known as the 'father of modern management' said that Taylor was "the first man in history who did not take work for granted, but looked at it and studied it. His approach to work is still the basic foundation."

== Post-Fordism ==
Production methods based on Fordism are no longer the primary method of industrial production. There are three main driving forces behind the emergence of 'Post-Fordism.' They are the rising of new technologies, internationalization and the paradigm shift from Fordism to post-Fordism. Post Fordism is based on flexible production, rising incomes for polyvalent skilled workers and the service class and increased profits based on technological and other innovations. Also post-Fordism accumulation will be more oriented to worldwide demand, not so much on demand within a state. Post-Fordism is more demand than supply-driven. As a labour process, post-Fordism can be defined as a flexible production process based on flexible systems and an appropriately flexible workforce.

== Modernity ==
The birth of modernity as it has been termed in the late 19th early 20th century presaged a period of incredible industrial, technical and intellectual advancement that was to completely alter mankind's relationship with and perception of time and space. Many of the technologies that we take for granted today can be seen as developments from scientific and technical breakthroughs achieved in the period between 1890 and 1920. The birth of the railroad (which dates back to the early 19th century), and later the automobile, was to lead to seismic changes in the manner and means in which the organization of the various units of human enterprise were to be restructured, from warfare to commerce. Mankind's new outer relationship with time would be best captured by the birth of the railroad and our inner relationship with time through the development of modernist literature, with its stream of consciousness. The parallel growth of industrial capitalism would lead to the identification of time as money. The speed of travel would see the subsuming of local time-zones into railway times. The American Civil War is regarded as the first modern conflict, as notwithstanding the massive casualties and periods of trench warfare, the mass movement of men and munitions by rail provided the genesis for the logistical capability that would contribute to the mechanization of warfare inevitability leading to the slaughter of World War I.

== World War II ==
World War II represents something of a tipping point in terms of its impact on the development of industrial organization and leadership. Just as the conflict precipitated incredible technological advancements in areas such as radar, computing and the development of the jet engine so it was for leadership models, particularly in the areas of communications and efficiency. The primary models and experience of leadership and organizational structure for the post war leaders of the business world were from the military in WWII, with the majority of Post War managers drawing on their military training as a model for organizational development.

== Post war management & organizational development ==
Frederick Winslow Taylor's 1911 The Principles of Scientific Management paved the way for the recognition of management as a scientific subject, with the MIT Sloan School of Management opening in 1914. However, organizational theorists such as Charles Handy and Henry Mintzberg both decry the lack of leadership and management training in the post WWII period. Handy in particular records how in his early career as an executive he was forced to rely on his formal academic training in Roman and Greek Classics as grounding for his management training. It would not be until some-time after WWII that the education of executives would be addressed in a critical manner. This would in time give birth to the management guru, with major implications for the science and theory of management and organizational development.

== Social, technical, environmental & political forces as modern shapers ==
The growth of 'gentle commerce' interspersed with political and social thought processes to the degree that by the late 20th century, in a globalized interdependent economy, cooperation between nation states and trading blocs is the norm (notwithstanding the obvious aberrations of the rule); thankfully humanity has advanced beyond Clausewitz' dictum that decreed war as no more than politics in another manifestation to the degree that it is no longer acceptable for Democracies to use force to achieve political aims.

Against this developing socio-political backdrop, organizations have continued to evolve. The contemporary zeitgeist suggests the developed world is primarily governed by social democracies, is hugely interdependent whilst engulfed in a tidal wave of endemic technological innovation and advances that will carry it into uncharted waters. All this alongside a growing sense of awareness of a global environmental threat, diminishing supplies of carbon fuels coupled in all too many instances with an existential crisis, that asks what is it all about?

== Contemporary organisational innovation ==
A prime example of progression from the antiquated hierarchical structures with its layers of middle management staffed by gate keepers congesting the flow of communications can be found in the 2008 Presidential Campaign conducted by Barack Obama. Obama's team harnessed the potential of social media to create a flat structure. Local activists were communicated with directly from campaign headquarters. Individuals became leaders in their own domain. They were able to access campaign material, and register supporters immediately upon accessing material provided online via the campaign website.

This innovative form of campaign allowed Obama to raise $750 million, primarily from small donors, along with registering one and half million volunteer campaign workers in twenty seven thousand campaign groups. However, following the appointment of Jim Messina as the campaign manager for the 2012 Presidential campaign the 2008 strategy was declared antiquated – indeed Steven Spielberg reportedly advised Messina to blow up the 2008 campaign it was so out of date.

In a future where any task that can be described as predictable or repetitive will invariably be delegated to forms of artificial intelligence, the old hierarchical command and control systems will become largely redundant. Success will be premised on speed and innovation, on the ability of organizations to synthesize real time information and perform strategic pivots that will allow immediate access to new opportunities. The 2012 Presidential election presaged how this may look in practice. Whilst the campaign remained grassroots oriented, continuing to harness social media, the engine behind the effort was a metrics driven campaign. The sheer magnitude of the data organizing effort was staggering, but all within one single comprehensive database.

In what was the largest political campaign in US political history, the technical staff utilized consumer data along with demographic information to devise a more accurate model of the electorate – in small slices. By taking cognizance of the 'Long Tail' of human preferences, analysts were able to develop micro campaigns that targeted key demographic groupings that many had predicted would not vote due to the impact of the economic downturn and high unemployment that underscored the administration's failure to deliver a quality of prose in government that had been promised by the poetry of the campaign. By identifying who the voter actually was through data mining and attaching a support score of 1–100 for each individual voter, the campaign team were able to build a macro picture of the election by breaking it down in its component parts.

The campaign itself became an evolutionary process designed to react to 'just in time information' that allowed the campaign to pivot in a new strategic direction to meet identified demand. This development from rigid hierarchical structures to an infrastructure deliberately designed to support innovative, but empirical evidenced decision making, represents the future of organizational development. Steve Jobs spoke of the need for future organizations to be run by ideas not hierarchies.

== See also ==
- Outline of organizational theory
