= Journal of Applied Psychology =

- Discipline: Applied psychology
- Language: English
- Edited by: Lillian Eby

Publication details
- History: 1917-present
- Publisher: American Psychological Association (United States)
- Frequency: Monthly
- Impact factor: 7.429 (2020)

Standard abbreviations
- ISO 4: J. Appl. Psychol.

Indexing
- ISSN: 0021-9010 (print); 1939-1854 (web)
- LCCN: 19012586
- OCLC no.: 476130184

Links
- Journal homepage

The Journal of Applied Psychology is a monthly, peer-reviewed academic journal published by the American Psychological Association. The journal emphasizes the publication of original investigations that contribute new knowledge and understanding to fields of applied psychology (other than clinical and applied experimental or human factors, which are more appropriate for other American Psychological Association journals). The journal primarily considers empirical and theoretical investigations that enhance understanding of cognitive, motivational, affective, and behavioral psychological phenomena." The editor-in-chief is Lillian Eby (University of Georgia).

The journal has implemented the Transparency and Openness Promotion (TOP) Guidelines. The TOP Guidelines provide structure to research planning and reporting and aim to make research more transparent, accessible, and reproducible.

== Abstracting and indexing ==
According to the Journal Citation Reports, the journal has a 2020 impact factor of 7.429.

Journal of Applied Psychology is indexed in:

- PsycINFO
- MEDLINE
- SCOPUS
