= Howard E. Aldrich =

American sociologist (born 1943)

- Born: 1943 (age 82–83)

Academic background
- Education: Bowling Green State University (BA); University of Michigan (MA, 1966; PhD, 1969)
- Thesis: Organizations in a hostile environment: A panel study of small businesses in three cities (1969)
- Doctoral advisor: Albert J. Reiss

Academic work
- Institutions: Cornell University; University of North Carolina at Chapel Hill; Duke University
- Website: howardaldrich.org

Howard Earl Aldrich (born 1943) is an American sociologist who is Kenan Professor of Sociology Emeritus at the University of North Carolina at Chapel Hill, where he retired in 2024. He is also a Faculty Research Associate at the Department of Strategy & Entrepreneurship at the Duke University Fuqua School of Business and a Fellow of Sidney Sussex College, University of Cambridge, and a Fellow of the Center for the Study of Economy and Society at Cornell University. Aldrich's main research interests are entrepreneurship, team formation, evolutionary theory, economic sociology and inequality, and gender issues in entrepreneurship. He is known for applying an evolutionary perspective to organizational emergence and change. His 1999 book Organizations Evolving won the Academy of Management's George R. Terry Award and was co-winner of the American Sociological Association Section on Organizations, Occupations, and Work's Max Weber Book Award.

== Early career ==
Aldrich received his BA in sociology from Bowling Green State University in 1965, and his MA (1966) and PhD (1969) from the University of Michigan. In 1966, he directed a survey project through the University of Michigan's Institute for Social Research, which explored ethnic succession in the small business populations of high-crime areas of Boston, Washington, D.C., and Chicago. Aldrich carried out subsequent waves of the study in 1968 and presented his dissertation, titled Organizations in a Hostile Environment, for his 1969 PhD. This study led to follow-up studies in 1970 and 1972, in a collaboration with Albert J. Reiss Jr. Following the completion of his dissertation in 1969, Aldrich accepted an assistant professorship at Cornell University's School of Industrial and Labor Relations. There he began to further develop his evolutionary perspectives on organizational theory and wrote a number of papers that explored context as a driver for organizational change, including "Organizational Boundaries and Inter-Organizational Conflict" (1971); this work eventually formed the basis for his 1979 book, Organizations and Environments.

Following up on his earlier studies in the US, in 1975 Aldrich also undertook comparative research on ethnic business in the UK, supported by a Ford Foundation grant for a study of Asian small businesses in London. Later waves of the research, published in 1985 and 1989, examined residential concentration, ecological succession, and the development of Asian-owned businesses in English cities. These studies also ultimately formed the basis of his 1990 book Ethnic Entrepreneurs, co-authored with Roger Waldinger and Robin Ward.

== Evolutionary perspective on entrepreneurship ==
Aldrich's work has presented, developed, and refined an evolutionary approach to organizational behavior and entrepreneurship. The approach uses the concepts of variation, selection, retention, and struggle, the last referring to the competition of entrepreneurs and organizations for scarce resources. Aldrich's perspective was developed throughout the 1970s, at a time when evolutionary models were increasingly being applied in organizational research. He became interested in entrepreneurship in the mid-1980s, when he was invited to contribute a chapter on social networks, written with Catherine Zimmer, to a 1986 volume on entrepreneurship. His evolutionary perspective was developed more fully in three editions of his book Organizations Evolving, published in 1999, 2006, and 2020 (the third edition with coauthors Martin Ruef and Stephen Lippmann). In 2025, he published a review of developments in evolutionary theorizing over the previous decade with coauthors Martin Ruef and Colin Birkhead.

== Career at the University of North Carolina ==
Aldrich moved from Cornell University to the Department of Sociology at the University of North Carolina at Chapel Hill in 1982. He chaired the Curriculum in Management and Society from 1984 until 2003.

In 2003, Aldrich became chair of the Department of Sociology, serving until 2014. In his own account of the period, he describes the department's faculty growing from about 20 to nearly 26 full-time-equivalent members, the creation of several new endowed funds, and the digitization of departmental records.

Under his chairmanship, the department's journal, Social Forces, which had been published in cooperation with the University of North Carolina Press, was brought under direct departmental management, then self-published, and then contracted to Oxford University Press as publisher.

His doctoral students at Cornell University include David A. Whetten, Sergio Mindlin, Ellen R. Auster, Donna Fish, and Udo H. Staber. His doctoral students at UNC include Pat R. Reese, Ted Baker, Stephen Lippmann, Amanda B. Elam, Amy Davis, Junko Shimazoe, Phillip H. Kim, Linda Renzulli, and Tiantian Yang. Aldrich retired in 2024 and holds the title Kenan Professor of Sociology Emeritus.

== Honors and awards ==
Aldrich's honors include:

- Entrepreneurship Researcher of the Year Award, Swedish Foundation of Small Business Research, 2000
- Distinguished Scholar Award, Academy of Management Organization and Management Theory Division, 2000
- George R. Terry Award, Academy of Management, for the best management book published in 1999
- Max Weber Book Award (co-winner), Section on Organizations, Occupations, and Work, American Sociological Association, 2000
- J. Carlyle Sitterson Freshman Teaching Award, University of North Carolina at Chapel Hill, 2002
- Mentor Award, Academy of Management Entrepreneurship Division, 2007
- Foundational Paper Award, Academy of Management Entrepreneurship Division, 2009, for a paper co-authored with C. Marlene Fiol, "Fools Rush In? The Institutional Context of Industry Creation"
- Lifetime Member Award, Babson College Entrepreneurship Research Conference, 2013
- Honorary doctorate, Mid Sweden University, Östersund, 2014
- Honorary Doctor of Social Sciences, Bowling Green State University, 2015
- Distinguished Contributions to Teaching Award, American Sociological Association, 2017
- Rosabeth Moss Kanter Distinguished Career Award, Section on Organizations, Occupations, and Work, American Sociological Association, 2018
- Foundational Paper Award, Academy of Management Entrepreneurship Division, 2021, with Jennifer Jennings, for "The Pervasive Effects of Family on Entrepreneurship: Toward a Family Embeddedness Perspective" (2003)

=== Advisory board service ===
Aldrich has been a member of the scientific committee of the Center for Young and Family Enterprise at the University of Bergamo, Italy.

Aldrich was named to the international advisory board of the Journal of Institutional Economics before its launch in 2005 and remains listed as a member. He was also a founding/advisory board member of the Strategic Entrepreneurship Journal in 2007. Since 2014 he has been an editor of the Entrepreneur & Innovation Exchange (EIX), an online platform for entrepreneurship and innovation research.

== Selected books ==
- Organizations and Environments (Prentice-Hall, 1979). First edition. ISBN 978-0-13-641431-5
- Organizations and Environments. Reprinted by Stanford University Press in its Stanford Business Classics series, with a new introduction, 2007. ISBN 978-0-8047-5829-1
- Organizations Evolving (Sage, 1999)
- Ethnic Entrepreneurs: Immigrant Business in Industrial Societies, co-authored with Roger Waldinger and Robin Ward (Sage, 1990). ISBN 978-0-8039-3710-9
- Organizations Evolving, second edition, co-authored with Martin Ruef (Sage, 2006). ISBN 978-1-4129-1047-7
- Organizations Evolving, third edition, co-authored with Martin Ruef and Stephen Lippmann (Edward Elgar, 2020)
- An Evolutionary Approach to Entrepreneurship: Selected Essays (Edward Elgar, 2012). ISBN 978-0-85793-846-6

== Selected articles ==
- Kim, Phillip H.; Aldrich, Howard E. (2005). "Social Capital and Entrepreneurship". Foundations and Trends in Entrepreneurship. Now Publishers.
- Aldrich, Howard E.; Kim, Phillip H. (2007). "A Life Course Perspective on Occupational Inheritance: Self-employed Parents and Their Children". Research in the Sociology of Organizations 25: 33–82. Elsevier JAI.
- Aldrich, H. E.; Hodgson, G. M.; Hull, D. L.; Knudsen, T.; Mokyr, J.; Vanberg, V. J. (2008). "In Defence of Generalized Darwinism". Journal of Evolutionary Economics 18 (5): 577–596.
- Shimazoe, Junko; Aldrich, Howard E. (2010). "Group Work Can Be Gratifying: Understanding & Overcoming Resistance to Cooperative Learning". College Teaching 58.
- Bradley, Steven W.; Aldrich, Howard E.; Shepherd, Dean A.; Wiklund, Johan (2011). "Resources, Environmental Change, and Survival: Asymmetric Paths of Young Independent and Subsidiary Organizations". Strategic Management Journal 32 (5): 486–509.
- Aldrich, Howard E.; Yang, Tiantian (2012). "Lost in Translation: Cultural Codes Are Not Blueprints". Strategic Entrepreneurship Journal 6 (1): 1–17.
- Aldrich, Howard E. (2012). "The Emergence of Entrepreneurship as an Academic Field: A Personal Essay on Institutional Entrepreneurship". Research Policy 41 (7): 1240–1248.
- Wry, Tyler; Cobb, J. Adam; Aldrich, Howard E. (2013). "More Than a Metaphor: Assessing the Historical Legacy of Resource Dependence and Its Contemporary Promise as a Theory of Environmental Complexity". Academy of Management Annals 7 (1): 439–486.
- Yang, Tiantian; Aldrich, Howard E. (2014). "Who's the Boss? Explaining Gender Inequality in Entrepreneurial Teams". American Sociological Review 79 (2): 303–327.
- Lippmann, Stephen; Aldrich, Howard E. (2014). "History and Evolutionary Theory". In Bucheli, Marcelo; Wadhwani, R. Daniel (eds.). Organizations in Time: History, Theory, Methods. Oxford University Press. pp. 124–146.
- Stewart, Alex; Aldrich, Howard E. (2015). "Collaboration between Anthropology and Management Researchers: Obstacles and Opportunities". Academy of Management Perspectives 29 (2): 173–192.
- Aldrich, Howard E. (2015). "Perpetually on the Eve of Destruction? Understanding Exits in Capitalist Societies at Multiple Levels of Analysis". In DeTienne, Dawn R.; Wennberg, Karl (eds.). Research Handbook of Entrepreneurial Exit. Edward Elgar. pp. 11–41.
- Aldrich, Howard E.; Brumana, Mara; Campopiano, Giovanna; Minola, Tommaso (2021). "Embedded but not asleep: Entrepreneurship and family business research in the 21st century". Journal of Family Business Strategy 12 (1).
- Aldrich, Howard E.; Birkhead, Colin; Ruef, Martin (2025). "Evolutionary Perspectives on Entrepreneurship". In Sorenson, Olav; Thornton, Patricia H. (eds.). De Gruyter Handbook of Sociology of Innovation and Entrepreneurship. De Gruyter Brill. pp. 61–80.
