= Meta-organization =

Organization with other organizations as its members

Meta-organization is defined as an organization with other organizations as its members. This concept was developed in 2005 by Göran Ahrne and Nils Brunsson. They further elaborated and underpinned the concept theoretically in 2008 by focusing on explaining what difference it makes to have organizations as members instead of individuals.

In the years since, the concept has become a bridging concept, engaging those who study international organizations, associations, cooperatives, alliances, partnerships, and other inter-organizational collaborations in which organizations are the members of another organization. The concept has thereby helped to connect, consolidate and develop new insights from different fields about meta-organizations. The concept has attracted contributions from organization studies, sociology, management studies public administration political science (in particular international relations), social movement studies, but also getting engagement from communications studies, education studies and supply chain management among others.

Meta-organization studies focus broadly on questions related to how meta-organizations organize and function and what the consequences are thereof, more specifically, how, when and in which ways meta-organizations impact their members, non-members or society at large. More generally, it asks what kind of dynamic “having organizations as members” creates and what that means for how these organizations behave.

Those interested in the concept of meta-organization and developing theory explaining them have been gathering at the European Group of Organization Studies - EGOS colloquium, currently as a standing working group (https://www.egos.org/SWGs/SWG-01) and regularly engage at the International Sociology Association (ISA) conferences (particularly as part of RO17 – Sociology of Organizations). In addition, workshops and other gatherings are organized gathering those interested into one place. Updates on activities and publications are given on the LinkedIn group page (https://www.linkedin.com/groups/9391069/).
