= Organizational identification =

Organizational identification (OI) is a term used in management studies and organizational psychology. The term refers to the propensity of a member of an organization to identify with that organization. OI has been distinguished from "affective organizational commitment". Measures of an individual's OI have been developed, based on questionnaires.

== Definitions of identification and organizational identification ==
Cheney and Tompkins state that identification is "the appropriation of identity, either by

1. the individual or collective in question
2. by others.

Identification includes "the development and maintenance of an individual's or group's 'sameness' or 'substance' against a backdrop of change and 'outside' elements." Salient symbolic linkages (through communication) are important to identification, identification is a process, and the nature of a particular individual's or group's identification with something is continually changing. Identification, to organizations or anything else, is "an active process by which individuals link themselves to elements in a social scene" and identifications help us make sense of our world and thoughts and help us to make decisions. The process of identification occurs largely through language as one expresses similarities or affiliations with particular groups, including organizations.

Phillip Tompkins was one of the first to use the phrase 'organizational identification' and is a pioneer in the study of organizational communication. Simon has also been given credit for establishing organizational identification in theory and scholarship. Notions of organizational identity started with broader thinking about self-identity and identification in general. After a number of years of research into identity and identification in organizations, Cheney and Tompkins clarified the application of these concepts in organizations.

OI is a form of organizational control and happens when "a decision maker identifies with an organization [and] desires to choose the alternative which best promotes the perceived interests of that organization". Other authors have defined OI as an alignment of individual and organizational values, as well as the perception of oneness with and belongingness to the organization. OI has been researched as an individual's view and classification of self in terms of organizational membership. Social identity theory has combined the cognitive elements of OI described above with affective and evaluative components. For example, emotional attachment, feelings of pride, and other positive emotions that are derived from organizational membership have been incorporated in the operationalization of OI.

O’Reilly and Chatman conceptualized OI in terms of affective and motivational processes. They argued that OI arises from attraction and desire to maintain an emotionally satisfying, self-defining relationship with the organization. Perhaps the most comprehensive definition of OI would conceptualize it as a perceptual link to an organization. This link is established by employees through various cognitive and affective processes that occur as employees and an organization (including all its constituents—co-workers, supervisors) interact. While the widening of OI helps to discover additional sources and processes via which OI can be established, it also complicates the distinction between OI and other constructs — namely, affective organizational commitment — in IO psychology research.

== Implications of Organizational Identification ==
Organizational identification correlates to the relationship between self-identification and commitment to an organization. Organizational identification instills positive outcomes for work attitudes and behaviors including motivation, job performance and satisfaction, individual decision making, and employee interaction and retention. Employee satisfaction and retention have implications for productivity, efficiency, effectiveness and profit.

Ashforth, Harrison and Corley offer four reasons why organizational identification is important. First, it is important to concepts of self-identity: it is one way in which people come to define themselves, make sense of their place in the world and appropriately navigate their worlds. Second, there is an essential human need to identify with and feel part of a larger group, and identifying with an organization fulfills this need, as well as the need to enhance self. Third, OI is associated with a number of important organizational outcomes, including employee satisfaction, performance and retention. Although recent research has begun to explore the potentially negative outcomes of OI, including reduced creativity and resistance to change. Finally, links have been made between OI and other organizational behaviors, including leadership, perceptions of justice and the meaning of work.

The strength of an employee's identification with a company can be linked to the organization member's attitudes. Issue such as company policies, rules, communicated mission values and strategy all interplay in employee's identification. The field of organization identification studies and questions organizational control of employees through efforts to increase or improve organizational identification.

Cheney states that organizational policies actually affect the development of identification "in terms of what is communicated to the employee". "Organizational identification guides behavior by influencing which problems and alternatives are seen and by biasing choices that appear most salient to organizational success".

Organizations choose to communicate particular values and beliefs in particular ways, when and how the organization frames issues and activities. Organizational identity and self-identification can determine if an employee is fit for that organization.

== Organizational identification and affective organizational commitment ==
van Knippenberg and Sleebos separate OI and affective organizational commitment by narrowing the scope of the former. Identification is a cognitive/perceptual construct reflecting self-reference. Commitment reflects an attitude toward the organization and its members. Identification is self-definitional and implies psychological oneness with the organization. Commitment implies a relationship in which both individual and organization are separate entities.

Meyer and Allen created a three-component model of organizational commitment: affective, continuance, and normative. OI and affective organizational commitment are closely related and interchangeable constructs. In his meta-analysis, Riketta examined the extent of the overlap between OI and affective organizational commitment across 96 independent samples. He found a significant and very strong positive correlation between OI and affective organizational commitment (r = .78). This suggests that the average OI study had significant construct overlaps with affective organizational commitment. Nonetheless, Riketta argued that OI and affective organizational commitment could be distinguished because they differentially relate to several organizational outcomes. Such differences were most pronounced in studies where OI was measured by the Mael and Ashforth's scale, which leaves out an emotional attachment component while focusing on employee perception of oneness with and belongingness to the organization. In such studies, OI compared to affective organizational commitment, measured by the affective commitment scale, correlated less strongly with job satisfaction (r = .47 vs. r =.65) and intent to leave (r = -.35 vs. r = -.56), but more strongly with job involvement (r = .60 vs. r = .53) and extra-role performance (r = .39 vs. r = .23).

OI is measured by the OI questionnaire, the correlation between OI and intent to leave was stronger than the correlation between affective organizational commitment and intent to leave (r = -.64 vs. r = -.56). In addition, OI had a much stronger association with age (r = .60 vs. r = .15), but there were no differences in how both OI and affective organizational commitment correlated with job satisfaction (r = .68).

== Measures of organizational identification ==
From Riketta's meta-analytic review, we can deduce that Mael and Ashworth's OI measure is narrower and more distinct from the affective organizational commitment, while the OI questionnaire has more overlap with the affective organizational commitment. In addition, Mael and Ashworth's OI measure may be more useful than either the OI questionnaire or affective commitment scale when examining or predicting employee extra role behavior and job involvement. However, the OI questionnaire is a better indicator of employee intentions to leave the organization than either the affective commitment scale or Mael and Ashworth's OI measure.

Edwards and Peccei developed an OI measure that taps into three separate but closely related factors of OI. The three factors include:

1. the categorization of the self as an organizational member
2. the integration of the organization's goals and values
3. the development of an emotional attachment, belongingness, and membership to the organization.

Appropriately, these three factors incorporate the main components from OI definitions throughout OI research thus far. Because each factor was measured by two separate items, Edwards and Peccei were able to conduct confirmatory factor analysis for their three factor model fit across two independent samples.

Their results indicate the lack of discriminant validity among the three factors of OI. And although the model with three underlying dimensions of OI fits the data slightly better, the one factor model also yields satisfactory fit. In other words, while it may be useful to conceptualize OI in terms of three main components, these components are strongly correlated. Therefore, for the practical purposes of OI measurement, Edwards and Peccei suggest creating a composite or aggregate of the three dimensions and using the six-item measure as a single overall scale of OI.

== Antecedents ==
=== Perceived organizational support ===
One of the antecedents to OI is perceived organizational support (POS), or “the extent to which individuals believe that their employing organization values their contribution and cares for their well-being”. Edwards and Peccei argued that when organizations show concern for their employees’ well being, there will be a tendency for these individuals to develop an attachment and identify with the organization. The relationship between OI and perceived organizational support further develops as OI mediates the relationship between perceived organizational support and organizational involvement.

=== Organizational prestige ===
Similarly to perceived organizational support, the organization's prestige is an antecedent to OI, for as the organization becomes well regarded, the employee “basks in reflected glory” and gladly identifies with its reputation and goals. The stereotypes of the organization reflect central beliefs and missions of the organization. Further, these stereotypes allow for an individual to indirectly identify with the goals of the organization. In other words, the individual identifies with the organization as the organization's ideals become his or her own. As these stereotypes become more distinct from other competing organizations, the present company becomes a more salient ideal which the employee identifies with.

=== Identity ===
Identity and identification are "root constructs in organizational phenomena" and underlie many observable organizational behaviors. Identity and identification are central to the questions of 'who am I?', 'who are we?' and 'what is my role in this world?'. In order to understand identification, one must understand identity. It has emerged in scholarly literature in three different contexts:

1. micro (social identity theory, self categorization theory)
2. identity theory (structural identity or identity control theory)
3. and organizational identity (central, distinctive characteristics of an organization).

Corporate identity has been named as another context in which identity has been discussed.

Social identity is "the part of the individual's self-concept which derives from his knowledge of his membership of a social group (or groups) together with the value and emotional significance attached to that membership". Identity theory refers to the idea that people attach different meanings and significance to the various roles that they play in "highly differentiated societies". This theory explores roles, such as one's occupation, or group membership, such as musician.

Organizational identity was famously defined by Albert and Whetten as the "central, distinctive and enduring characteristic of an organization," and consisted of three principal components: ideational, definitional and phenomenological. Organizational identity is established through communicated values to internal and external stakeholders. Organizations establish and communicate an identity in order to "control. . . how the organization is commonly represented".

Albert, Ashforth and Dutton believe that organizations must know who or what they are, what they are or are not in relation to other entities and what the relationship is between themselves and others in order for one organization to interact effectively with other organizations in the long run: “identities situate the organization, group and person”. Further, an organization must have an identity in order for its employees to identify with the organization, or to form organizational identification.

Organizations typically define who they are through value and goal statements and missions and visions. They then frame or structure most of their communication to employees and others around these values and goals. The more an employee can identify with those communicated values and goals, the more organizational identification there is. Organizations increase the chances of organizational identification by conveying and repeating a limited set of goals and values that employees not only identify with, but are constrained by when they make decisions. An organization must have an identity in order for its employees to identify with the organization, thereby creating the environment for organizational identification.

Some authors disagree that an identity is enduring, but instead is ever-changing and responsive to its environment in modern organizations. There has been some general confusion among scholars around the term, but most still agree it is a concept worth talking about.

Corporate identity is distinct from organizational identity in that it is more concerned with the visual (graphic identity) and is more a function of leadership. Organizational identity is more concerned with the internal (employee relationships to the organization) and corporate identity is concerned with the external (marketing).

As one's self-concept is created through group affiliations, the organization as a whole and one's membership to it serve as important factors in creating OI. In fact, Van Dick, Grojean, Christ, and Wieseke explain that through social identity individuals identify with their organization and claim its goals and vision as their own. Consequently, employees have more overall satisfaction as their goals and needs are fulfilled. Also, the perception of fairness serves as a key ingredient in allowing individuals to identify with their organization. In other words, if perceived fairness is not evident in the organization-employee relationship, there will be a negative influence of employee perception on the company.

=== Organizational communication ===
If an organization has open organizational communication, it will serve as an effective method to give their employees information with which to identify. Various types of communication such as horizontal and vertical communication are imperative to ensure OI. Horizontal communication is described as communication that occurs through conversations with peers and other departments of equal stature in the organization. Vertical communication describes communication through a top-down process as executives and other managers communicate organizational goals and support to their subordinates. While both are necessary for identifying with their company, vertical communication is more associated with OI, while horizontal communication encourages identification within their department, branch, or sector of the company.

=== Individual differences ===
Individual differences psychology may help explain how individual differences account for high OI, especially the need for autonomy and self-fulfillment in an organization. Hall et al. claimed that individuals who experience OI at a higher intensity do so because the jobs they assume compliment their personalities; therefore, they are more apt to identify with those jobs and organizations that provide them. In other words, individuals value particular organizational goals, such as service or autonomy, and seek the companies that have goals and values most congruent with their own. If individuals find the high level of congruency between personal and organizational goals and values, they are more likely to identify with that organization rather quickly.

== Consequences ==
=== Positive consequences ===
Even though OI is a cognitively based phenomenon, many of the consequences of OI that are investigated in psychology are behaviorally based, in that having OI causes certain behaviors and actions in response to this perception of oneness with the organization. For example, O’Reilly and Chatman found that OI is positively related to intent to remain with an organization, decreased staff turnover, length of service, and extra-role behaviors, or “acts that are not directly specified by a job description but which are of benefit to the company”. In addition, Van Dick, Grojean, Christ, and Wieseke found that the causal relationship between extra-role behaviors and OI extended to the team level as well as customer evaluations.

=== Negative consequences ===
Even though OI sets the stage for extra-role behaviors, decreased turnover and increased job performance, it may also negatively influence other aspects of job behavior. For example, Umphress, Bingham, and Mitchell argued that people who have high degrees of OI may act unethically on behalf of the organization. This phenomenon has been named unethical pro-organizational behavior. These unethical behaviors can occur through commission, where an employee exaggerates information, or omission, where an employee conceals information. Such unethical behaviors may be elicited as employees “choose to disregard personal moral standards and engage in acts that favor the organization” Since OI may provide motivation for unethical behaviors, the unethical pro-organizational behavior was only observed when the employees had positive reciprocity beliefs towards the organization (i.e. they believed that they were in a relationship of equal exchange with the organization).

== Organization identity and identification and management control ==
Issues of control are found in most activities at most levels of organizational life. Organizations can exercise simple control (direct, authoritative), technological control, and bureaucratic control (through rules and rationality). The most powerful forms of control in an organization may be those that are the least obvious or "that are 'fully unobtrusive' that 'control the cognitive premises underlying action'".

Barker calls the control described above 'concretive control,' and he believes that it largely grows out of self-managing teams who base decisions on a set of shared values and high-level coordination by the team members themselves. Concretive control, even though employee directed, actually increases the total amount of control in an organizational system because each worker is watching and correcting others, rather than one manager watching and directing the behavior of many.

One insidious, almost fully unobtrusive form of control is the organization's attempt to regulate employee identity and identification. Alvesson and Willmott explore how employee identities are regulated inside of an organization so that their self-images and work processes and products line up with management goals and objectives. Identity regulation is the "intentional effects of social practices upon processes of identity construction and reconstruction". The authors suggest that when an organization and its rules and procedures, particularly in training and promotion, become "a significant source of identification for individuals" the organizational identity is then at the core of that individual's "(self-) identity work". The conscious effort, either by the organization or the individual, to align self-image with organizational goals is organizational identification, and OI can bound an employee's decision making in a way that keeps it "compatible with affirming such identification".

Pratt talks about strong organizational values or culture and the effect a strong culture has on identification and commitment. Strong values can act as social control mechanisms, can hold together dispersed groups of workers (those that are not co-located) and can secure employee commitment in a working environment where "job security no longer serves as the cornerstone of psychological contract in the workplace". The strong values are what the workers identify with or commit to.

Organizations can manage organizational identification by managing how individuals form personal values and identities, and how those values cause them to approach relationships inside and outside of work. Organizations can do this by "creating a need for meaning via sense breaking" by causing people to question their old values against the new, better values and dreams offered by the company.

So, controlling identity and identification benefits the company because it makes for more satisfied employees who stay longer and work harder. Identity regulation by organizations can be seen through efforts to manage organizational culture through communicated values in mission and vision statements. Organizations can also create a vacuum and then a perceived need among employees for goals and values provided by the organization through sense/dream-breaking and dream-building. Finally, organizations can attempt to shape the values and identities of the workforce through self-help programs selected and instituted by the organization in the workplace, although controlling exactly how these programs are interpreted and applied can be difficult.

== Future research and applications ==
There are various applications of OI research in the field of management, for example, individuals might sense a threat to the stability and identity of the company when a merger occurs or when organizations are constantly restructuring their psychological contract with employees to stay afloat in the economic situation.

== See also ==
- Organizational culture
- Organizational Psychology
- Organizational Studies
