= Identity control theory =

Identity control theory is a theory in sociology concerned with the development of personal identity. Created by Peter Burke, it focuses on the nature of peoples' identities and the relationship between their identities and their behavior within the realm of their social structure. The identities of the individual are rooted in their social structure. Identity Control Theory was created based on traditional symbolic interaction views where people choose their own behaviors and how their behaviors correspond to the meanings of their identity. One of the main aspects ICT deals with is how individuals view their own identities and respond to the reactions to their identities of those around them. When an individual is acting according to the identity control theory they reflect on the identity they display and how others approve or disapprove of their identity. If the individual does not like the responses of others they will look at how they can change their views of their identity or their identity towards themselves to produce a positive outcome. One of the main benefits of this theory is how negative feelings can be prevented by individuals and by those around them. The people around someone who is displaying a certain identity have the ability to be more sensitive and prevent negative feelings if they understand identity control theory because they know what will bring out a negative response. On the other hand, the individual can prevent negative feelings that coincide with the teachings of identity control theory if they understand these teachings and can apply them to their own lives.

== Identity control theory components ==
There are four main components of the identity control theory being identity standard, input, comparator, and output. Each identity is viewed as a control system with these four components (Burke, 2007).

Identity standard is the first of the four components of identity control theory. Identity standard defines what it means to be who one is in a situation. The identity standard stores the self-meanings tied to social roles and membership in groups. This is the set of meanings for a given identity. The meanings in identity standard represent the goals or the way the situation is supposed to be. People act to verify or confirm their identities and in doing so they bring about a situation in which relevant meanings are consistent with their identity standard.

The next of the four components is input or also known as perceptions. Input is the meanings of how one sees oneself in a situation. These self-meanings often are derived from the way in which others see the self. This results from the feedback others have about how we come across in a given situation.

The third component of the identity control theory is comparator. The comparator compares the meanings from the input with those from the standard and registers the difference between them. This compares the perceived meanings with the meanings in the identity standard.

The final component of the theory is output or sometimes called an error or discrepancy. Output is the differences that result from the perceptions and the identity standard. Then as a function of the output, there is meaningful behavior enacted in the situation that conveys meanings about our identity. If in a setting people perceive their identity relevant meanings to be congruent with the meanings in their identity standard, that is the discrepancy is zero, people continue to do what they have been doing. If the discrepancy is not zero, people change their behavior in such a way as to counteract the disturbance and reduce the discrepancy back toward zero (Burke, 2007). These altered meanings are perceived and again compared to the meanings in the identity standard. Thus, each identity is a control system that acts to control perceptions by bringing them into congruency with the meanings of their identity standards, thus reducing toward zero any discrepancy or error caused by a disturbance (Burke, 2007).

People act to verify or confirm their identities and in doing so they bring about a situation in which perceived meanings are consistent with their identity standard. If the identity is a role identity, then the behavior that brings about the changes in the situational meanings to make them consistent with the identity standard is appropriate role behavior. If the identity is a group or category based identity, the behavior which verifies the identity is the behavior that maintains group boundaries and divisions in the social structure. By verifying identities, people create and maintain the social structure in which the identities are embedded (Burke, 2007).

== Identity control and emotions ==
As one might guess, the identity control theory has a direct correlation to an individual's emotions. This mainly stems from whether or not the person's identity is fully recognized by those around them. If they are fully recognized or recognized greatly positive emotions will be produced. On the reverse side a small amount of recognition, or a lack of recognition will produce negative emotions like anger and depression.

=== Positive Emotions ===
When people surrounding an individual are able to correctly notice the personal identity that the individual is attempting to convey the self-esteem of the individual is increased. Their disposition also becomes filled with positive emotions. Another thing that will increase positive emotions is if the people closest to the individual reassure the individual of their identity. This reassurance allows the individual to feel secure in their actions and be able to further predict the responses of others. These feelings of security allow the individual to express themselves in the manner they wish. This is why the positive emotions become so prominent for the individuals who experience this. The only other part of identity control theory that increases positive emotions is if an individual's identity matches their perceptions of their identity. This creates harmony for the individual and allows them to be happier than if their perceptions did not match the actual outcome of their identities.

=== Negative Emotions ===
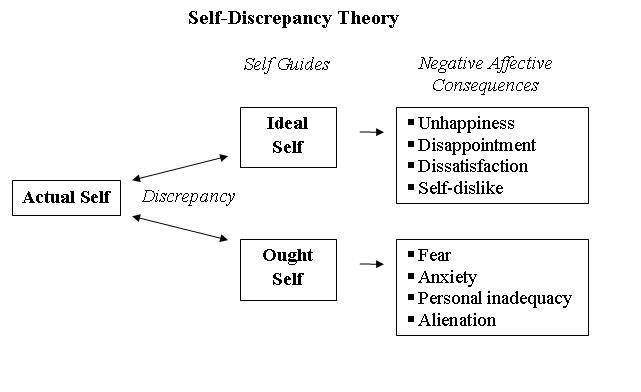
Self-Discrepancy model explaining the outcome of actual:ideal and actual:ought discrepancies experienced by restrained eaters

With the identity control theory, there is more opportunity for negative emotions than positive emotions. This is because there are many more opportunities for people to misunderstand what identity an individual is attempting to display. In fact, there are four main ways a person's identity can be misinterpreted that will produce emotions of anger and other negative aspects. These four are a discrepancy between the output and the input, a lack of attention to the identity trying to be displayed, too much control over the specific identity, and a lack of practice with the identity.

Input vs Output: When an individual's identity is not received by others as the individual intended, then the possibility for negative emotions increases. Often those around the individual place a different meaning on the identity than the person intended there to be. This causes great frustration for the individual and can often lead to anger as well. Another part of this discrepancy is if those around the individual completely ignore the identity the individual is hoping to display. The complete unrecognition will produce even more frustration and anger than an incorrect view of the identity.

Lack of Attention: If an individual does not focus enough attention on the identity they wish to portray it will not be received fully either. This usually happens because all of their attention is normally focused on another aspect of their identity and all other facets are neglected. These neglected aspects are not displayed well by the individual, so they are not received by others as the individual hoped. This is a sure way for the individual to become down upon themselves or even extremely angry with themselves for not developing that aspect of their identities and being misunderstood.

Too Much Control: When someone tries to control a certain aspect of their identity too much, they will most likely find themselves experiencing very negative feelings. This is because all the aspects of their personality are closely related because they are controlled so much. Therefore, if one aspect of their personality is not received as they had hoped, all other aspects of their personality will not be unverified. This has the potential to cause a complete identity crisis because no part of the person's identity will be reassured. This can cause the individual to panic and become filled with nervousness.

Lack of Practice: If an individual does not practice the identity they wish to convey enough, not only will they be unsure of it, those around them will be unsure of how to respond to the individual. In fact, those around the individual will most likely show great disapproval of the individual. If that does not happen, though, they will receive very irregular responses from those around them. Disapproval can severely drop the persons self-esteem or push the individual to be hostile with those around them due to their reactions. On the other hand, irregular responses can cause the individual to become frustrated with their outcome which can lead to a great deal of anger if it is repeated many times.

One final thing to remember about all emotions that can be created through the identity control theory is the degree of closeness those evaluating the identity are to the individual. If the people around the individual are very close to the individual and they assure their identity, the individual will most likely experience extreme positive emotions. However, if they criticize the identity, the individual will experience extreme negative emotions. The opposite of this, meaning that those evaluating the identity are not extremely close to the individual, the individual's emotions will not become very extreme at all. This is because the opinions of the people close to an individual hold more weight in the individual's mind than the opinions of the people they are not close to.

== Coping responses ==
Coping responses are the product of a person processing external or internal demands that can drain a person's mental or physical resources (Foulton, 1982). External demands could be need for warmth, chores around the house or job, and cleanliness. Internal demands could be hunger, happiness, and control over environment. There are two parts to coping responses: first is the process of coping responses and second is the relationship between the person and outside forces.

=== The Process ===
The process can be separated into two parts. The first is summarized by what is currently happening. This includes the person's thoughts, feelings, and actions to reduce different demands (Foulton, 1982). Demands can be jobs, chores, relationships with others, and even body functions such as eating and sleeping. With different demands, one person can act in many different ways. For instance, if two people are hungry and are having problems at work, the first person might eat first then try to fix their job situation. The second person could fix their job first and then eat later. Demands are not limited to two things at a time: there can be many demands at the same time. So each person's different actions can affect the future or how things turn out. This is the second part: how current events (what is happening) affect changes in daily life or even the person's environment over time. The environment is not just limited to the outdoors, it is also the relationships with others. Acting in a certain way will bring out a certain change in the person's life, whether in the environment or in their every day life.

=== The Relationship ===
The relationship between the person and outside forces is the second part of coping responses. This relationship can be summarized by how the person views the environment. Again, the environment is not just the outdoor life, it is also the relationships in a person's life with others. A person first evaluates what is at stake in the environment. Beliefs, values, goals, commitments, and physical safety are all at stake (Foulton, 1982). After the stakes have been figured out, the person then must figure out what they can do. This depends on the availability of resources to keep all that is at stake. When the stakes go up, and the resources go down, more coping responses must be used: there is more stress (Foulton, 1982). Coping responses hopefully change the relationship between the person and the environment by changing the situation or the person's feelings about it.

=== The Functions ===
The functions of coping responses are to reduce stress; they help restore an equilibrium (Foulton, 1982). Here are some examples: defense mechanisms help reduce tension; decision-making responses involves seeking and evaluating information; coping responses with illness involves the reduction of harmful environmental conditions and the maintenance of a positive self-image (Foulton, 1982). There are two groups that these responses can be broken down to. One group is problem-focused and the other is emotional-focused (Foulton, 1982). Problem-focused responses include cognitive strategies and behavioral strategies. A cognitive strategy would be analyzing the situation. Behavioral would be figuring out how to act or which actions to use. These responses are more likely to occur when there is more opportunity for personal control (Foulton, 1982). When there is less opportunity for personal control, then emotion focused responses are used. Emotion-focused responses also include cognitive strategies and behavioral strategies. A cognitive response is thinking positively or even looking at things from a different perspective. A behavioral response would be to seek emotional support (Foulton, 1982). Getting a pet or making new friends could also fit in this category. Both problem and emotional influence each other. For instance, if someone is consumed by an emotion, then they might have to get that under control before they can begin to analyze the situation. Or to control an emotion, someone would reason out what was causing the emotion, thus controlling it.

== Research ==
=== Identity Control and Social Interaction ===
One aspect of new research found with the identity control theory relates to social interaction and identities. According to social psychologist Richard Jenkins, they are vital to each other. The basic principle that Jenkins tries to present is that if social interactions do not exist it is impossible for the main principles of Burke's identity control theory to exist. An individual's identity cannot be approved or disapproved if they do not interact with others. In the reverse direction, if people do not develop their identities enough, it would be impossible for them to interact with those around them fully. Jenkins says that the two go hand in hand and allow the other to function as sociologists have predicted them to. To further understand the relation between social interaction and identity control theory, one must look at the relationships between identity control theory and other sociological ideas. Many other ideas in sociology concern how individuals act in social interactions, which can further the idea of identity control theory. Individuals derive meanings of the majority of the occurrences in their lives through interactions with others. Because of this, it is safe to look at identity control theory and say that as an individual repeats social interactions and receives the same reactions, they can become secure and feel positive emotions regarding their identity. However, if the reactions are inconsistent, the security needed for positive emotions related to their identity is not present. This is because the social interactions confuse the individual instead of allowing them to understand what is occurring around them. Without fully understanding what is going on around them, it would be impossible to fully form and be confident in their identity.

== Connections to other sociological ideas ==
=== Looking Glass Self ===
Looking Glass Self is a sociological term that was introduced by a man named Charles Horton Cooley. This term makes a connection between the reactions of a group and the reactions of an individual. Cooley is saying that a person's opinion of oneself is determined by the opinions of those around them. The group around the person acts as a mirror for them and shows a reflection of how they should view themselves. According to this, if the group thinks an individual is "odd" the individual will view themselves as "odd". This relates to identity control theory in many ways, in fact this idea allowed the identity control theory to be formed. In identity control theory, the individuals feelings arise from the reactions of the group around them. If these two ideas are looked at collectively, an individual would view themselves exactly how the group did and then their feelings would be brought out by whether their current view of self matched their previous view of self. For example, if an individual originally viewed themselves as more of a scholar than an athlete, but the group around them started to view them as an athlete more than an individual their view of themselves would turn to more of an athlete according to looking glass self. But, following identity control theory this individuals input would not match their output which would have the potential to induce negative feelings. This can also be seen in the reverse because if the principle of looking glass self caused the output of an individual to match their input, positive emotions would be brought out. With that being said, the idea of looking glass self has the ability to manipulate the emotional responses of individuals in regards to identity control theory.

=== Mead's mind and self ===
A man named George Herbert Mead furthered the ideas of self that were started by Cooley. Mead used two terms to further the understanding of social interaction. The first of these terms is mind. Mind, in this sense of the word, is being able to understand symbols that are used in everyday social interactions. Mead states that as an individual's interaction with others is repeated their mind becomes more developed. In other words, as people repeatedly interact with those around them, their ability to understand the symbols involved in the interactions more clearly. The more developed an individual's mind is, the easier social interaction will be for them. The second term brought about by Mead is self. In this context, self is the understanding a person creates of how others respond to them. Like the concept of mind, self is brought out by social interaction. By looking at how a group reacts to an individual, Mead says that the individual can not only come to understand their own identity but to also see things from the perspective of another individual. This means that one can imagine what things would be like if they were in another's situation. If this occurs over and over again the individual can begin to generalize what others will expect of the individual and how they will react to them. These relate to identity control theory because understanding the symbols involved in social interaction and being able to predict the outcomes of interaction can help and individual prevent the negative feelings that can be associated with identity control theory. If one can predict how people will react to their identity, they can make changes to their identity that will allow their personal view of their identity to match the view others have of their identity. This will draw positive emotions from the person rather than negative ones, which is what individuals strive for in regards to identity control theory.
