= Superior-subordinate communication =

In an organization, communication occurs between members of different hierarchical positions. Superior-subordinate communication refers to the interactions between organizational leaders and their subordinates and how they work together to achieve personal and organizational goals Satisfactory upward and downward communication is essential for a successful organization because it closes the gap between superior and subordinates by increasing the levels of trust, support, and the frequency of their interactions.

== Downward communication ==
In a workplace environment, orders being given from superiors to subordinates is the most basic form of downward communication. These are usually done via manuals and handbooks, oral communication, and/or written orders. Other examples of downward communication media are information booklets, employee bulletin boards, jobholder reports and meeting forums. Subordinates react most effectively to those matters that they judge to be of greatest personal interest to the boss. Among the various commands, policies, practices, and suggestions that come from above, subordinates select those most in keeping with their perception of their bosses' character, personal motivation, and style and give them priority. Two other forms of downward communication are when a customer gives orders to a supplier and when shareholders instruct management to do certain things.

- Implementation of goals, strategies, and objectives: This type of communication involves transmitting new information that will keep subordinates on the same page and mindset of their superiors, as well as the organization. This helps provide a direction for subordinates to take to help achieve organizational goals and targets. Top-down methods are often used by managers to control the flow of information in order to convey organizational decisions or policies.
- Job instructions and rationale: The first purpose is to provide subordinates with what the organization would like to achieve or reach, while this second purpose is to help give subordinates a successful way to accomplish the tasks. Coordinating both the individual goals and department goals, helps individuals understand their company's aspirations. Procedures and practices: This type of communication includes the most basic conception of downward communication. Superiors communicate the company's prewritten policies, procedures, restrictions, and compensation packages. The overall purpose is to create a sense of expectations and requirements in the subordinate's mind.
- Performance feedback: In order for the procedures and practices to help formulate uniformity along organizational boundaries; progress reports for both individuals/departments and appraisals help communicate subordinates overall performance with the organizations standards. When providing performance feedback superiors must always think of the way in which subordinates may react and how the information can be taken if the review is not completely positive. "Findings suggest the importance of preparing managers for potentially aggressive responses by employees, encouraging them to deliver negative feedback in a manner that minimizes the likelihood of aggression and considering alternative models with regard to appraisal practices."
- Socialization: The last purpose of downward communication is to communicate a sense of belonging to subordinates to promote them to become a part of the organization's culture. This may include motivating subordinates to attend special events that are sponsored by the organization.

In a study conducted by John Anderson and Dale Level, the following were cited to be benefits of effective downward communication:

- Better coordination
- Improved individual performance through the development of intelligent participation
- Improved morale
- Improved consumer relations
- Improved industrial relations.

In order for downward communication to be effective, the superior should remain respectful and concise when giving orders, they should make sure the subordinate clearly understands instructions, and they should give recognition for admirable performance.

== Upward communication ==
Upward communication is the process of transmitting information from the bottom levels of an organization to the top levels. It includes judgments, estimations, propositions, complaints, grievance, appeals, reports, etc. from subordinates to superiors. It is very important because it serves as the response on the success of downward communication. Management learns how well its policies, plans, strategies and objectives are adopted by those working at lower levels of the organization. Upward information flow can be very beneficial for an organization, especially when it is encouraged by the management. When a manager is open to upward communication, they help foster cooperation, gain support, and reduce frustration.

The channel of communication is a vection with upward communication. Certain channels are easily ignored, which can leave subordinates less satisfied with upward communication. A subordinate who is satisfied with his/her upward communication will be less apprehensive about communicating upward than a subordinate who is unsatisfied with his/her upward communication.

== Openness in communication ==
Open communication between superior and subordinate organizational members is an effective way to establish trust within the company. The most effective way to implement open communication is for management to engage in regular face-to-face conversations with employees in order to express their level of care for the work being done. It is important for management to ensure that each employee is being praised for his/ her individual contributions to the organization and to provide ample feedback on things he/ she is doing well and things he/ she can improve upon. This line of open communication makes employees feel more comfortable disclosing any personal issues they are experiencing within the organization.

Employees who have an open communication with their superiors have been found to be more satisfied with their jobs than those who do not have this. Openness in communication requires both openness in message sending and openness in message receiving between superiors and subordinates. Achieving openness in message sending requires complete honesty whether the news is good or bad. Certain types of messages facilitate open communication better. Supervisory messages are preferable for both superiors and subordinates when they are encouraging or reciprocating, rather than responses that are either neutral or negative. Openness in message receiving requires a willingness to listen to the message without jumping to conclusions even when the message is not what you wanted to hear. An open communication relationship differs from a closed by the reactions and types of feedback given, not the message itself. Subordinates in a closed communication relationship with their superior are more likely to respond negatively to the superior's feedback than those who have more open communication with their superior.

== Scanlon Plan ==
It has been proposed that those who perform specific tasks at work on a daily basis are more effective at determining how to improve things in an organization than upper-level management who rarely deals with daily tasks at the company. Everyone in the organization benefits from the Scanlon Plan via profit sharing methods. This plan allows for all employees to be more open-minded about decisions being proposed within an organization by giving them a say in how things are run. [2]

== Relationship maintenance ==
Maintaining the relationship between superior and subordinate will differ greatly, depending on the expectations of the individual parties. Some will settle for nothing less than a close friendship with their superior. Others may be primarily focused on maintaining a professional relationship. Those who may not get along with their superiors may be focused on just maintaining a civil relationship. The unusual relationship between superior and subordinates requires specific maintenance strategies since some typical ones, like avoidance, are unacceptable. There are four common types of relationship maintenance strategies for this variation of relationship. First there are informal interactions, such as joking and non-work related conversations that emphasize creating a friendship. There are also formal interactions, such as politeness and respect for the superior's authority, that help to create a professional superior-subordinate relationship. There are also tactics that allow a subordinate to impressive to the superior, such as a hesitancy to deliver bad news or showing enthusiasm. The final relationship maintenance strategy includes open discussion about the relationship with the superior, including explicitly telling them how they want to be treated in the workplace.

== Feedback ==
Feedback allows for growth in a variety of areas for both superiors and subordinates. Using Feedback as a relational tool allows for a variety of positive outcomes.

For Subordinates:

- Promotion/ Raise
- Skill development
- Improved communication with the boss
- More Motivation to perform well and improve
- Self identification with the organization

For Superior:

- To review selection processes, training, promotion requirements, etc.
- Look at employees potential benefit to the organization
- Influencing positive employee work habits

Effective feedback should be big picture focused, behavioral, specific, and both positive and negative.

== See also ==
- Communication
- Hierarchy
- Job satisfaction
- Management
- Organizational culture
- Feedback
