= Organizational identity =

Organization identity is the fill of the and organizational Theory

Organizational identity is a field of study in organizational theory, that seeks the answer to the question: "who are we as an organization?" The concept was first defined by Albert and Whetten (1985) and later updated and clarified by Whetten (2006),

According to Whetten (2006) the attributes of an organizational identity are central, enduring, and distinctive/distinguishing (CED).

- Central attributes are ones that have changed the history of the company; if these attribute were missing, the history of the organization would have been different.
- Enduring attributes are ones deeply ingrained in the organization, often explicitly considered sacrosanct or embedded in the organizational history.
- Distinguishing attributes are ones used by the organization to separate itself from other similar organizations, but can also set minimum standards and norms for that type of organization.

An attribute of a company must satisfy all three of these requirements in order to be considered an organizational identity.

Organizational identity often attempts to apply sociological and psychological concepts and theories about identity to organizations. As a research topic, organizational identity is related to but clearly separate from organizational culture and organizational image (Hatch and Schultz, 1997). It assumes a larger perspective than work identity (the identity individuals assume when in a work-related context) and organizational behavior (the study of human behavior in organizational settings).

== Public Perceptions of Organizational Identity ==
Organizational identity is formed by top leaders' establishment of the core values and beliefs that guide and drive the organization's behavior. An organization's top leaders must be able to answer the question "Who are we?" as an organization because it affects how they interpret issues, identify threats, craft strategy, communicate about the organization, and resolve conflicts. Public perceptions are often swayed via media attention, while once a member of the organization, an employee may have a completely different perception. Organizations use four identity-building actions when identifying and discussing: storytelling, use of analogies, procuring social evaluations and establishing alliances.

== Managing Organizational Identity ==
According to the work of Albert and Whetten, the task of managing organizational identity is often neglected until an organization reaches a point where it is unavoidable. This may happen in situations when an organization has experienced significant growth, downsizing, or fostered multiple identities that have become irreconcilable. When addressing this question, an organization must undertake the task of identifying which of their aspects truly define themselves and how they should react to those characterizations. This may result in various actions such as setting an agenda to change an identity that has become negative, building on an identity to promote growth or influence in a community, or deciding which aspects to preserve while making budget cuts.

=== Identity Change and Instability ===
Organizational identity is sometimes viewed as a social construction under constant creation through interactions between combinations of internal and external actors. This view sees organizational identity as unstable and changeable rather than enduring. Identity instability is theorized to be beneficial in allowing organizations to adapt to changing operating environments.

Gioia et al. theorize that the basic components of identity endure, but their meanings are reinterpreted over time. Internal actors can influence organizational identity through reinterpretation of or disagreement with the stated or official identity. Powerful members may try to stabilize or officialize organizational identity, resulting in a tension between members with different views of the organization. This tension may be expressed as identity instability.

External factors can also cause change or contribute to identity instability. External perceptions of the organization’s identity may contribute to change or instability when those perceptions conflict with internal views of the organization’s identity. Critical questions about the organization from external actors or critical evaluations of the organization may also contribute to identity change.

There are multitudes of external factors that may influence an organizations identity. For example, a city with oppressive civil rights laws is likely to affect the diversity of an organizations identity within its jurisdiction accordingly and vice versa. Factors such as competition also play a major role in the identity an organization may assume. This is observable in the way that companies often point out distinct characteristic in their products when compared to others that may be almost entirely the same. For example, a burger chain may point out its antibiotic free meat compared to its competitors.

Albert and Whetten theorized that certain parts of an organization's life cycle are important for the formation or reformation of an organization's identity, such as the initial founding of the organization, removal of an important element of the organization, completion of the organization’s main goal, rapid growth or decline, mergers, or splits.

Identity change can be used intentionally to guide organizational change. For example, rather than seeking to answer the question: "who are we as an organization?" an organization may ask "is this who we want to be [as an organization]?" Albert and Whetten identified three main paths organizational identity may take over time:

- Organizations may have a stable identity for the entire life of the organization.
- Organizations may make a permanent change in their identity at some point in the life of the organization.
- Organizations may change their identity and then revert to their original identity.

Changes in an organizations identity often take years to manifest into observable results. This can be attributed to many factors such as deeply rooted cultures in an organization and strong leaders that are resistant to change. While an organization can quickly change its mission statements and marketing techniques in the short term, altering the actual cultural interworking of an organization to correlate with these new goals and images is usually much more of a long-term project. It requires members to buy in to the organizations new goals and desired direction, and for members who are unwilling to conform to either gradually retire or be pushed out of the organization.

=== Managing Multiple identities ===
Much like individuals, organizations can often have multiple identities. This exists when there are more than one conceptualization of what is central, distinctive, and enduring to an organization. Multiple organizational identities may or may not be consciously held by organizational leaders and can be holographic or ideographic. Holographic being an identity that is universally accepted throughout an organization, and ideographic being an identity that is assumed only in one department or sub-group of an organization. The existence of multiple identities in an organization can provide benefits such as increased flexibility when reacting to complex environmental factors and greater appeal to multiple internal stake holders, or become negative when identities conflict and cause inaction or inconsistencies. When addressing the task of managing multiple identities there are two strategic concepts organizational managers should address:

- Identity Plurality- The multiplicity of identities within an organization.
- Identity synergy- How well multiple identities complement each other.

When addressing the plurality of identities in an organization a manager may evaluate the significance and impact each identity has on an organization. If certain identities are not seen as essential, they may be left unattended with intention of essentially letting go of the identity in order to consolidate the ones that are more important in order to create a lower plurality of identities. However, if each identity is seen as essential and necessary for adapting to different environmental factors and stakeholders, managers may emphasize the need to attain a high plurality of identities. When undertaking this task, managers must evaluate the amount of resources and funding they have and what is practical to take on in terms of funding their organizational approaches to obtaining and fostering their identities.

When addressing the synergy of identities in an organization, managers must determine how much interaction between differing identities is desirable and feasible. If it is essential for two identities to cooperate with each other for the well being of an organization, a manager may seek to create a high amount of synergy between the two. If two identities are not seen as essential or productive when interacting with each other, a manager may seek to departmentalize each identity within an organization to limit the amount of synergy between the two in order to reduce conflict.

== Communication Management of Organizational Identity ==
Organizational Identity is to not simply be an organization that provides commodities and services or to take stands on the salient issues of the day, but to do these things with a certain distinctiveness that allows the organization to create and legitimize itself, its particular "profile," and its advantageous position [1]. Any number of companies can offer the same product to the consumer, but it is the objective of communication to illustrate why one specific company should have more sales, growth, and development than the others.

- Communication is both the problem in organizations success and growth, as well as the solution when used effectively and efficiently.
- The ideal image of proper communication the public's perception, what is mainstream and with the times.
- Today image is everything and how you communicate that publicly could lead to potential beneficial or catastrophic events for organizations.

== Ashforth and Mael's approach to Organizational Identity ==
According to Ashforth and Mael, identity is communicated by intrinsic factors such as the formation of identity, its relation to organizational culture and its projected image. However, identity never remains stagnant. It is undergoing constant adjustments, and is negotiated through the narrative told by the company. This phenomenon is known as Narrative Design. Just as narratives build organizational identity, identity itself is the basis of narratives and goes deep into its conception. This is the new way to the self-opinion. These stories communicate the distinctive values and attributes of the organization in a more or less subtle way. It is only when we considered the notion of identity as a narrative that we can observe references to the history and traditions of the organization. This narrative can also transform the internal organizational culture. Depending on the narrative chosen by the organization, the management style of the company will inspire different beliefs and social values. By telling their stories themselves, organizations have the power to control narrative storytelling. It is they who have the power to minimize their present and past mistakes, which have had an impact on the public's perception of the companies image.
