= Michael D. Cohen (academic) =

American academic studying complex systems

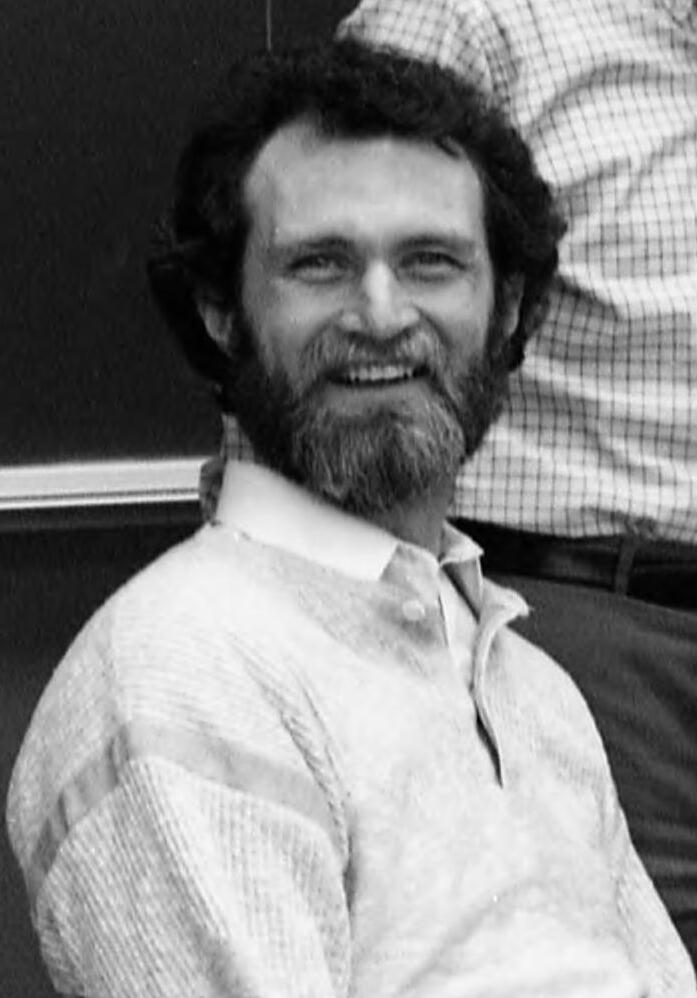
- Born: March 22, 1945; Sheridan, Wyoming, U.S.
- Died: February 2, 2013 (aged 67); Ann Arbor, Michigan, U.S.
- Education: Stanford University (B.A.); University of California, Irvine (Ph.D.)
- Known for: Garbage Can Model
- Scientific career
- Fields: Organization theory
- Workplaces: University of Michigan

Michael Cohen (22 March 1945 – 2 February 2013) was the William D. Hamilton Collegiate Professor of Complex Systems, Information and Public Policy at the University of Michigan.

== Early life and education ==
Cohen received his B.A. in History at Stanford University in 1966, and his Ph.D. in Social Science at the University of California, Irvine in 1972.

== Career ==
Cohen's research centered on learning and adaptation within organizations in response to changing environments. He wrote many articles and books which contributed to theories of organizational decision making. Much of his work employed computer simulation.

=== Garbage can model ===
In 1972, as a NSF-SSRC post-doctoral fellow at Stanford University, Cohen worked with James G. March and visiting professor Johan Olsen from the University of Bergen. Together they published the paper; A Garbage Can Model of Organizational Choice. The paper, since frequently cited, describes the garbage can model, a model which disconnects problems, solutions and decision makers from each other. This was a novel approach compared to traditional decision theory. The paper includes Fortran source code to demonstrate the model.

=== Complexity ===
By 1981, Cohen was working at the University of Michigan.

Cohen's research and publication continued to use computers to model complex organizational behavior. In 1995 he worked with Robert Axtell, Robert Axelrod and Joshua M. Epstein and compared two agent based models; Axelrod's model with Epstein and Axtell's Sugarscape.

In 2000 Cohen and Axelrod went on to publish a book on complexity in organizations: Harnessing Complexity: Organizational Implications of a Scientific Frontier.

=== Other works ===
Cohen's later work included studies in organizational behavior in hospitals, with a view to improving patient care. Much of this work focused on "handoffs"; the transfer of responsibility for patients from one team or department to another.

== Selected publications ==
=== 1970-1980 ===
- Cohen, Michael D.; March, James G.; Olsen, Johan P. (1972). "A Garbage Can Model of Organizational Choice". Administrative Science Quarterly. 17 (1): 1–25. doi:10.2307/2392088. JSTOR 2392088.
- ——; March, James G. (March 1, 1986). Leadership and Ambiguity: The American College Presidency (2 ed.). Boston: Harvard Business School Press. p. 320. ISBN 978-0-87584-131-1. (1st edition, 1974, New York:McGraw-Hill, Chinese edition 2006.)

=== 1980-1990 ===
- Cohen, Michael D. (1982). "The Power of Parallel Thinking" (PDF). Journal of Economic Behavior and Organization. 2 (4): 285–306. doi:10.1016/0167-2681(81)90011-1. hdl:2027.42/24176.
- ——; Axelrod, Robert (March 1984). "Coping with Complexity: The Adaptive Value of Changing Utilities". American Economic Review. 74 (1): 30–42. JSTOR 1803306.
- ——; Bacdayan, Paul (December 1994). "Organizational Routines are Stored as Procedural Memory: Evidence from a Laboratory Study". Organization Science. 5 (4): 554–568. doi:10.1287/orsc.5.4.554.

=== 1990-2000 ===
- Cohen, Michael; Sproull, Lee, eds. (1991). "Organizational Learning: Papers in Honor of (and by) James G. March". Organization Science. 2 (1). Special edition. (Reprinted, with additions and a new introduction, by SAGE Publications, November, 1995.)
- Axtell, Robert; Axelrod, Robert; Epstein, Joshua M.; Cohen, Michael D. (July 1995). "Aligning Simulation Models: A Case Study and Results". Santa Fe Institute Working Paper. 1 (95–07–65): 123–141. doi:10.1007/BF01299065. hdl:2027.42/44707. S2CID 6214474. (Also published in Computational and Mathematical Organization Theory, volume 1, number 2, February, 1996, pp. 123–141.)
- Cohen, Michael D.; Burkhart, Roger; Dosi, Giovanni; Egidi, Massimo; Marengo, Luigi; Warglien, Massimo; Winter, Sidney (November 1995). "Routines and Other Recurring Action Patterns of Organizations: Contemporary Research Issues". Santa Fe Institute Working Paper. 5 (95–11–101): 653–698. doi:10.1093/icc/5.3.653; with comments by Benjamin Coriat (Also published in Industrial and Corporate Change, volume 5, number 3, 1996, pp. 653–698)
- —— (May 1999). "Preface to the Special Issue on Complexity". Organization Science. 10 (3). doi:10.1287/orsc.10.3.373.
- Axelrod, Robert; Cohen, Michael D. (2000). Harnessing Complexity: Organizational Implications of a Scientific Frontier. Free Press. p. 208. ISBN 978-0-684-86717-5. (Paperback; 2001, Basic Books ISBN 0-684-86717-6. Editions in French, 2001, and Japanese, 2003.)

=== 2000-2010 ===
- Cohen, Michael D.; Riolo, Rick L.; Axelrod, Robert (2001). "The Role of Social Structure in the Maintenance of Cooperative Regimes". Rationality and Society. 13 (1): 5–32. doi:10.1177/104346301013001001. S2CID 9034214.
- Riolo, Rick L.; Cohen, Michael; Axelrod, Robert (22 Nov 2001). "Evolution of Cooperation without Reciprocity". Nature. 414 (6862): 441–443. Bibcode:2001Natur.414..441R. doi:10.1038/35106555. hdl:2027.42/62686. PMID 11719803. S2CID 4317386.
- ——; Dosi, Giovanni; Levinthal, Daniel; et al., eds. (Fall 2003). "Editor's Introduction". Industrial and Corporate Change.
- ——; Riolo, Rick L.; Axelrod, Robert (2004). ""Must there be human genes specific to prosocial behavior?" a response to Henrich, Joseph, "Cultural Group Selection…"". Journal of Economic Behavior and Organization. 53: 49–51. doi:10.1016/S0167-2681(03)00102-1.
- ——; Riolo, Rick L.; Axelrod, Robert (2005). "Tags, Interaction Patterns and the Evolution of Cooperation". In Mitchell, M.; Booker, L.; Forrest, S.; et al. (eds.). Perspectives on Adaptation, Evolution and Complex Adaptive Systems. Oxford University Press.
- —— (2006). "What's Different is Routine". Industrial and Corporate Change. 15 (2): 387–390. doi:10.1093/icc/dtl001. Archived from the original on 2009-11-25. (Comments on 'Toward a Neo-Schumpeterian Theory of the Firm' by Sidney Winter.)
- ——; Wesorick D.W.; Fleming A.; Hsu R.; Kim C.; Lee F.; Lim S.; Mangrulkar R.; Parekh V.; Thompson M.; Yakel E.; Kramer M. (May 2006). Standardized Observations of Cross-Cover Events in Hospitalized Patients: What goes "bump" in the night? (Poster). Washington D.C.: Society of Hospital Medicine National Conference.
- —— (May–June 2007). "Administrative Behavior: laying the foundations for Cyert and March". Organization Science. 18 (3): 503–506. doi:10.1287/orsc.1070.0275.
- —— (2007). "Beyond Boundedly Rational Individuals: Remarks on "Behavioral Organizational Economics". In Diamond, Peter; Vartiainen, Hannu (eds.). Behavioral Economics and Its Applications: Proceedings of the Yrjö Jahnsson Foundation 50th Anniversary Conference. Princeton New Jersey: Princeton University Press.
- ——; Birnholtz, Jeremy P.; Hoch, Susannah (2007). "Organizational Character: on the regeneration of Camp Poplar Grove". Organization Science. 18 (2): 315–332. doi:10.1287/orsc.1070.0248.
- ——; March, James G.; Olsen, Johan P. (Aug 28, 2007). "The Garbage Can Model". In Clegg, Stewart; Bailey, James R. (eds.). International Encyclopedia of Organization Studies. Thousand Oaks, CA: SAGE Publications. ISBN 978-1-4129-1515-1.
- —— (2007). "Reading Dewey: reflections on the study of routine". Organization Studies. 28 (5): 773–786. doi:10.1177/0170840606077620. S2CID 145760827.
- —— (February 22, 2008). "Learning with Regret". Science. 319 (1052): 1052–1053. doi:10.1126/science.1155477. PMID 18292330. S2CID 32865865.
- ——; Hilligoss, P. Brian (April 8, 2010). "The published literature on handoffs in hospitals: deficiencies identified in an extensive review". Quality & Safety in Health Care. 19 (6): 493–497. doi:10.1136/qshc.2009.033480. PMID 20378628. S2CID 7020545.
