= Martha S. Feldman =

American organization theorist

- Born: March 31, 1953 (age 73); Oak Ridge, Tennessee, U.S.
- Known for: Organizational routines Inclusive public management qualitative research

Academic background
- Education: University of Washington; Stanford University
- Doctoral advisor: James G. March

Academic work
- Institutions: University of Michigan; University of California, Irvine

Martha Sue Feldman (born March 31, 1953) is an American organization theorist best known for her work on organizational routines and, particularly, routine dynamics. Other areas of research she has contributed to include inclusive management and qualitative research methods. Feldman is the Johnson Chair for Civic Governance and Public Management in the School of Social Ecology at the University of California, Irvine She has published four books as well as numerous book chapters and journal articles.

== Research fields ==
=== Inclusive management ===
Feldman's research on inclusive management focuses on strengthening community and democratic participation. She has written about inclusive management with co-authors Anne Khademian and Kathryn Quick (University of Minnesota). Inclusive Management is a pattern of practices by public managers that facilitate the inclusion of public employees, experts, the public, and politicians in collaboratively addressing public problems or concerns of public interest.

== Selected bibliography ==
=== Organizational routines as practices ===
- Dynamics of organizational routines: A generative model. 2012. Pentland, Brian, Martha S. Feldman, Markus Becker and Peng Lui. Journal of Management Studies. 49(8):1484-1508
- Toward a theory of coordinating: Creating coordinating mechanisms in practice. 2012. Paula A. Jarzabkowski, Jane K. Lê and Martha S. Feldman. Organization Science; 23(4) 907-927.
- Practicing theory and theorizing practice. 2011. Martha S. Feldman and Wanda J. Orlikowski. Organization Science, 22 (5): 1240-1253.
- Routines as a source of change in organizational schemata: The role of trial-and-error learning. 2011. Claus Rerup and Martha S. Feldman. Academy of Management Journal. Vol. 54, No. 3, 577–610.
- Narrative networks: Patterns of technology and organization. 2007. Brian T. Pentland and Martha S. Feldman. Organization Science, 18(5): 781-795.
- Resources in emerging structures and processes of change. 2004. Martha S. Feldman. Organization Science, 15(3): 295-309.
- Reconceptualizing organizational routines as a source of flexibility and change. 2003. Martha S. Feldman and Brian T. Pentland. Administrative Science Quarterly, 48: 94-118.
- Organizational routines as a source of continuous change. 2000. Martha S. Feldman. Organization Science, 11(6): 611-629.

=== Inclusive management ===
- Boundaries as Junctures: Collaborative Boundary Work for Building Efficient Resilience. 2014. Kathryn S. Quick and Martha S. Feldman. Journal of Public Administration Research and Theory 24(3): 651-671.
- Distinguishing participation and inclusion. 2011. Kathryn S. Quick and Martha S. Feldman. Journal of Planning Education and Research 31(3): 271-290. (Received the ACSP's 2012 Chester Rapkin Best Paper Award.)
- Generating resources and energizing frameworks through inclusive public management. 2009. Martha S. Feldman and Kathryn S. Quick. International Public Management Journal, Vol. 12, No. 9:137-171.
- The role of the public manager in inclusion. 2007. Martha S. Feldman and Anne M. Khademian. Governance, 20(2): 305-324.
- Ways of knowing and inclusive management practices. 2006. Martha S. Feldman, Anne M. Khademian, Helen Ingram, Anne S. Schneider. Public Administration Review, 66(6) (Special Issue on Collaborative Public Management): 89-99.
- To manage is to govern. 2002. Martha S. Feldman and Anne M. Khademian. Public Administration Review, 62(5): 541-555.

=== Qualitative methods ===
- Analyzing the implicit in stories. 2011. Martha S. Feldman and Julka Almquist. In Varieties of Narrative Analysis. J. Holstein and J. Gubrium (Eds.). Thousand Oaks, CA: SAGE Publishing.
- Making doubt generative: Rethinking the role of doubt in the research process. 2008. Karen Locke, Karen Golden-Biddle and Martha S. Feldman. Organization Science. Vol. 19, No. 6: pp. 907–918
- Making sense of stories: A rhetorical approach to narrative analysis. 2004. Martha S. Feldman, Kaj Sköldberg, Ruth Nicole Brown and Debra Horner. Journal of Public Administration Research and Theory, 14(2): 147-170.
- Gaining access: A practical and theoretical guide for qualitative researchers; by Martha S. Feldman, Jeannine Bell and Michele Berger and associates; Walnut Creek, CA: Altamira Press; 2003.
- Strategies for interpreting qualitative data; by Martha S. Feldman; Newbury Park, CA; SAGE; 1995.

== See also ==
- Pierre Bourdieu
- Barbara Czarniawska
- Anthony Giddens
- Bruno Latour
- Wanda Orlikowski
- Ethnography
- Inclusive Management
- Organizational routines
- Practice (social theory)
