= Policy instrument constituencies =

Concept in political science

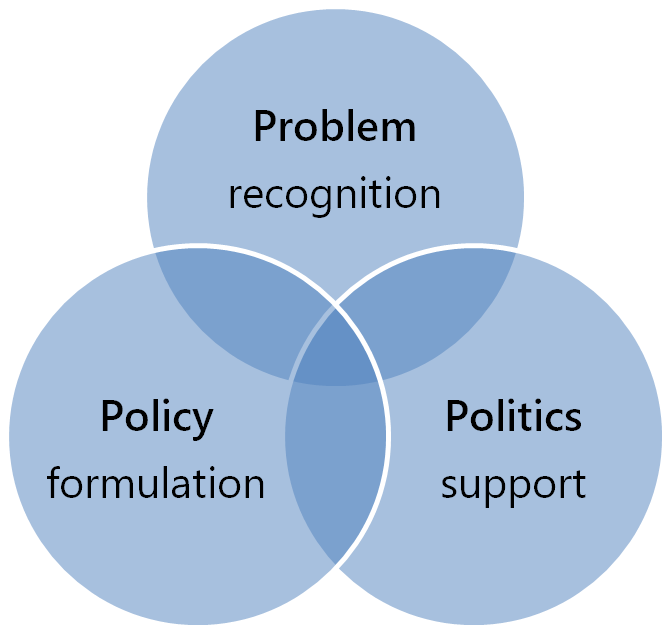
The multiple streams framework explains that policy change happens when problem recognition, policy formulation and political support align.

A policy instrument constituency is a theoretical concept in political science and describes a network of actors (individuals and organizations) focused on developing, promoting, and maintaining a specific policy instrument (e.g., regulations, taxes, subsidies). Instrument constituencies have been identified as the key drivers of the "policy stream" in the multiple streams framework. By actively promoting the benefits and effectiveness of the instruments they promote, instrument constituencies can significantly influence the policy agenda. This influence can lead to the adoption of an instrument even when other tools might be more effective for a given challenge. Likewise, the influence of instrument constituency can lead to problem chasing, which is the situation in which the coupling of an instrument to a policy problem is driven by the former rather than the latter. On the other hand, encouraging the growth of instrument constituencies can also be beneficial, e.g. for fostering climate-friendly transitions.

== Development of the concept ==
The concept first originated in the works of Jan-Peter Voß and Arno Simons, as a critique of studying policy instrumentation mostly from the perspective of policy choice. The latter perspective tended to take the availability of policy instruments for granted, or to treat them as emerging from experiential learning. In contrast, Voß and Simons emphasized the "supply side" of policy instrumentation, by showing that a particular tool, emissions trading, has been developed in a more or less coordinated way by a network of environmental economists, consultants, think tanks, and economic actors being attracted by the promise of emerging markets for tradable permits. Voß, Simons and colleagues also applied the concept to analyzing the development of other instruments, including experimental sustainability management, biodiversity offsets, citizen juries, and evidence-based policy.

Policy scholars around the world picked up the notion of instrument constituencies and developed it further. For example, Daniel Béland and Michael Howlett fleshed out the notion of instruments "chasing problems" in virtue of their constituencies, a point already made in passing by Voß and Simons in their original publication. Another development of the concept was to compare instrument constituencies to other collective policy actors. Ishani Mukherjee and Howlett argued that instrument constituencies, together with epistemic communities and advocacy coalitions can be thought of as three driving actor groups in John W. Kingdon's famous multiple streams framework. Another conceptual development was the application of the concept to studying meta policy instruments by Simons and Alexander Schniedermann who analyzed the emergence of evidence-based policy as driven by an transnational constituency.

== Formation ==
Instrument constituencies form and are held together by functional as well as structural promises. The former include expectations about the effectiveness or superiority of an instrument, which are actively nurtured by the constituency. Structural promises, on the other hand, comprise expectations regarding roles, positions, and career opportunities that become necessary during the process of developing, implementing or sustaining the operation of an instrument. Constituencies form around instruments when expectations and promises attract researchers, consultants, government staffers or other actors in support of the instrument. The more such actors discover their shared interest in advocating the instrument the more the constituency becomes a strategic collective policy actor.

== In the multiple streams framework ==
The multiple streams framework is a prominent approach in the political science, which emphasizes the unpredictable and complex nature of policy development. According to this framework, policy making is driven by the interaction of three largely independent streams:

- a problem stream in which problems are identified and defined,
- a policy stream in which potential policy solutions are developed, and
- a politics stream that concerns the political climate and public opinion surrounding an issue.

After the introduction of the instrument constituency framework by Voß and Simons, the multiple streams framework has been specified in terms of the collective actors driving each of the three streams. Many scholars now share the view that the solutions stream is mainly driven by instrument constituencies, while the problem and politics streams are driven by epistemic communities and advocacy coalitions respectively.
