= Multiple streams framework =

Approach for analyzing public policymaking processes

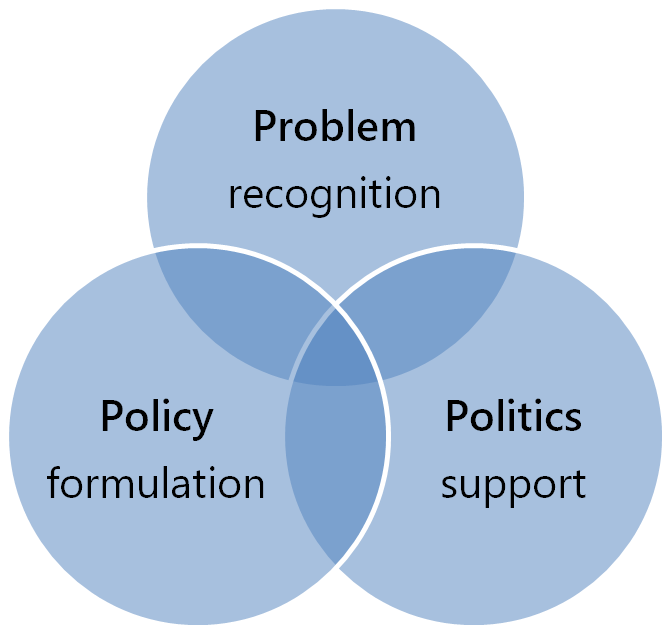
The multiple streams framework explains that policy change happens when problem recognition, policy formulation and political support align.

The multiple streams framework (MSF) is a prominent approach for analyzing public policymaking processes. It emphasizes the unpredictable and complex nature of policy development, proposing that three distinct, yet interconnected streams influence the process:

- Problem stream: This stream focuses on identifying and defining issues as problems. It involves actors like media, policy communities, and the public bringing attention to situations requiring policy intervention. Debates arise on how to frame and define the problem, influenced by diverse perspectives and values.
- Policy stream: This stream deals with the development and refinement of potential policy solutions. Policymakers, analysts, and experts propose solutions, analyzing their technical feasibility, effectiveness, and resource needs. They consider existing policies, research findings, and potential consequences of proposed solutions.
- Politics stream: This stream concerns the political feasibility, political climate and public opinion surrounding an issue. It incorporates factors like upcoming elections, public sentiment, and the power dynamics between political actors. Policymakers consider their own political positions, potential public support or opposition, and potential impacts on their political standing.

The MSF highlights that policy change occurs when elements from each stream converge in a policy window.

== History and development ==
The MSF was first proposed by John W. Kingdon to describe the agenda setting stage of the policy making process. In developing his framework Kingdon took inspiration from the garbage can model of organizational choice, which views organizations as anarchical processes resulting from the interaction of four streams: 1) choices, 2) problems, 3) solutions, and 4) energy from participants. Kingdon adapted this general idea to understand agenda setting in the federal government. While his MSF only includes three streams (problems, policies, politics), the general logic is similar: Separate streams run through the organization (of government), each with a life of its own. Solutions are developed whether or not they respond to a problem. Likewise sudden changes can occur in the political landscape, potentially leaving the policy community and existing problems unaddressed. According to Kingdon, the key to understanding agenda and policy change is the coupling of streams, again an idea taken from the garbage can model. At critical times, a problem is recognized, a solution is available, and the political climate allows for action. Kingdon called this situation a "policy window", which is open only for a short time. Only then, the three stream can be coupled in just the right way to yield a significant agenda change. The agents that achieve such coupling have been called policy entrepreneurs by Kingdon.

Whereas Kingdon himself did little to encourage others to apply the MSF in different settings, the framework has since been widely adopted and refined by other policy scholars. It was taken up in the field of comparative policy analysis, generalized to policy making systems different from the United States, and combined with the concept of the policy cycle, allowing it to be used to study not only agenda setting but all stages of the policy process, including policy formulation, decision-making, implementation, and evaluation. In terms of actors and agency, Kingdon mainly focused on the role of the policy entrepreneur, raising questions about the role of other actors, especially collective policy actors. As a consequence, leading scholars now describe the different streams in the multiple-streams framework as being populated by distinct collective actors, most notably epistemic communities in the problem stream, policy instrument constituencies in the policy stream, and advocacy coalitions in the politics stream.

== See also ==
- Garbage can model
- Policy
- Political feasibility analysis
- Political science
