= Duran Bell =

American academic

Duran Bell, Jr.
- Born: April 21, 1936 (age 90)
- Spouse: Huiqin Zhao

Academic background
- Education: University of California, Berkeley

Academic work
- Discipline: Social economics
- Institutions: University of California, Irvine
- Notable ideas: Models of social processes

Duran Bell, Jr. (born April 21, 1936) is Professor Emeritus of Economics at the University of California, Irvine. He was formerly a professor there in two departments, Economics and Anthropology.

== Education and early career ==
Bell received his B.A. in economics in 1960 and his Ph.D. in agricultural economics in 1965, both from the University of California, Berkeley. He then joined the faculty in the Economics department at the University of California, Irvine in 1965.

== Research ==
Bell was a research associate with the Brookings Institution from 1971 to 1973 and a senior economist with the RAND Corporation from 1973 to 1976. Bell's main research focus was on non-market exchange processes, and eventually he found ethnography the most effective theoretical grounding for his work. He later joined the Department of Anthropology at the University of California, Irvine in 1965.

Bell is a founding member of the Social Dynamics and Complexity Group in the Institute for Mathematical Behavioral Sciences at U/C Irvine.

== Personal life ==
Professor Bell's father, Duran Sr, became a fulltime plowboy at the age of seven and received little education. He escaped the share cropping economy of rural Arkansas at the age of 15 and became a pipe fitter in Little Rock, where he met his wife, Juanita Jones. Having become a cement mason during WWII, he was able to enlist his fifteen-year-old son, Duran Jr, as an apprentice. By the time that Duran Jr graduated from high school, he had learned the skills of a "journeyman" cement mason; and by working during the summer months, he was able later to maintain himself as a self-supporting, full-time, student at the University of California, Berkeley, enrolling in 1954. Bell's mother had been raised in the city of Little Rock and possessed a high school education. Financial issues prevented her from attending college; however, she considered herself to merit the middle class status of a school teacher and rejected the very backward ghetto in North Richmond, CA, to which they moved during the war. Consequently, she conveyed to her son a belief in the incompatibility of their residence with their much higher social potential. Bell credits his mother for his escape from the debilitating mentality of their ghetto-environment.

Early in his Berkeley life, Bell became involved with the Young Socialist League, a splinter group relative to more established Trotskyist organizations. This involvement was clearly a distraction from his academic responsibilities, yet it was an essential palliative, given the racist ideologies of the social sciences. After considerable personal turmoil and two wasted years, Bell discovered economic theory, a field whose mathematical, deductive, character was appealing. Economics also did not exude an obvious racism.

During his senior year, he was noticed by an agricultural economist from the Davis campus, who was teaching a course on Industrial Organization. This professor recommended Bell to Berkeley's Department of Agricultural Economics, which immediately offered Bell a "full ride" research assistantship—a welcomed escape from the inadequacy of summertime construction work. Bell performed well in this Department and produced a doctoral dissertation that was awarded two national awards in agricultural economics, in 1964. However, since his race was indicated in the Department's announcement of new graduates, Bell received no interviews from universities or from the Department of Agriculture. Since the Department's graduates were heavily recruited by departments of agricultural economics, Bell's situation was an embarrassment. However, after a year of failure, Bell was brought to the attention of Prof. James G. March, who was to become the Dean of Social Sciences for the new Irvine campus of the University.

Bell received his promotion to Associate Professor in 1970, on the basis of the publication of his dissertation and another paper. However, he took leave of the Irvine campus to become a research associated with the Brookings Institution in Washington DC, where he worked for two years, publishing papers on issues related to Black workers. Then, he returned to Irvine on a half-time basis and combined it with a position at the Rand Corporation in Santa Monica, where most of his work dealt with the economics of aging. However, upon returning to full-time work at the University in 1975, he had a dispute with the Dean, which was demoralizing, leading to a five-year hiatus in research. It was only in the early 1980s that Bell returned to energetic research efforts, having become interested in economic anthropology. Most of the work that he produced between 1990 and 2008 can be found on his Personal Website. However, he has continued to publish after that date, with a capstone, major book which he hopes to be published in 2021: Corrupted Sciences: Ethnocentrism and racism in the study of prehistoric migrations.

Between 2001 and 2005, Bell did ethnographic research in a Chinese village, under the stewardship of Zhao xudong, who had produced his dissertation with research in this village. Hence, upon his retirement, Bell decided to return to Beijing and become associated with institutions there. However, after two years, and his marriage to Zhao huiqin (no relationship), he returned California, but continues to travel frequently to China. In recent years, he has been teaching a summer course at the prestigious Renmin University in Beijing, with the blessings of his friend, Zhao xudong, who is now Chair of Anthropology.

Professors Bell's family life has been somewhat tumultuous. He married Alice Ida Brunner, in 1960, as he begin graduate school, but divorced after one and one-half years. Alice completed her Ph.D. in psychology at Berkeley and became a professional counselor. He then married Ingeborg Breitner Powell in 1965 and she joined him as a faculty member at Irvine with a Ph.D. in Sociology from Berkeley. This marriage lasted five years. Then, he met Stephanie Ellman in 1972 and she jointed him when he returned to California in 1973. This marriage lasted until 2004 and they have two children: Nathan Ellman-Bell, a talented percussionist, and Catherine Ellman-Bell.
