= Policy entrepreneur =

Self-interested policy influencer

Policy entrepreneurs are individuals who exploit opportunities to influence policy outcomes so as to promote their own goals, without having the resources necessary to achieve this alone. They are not satisfied with merely promoting their self-interests within institutions that others have established; rather, they try to create new horizons of opportunity through innovative ideas and strategies. These persistent individuals employ innovative ideas and nontraditional strategies to promote desired policy outcomes. Whether from the private, public or third sector, one of their defining characteristics is a willingness to invest their own resources – time, energy, reputation and sometimes money – in hope of a future return. While policy entrepreneurs may try to block changes proposed by others, entrepreneurial activities usually seek to change the status quo rather than preserve it. It should be stressed, however, that although the literature has focused mainly on entrepreneurs who have led successful changes in policy, not all policy entrepreneurship ends in success. Finally, policy entrepreneurship is but one form of political participation. It is a process that involves individuals who are willing to take risks, identify policy problems and solutions, and use their political skills and timing to achieve a specified outcome". Most accounts and case studies address these individuals in a national context but the emergence of transnational policy entrepreneurs is increasingly apparent.

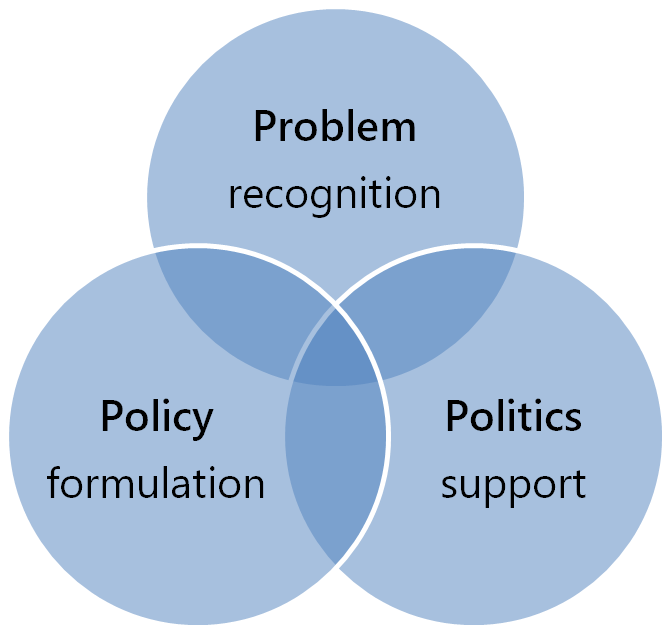
The multiple streams framework explains that policy change happens when problem recognition, policy formulation and political support align.

The term was first coined by American political scientist John W. Kingdon in his influential work Agendas, Alternatives and Public Policies published in 1984. Kingdon laid the foundation for the multiple streams framework (MSF), which outlines that the policy process can be situated into problems, policy and politics.The multiple streams framework is a powerful tool to understand policy making and agenda setting. It was first created to analyze and understand agenda setting in the United States. Policy entrepreneurs are the most important actors in the multiple streams framework, as they develop policy alternatives and couple them with problems to present solutions to policy makers at the right time. Political entrepreneurs are most active in the policy stream, creating solutions to potential problems and bringing them forth to the agenda setting process. He himself describes them as "advocates who are willing to invest their resources – time, energy, reputation, money – to promote a position in return for anticipated future gain in the form of material, purposive or solidary benefits". Policy entrepreneurs use innovative ideas and non-traditional strategies to influence society, create opportunities, and promote desired policy outcomes. Policy entrepreneurship usually happens over three phases. It starts with a demand in the political landscape for some form of innovation involving a public good. Secondly, an innovative policy instrument is proposed to supply that demand. Lastly, strategies are used such as team building, problem definition, and leadership by example to make certain that the innovation is placed on the agenda. Unlike a public intellect who strives to assert themselves into many different topics and be publicly vocal, a policy entrepreneur will focus on specific topics and possibly work behind the scenes with state and political elite.

== Origin ==
The term entrepreneur is derived from the French word entreprendre, i.e. to undertake. The French economist Jean-Baptiste Say first coined the term in 1803 and defined an entrepreneur as an individual who "shifts economic resources out of an area of lower and into an area of higher productivity and greater yield". Many decades later, scholars gradually have expanded the use of the idea of entrepreneurship and adapted the concept from business to the public sector. John Kingdon (1984) was one of the earliest scholars to apply the term entrepreneurs to the public sector; he first coined the term "policy entrepreneur" in his work Agendas, Alternatives and Public Policies. This new term has been addressed in other works but has not been systematically used by other political scientists in theories of policy change.

== In the multiple streams framework ==
According to Kingdon, policy entrepreneurs are key actors behind the coupling of streams in the multiple streams framework (MSF). The MSF sees that policies can be created by joining together problems, policies and politics, all of which are seen as decision aspects in a policy process. Government agendas are created when problems are recognized that have viable solutions that will be politically correct to make at the time of decision making. Kingdon recognizes when these three aspects join together using the term "policy window". When a policy window is recognized and open, there is a potential for policy making to happen. Policy entrepreneurs function at this time as the action takers who take advantage of these windows while they are open. The multiple-streams framework is considered to provide the best conceptual insight in terms of the presence and influence of policy entrepreneurs and their role in emergence of policy windows by using the three 'streams' to explain the gap between a problem getting attention and the adoption of an impactful solution.

== Idea to implementation ==
'Bridging research and policy' or effective use of evidence ins policy development, is one key element to policy entrepreneurship. In the multiple-streams frameworks, policy entrepreneurs do most of their work in the policy stream working on agenda setting ideas. The role of a policy entrepreneur is to first identify demand for innovation in the political landscape when a recognizable policy window is open. When this window is open, a policy entrepreneur has a limited amount of time to undergo the initial launch of proposing policy recommendations to supply the demand by utilizing their personal, network and institutional resources to take action on joining streams together on their idea through the policy stages. This is done by addressing issues and problems and coming up with solutions to them by creating policy alternatives into a product that they can present as a persuasive agenda that policy-makers should examine. They will implement persuasive strategies and techniques on the policy-makers to coerce their innovation onto the agenda. A successful policy entrepreneur will manage to get their issues onto a political agenda and potentially pass and influence a form of legislation that relates to their personal benefit. However, not every attempt will be successful. If unsuccessful, a policy entrepreneur may hold onto their agenda for a later time or even apply it to a different issue that they deem may work.

== Characteristics ==
These individuals have a credential that allows their opinions to be heard over others. This could be having expert knowledge on a topic or holding an important position of power in a corporation or special interest group that allows them to make decisions. A policy entrepreneur usually will have a large network of people with political influence that they utilize when pushing their idea forward. Persistence is essential for a policy entrepreneur to be successful. Many hours must be dedicated to their idea by giving speeches and talks, writing papers and speaking in front of government committees if they are to have success.

Policy entrepreneurs are crucial actors in policy making, Kingdon himself explained that policy entrepreneurs are "advocates who are willing to invest their resources – time, energy, reputation, money – to promote a position in return for anticipated future gain in the form of material, purposive or solidary benefits". Other political scientists have taken Kingdon's definition and expanded further. Michael Mintrom applied a public policy perspective to the term stating, “they are individuals who through their creativity, strategy, networking, and persuasive argumentation are able to bring new policy ideas into the open and promote policy change". Years later, using a constructivist perspective, Michael Mazarr added to this saying, "policy entrepreneurs can be seen as the human embodiment of the social construction of policy. Advocates determined, for one reason or another, to fight inertia, the bureaucracy, opposing interests, and anything else in their way to get the idea through the window [of opportunity] and into law or policy".

== Reviews and criticisms ==
Reviews of Agendas, Alternatives, and Public Policy display mixed opinions on the approaches and concepts created by Kingdon. Roger Cobb, former professor of political science at Brown University writes in an article for the Journal of Health Politics, Policy and Law that Kingdon's garbage can model approach is a completely random decision-making tool that lacks content. Cobb states that the greatest contribution of the garbage can model is the creation of new terms like policy entrepreneur that help give the sense of focus on policy problems but then argues that Kingdon himself may not fully believe in what he has created. He criticizes that Kingdon makes a legitimate arguments for structure by writing about "predictable policy windows" that are attributable to different political cycles but makes rations that would contradict his whole argument.

Evelyn Brodkin, associate professor at Crown Family School of Social Work, Policy, and Practice, writes in Political Science Quarterly that Kingdon's book provides a good analysis of how policy participants see their own role in influencing others, raising issue awareness and framing these issues for debate. She finds that his findings are beneficial for pursuing more empirical investigation and debate on different models of the agenda-setting process. In her criticism, Brodkin argues that the book fails to challenge criticisms of the pluralist theory that focus on discrepancies that illustrate how certain groups and issues systematically are excluded from the political process in which Kingdon's work is modelled on.

The frequent use of Kingdon's agenda-setting framework in policy analysis is especially interesting because the book focuses solely on the United States. It can be argued that a framework developed exclusively on the basis of the examination of a single nation should not be able to generate useful insight in comparative research across the globe. Still, the MSF has been used in a large number of studies of subnational politics such as the European Union, the United Nations, and countries beyond the US. Cairney and Zahariadis explain that this is because Kingdon's MSF possesses a language that is flexible enough to be relevant on a wide range of policy making processes. Its insights are universal enough to apply in most political systems.

Harald Sætren, professor at University of Bergen Department of Administration and Organization Theory, writes in Policy Sciences that one of the problems with the multiple-streams framework is that differing methods of finding issues and solutions potentially can affect how successful a policy entrepreneur can be in coupling policy streams.

== Policy entrepreneurs ==
John Kingdon's research consisted of case studies on 23 different people he deemed to be policy entrepreneurs.

Name	Position	Policy Accomplishments
Paul Ellwood	Head of Interstudy	Promoted the HMO legislation
Abe Bergman	Physician	Persuaded Senator Warren Magnuson on the positives of having a Health Service Corps, which funded research on sudden infant death syndrome. Helped legislate the regulation of flammable children's sleepwear.
Ralph Nader	Consumer Advocate	Began successful career pushing ideas about auto safety issues.
Pete Domenici	Senator	Responsible for pushing a waterway user charge.
Alfred Kahn	Economist, Head of Civil Aeronautics Board in the Carter Administration	Used political influence to implement legislation and regulation safety for airlines

Isambard Kingdom Brunel is a mechanical engineer that engaged in the debate about whether paddle wheels or screw propellers were more powerful for moving boats. He tested this by building one of each and using them in a channel to see which would tug the hardest. The point of his story is that he was engaged on the ground and not just researching in a lab. Policy entrepreneurs need to be practically involved in testing their theories if they want their recommendations to be considered.

In a study done by Mark Beeson and Diane Stone, Ross Garnaut was examined in a role of a policy entrepreneur. Garnaut was a highly decorated scholar, recognized economist who was also an ambassador to China and a prime ministerial advisor in Australia. In his role as advisor to Prime Minister Hawke, he wrote to him about problems with fixed exchange rates and instituting labour-market reform. The government went on to implement a radical program of economic liberalisation that included addressing some of the issues Garnaut consulted on.

Renaissance Philanthropy identifies policy entrepreneurs. The organization names Jennifer Erickson and Greg Segal as policy entrepreneurs for their advocacy to overhaul a monopoly contract held by the United Network for Organ Sharing (UNOS) over the management of the Organ Procurement and Transplantation Network (OPTN). Their advocacy resulted in the passage of the Securing the U.S. Organ Procurement and Transplantation Network Act in 2023. Renaissance Philanthropy also names Marina Nitze, who, as Chief Technologist of the U.S. Department of Veterans Affairs, introduced a user-friendly platform for veterans to track their benefits.

== Recognition ==
The Federation of American Scientists presented its inaugural Policy Entrepreneurship Award in 2023 to Alexa White, co-founder of the AYA Research Institute. The organization also operates multiple fellowships for policy entrepreneurs.

Renaissance Philanthropy runs the Policy Entrepreneurs Network, a community of learning and practice for 170+ policy entrepreneurs.

== See also ==
- Agenda-setting theory
- Lobbyist
- Political entrepreneur
- Politician
- Social entrepreneur
