= Organization science =

Organization science may refer to:

- Organizational studies, a scientific field
- Organization Science (journal)
