= Daniel A. Levinthal =

American organizational theorist and management scholar

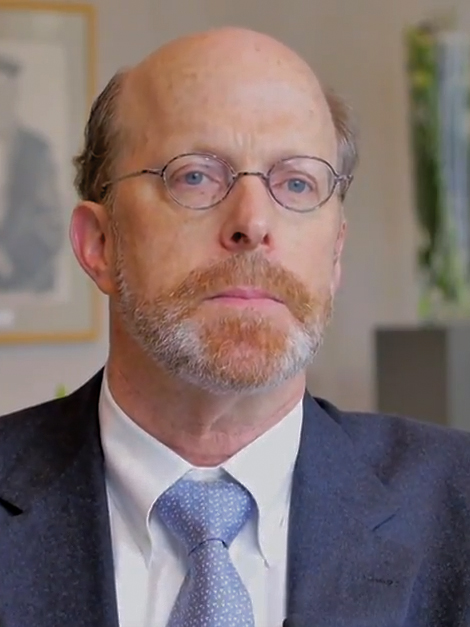
- Dan Levinthal (2014)
- Born: 1957 (age 68–69)
- Education: Stanford University
- Scientific career
- Fields: strategy, management, organization theory
- Workplaces: Carnegie Mellon University; The Wharton School at the University of Pennsylvania
- Doctoral advisor: James G. March

Daniel A. Levinthal (born in 1957) is a Reginald H. Jones Professor of Corporate Strategy at the Wharton School of the University of Pennsylvania. Levinthal is considered to be one of the most prominent management scholars. His pioneering work on organizational learning, complex systems, and innovation as search process have advanced understanding of organizational and industry evolution and received numerous international awards. His papers remain some of the highest cited papers in management and social sciences in general.

== Early life and education ==
Levinthal grew up in the Silicon Valley where his father, Elliott Levinthal, was on the faculty of the Stanford University. Levinthal received his B.A in Economics from Harvard University in 1979. He later received his Ph.D. in Economics, Business, and Public Policy in 1985 from the Graduate School of Business at the Stanford University. Levinthal's advisor during the doctoral studies at Stanford was James G. March.

== Career ==
Levinthal started his professional career in 1983 as, first, an Instructor of Economics and Industrial Administration and from 1985 as Assistant Professor at the Graduate School of Industrial Administration at the Carnegie Mellon University. In 1989 he moved to an Associate Professor position at the Wharton School of the University of Pennsylvania, where he became a full Professor in 1998.

Daniel Levinthal received an honorary doctorate from the following universities:

- University of Southern Denmark (Odense), 2010
- Tilburg University (Holland), 2014
- Warwick University (United Kingdom), 2017
- London Business School (United Kingdom), 2018

Levinthal is a fellow of the Strategic Management Society (since 2011) and the Academy of Management (since 2010). Both titles are awarded to a scholar who have made significant contributions to the theory and practice of management.

== Contributions ==
Levinthal's research centers on the topics of industry evolution, organizational learning, and technological revolution.

In 2010 Levinthal received a Distinguished Scholar Award granted by the Organizational and Management Theory Division of the Academy of Management and in 2015 the Irwin Award as Distinguished Educator by the Business Policy Division of the Academy of Management.

His paper with James G. March 1993 was the Winner of the 2002 Strategic Management Society Best Paper Prize for work with the most significant impact over the prior 10 years and his paper with Wesley Cohen on innovation and learning (1989) was selected by The Economic Journal as one of the top 13 most influential articles. A related paper with Wesley Cohen on absorptive capacity (1990) remains one of the highest cited papers in the field of management. As of July 27, 2017, the Google Scholar showed 69,195 citations of Levinthal's work, with Cohen and Levinthal (1989 and 1990), Levinthal and March (1981 and 1993), Levinthal (1997), Gavetti and Levinthal (2000) each having more than one thousand citations.

Since 2014 Levinthal serves as Editor-in-Chief of the Strategy Science journal. He also served as Editor-in-chief of Organization Science between 2010 and 2013 and as an Editor of Industrial and Corporate Change from 2010 to 2015.
