= Inclusive management =

Pattern of practices by public managers

Inclusive management is a pattern of practices by public managers that facilitate the inclusion of public employees, experts, the public, and politicians in collaboratively addressing public problems or concerns of public interest.

In the inclusive management model, managers focus on building the capacity of the public to participate in the policy process. One way this capacity is built is through the structuring and maintenance of relationships by managers. Managers operate in a myriad of relationship structures that are used for making decisions, implementing policy, and identifying public priorities. These relationships give shape, pose constraints, or present opportunities for the way public policy is pursued.

== Definition ==
The management component of the compound idea of inclusive management signifies that inclusion is a managed, ongoing project rather than an attainable state. The inclusion component means something different from the commonplace use of inclusion and exclusion to reference the socioeconomic diversity of the participants. The understanding of inclusion in this analysis emphasizes diversity in terms of the necessity of a diversity of perspectives to promote civic discovery in a deliberative setting. Inclusion involves active boundary spanning across differences in perspectives, institutions, issues, and time, which may or may not be founded upon work to integrate socioeconomically diverse participants.

The inclusion part of the idea is perhaps best encapsulated by the "50/50 rule", a term used by public managers in Grand Rapids, Michigan, to invoke a variety of meanings. Sometimes "50/50" means that process and outcome are equally important, in other words that the effects of a process on community building are as important as the task completion. Sometimes it means that ideally 50% of the people involved in a process have participated in prior, related processes and 50% are newcomers, such that each policy-making effort acknowledges past conversations or decisions yet remains open to new ideas that may alter the previous consensus. From the perspective of the 50/50 rule, things like process and outcome or task and community are not in a trade-off relationship, and indeed are not even separable. In this context, concluding that participation was done "for the sake of participation" rather than to effect the outcome would be a damning critique. Keeping process and outcome, newcomers and old-timers, and past and present in play are ways of creating connections across individuals, groups, interests, and issues. Tasks are accomplished, yet opportunities continue to be open for revising as well as for moving on to the other issues and tasks that emerge or are next in line. This sense of inclusion is part of an ongoing stream of issues and people involved in one process or concern rolling forward into another echoes theorizations of democracy and civic engagement as an ongoing inquiry and never-finished project.

== Relationships with other public management and policy-making ideas ==
Inclusive public management is a newly characterized form of public management following the more traditional forms of public administration, espoused by Woodrow Wilson and political scientists including Frank Goodnow and Charles A. Beard. Analyses of inclusive public management contribute to a stream of practice and research regarding New Public Management popularized by Osborne and Gaebler, particularly recent contributions on reconceptualizing members of the public as partners or coproducers of public services rather than as "customers" of government. Inclusive public management describes some practices of participatory democracy, sharing with deliberative democracy an emphasis on participants making decisions through deliberative processes rather than the mere aggregation of individual interests through voting or other mechanisms, the idea being that through deliberative processes that enable communicative rationality and civic discovery, new understandings and resources of public value or the public good may be realized. It intersects with other fields of research and practice on collaborative governance that describe collaborative processes for making and implementing public policy and urban or regional planning Inclusive management also aligns with recent writings on network governance to the extent that they focus upon cross-boundary collaborations within networks.

== Distinguishing inclusion and participation ==
Inclusive management practices are one way to enact public participation and civic engagement, which may be implemented in a variety of ways. Inclusive management practices are not the same as citizen participation or as inclusion as the latter term is typically used in democratic theory to denote the involvement of ethnically or socioeconomically diverse persons or groups in a decision-making process. Instead, inclusive management theories make a distinction between inclusive practices and participatory practices, which are intersecting dimensions of any civic engagement process. Inclusion is not a term for describing participation that has been done particularly well. Indeed, participation may be done well or badly, as may inclusion. Rather, inclusion and participation are two different approaches to public engagement, with different implications for the roles of the parties involved, the kinds of decisions reached, and the kind of community fostered by engagement. A process may be characterized by one, neither, or both, along two intersecting dimensions of low to high inclusion and low to high participation. The following table identifies the features of high participation and high inclusion.

High Participation	High Inclusion
Many people are invited to participate and/or do participate.; Efforts are made to make the process broadly accessible and representative of public at large.; Community input is collected and influences decisions.; The focus is frequently on a particular proposal or topic, and the process may be conducted on a one-time basis. |	Diverse views are engaged.; The process is deliberative, yielding new understandings of problems and opportunities for action.; The participants in the process take part in defining the problem, the process for decision-making, and the decision outcomes.; Individual processes are part of an ongoing stream of issues, not one-time or one-issue discussions.

== Diversity and representation ==
Quick and Feldman's distinction between inclusion and participation addresses the place of diversity in civic engagement. One potential source of confusion is that the inclusion component of the term inclusive management means something different from the commonplace use of inclusion to refer to the socioeconomic diversity of participants and adequacy of representation or the proportional representativeness of participation in an engagement process. Given the everyday use of the term, characterizing a process that has not had socioeconomically diverse participation as "inclusive" is confusing and may be misread as being dismissive of diversity. Diversity certainly does have a place in inclusive practices. Within the framework of distinguishing inclusion and participation, however, it is not an either/or proposition to decide whether a diverse process is or is not inclusive or participatory. Nor can diversity be assigned to the dimension of inclusion or participation. Instead, diversity can be engaged through participation- or inclusion-oriented strategies, but it has different meanings in these two orientations.

	Participation orientation	Inclusion orientation
Meaning of diversifying the process	Engaging a diverse array of persons	Engaging a diverse array of perspectives
Contributions of diversity	Different persons, who are presumed to bear a diverse array of perspectives related to their identities, produce a fuller range of input that is representative of the community.	Different perspectives, when brought into deliberation, facilitate learning and civic discovery.
Practices for encouraging diversity in the process	Invite many people to participate. Make the process accessible (e.g., provide language translation, child care, or transportation assistance; choose convenient time and place for hard to reach constituencies).	Account for input received (e.g. publish or report back on input gathered, make input visible through dot voting, etc.).Incorporate a diverse range of perspectives into outreach about the process, the framing of topics, and the persons organizing / overseeing the process. Communicate how learning from deliberation will occur and how it is affecting the process (e.g., through revising flow diagram or plan for consultations, processing information and deciding on next steps together, etc.).

== Inclusion in terms of boundaries ==
Inclusion involves transcending dichotomies or engaging boundaries. Dichotomies or boundaries – such as government/non-government, expert/local, internal/external, process/outcome, flexibility/accountability, participation/control, and the temporal or issue scope of a problem – are distinctions that inclusive managers often bring into play.

Broader social theory about the relationship of structure and agency, such as structuration, practice theory, and actor-network theory, or regarding the nature of boundary-work and boundary objects, communities of practice, and the narrative construction of reality, are powerful instruments for analysis in showing the interdependent relations between these dichotomies and clarifying how actions that transcend these dichotomies may be enacted.

== Examples of practices ==
Prior research has identified several inclusive practices, including:

- Seeking to balance control and participation, in part by decentralizing control of an engagement process and outcomes.
- Identifying stakeholders through proper analysis as an important step in optimizing participation and inclusion.
- Performing relational and informational work to bring together political, technical, and experiential domains.
- Recognizing and bringing potential resources into use by aligning them with desired frameworks for public action, and energizing desired frameworks or imaginaries through making the frameworks visible for public discussion and action.
- Managing inclusion as an ongoing process of policy formation and implementation.
- Reflectively narrating civic engagement so that the practices and outcomes of inclusive (or non-inclusive) management are available for others to participate in and evaluate.
- Creating platforms for community action.

To date, researchers have identified inclusive public management practices in communities that have a longstanding commitment to engaging the public, on an ongoing basis, in addressing public concerns together. This research has focused primarily on building public potential to address public problems at the local level of government in the United States. Grand Rapids, Michigan, and Charlotte, North Carolina are cities where inclusive practices have been documented. However, inclusive management practices might be found at any level of government or in any location.

== Benefits ==
Inclusive public management and leadership practices have been found to improve the quality of policy designs or the viability of policies by:

- Enhancing buy-in for implementation from parties affected by the policies;
- Generating better understandings of a public problem and making new connections among people and issues that have produced new ways of seeing and addressing public problems;
- Discovering and enrolling new people and resources into the work that may then be brought into play to address public problems;
- Generating new leadership by creating connections among issues and people, creating platforms for action, and lifting up champions for causes;
- Building capacity for ongoing engagement and implementation of programs and policies related to the decision-making process.
- Facilitating adaptive community change through inclusive processes to address public issues.
