= Johan Olsen =

Norwegian political scientist

Johan P. Olsen
- Born: August 14, 1939 (age 87); Tromsø, Norway
- Citizenship: Norwegian
- Education: University of Bergen
- Spouse: Helene Adriansen
- Scientific career
- Fields: Political science

Johan Peder Olsen (born August 14, 1939) is a Norwegian political scientist, and professor emeritus in political science at the University of Bergen, known for his work on new institutionalism.

== Life and work ==
Olsen obtained his MA in political science, with a minor in economics and political history, at the University of Oslo in 1967. In 1971 he obtained his PhD at the University of Bergen. He obtained an honorary doctorate from the Åbo Akademi, Finland in, 1988, from the University of Copenhagen in 1990. and from the Erasmus University Rotterdam in 2003.

Olsen has started his career as journalist and reporter for various Norwegian newspapers from 1958 to 1963. He started his academic career as research assistant at the Institute of Political Science of the University of Oslo in 1965. In 1969 he was appointed assistant professor at the Institute of Sociology of the University of Bergen, in 1970 associate professor, and in 1973 professor in public administration and organization theory until 1993.

Olsen was also member of the Norwegian Research Council, and a member of the Norwegian Academy of Science and Letters. He established ARENA (Advanced Research on the Europeanization of the Nation State) in 1994. He was research director at ARENA until 2007, and subsequently Professor Emeritus.

Olsen is one of the developers of the systemic-anarchic perspective of organizational decision-making known as the Garbage Can Model.

In 2003 he received an honorary doctorate by the Erasmus University Rotterdam, department of Public Administration. In 2015, Olsen was elected as a fellow of the National Academy of Public Administration.

== Selected publications ==
=== Books ===
- March, James G. and Johan P. Olsen, (eds.). Ambiguity and Choice in Organizations, Bergen Universitetsforlaget, 1976.
- March, James G. & Johan P. Olsen. Rediscovering Institutions: The Organizational Basis of Politics. New York: The Free Press, 1989
- Brunsson, Nils & Johan P. Olsen. The Reforming Organization. London: Routledge, 1993.
- March, James G. & Johan P. Olsen. Democratic Governance. New York: The Free Press, 1995.
- Brunsson, Nils & Johan P. Olsen (eds.). Organizing Organizations. Bergen-Sandviken, Norway: Fagbokförlaget, 1998.

=== Articles ===
- Cohen, Michael D., James G. March, and Johan P. Olsen "A Garbage Can Model of Organizational Choice". Administrative Science Quarterly, 17 (l) (1972): p. 1-25
- March, James G., and Johan P. Olsen. "The new institutionalism: organizational factors in political life." American Political Science Review, 7 (3) (1983): 734-749.
