= Nils Brunsson =

Swedish organizational theorist (born 1946)

- Born: December 26, 1946 (age 79)

Academic work
- Discipline: Economist
- Institutions: Gothenburg School of Economics; University of Gothenburg; Uppsala University; Stockholm School of Economics; European Institute for Advanced Studies in Management; Bielefeld University
- Website: https://www.uu.se/en/contact-and-organisation/staff?query=N10-837

Nils Gustav Magnus Brunsson (born 1946) is a Swedish organizational theorist and Professor in Management at Uppsala University. He is most known for his works in the field of new institutionalism, such as "The organization of hypocrisy" (1989), "The reforming organization" (1993), and "A world of standards" (2010).

== Biography ==
Brunsson obtained his MSc in economics in 1969 at the Gothenburg School of Economics and Commercial Law, wherein 1976, he also obtained his Ph.D. in economics (Ekon Dr) and his habilitation (Docent) in 1979.

Brunsson started his academic career at the Gothenburg School of Economics in 1969 as a Research Assistant and was named Assistant Professor at the University of Gothenburg in 1976. In 1979 he moved to Uppsala University, where he was appointed Assistant Professor. The next year in 1980, he moved to the Stockholm School of Economics, where he was appointed Associate professor. In 1982 he was appointed Professor, the City of Stockholm Chair in Public Management as the successor of Thomas Thorburn, and chair of the Department of Public Management at Stockholm School of Economics, where he served until 2010. In 1997 he was also appointed Professor at the European Institute for Advanced Studies in Management (EIASM); in 2007, Brunsson held the Niklas Luhmann Visiting Professor at Bielefeld University, and in 2010 he was appointed Professor at Uppsala University, holding the Chair of Management.

Brunsson was a co-founder of the Scandinavian Consortium for Organizational Research (Scancor) and a board member from 1988 to 1997. In 1992 he participated in founding the Stockholm Centre for Organizational Research (Score), where he was chairman from the start to 2008.

Brunsson was elected a member of the Royal Swedish Academy of Engineering Sciences in 1990. He was appointed honorary member of the European Group of Organization Studies (EGOS) in 2009. He was the chairman of the Swedish Academy of Management 2010 - 2011.

Brunsson's research includes studies of decision-making, administrative reforms, standardization, and organization outside organizations. He is now working with the organization of markets, and in particular on metaorganizations (i.e. organizations bringing several other organizations under the same umbrella).

== Publications ==
- Brunsson, Nils. The irrational organization: Irrationality as a basis for organizational action and change. John Wiley & Sons, 1985.
- Brunsson, Nils. The organization of hypocrisy: talk, decisions and actions in organizations. (1989).
- Brunsson, Nils, and Johan P. Olsen. The reforming organization. (1993).
- Brunsson, Nils, and Bengt Jacobsson. A world of standards. (2000).
- Brunsson, Nils. The organization of hypocrisy. (2002).
- Brunsson, Nils. "Mechanisms of Hope" (2006).
- Brunsson, Nils. "The Consequences of Decision-Making" (2007).
- Ahrne, Göran, and Brunsson, Nils. "Meta-organizations" (2008)
- Brunsson, Nils. "Reform as Routine" (2009).

Articles, a selection:

- Brunsson, Nils, and Kerstin Sahlin-Andersson. "Constructing organizations: The example of public sector reform." Organization studies 21.4 (2000): 721-746.
