= John Henry Holland =

American researcher in genetic algorithms (1929–2015)

- Born: February 2, 1929; Fort Wayne, Indiana, US
- Died: August 9, 2015 (aged 86); Ann Arbor, Michigan, US
- Education: MIT (B.S.); University of Michigan (M.S., Ph.D.)
- Known for: Research on genetic algorithms
- Awards: MacArthur Fellow (1992); Harold Pender Award (1999); Fellow of the World Economic Forum
- Scientific career
- Fields: Complex systems Psychology; Electrical engineering Computer science
- Workplaces: University of Michigan; Santa Fe Institute
- Thesis: Cycles In Logical Nets (1959)
- Doctoral advisor: Arthur Walter Burks
- Doctoral students: Edgar Codd; Stephen T. Hedetniemi; Melanie Mitchell; Rick L. Riolo; Bernard Zeigler

John Henry Holland (February 2, 1929 – August 9, 2015) was an American scientist and professor of electrical engineering and computer science at the University of Michigan. He was a pioneer in what became known as genetic algorithms.

== Biography ==
John Henry Holland was born on February 2, 1929 in Fort Wayne, Indiana, the elder child of Gustave A. Holland (b. July 24, 1896, Russian Poland) and Mildred P. Gfroerer (b. July 1, 1901, Columbus Grove, Ohio). He had one younger sister, Shirley Ann "Hollie" Holland (born c. 1931).

Holland studied physics at the Massachusetts Institute of Technology and received a B.S. degree in 1950. He then studied Mathematics at the University of Michigan, receiving an M.S. in 1954. In 1959, he received the first computer science Ph.D. from the University of Michigan. He was a Professor of psychology and Professor of electrical engineering and computer science at the University of Michigan, Ann Arbor. He held visiting positions at the Rowland Institute for Science and the University of Bergen.

According to Carl Simon, professor of mathematics, economics, complex systems and public policy, "Holland is best known for his role as a founding father of the complex systems approach. In particular, he developed genetic algorithms and learning classifier systems. These foundational building blocks of an evolutionary approach to optimization are now included in all texts on optimization and programming."

Holland was a member of the Board of Trustees and Science Board of the Santa Fe Institute and a fellow of the World Economic Forum.

Holland received the 1961 Louis E. Levy Medal from The Franklin Institute, and the MacArthur Fellowship in 1992.

He was profiled extensively in chapters 5 and 7 of the book Complexity (1993), by M. Mitchell Waldrop.

Holland died on August 9, 2015, in Ann Arbor, Michigan.

== Work ==
Holland frequently lectured around the world on his own research, and on research and open questions in complex adaptive systems (CAS) studies. In 1975, he wrote the ground-breaking book on genetic algorithms, "Adaptation in Natural and Artificial Systems". He also developed Holland's schema theorem.

== Publications ==
Holland authored a number of books about complex adaptive systems, including:

- Adaptation in Natural and Artificial Systems (1975, MIT Press)
- Hidden Order: How Adaptation Builds Complexity (1995, Basic Books); reviewed by Mark S. Miller in Reason
- Emergence: From Chaos to Order (1998, Basic Books)
- Signals and Boundaries: Building Blocks for Complex Adaptive Systems (2012, MIT Press)
- Complexity: A Very Short Introduction (2014, Oxford University Press)

Articles, a selection:

- "A universal computer capable of executing an arbitrary number of subprograms simultaneously", in: Proc. Eastern Joint Comp. Conf. (1959), pp. 108–112
- "Iterative circuit computers", in: Proc. Western Joint Comp. Conf. (1960), pp. 259–265
- "Outline for a logical theory of adaptive systems", in: JACM, Vol 9 (1962), no. 3, pp. 279–314
- "Hierarchical descriptions, universal spaces, and adaptive systems", in: Arthur W. Burks, editor. Essays on Cellular Automata (1970). University of Illinois Press
- "Using Classifier Systems to Study Adaptive Nonlinear Networks", in: Daniel L. Stein, editor. Lectures in the Sciences of Complexity (1989). Addison Wesley
- "Concerning the Emergence of Tag-Mediated Lookahead in Classifier Systems", in: Stephanie Forrest, editor. Emergent Computation: self-organizing, collective, and cooperative phenomena in natural and computing networks (1990). MIT Press
- "The Royal Road for Genetic Algorithms: Fitness Landscapes and GA Performance", in: Francisco J. Varela, Paul Bourgine, editors. Toward a Practice of Autonomous Systems: proceedings of the first European conference on Artificial Life (1992). MIT Press
- "Echoing Emergence: objectives, rough definitions, and speculations for ECHO-class models", in: George A. Cowan, David Pines, David Meltzer, editors. Complexity: metaphors, models, and reality (1994), Addison-Wesley
- "Can There Be A Unified Theory of Complex Adaptive Systems?", in: Harold J. Morowitz, Jerome L. Singer, editors. The Mind, The Brain, and Complex Adaptive Systems (1995). Addison-Wesley
- "Board Games", in: John Brockman, editor. The Greatest Inventions of the Past 2000 Years (2000). Phoenix
- "What is to Come and How to Predict It.", in: John Brockman, editor. The Next Fifty Years: science in the first half of the twenty-first century (2002). Weidenfeld & Nicolson
