= Thomas Thorburn =

Swedish economist (1913–2003)

Thomas William Thorburn (April 13, 1913 - March 13, 2003) was a Swedish economist, and Professor of Business Administration at the Stockholm School of Economics, known from his work on the "Supply and demand of water transport" (1960), and the "Cost-benefit analysis in language planning" (1971).

Born in Uddevalla, Thorburn obtained his PhD in 1960 at the Stockholm School of Economics with the thesis, entitled "Supply and demand of water transport: studies in cost and revenue structures of ships, ports and transport buyers with respect to their effects on supply and demand of water carriage of goods."

After his graduation Thorburn served his academic career at the Stockholm School of Economics, where he was Professor in Business Administration from 1961 to 1978. He was succeeded by Nils Brunsson.

== Selected publications ==
- Thomas Thorburn. Supply and Demand of Water Transport: Studies in Cost and Revenue Structures of Ships, Ports, and Transport Buyers with Respect to Their Effects on Supply and Demand of Water Transport of Goods. Business Research Institute, Stockholm School for Economics, 1960
- Thomas Thorburn. Förvaltningsekonomi: ekonomiska beslut i offentlig förvaltning. Prisma, 1974
- Thorburn, Thomas. Economics of transport: the Swedish case, 1780-1980. Vol. 12. Almqvist & Wiksell Intl, 2000.

Articles, a selection:

- Thorburn, Thomas. "Cost-benefit analysis in language planning." in: Can language be planned (1971): 283–305.
