= Rick L. Riolo =

Complex systems researcher

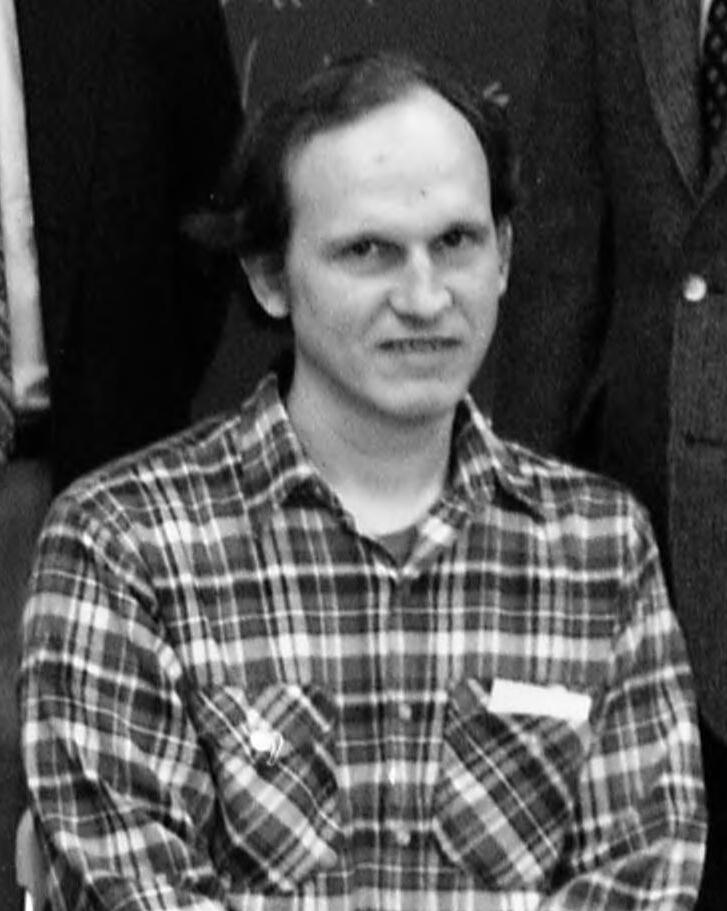
Riolo as a doctoral student at the University of Michigan

Rick L. Riolo (1950-2018) was a complex systems researcher and full professor at University of Michigan.

== Biography ==
Rick Riolo was born in East Lansing, Michigan on September 4, 1950 He was married to Sue Monet and they had one daughter, Maria Annichia Riolo. He received an undergraduate degree at UMich in 1972 for molecular biology did his Ph.D. at University of Michigan under John H. Holland in 1988 in computer science. He was one of the first two faculty members of the Program for the Study of Complex Systems at University of Michigan, established in the late-1980s. He use computational techniques to study a wide variety of fields, including the evolution of cooperation, genetic algorithms, agent-based modelling, and genetic computing. In 2018, he died of a degenerative muscle disorder.

== Bibliography ==
=== Books ===
- Riolo, Rick; Worzel, Bill (2012-12-06). Genetic Programming Theory and Practice. Springer Science & Business Media. ISBN 978-1-4419-8983-3.

=== Papers ===
- Yang, Yong; Auchincloss, Amy H.; Rodriguez, Daniel A.; Brown, Daniel G.; Riolo, Rick; Diez-Roux, Ana V. (2015-05-01). "Modeling spatial segregation and travel cost influences on utilitarian walking: Towards policy intervention". Computers, Environment and Urban Systems. 51: 59–69. doi:10.1016/J.COMPENVURBSYS.2015.01.007. PMC 4342617.
- Savit, Robert; Riolo, Maria; Riolo, Rick (2013-09-10). "Co-adaptation and the emergence of structure". PLOS ONE. 8 (9) e71828. doi:10.1371/JOURNAL.PONE.0071828. PMC 3769280.
- Simon, Carl P.; Percha, Bethany; Riolo, Rick; Foxman, Betsy (2013-06-06). "Modeling bacterial colonization and infection routes in health care settings: analytic and numerical approaches". Journal of Theoretical Biology. 334: 187–199. doi:10.1016/J.JTBI.2013.05.016.
- Auchincloss, Amy H.; Riolo, Rick L.; Brown, Daniel G.; Cook, Jeremy; Diez Roux, Ana V. (2011-03-01). "An agent-based model of income inequalities in diet in the context of residential segregation". American Journal of Preventive Medicine. 40 (3): 303–311. doi:10.1016/J.AMEPRE.2010.10.033. PMC 3625685.
- Riolo, Rick L.; Cohen, Michael D.; Axelrod, Robert (2001-11-01). "Evolution of cooperation without reciprocity". Nature. 414 (6862): 441–443. doi:10.1038/35106555. hdl:2027.42/62686.
