= Organisational routines =

Repetitive, recognizable patterns of interdependent actions

In organisational theory, organisational routines are "repetitive, recognizable patterns of interdependent actions carried out by multiple actors".

In evolution and evolutionary economics routines serve as social replicators – mechanisms that help to maintain organisational behaviors and knowledge. In the theory of organisational learning, routines serve as a sort of memory, especially of uncodified, tacit knowledge. In strategic management, especially in the resource-based view of firms, organisational routines form the microfoundations of organisational capabilities and dynamic capabilities.

Despite the extensive usage of the routines concept in the research literature, there is still much debate about organisational routines. For example, scholars see them both as a source of stability and as a driver of organisational change. In an attempt to better understand the "inside" of organisational routines, Pentland and Feldman offered the distinction between the ostensive and performative aspects of routines. The latter refers to the actual actions performed by actors, while the former often refers to some abstract "script" that represent that routines more abstractly. Cohen and Bacdayan showed that from a cognitive perspective, routines are stored as procedural memory (and not declarative, for example), and hence it is not likely that there is script that codifies routines. In contrast, some scholars have likened routines to grammars of actions.

== Foundation of routines ==
=== Carnegie School ===
The concept of organisational routines can be linked to the Carnegie School.

- In this regard, Dewey's (1922) work construed habits as a form of reflective action and as major driver of individual and collective behaviour.
- In later years, Stene (1940) described organisational routines as interaction patterns that are pertinent for the coordination of organisational activities and differentiated them from actions that are preceded by decision making.
- According to Simon, individual's ideas are boundedly rational and organizations are rational systems wherein coordination and resolution of conflict is necessary. He also contended that organisational routines develop to save time and attention during the analysis and making of decisions. Such routines are combined with performance programs that enable organisations to respond to the changes in the environment. The standard rules and behavioural patterns bring about effective organisational decision-making processes as they reinforce search issues, conflict resolution and environment adaptation.

=== Nelson and Winter book ===
The cognitive underpinnings of organisational behaviour of the Carnegie School were substantiated by the aspects of emotion and habit. To this end, Nelson and Winter's book entitled "An Evolutionary Theory of Economic Change", dated 1982, is considered as the top influential work dedicated to routines and reveals the efforts of the authors in providing a deeper explanation of organisational behaviour that goes against traditional assumptions of neoclassical economics. In this book, routines are defined as regular and predictable firm patterns and the authors proposed that they act like biological genes as they are heritable and selectable by the environment. As such, they provide the basis of the organisation's evolutionary change (e.g. production or implementation) as opposed to knowing how to choose (e.g. deliberation, alternative selection or modification).

On the other hand, capabilities are described as the various things that a firm can do at any point in time and is a term that is synonymously used with routines. Individual skills were employed by Nelson and Winter to explain routines in that they suggested that routines coordinated behaviours that function smoothly. Routines are considered as performance targets that offer mechanisms for control and platforms for replication. They are also repository of organisational memory within organisations as organisations keep track of specific routines by specific individuals as a reaction to distinct stimulus. According to Nelson and Winter, routines contextual basis lies on skills, organizations and technology that are combined in a single functioning routines.

Routines are also the basis for change in that innovation refers to the new combinations of existing routines. In other words, the notion of routines is expanded beyond the simple procedures and programs. Added to this, it drew work from the capabilities perspective by introducing a firm-specific, path-dependent concept of routines that stresses on their complexity and underlies their influence on the differences in performance. Despite the fact that it is grounded in evolutionary economics and hence paying minimal focus on individual agency in routines, significant number of ideas remains aligned with the practice perspective.

Moreover, Nelson and Winter expected the recent focus on endogenous change in routines when they contended that routine operation is aligned with routinely arising laxity, slippage, rule-breaking, defiance and sabotage. However, ambiguities still arise concerning the intentionality of routines and the level to their stability and change, where some scholars addressed the behavioural regularities of routines and their habitual nature, specifically bringing forward that they are mindlessly conducted until they are disturbed by an external change. This is aligned with the notion of routines as heuristics and simple rule of thumb to tackle daily decisions.

=== Weick and Roberts approach ===
In relation to this, Weick and Roberts adopted a cognitive approach by explaining that tacit coordination and heedful interrelationships in activity systems of routines stem from a collective mind and the shared consensus of the way tasks are completed and each individual's role indicates an innate and distinct view of routines.

This argument was countered by Pentland who contended that the performance of routines require individuals' selection of an action from a list of actions where the performance outcome is thought to be effortful achievements. Pentland's work is the basis for the practice perspective as it pays attention to the daily actions related with distinct routines. On the basis of such basic understanding, organisational routines refer to the repetitive patterns of interdependent organisational actions – a definition aligned with the foundations of routines and with the capabilities and practice perspectives emerging from this work with differing focus. On one hand, the capabilities perspective is based on the organisational economics point of view where routines are considered as a black box and is focused on accomplishing organisational goals and on the other hand, the practice perspective is based on organisational theory where the black box processes are emphasized.

== The Concept of Routines ==
Routine is based on the premise of patterns developed by activities over time. Despite this premise, there is still confusion on the actual meaning of activity. The literature analysis presented by Becker is consistent with the routines definition as the recurrent interaction of patterns and it stresses on the collective nature of routines rather than the individual nature of habits. Routines are core to the economic and business phenomena owing to their roles in the organisation.

=== Organizational roles ===
Routines have several organisational roles:

- routines coordinate and control. Coordination is when the simultaneity of action is enabled after which it leads to regularity, consistency and predictability and it can easily change into control.
- Routines also reflect a truce in that they are developed on a micro-political stability that enables their free functioning. Nelson and Winter explained that such an aspect of routines have been largely ignored although it is crucial in terms of evolutionary theory outcomes. Without such truce, the explanation behind the disturbing interference in the routine environment and their stability will be lacking.
- Routines are major mechanisms in economizing on bounded cognitive resources by freeing up such resources on the greater awareness levels via the relegation of repetitive decisions to be tackled through semi-conscious mechanisms. Attention is focused on the exceptional events rather than the repetitive ones, and as such, the search is guided by experience and in this way, routines significantly contribute to the actor's ability to handle uncertainty.
- Routines assist in handling uncertainty with two mechanisms underlying this potential namely, the freeing up of mental resources through relegation of activities, and setting up a specific predictability of other participants via the constraints of setting.
- Routines can create inertia, driven by cognitive sunk costs but this does not necessarily mean there is no potential for variations and
- Routines do not have to result in inertia as it can also result in stability. This function is ignored in favour of the pathological condition 'inertia'. The stability provision plays a key role in learning as it allows comparison. Therefore, routines have a role in the provision of stability and the implementation of change. It is generally important to acknowledge them as having enabling as opposed to limiting roles.
- Rutines are combined with other routines, and such can urge other routines – a trigger could be made up of aspiration levels.
- Routines represent knowledge like tacit knowledge and knowledge in action. Such embodiment is sensitive to specific levels of interruptions in the routine exercise.
- We may distinguish between operational routines and strategic or dynamic routines which guide organisational search and change. In this latter respect, there are clear links with the literature on dynamic capabilities.

== Characteristics of Routines ==
Developing an argument on the basis of the above contention that routines are recurrent interaction patterns, literature characterizes routines as repetitive by virtue of recurrence, persistent, leading to predictability, interaction patterns having a collective nature, interplay of collective patterns constituting a whole out of different routines parts.

In other words, routines in organisations constitute collective action that integrates distributed action elements. Routines are also self-actuating and they do not need voluntary deliberation and owing to this characteristic, problems are removed from the conscious influence and cognitive resources are freed up for deliberative action when dealt with routines. Moreover, routines are processual phenomenon, they are context dependent, specific and they can only be transferred to a limited level. In this regard, successful routines application depends on the context specificities where there exist complementarities between routines and context.

It is possible to alleviate specificity but not to neutralize it through standardisation. Routines can be transferred to various contexts in a limited manner indicating that they can reflect local optimum solutions but not global best solutions. History shapes routines and they are dependent on the path. Such path-dependent routines clarifies their involvement with mutually dependent forces that positively or negatively provides feedback between them and has no pre-defined ending to which they meet. To this end, changes will most probably be incremental and developed on prior state and hence, being an insider to the routine history makes a difference in comprehending its present form.

== Metaphors about routines ==
Regardless of the several variant interpretations and conceptualizations of routines taking place, some generic attributes have been attached to the role which routines possess. Routines have been described to act as central repositories of organisational knowledge and to provide the building blocks of organisational capabilities and change

- Cyert and March used a metaphor of routines as performance programs,
- Nelson and Winter portray routines as habits or skills of an organization
- Routines allow certain type of performance to be repeated, however as they adapt to the changes provided by their environment, routines rather paradoxically are seen to provide both stability and change inside organizations
- Another analogy often quoted to describe routines as facilitating firm actions is "routines as genes"
- At the organisational level of analysis, Nelson and Winter introduced a wide variety of metaphors for routines: routines as genes, routines as memory, routines as truce, routines as targets for control, replication, and imitation 3. Each of these metaphors portrays a routine as a kind of thing.
- Another view of routines is as a set of possibilities that can be described as grammars. The grammatical approach attempts to look at the inside of routines. Selecting and performing a routine is an effortful accomplishment. It is not a single pattern but, rather, a set of possible patterns from which organisational members enact particular performances that are functionally similar but not necessarily the same. Routines can be described by a grammar that explains the regular patterns in a variety of behaviors. In the same way as English grammar allows speakers to produce a variety of sentences; an organisational routine allows members to produce a variety of performances. Thus a routinized activity is not mindless or automatic, but rather an effortful accomplishment within certain boundaries.
