= James G. March =

American political scientist, sociologist, and economist

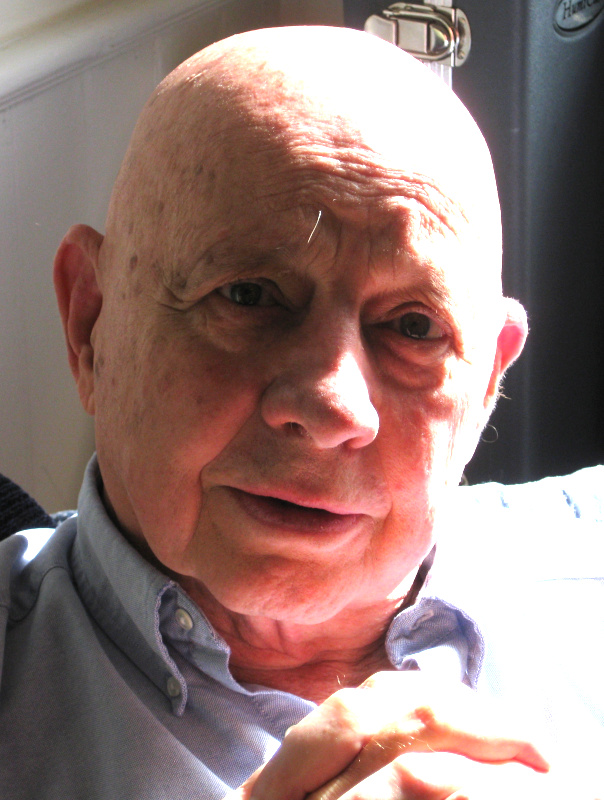
- March in 2010
- Born: January 15, 1928; Cleveland, Ohio, U.S.
- Died: September 27, 2018 (aged 90); Portola Valley, California, U.S.
- Education: Yale University
- Scientific career
- Fields: Political science, organization theory
- Workplaces: Carnegie Institute of Technology; University of California, Irvine; Stanford University
- Doctoral students: Joseph I. Castro

James Gardner March (January 15, 1928 – September 27, 2018) was an American political scientist, sociologist, and economist. A professor at Stanford University in the Stanford Graduate School of Business and Stanford Graduate School of Education, he is best known for his research on organizations, his seminal work with Richard Cyert on A Behavioral Theory of the Firm, and the organizational decision making model known as the Garbage Can Model.

== Early life and education ==
Born in Cleveland, Ohio in 1928, March received his B.A. from the University of Wisconsin at Madison in 1945 in political science. He received his M.A. in 1950 and Ph.D. in 1953 from Yale University, both in political science.

James March was awarded honorary doctorate from numerous universities:

- Copenhagen Business School (then: Copenhagen School of Economics), 1978
- Hanken School of Economics (Helsinki), 1979
- University of Wisconsin-Milwaukee, 1980
- University of Bergen, 1980; (Economics)
- Uppsala University, 1987; (EkDhc, Faculty of Social Sciences)
- Helsinki School of Economics, 1991
- Dublin City University, 1994; (Economics)
- Göteborg University, 1998
- University of Poitiers, 2001
- University of Trento, 2000
- University of Southern Denmark, 2003
- Budapest University of Economics, 2003
- York University (Toronto), 2007
- Hautes Etudes Commerciales (HEC Paris), 2007
- Ramon Llull University (Barcelona), 2007
- Lappeenranta (Finland) University of Technology, 2008
- Stockholm (Sweden) Stockholm School of Economics, 2009

== Career ==
From 1953 to 1964, he had served on the faculties of the Carnegie Institute of Technology as a senior research fellow and assistant professor, and later professor of industrial administration and psychology.

For the academic year of 1955–56, March was a Political Science Fellow at the Stanford University Center for Advanced Study in the Behavioral Sciences.

From 1964 to 1970, March joined the faculty at the University of California, Irvine as the founding Dean of the School of Social Sciences (1964–69). He was also a professor of psychology and sociology.

In 1970, March moved to Stanford University. At Stanford, he held several titles, including professor of political science and sociology, David Jacks Professor of Higher Education (1970–1978), professor of management (1978–1979), Fred H. Merrill Professor of Management (1979–1992), Jack Steele Parker Professor of International Management (1992–present). He had also served as a senior fellow at the Hoover Institution (1978–1987) and the founding director of the Scandinavian Consortium for Organizational Research (Scancor) (1989–1999).

He had been elected to the National Academy of Sciences, the American Academy of Arts and Sciences, the American Philosophical Society, and the National Academy of Education, and had been a member of the National Science Board. He was a member of the Royal Swedish Academy of Sciences and the Norwegian Academy of Science and Letters.

He interacted and communicated in many different forms as books, articles, interactive seminars, films and poetry.

== Contributions ==
March was highly respected for his broad theoretical perspective which combined theories from psychology and other behavioural sciences. As a core member of the Carnegie School, he collaborated with the cognitive psychologist Herbert A. Simon on several works on organization theory.

March was also known for his seminal work on the behavioural perspective on the theory of the firm along with Richard Cyert.

In 1972, March worked together with Johan Olsen and Michael D. Cohen on the systemic-anarchic perspective of organizational decision making known as the Garbage Can Model.

The scope of his academic work was broad but focused on understanding how decisions happen in individuals, groups, organizations, companies and society. He explores factors that influence decision making, such as risk orientation, leadership and the ambiguity of the present and the past; politics and vested interests by stakeholders; the challenges of giving and receiving advice; the challenges of organizational and individual learning and the challenges of balancing exploration and exploitation in organizations.

== Awards ==
March received numerous awards, including:

- 1968 Wilbur Lucius Cross Medal, Yale University
- 1984 Scholarly Contributions to Management Award (Irwin Award), Academy of Management
- 1995 Walter J. Gores Award for Excellence in Teaching, Stanford University
- 1997 John Gaus Award from the American Political Science Association
- OMT Distinguished Scholar Award, Academy of Management
- 2004 Viipuri Prize, Viipuri School of Economics
- 2004 Aaron Wildavsky Enduring Contribution Award, American Political Science Association
- 2005 Herbert A. Simon Award, Budapest University of Economics
- 2016 Progress Medal from the Society for Progress

== Personal ==
James March was the father of four children and a grandfather. He died on September 27, 2018, aged 90.

== Bibliography: Selected Articles ==
- March, James G. (June 1955). "An introduction to the theory and measurement of influence" (PDF). The American Political Science Review. XLIX (2): 431–451. doi:10.2307/1951813. JSTOR 1951813. S2CID 145564166.
- Levitan, Richard E.; March, James G. (1957). "A Set of Necessary, Sufficient, and Independent Conditions for Proportional Representation" (abstract)". Econometrica. 25 (2): 361–362. JSTOR 1910262.
- March, James G. (1958). "A Behavioral Theory of Decision Making". Personnel Administration. 21 (3): 8–10.
- Cyert, Richard M.; Dill, William R.; March, James G. (1958). "The Role of Expectations in Business Decision-Making". Administrative Science Quarterly. 3 (3): 309–340. doi:10.2307/2390716. JSTOR 2390716.
- March, James G. (1962). "The Business Firm as a Political Coalition". Journal of Politics. 24 (4): 662–678. doi:10.1017/s0022381600016169. S2CID 222430292.
- James G. March, "The Power of Power", pp. 39–70 in David Easton, ed., Varieties of Political Theory. Englewood Cliffs, NJ: Prentice-Hall, 1966.
- James G. March, "The Technology of Foolishness", Civiløkonomen (Copenhagen), 18 (1971) 4, 4–12.
- Cohen, Michael D.; March, James G.; Olsen, Johan P. (1972). "A Garbage Can Model of Organizational Choice". Administrative Science Quarterly. 17 (1): 1–25. doi:10.2307/2392088. JSTOR 2392088.
- March, James G.; Olsen, Johan P. (1975). "The Uncertainty of the Past: Organizational Learning Under Ambiguity". European Journal of Political Research. 3 (2): 147–171. doi:10.1111/j.1475-6765.1975.tb00521.x.
- March, James G. (1978). "Bounded Rationality, Ambiguity, and the Engineering of Choice". Bell Journal of Economics. 9 (2): 587–608. doi:10.2307/3003600. JSTOR 3003600.
- March, James G. (1979). "Ambiguity and the Engineering of Choice". International Studies of Management and Organizations. 9 (3): 9–39. doi:10.1080/00208825.1979.11656270.
- March, James C.; March, James G. (1981). "Performance Sampling and Weibull Distributions". Administrative Science Quarterly. 26 (1): 90–92. doi:10.2307/2392602. JSTOR 2392602.
- Martha S. Feldman and James G. March, "Information in Organizations as Signal and Symbol", Administrative Science Quarterly, 26 (1981) 171–186.
- James G. March, "Decisions in Organizations and Theories of Choice", pp. 205–244 in Andrew Van de Ven and William Joyce, eds., Perspectives on Organization Design and Behavior. New York, NY: Wiley Interscience, 1981.
- March, James G. (1981). "Footnotes to Organizational Change". Administrative Science Quarterly. 26 (4): 563–577. doi:10.2307/2392340. JSTOR 2392340.
- Levinthal, Daniel; March, James G. (1981). "A Model of Adaptive Organizational Search". Journal of Economic Behavior and Organization. 2 (4): 307–333. doi:10.1016/0167-2681(81)90012-3.
- James G. March and Zur Shapira, "Behavioral Decision Theory and Organizational Decision Theory", pp. 92–115 in Gerardo Ungson and Daniel Braunstein, eds., Decision Making: An Interdisciplinary Inquiry. Boston, MA: Kent Publishing Company, 1982.
- Harrison, J. Richard; March, James G. (1984). "Decision Making and Post-Decision Surprises". Administrative Science Quarterly. 29 (1): 26–42. doi:10.2307/2393078. JSTOR 2393078.
- James G. March and Guje Sevón, "Gossip, Information, and Decision-Making", pp. 95–107 in Lee S. Sproull and J. Patrick Crecine, eds., Advances in Information Processing in Organizations, Vol. I. Greenwich, CT: JAI Press, 1984.
- March, James G.; Olsen, Johan P. (1984). "The New Institutionalism: Organizational Factors in Political Life". American Political Science Review. 78 (3): 734–749. doi:10.2307/1961840. JSTOR 1961840. S2CID 58917412.
- Herriott, Scott R.; Levinthal, Daniel; March, James G. (1985). "Learning from Experience in Organizations". American Economic Review. 75: 298–302.
- James R. Glenn Jr., and James G. March, "Presidential Time Allocation 1970–1984", pp. 263–266 in Michael D. Cohen and James G. March, Leadership and Ambiguity, 2nd ed. Cambridge, MA: Harvard Business School Press, 1986.
- Eaton Baier, Vicki; March, James G.; Sætren, Harald (1986). "Implementation and Ambiguity". Scandinavian Journal of Management Studies. 2 (3–4): 197–212. doi:10.1016/0281-7527(86)90016-2.
- James G. March, "Theories of Making Choice and Making Decisions", pp. 305–325 in Rolf Wolff, ed., Organizing Industrial Development - Visible Guiding Hands. Berlin: de Gruyter, 1986.
- James G. March, "Ambiguity and Accounting: The Elusive Link between Information and Decision Making", Accounting, Organizations, and Society, 12 (1987) 153–168. Also pp. 31–49 in Barry E. Cushing, ed., Accounting and Culture, American Accounting Association, 1987.
- March, James G.; Shapira, Zur (1987). "Managerial Perspectives on Risk and Risk Taking". Management Science. 33 (11): 1404–1418. doi:10.1287/mnsc.33.11.1404. S2CID 42901494.
- Levitt, Barbara; March, James G. (1988). "Organizational Learning". Annual Review of Sociology. 14: 319–340. doi:10.1146/annurev.soc.14.1.319.
- James G. March and Guje Sevón, "Behavioral Perspectives on Theories of the Firm", pp. 369–402 in W. Fred van Raaij, Gery M. van Veldhoven, and Karl-Erik Wärneryd, eds., Handbook of Economic Psychology. Dordrecht, Netherlands: Kluwer Academic Publishers, 1988.
- James G. March and Lee S. Sproull, "Technology, Management, and Competitive Advantage", pp. 144–173 in Paul S. Goodman, Lee S. Sproull and Associates, Technology and Organizations. San Francisco: Jossey-Bass, 1990.
- March, James G.; Sproull, Lee S.; Tamuz, Michal (1991). "Learning from Samples of One or Fewer". Organization Science. 2 (6): 1–13. doi:10.1287/orsc.2.1.1.
- March, James G. (1991). "Exploration and Exploitation in Organizational Learning". Organization Science. 2 (1): 71–87. doi:10.1287/orsc.2.1.71.
- March, James G. (1991). "Organizational Consultants and Organizational Research". Journal of Applied Communication Research. 19 (1–2): 20–31. doi:10.1080/00909889109365290.
- March, James G. (1991). "How Decisions Happen in Organizations". Human-Computer Interaction. 6 (2): 95–117. doi:10.1207/s15327051hci0602_1.
- March, James G.; Simon, Herbert A. (1993). "Organizations Revisited". Industrial and Corporate Change. 2: 299–316. doi:10.1093/icc/2.1.299.
- Levinthal, D. A.; March, James G. (1993). "The myopia of learning". Strategic Management Journal. 14(S2): 95–112. doi:10.1002/smj.4250141009.
- March, James G. (1995). "The Future, Disposable Organizations and the Rigidities of Imagination". Organization. 2(3-4): 427–440. doi:10.1177/135050849523009.
- March, James G. (2006). "Rationality, Foolishness, and Adaptive Intelligence". Strategic Management Journal. 27 (3): 201–214. doi:10.1002/smj.515.
- James G. March and Johan P. Olsen, "The Logic of Appropriateness", pp. 689–708 in Michael Moran, Martin Rein, and Robert E. Goodin (eds.) The Oxford Handbook of Public Policy. Oxford: Oxford University Press, 2006.
- James G. March and Johan P. Olsen, "Elaborating the 'New Institutionalism'", pp. 3–20 in R.A.W. Rhodes, S. Binder and B. Rockman (eds.) The Oxford Handbook of Political Institutions. Oxford: Oxford University Press, 2006.
- March, James G. (2007). "The Study of Organizations and Organizing Since 1945". Organization Studies. 28: 9–19. doi:10.1177/0170840607075277. S2CID 145682383.
- Augier, Mie; March, James G. (2007). "The Pursuit of Relevance in Management Education". California Management Review. 49 (3): 129–146. doi:10.2307/41166398. JSTOR 41166398. S2CID 144082140.
- March, James G. (2007). "Scholarship, Scholarly Institutions, and Scholarly Communities". Organization Science. 18 (3): 537–542. doi:10.1287/orsc.1070.0269.
- March, James G. (2007). "Ibsen, Ideals, and the Subornation of Lies". Organization Studies. 28 (8): 1277–1285. doi:10.1177/0170840607079223. S2CID 144447404.
- Michael D. Cohen, James G. March, and Johan P. Olsen, "The Garbage Can Model", International Encyclopedia of Organization Studies, Sage, forthcoming 2008.
- Augier, Mie; March, James G. (2008). "Realism and Comprehension in Economics: A Footnote to an Exchange between Oliver E. Williamson and Herbert A. Simon". Journal of Economic Behavior and Organization. 66: 95–105. doi:10.1016/j.jebo.2007.05.003.

== Bibliography: Books ==
March wrote many books including some with different co-authors:

- James G. March and Herbert A. Simon, Organizations. New York: Wiley, 1958. 2nd ed., Oxford: Blackwell Publishers, 1993. Translated into Arabic, Chinese, Dutch, French, German, Italian, Japanese, Polish, Portuguese, and Spanish. Voted the seventh most influential management book of the 20th century in a poll of the fellows of the Academy of Management.
- Richard M. Cyert and James G. March, A Behavioral Theory of the Firm. Englewood Cliffs, NJ: Prentice-Hall, 1963. 2nd ed., Oxford: Blackwell Publishers, 1992. Translated into Chinese, French, German, Italian, and Japanese.
- James G. March, ed., Handbook of Organizations. Chicago, IL: Rand McNally, 1965.
- Heinz Eulau and James G. March, eds., Political Science. Englewood Cliffs, NJ: Prentice-Hall, 1969.
- Bernard R. Gelbaum and James G. March, Mathematics for the Social and Behavioral Sciences: Probability, Calculus and Statistics. Philadelphia, PA: W. B. Saunders Co., 1969.
- Michael D. Cohen and James G. March, Leadership and Ambiguity: The American College President. New York, NY: McGraw-Hill, 1974. 2nd ed., Cambridge, MA: Harvard Business School Press, 1986.
- Charles A. Lave and James G. March, An Introduction to Models in the Social Sciences. New York: Harper and Row, 1975. 2nd ed., Lanham, MD: University Press of America, 1993. Translated into Dutch, Japanese, and Spanish. (1975) ISBN 0-8191-8381-4
- James G. March and Johan P. Olsen, Ambiguity and Choice in Organizations. Bergen, Norway: Universitetsforlaget, 1976. Translated into Japanese. (1980) ISBN 82-00-01960-8
- James G. March, Autonomy as a Factor in Group Organization: A Study in Politics, New York: Arno Press, 1980. ISBN 0-405-12980-7
- James G. March and Roger Weissinger-Baylon, eds., Ambiguity and Command: Organizational Perspectives on Military Decision Making. Cambridge, MA: Ballinger, 1986.
- James G. March, Decisions and Organizations. Oxford: Basil Blackwell, 1988. ISBN 0-631-16856-7. Translated into French, German, Italian, and Japanese.
- James G. March and Johan P. Olsen, Rediscovering Institutions: The Organizational Basis of Politics. New York: Free Press/Macmillan, 1989. Translated into Italian and Spanish. ISBN 0-02-920115-2
- James G. March, A Primer on Decision Making: How Decisions Happen. New York, NY: The Free Press, 1994. Translated into Chinese, Greek, and Italian. ISBN 0-02-920035-0
- James G. March, Fornuft og Forandring: Ledelse i en Verden Beriget av Uklarhet (Danish: Reason and Change: Leadership in a World Enriched by Ambiguity), articles selected and translated by Kristian Kreiner and Marianne Risberg. Copenhagen: Samfundslitteratur, 1995.
- James G. March and Johan P. Olsen, Democratic Governance. New York, NY: The Free Press, 1995. ISBN 0-02-874054-8. Translated into Italian.
- James G. March, The Pursuit of Organizational Intelligence. Oxford: Blackwell Publishers, 1999. ISBN 0-631-21102-0.
- James G. March, Martin Schulz, and Xueguang Zhou, The Dynamics of Rules: Change in Written Organizational Codes. Stanford, CA: Stanford University Press, 2000. ISBN 0-8047-3996-X. Translated into Chinese and Italian.
- Mie Augier and James G. March, eds., Economics of Change, Choice, and Organization: Essays in Memory of Richard M. Cyert. Cheltenham, UK: Edward Elgar Publishing, Ltd., 2002.
- James G. March and Thierry Weil, Le leadership dans les organizations. (French: Leadership in Organizations). Paris: Les Presses de l'École des Mines, 2003. Translated into English as On Leadership. See below.
- Mie Augier and James G. March, eds., Models of a Man: Essays in Memory of Herbert A. Simon. Cambridge, MA: MIT Press, 2004.
- James G. March, Valg, Vane og Vision: Perspektiver på Aspiration og Adfærd (Danish: Choice, Habit and Vision: Perspectives on Aspirations and Behavior), articles selected and translated by Kristian Kreiner and Mie Augier. Copenhagen: Samfundslitteratur, 2005.
- James G. March, Szervezeti tanulás és döntéshozatal (Hungarian: Organizational Learning and Decision Making), articles selected and translated by students at the László Rajk College. Budapest: Alinea Kiadó, 2005.
- James G. March and Thierry Weil, On Leadership. Oxford, UK: Blackwell Publishers, 2005. ISBN 1-4051-3247-7. Translated into Spanish, Korean, Italian, Chinese.
- James G. March, Explorations in Organizations. Stanford, CA: Stanford University Press, 2008.
- James G. March, The Ambiguities of Experience. Ithaca, NY: Cornell University Press, 2010.

== Bibliography: Films ==
- Passion and Discipline: Don Quixote's Lessons for Leadership. A film (67 minutes) conceived and written by James G. March, produced and directed by Steven C. Schecter. Schecter Films (in association with the Stanford Graduate School of Business), 2003.
- Heroes and History: The Lessons for Leadership from Tolstoy's War and Peace. A film (65 minutes) conceived and written by James G. March, produced and directed by Steven C. Schecter. Schecter Films (in association with the Yale School of Management and the Copenhagen business School), 2008.

== Bibliography: Poetry ==
- James G. March, Academic Notes. London: Poets' and Painters' Press, 1974.
- James G. March, Aged Wisconsin. London: Poets' and Painters' Press, 1977.
- James G. March, Pleasures of the Process, London: Poets' and Painters' Press, 1980.
- James G. March, Slow Learner. London: Poets' and Painters' Press, 1985.
- James G. March, Minor Memos. London: Poets' and Painters' Press, 1990.
- James G. March, Late Harvest. Palo Alto, CA: Bonde Press, 2000.
- James G. March, Footprints. Palo Alto, CA: Bonde Press, 2005.
- James G. March, Quiet Corners. Palo Alto, CA: Bonde Press, 2008.
- James G. March, Small Steps. Palo Alto, CA: Bonde Press, 2010.
- James G. March, A Collection of Words. Palo Alto, CA: Bonde Press, 2011.
- James G. March, Fermented Fruit. Palo Alto, CA: Bonde Press, 2013.
