= Daniel Béland (sociologist) =

Canadian political sociologist

Daniel Béland is a Canadian political sociologist, currently Director of the McGill Institute for the Study of Canada and James McGill Professor in the Department of Political Science at McGill University.
