= John W. Kingdon =

American political scientist (b. 1940)

John Wells Kingdon
- Born: 1940 (age 85–86)
- Occupation: Political theorist
- Known for: Agendas, Alternatives, and Public Policies; America the Unusual; Policy streams framework
- Awards: American Academy of Arts and Sciences Fellow; Guggenheim fellow

Academic background
- Education: Oberlin College; University of Wisconsin–Madison

Academic work
- Era: Contemporary
- Discipline: Political Science
- Institutions: University of Michigan; Center for Advanced Behavioral Studies at Stanford; Brookings Institution

John Wells Kingdon (born 1940) is professor emeritus and was Acting Chair of Political Science (1989–1990 when the chair, Jack L. Walker, was on leave) at the University of Michigan. He is a graduate of Oberlin College and the University of Wisconsin–Madison. He is a fellow of the American Academy of Arts and Sciences and was a Guggenheim fellow. He resides in Ann Arbor, Michigan. He is also a fellow at the Center for Advanced Behavioral Studies at Stanford. He served as Chair of the Department of Political Science at the University of Michigan and as President of the Midwest Political Science Association, and has often been a Guest Scholar at the Brookings Institution.

== Scholarly influence ==
Kingdon is a specialist in American politics, and has written influential books such as Agendas, Alternatives, and Public Policies, and America the Unusual. Despite critiques of his work being theoretically shaky, the work has retained a prominent place in the policy literature, garnering hundreds of citations since its publication.

== Core ideas ==
Kingdon argues that the structure of American political institutions, especially Congress, encourages fragmentation and splintering in American national governance. He also believes this occurs more in the United States than elsewhere.

=== Multiple Streams Analysis ===
In his book Agendas, Alternatives and Public Policies he proposed that for an issue to get on the political agenda, three flux must encounter:

- The problem;
- The solution;
- The political will.

Effectively, if there is no solution to a problem, it would be impossible to get the political attention. There can be a wonderful idea in the air, but if this is not answering any prominent problem, no political attention will be raised. Finally, there can be a political will to solve a problem, but if no solution is available, nothing will happen. Political will comes from both predictable elements such as post-elections and unpredictable ones like natural disasters. The three flux must encounter in order to get the political attention to use an available solution to solve an existing problem. Individual policy entrepreneurs are needed to build acceptance for solutions and to create couplings between these streams of problems, solutions, and political will.

=== America the Unusual ===
In his book, America the Unusual, Kingdon states that both American institutions and American ideologies are a source of explanation for why the United States differs in its public policy from other Westernized democracies. For example, the United States' relatively small public sector is partially due to the government's restraints placed upon it in the Constitution, but also partially due to Americans' sustained preference for having a limited government. Kingdon stresses the historical consequences of both American institutions and American ideology, and that they have resulted in American citizens persistently holding a "right of center" position regarding the desired size of the federal government, compared to other developed nations. Kingdon concludes in America the Unusual that United States' lawmakers need to abandon public policy creation beginning with ideology—favoring the use of political pragmatism instead. Creation of new public laws, or edits to the federal budget due to ideological motivations, such as individualism, will be ineffective to combat rising issues such as climate change and population growth in the coming decades, Kingdon argues.

== See also ==
- Harold Lasswell
