= Organization Science (journal) =

Peer-reviewed academic journal

- Discipline: Management
- Language: English
- Edited by: Lamar Pierce

Publication details
- History: 1990-present
- Publisher: Institute for Operations Research and the Management Sciences
- Frequency: Bimonthly
- Impact factor: 4.9 (2023)

Standard abbreviations
- ISO 4: Organ. Sci.

Indexing
- CODEN: ORSCEZ
- ISSN: 1047-7039 (print); 1526-5455 (web)
- LCCN: 90649327
- OCLC no.: 461593471

Links
- Journal homepage; Online access; Online archive

Organization Science is a bimonthly peer-reviewed academic journal published by the Institute for Operations Research and the Management Sciences. It covers research on the dynamics of organizations. In 2012, it was one of the four general-management journals listed by the University of Texas at Dallas when ranking universities by research. In 2016, the journal was ranked on the Financial Times top 45 list. The editor-in-chief is Lamar Pierce (Washington University in St. Louis). According to the Journal Citation Reports, the journal has a 2023 impact factor of 4.9.
