= Organizational storytelling =

Study of use of narrative in organizations

Organizational storytelling (also known as business storytelling) is a concept in management and organization studies concerned with the role of narrative and story in organizational life. It examines how stories are created, circulated, and used within organizations to communicate values, manage meaning, transmit knowledge, negotiate identity, exercise power, and make sense of events. The field draws on communication theory, sociology, literary theory, and organization studies.

== History and development ==
Interest in stories and narratives as organizational phenomena emerged from the organizational culture research of the 1980s. Early studies examined how organizational stories conveyed culture, norms, and values to members. Boje (1991) published a foundational empirical study of storytelling performance in an office supply firm in the Administrative Science Quarterly, documenting how employees collaboratively produce abbreviated, allusive story fragments rather than polished narratives — a "terse style" of organizational storytelling shaped by shared context.

Karl Weick's work on sensemaking contributed to the theoretical development of organizational storytelling, establishing the central role of narrative in how organizations retrospectively make sense of events. Barbara Czarniawska applied narrative theory and dramatism to the study of organizational identity, examining how institutions narrate themselves into existence. Yiannis Gabriel developed a psychoanalytically informed approach to organizational stories, distinguishing between managed information and unmanaged stories as sites of fantasy, desire, and resistance.

In the 2000s the field expanded in multiple directions. Practitioner-oriented work focused on leadership communication and knowledge management, examining how storytelling could be deployed strategically in organizations. Academic research explored storytelling in relation to organizational change, organizational identity, discourse analysis, cross-cultural management, and critical management studies.

== Theoretical perspectives ==
Giroux and Marroquin (2005) identified five perspectives in the academic literature on organizational storytelling:

=== Functionalist perspective ===
The functionalist perspective treats storytelling as a management tool for top-down communication. It focuses on the efficiency of narrative transmission, emphasizing brevity and consistency with organizational objectives. Stories in this perspective serve to align employee behavior with strategic goals. Strategic ambiguity — deliberate vagueness in communication — is recognized as a sometimes intentional feature rather than a failure of transmission.

=== Interpretive perspective ===
The interpretive perspective treats the organization as a socially constructed, subjective universe accessible to researchers through the stories actors tell. Narratives carry both the central values of an organization and the contradictions, conflicts, and differences that official accounts suppress. Barbara Czarniawska's institutional narrative approach combines insights from anthropology, literary theory, and institutionalism to examine how organizations produce and circulate stories about themselves. Antenarrative theory, developed by Boje (2001), extends the interpretive perspective by attending to the fragmented, pre-narrative stories — the "living stories" — that circulate before they congeal into institutionally endorsed narrative accounts.

=== Process perspective ===
The process perspective, drawing on the work of Karl Weick, treats the organization not as a fixed entity but as an ongoing organizing process. Storytelling is central to this process because narrative is the primary means by which actors engage in sensemaking — making retrospective sense of equivocal events. Researchers in this tradition study stories in situations of organizational change, controversy, or crisis, and examine the "narrative intelligence" of organizational actors. Sensemaking processes are understood as inherently retrospective: actors construct plausible accounts of what has happened rather than discovering pre-existing facts.

=== Critical perspective ===
The critical perspective examines how storytelling operates in asymmetrical power relations within organizations. Dominant organizational narratives can function to "create a culture of submission", naturalizing particular distributions of power and silencing alternative voices. The critical feminist perspective within this tradition focuses on how gender differences are created, sustained, and challenged through narrative in organizational settings.

=== Postmodern perspective ===
The postmodern perspective treats both society and organization as fragmented and discursively constructed. It foregrounds textuality and promotes the polyphony of voices within and around organizations, emphasizing that no single narrative can claim to represent organizational reality. Researchers in this tradition give voice to marginalized employees and attend to the contradictions and silences in official organizational accounts. The postmodern perspective is associated with Boje's (1995) analysis of Disney as a "Tamara-land" of simultaneous, competing organizational stories.

== Key concepts ==
=== Narrative and story ===
Organizational storytelling research distinguishes between narrative — a retrospective, coherent account with a beginning, middle, and end — and story — a more immediate, embodied, and often fragmentary account of lived experience. This distinction informs debates about how organizations convert experience into shareable knowledge. Gabriel (2000) further distinguishes managed narratives (official accounts shaped by organizational interests) from unmanaged stories (informal accounts that preserve ambiguity, fantasy, and dissent).

=== Sensemaking ===
Weick's sensemaking theory holds that organizational actors do not discover meaning but actively construct it through narrative. Stories are the primary vehicle through which equivocal events are retrospectively ordered into plausible accounts. The sensemaking perspective is deeply influential in organizational storytelling research and informs both the process and interpretive traditions.

=== Antenarrative ===
Antenarrative, a term coined by Boje (2001), refers to the fragmented, prospective story bets that precede and shape retrospective narrative. Where sensemaking emphasizes retrospective coherence, antenarrative attends to the forward-looking, pre-narrative story fragments — "bets on the future" — that orient organizational actors before events are resolved into official accounts. The concept has been applied in organizational studies, technical communication, entrepreneurship research, and other fields.

=== Tamara-land ===
The concept of Tamara-land was introduced by Boje (1995) as a metaphor for the polyphonic, multi-story nature of organizational life, drawing directly on John Krizanc's 1981 immersive theatrical work Tamara (play). In Krizanc's play, audience members move through multiple rooms of a large house, each containing simultaneously unfolding scenes; each audience member can only follow some characters, so different spectators experience entirely different versions of the same events. Boje applied this structure to organizational storytelling: in any organization, many stories are being performed simultaneously in different departments, boardrooms, and hallways, and no single actor — employee, manager, or researcher — can follow them all. The organization is therefore a Tamara-land, a dispersed narrative environment in which coherent "master" narratives are always partial constructions that suppress the polyphony of simultaneously circulating stories.

Boje conducted an interview with Krizanc about the organizational implications of the play's structure, published in Tamara: Journal for Critical Organization Inquiry.

=== Storytelling organization ===
Boje (1991) introduced the concept of the storytelling organization to describe organizations in which storytelling is the central form of collective memory and communication. Organizational stories in this view are not polished products but ongoing, collaborative, and contested performances.

== Applications ==
=== Knowledge management ===
Stories are recognized as an important vehicle for transmitting tacit knowledge within organizations. Unlike explicit, codified knowledge, tacit knowledge — practical know-how, social judgment, institutional memory — is difficult to transfer through formal documentation but flows readily through story and anecdote.

=== Leadership communication ===
Organizational storytelling has been widely adopted in leadership development and strategic communication. Leaders who employ storytelling are better able to convey vision, generate emotional commitment, and inspire action across organizational levels. The "springboard story" — a narrative that enables listeners to leap imaginatively to possibilities — is one widely discussed device in leadership storytelling practice.

=== Organizational change ===
In situations of organizational change, stories serve as resources for both resistance and legitimation. Dominant organizational narratives can frame change as inevitable or desirable, while counter-narratives circulate among employees to contest official accounts.

=== Marketing and branding ===
In marketing and brand management, organizational storytelling has been applied to the construction of brand identity and consumer engagement. Stories that communicate brand values and heritage are more memorable and persuasive than informational advertising.

== Academic journals ==
Organizational storytelling research appears across several peer-reviewed journals:

- Administrative Science Quarterly — published Boje's (1991) foundational study of the storytelling organization
- Academy of Management Journal and Academy of Management Annals — key venues for organizational narrative and storytelling research
- Organization Science — published Vaara and Tienari's (2011) antenarrative study of cross-border mergers
- Human Relations — publishes research on narrative, sensemaking, and organizational identity
- Organization Studies — key European venue for narrative and interpretive organization research
- Communication Monographs — publishes communication-oriented storytelling research
- Tamara: Journal for Critical Organization Inquiry — a journal dedicated to postmodern and storytelling approaches to organization studies, drawing its name from Krizanc's 1981 play

== Key scholars ==
Several scholars have been central to the academic development of organizational storytelling:

- David Boje — organizational storytelling, antenarrative, storytelling organization theory
- Barbara Czarniawska — narrative approaches to institutional identity and organization studies
- Yiannis Gabriel — psychoanalytic and literary approaches to organizational stories
- Karl Weick — sensemaking theory and its relationship to organizational narrative
- Steve Denning — practitioner-oriented work on leadership storytelling and knowledge management

== See also ==
- Narrative paradigm
- Sensemaking
- Antenarrative
- Tamara (play)
- John Krizanc
- Organizational culture
- Knowledge management
- Discourse analysis
- Narrative inquiry
- Barbara Czarniawska
- Yiannis Gabriel
- Karl Weick
