= Peter Klein (impresario) =

American impresario (born 1945)

- Born: July 22, 1945 (age 81); Transylvania, Romania
- Citizenship: United States
- Occupations: Impresario, president of Living Arts, Inc.
- Years active: 1970–present
- Notable work: Touring of George Gershwin's Porgy and Bess worldwide (since January 1993)
- Website: www.peterkleinyc.com

Peter Klein is an American impresario who brought several American theatrical productions to Europe and arranged the first US tour of La Scala Ballet in 1986. He is best known for touring George Gershwin's Porgy and Bess around the globe since 1993.

== Early life ==
Peter Klein was born on July 22, 1945 in Romania, his parents were Hungarian Jews, who survived the Holocaust. Growing up in communist Romania he learned Hungarian, Romanian, Russian, German, French and English. In 1963 the family moved to Israel, where Klein learned Hebrew. In 1967 Klein traveled to Europe and eventually to New York, where he met legendary impresario Sol Hurok and started working for him as North American tour manager in 1969. He was the tour manager for Andrés Segovia and Arthur Rubinstein. Klein established his own production company, Living Arts, Inc., in 1972.

== Career ==
=== 1970s ===
In 1977 Klein brought American Ballet Theatre, including Mikhail Baryshnikov, Gelsey Kirkland, Martine van Hamel, Ivan Nagy and Natalia Makarova to open Nervi International Ballet Festival in Genoa with Twyla Tharp’s Push Comes to Shove and La Bayadère. In 1977 he also produced the first U.S. and Canada tour of the Israel Ballet. In March 1979 Klein curated Andrés Segovia's concert at the White House as part of the initiatives promoted by PBS. In the same year, Klein toured the Boston Ballet in Europe for the first time, opening Nervi Festival.

=== 1980s ===
Klein managed Boston Ballet European tours in 1981 and 1983. There was also a controversy around 1981 South African tour that had to be cancelled because of apartheid rules that could hurt principal dancer Augustus Van Heerden and other team members.

Throughout the 80s he brought several American musicals to Europe for the first time including Gladys Nederlander’s production of West Side Story with David Stahl as conductor (1981), Hair (1984) A Chorus Line (1986), Liz Swados’ Esther, a Vaudeville Megillah (1988) and Mama, I Want to Sing! (1989). In 1989 he produced a stage show Good Luck! based on popular TV series Fame with Gene Anthony Ray for Italy.

Klein produced two American tours, one for La Scala Ballet and one for Les Ballets de Monte Carlo. The 1986 La Scala tour was the first ever tour of a major Italian dance company to the US, with Franco Zeffirelli’s staging of Swan Lake and the 1987 tour of Les Ballets de Monte Carlo. It was their first US tour since 1917. The company presented Les Sylphides, Le Corsaire, La fille mal gardée, The Prodigal Son and Prince Igor.

=== 1990s ===
In 1990 Klein brought John Krizanc’s Tamara play to Italy. This immersive, interactive play about Tamara de Lempicka and eccentric Italian poet Gabriele d'Annunzio was first staged in Rome at Villa Brasini and then in Cernobbio (Como) at Villa Erba. In 1992, he arranged the tour of Pittsburgh Ballet Theatre to Taipei, Taiwan.

During the 90s, Klein toured the world with his Opera Nazionale Italiana company featuring stars of Italian opera. He arranged tours to Spain and Mexico in 1991 and to US and Canada several times between 1992 and 2000.

The American 1992 tour opened with Verdi’s Rigoletto with the accompaniment of the Hungarian State Opera Orchestra. Opera Nazionale Italiana toured the US again in 1998 with Mascagni's Cavalleria Rusticana and Leoncavallo's I Pagliacci and Verdi’s Otello in 1999. Klein took Opera Nazionale Italiana to Portugal with Rigoletto in 1999.

In 1992 Klein brought Joffrey Ballet to Torino and Palermo and in 1993 to Germany. In 1995, he brought Harlem Gospel to the Belem Opera House in Lisbon.

=== 2000s ===
To commemorate the Verdi centennial in 2001, Klein produced and toured Viva Verdi! show with partner Particia Murray-Bett in the United Kingdom and Ireland featuring excerpts from Nabucco, Rigoletto, Il Trovatore and other Verdi operas.

In 2002, Klein brought West Side Story to Italy again in 2002 performing in Ravenna, Palermo and Pistoia. In 2002 he arranged the Arad Philharmonic of Romania to a US and Canada tour, Maestro Dorin Frandes conducting.

In 2003, Klein arranged the US tour for the Polish Philharmonic of Resovia with pianist Leopold Godowsky III, nephew of George Gershwin and grandson of the legendary pianist-composer Leopold Godowsky as the guest star at the Polish Cultural Institute in New York. The following year he brought Broadway Tonite show to Warsaw, Poland. In 2007, he presented Liza Minnelli at the Roman amphitheater in Taormina, Italy.

=== 2010s ===
In June 2010, Klein staged an opera flash mob at the S. Ambrogio Market in Florence with professional opera singers performing arias from Verdi’s La traviata and Bizet’s Carmen.

In 2011 he produced Ain't Misbehavin' musical directed by Richard Maltby and within 2 years toured Turkey, France, Germany, Italy, Greece, Spain, Israel, and Hungary.

In 2013, Klein started to work with the Spanish contemporary flamenco dance company Los Vivancos taking its Aeternum show with the Hungarian all-female band Maszka Band to London and Budapest. He also arranged Los Vivancos performance at the Beijing 2014 BTV Global Spring Festival TV show. Also in August 2014 together with Patricia Murray-Bett he produced Los Vivancos concert at the Jersey Opera House.

In 2017 Klein brought the winners of Hungarian Virtuosi show to New York's Weill Recital Hall at Carnegie Hall.

=== Porgy and Bess ===
Peter Klein started to consider staging his own production of Porgy and Bess in 1991 when his Argentinian colleague asked him to bring the opera to Teatro Colón in Buenos Aires. In 1992 he brought the existing production of the Virginia Opera company to an 18-performance tour of Latin America in April and May, with 9 performances at Teatro Colon. Klein’s own production started touring US and Canada in January 1993. In the 90s it was also known as the Charleston production as it debuted in Charleston and performed with the Charleston Symphony Orchestra (David Stahl, conductor).

The concept of the touring production was approved by George Gershwin’s heirs. Leopold Godowsky III, the nephew of George Gershwin, helped Klein to develop the concept of the touring version with shorter performance time and reduced number of musicians. The original cast had three pairs of lead actors: Brian Gibson and Elizabeth Graham, Andre Solomon-Glover and Vanessa Stewart, William Marshall and Claudette McCargo.

Peter Klein’s Living Arts production of Porgy and Bess was presented in 23 countries including the UK (1997, 1999), Australia and New Zealand (1997, 2006), Egypt (2000), China (2001), Portugal (2003) and Estonia (2008). It has toured the US multiple times.
