= Antenarrative =

Antenarrative is the process by which retrospective narrative is linked to living story. For example, antenarrative bets on the future, which are things one imagines may come into being even if that imagination is not fully formed, draw on aspects of the past, those experiences someone has lived through, to form a coherent narrative, a telling with a beginning middle and end. In antenarrative theory the many ends of a narrative come first, then the elements of the past come next, leading to the creation of a narrative. Where causal logic in the hard sciences says the past leads to the present which results in the future; this reverses the temporal logic of causality, where many potential futures draw on different aspects of the past to generate narratives in the present. This is because antenarrative shifts the perspective taken when asking "why?" Where Causation in the physical sciences answers why with physical properties; antenarrative reorients why to embrace human intentionality, imagination, and agency.

While aspects of this process have been studied by other disciplines under other names for centuries, the term "antenarrative", coined by David Boje in 2001, has four primary uses. The first two uses of antenarrative are as the before(ante)-narrative, existing as story is turned to narrative, and a bet (ante) narrative, placed in hopes that something will become a retrospective narrative. The other two uses are spiral and rhizome antenarratives.

Research in the journal, Organization Science, has recently found a number of nationally oriented antenarratives that are utilized in cross border mergers and acquisitions. Other scholars that have utilized antenarrative include Barge 2004; Collins & Rainwater, 2005; Durant, Gardner & Taylor, 2006; Vickers, 2005; Yolles, 2007; Grow 2009.

== Pre/bet antenarratives ==
The antenarrative is pre-narrative, a bet that a fragmented polyphonic story will make retrospective, narrative, sense in the future. In a recent description of the bet aspect of antenarrative Karl Weick has said "To talk about antenarrative as a bet is also to invoke an important structure in sense-making; namely, the presumption of logic (Meyer, 1956). ‘Without faith in the purpose- fulness of, and rationality of art, listeners would abandon their attempts to understand, to reconcile deviants to what has gone before or to look for their raison d’être in what is still to come’ (1956: 75).". Antenarratives serve a similar purpose. The process of moving from the nebulous and chaotic story to a narrative with a beginning middle and end is the antenarrative faith that story fragments will make retrospective sense some time in the future.

== Spiral ==
Spiral antenarrative goes beyond linear and cybernetic, closed signal loop, systems. Instead it utilizes the dialogic relation between deviation-amplification and deviation counteraction to show dynamically changing meanings. This is where antenarrative participates with heteroglossia. As David Boje says "This is a connection between more immediate-emergence-sensemaking and a prospective-sensemaking that anticipated a possible future by enacting particular sorts of actions of caring and in-Being involved, for a while, iteratively." Spirals are like circles except in that the variability of the trajectory is, itself, dissymmetrical Meaning that, unlike cycles, that which is part of the new spiral may be made up of, and utilize things unrelated to, the previous iteration.

== Rhizomatic assemblage ==
Rhizomatic/assemblage antenarrative is the antenarrative process that is not theoretically causal, but rather combinatorial. It builds on the theoretical tradition of qualia which allows for assemblages of interacting processes. When a narrative is forming but still maintains a level of ambiguity regarding the multiple linear potentials, all of which interact during the formation, then the antenarrative is rhizomatic. As David Boje has said: from a storytelling method standpoint, "an assemblage (rhizome) has visible runners and invisible roots that connect agents (usually people, but also animals, and the fire of the forge) with actants (usually material things, such as the iron, the carbon, the subatomic stuff). Agents and actants, people and things, are networked together by their runners and rooting connectivity." This shows a kind of rhizome-ontology that can be found amongst various actors and actants.

== See also ==
- Storytelling
- Narrative Therapy
- Augmented Cognition or Intelligence Amplification
- Organizational Storytelling
- David Boje
- Narrative
