= Organizational information theory =

Communication theory

Organizational Information Theory (OIT) is a communication theory, developed by Karl Weick, offering systemic insight into the processing and exchange of information within organizations and among its members. Unlike the past structure-centered theory, OIT focuses on the process of organizing in dynamic, information-rich environments. Given that, it contends that the main activity of organizations is the process of making sense of equivocal information. Organizational members are instrumental to reduce equivocality and achieve sensemaking through some strategies — enactment, selection, and retention of information. With a framework that is interdisciplinary in nature, organizational information theory's desire to eliminate both ambiguity and complexity from workplace messaging builds upon earlier findings from general systems theory and phenomenology.

== Inspiration and influence of pre-existing theories ==
1. General Systems Theory

The General Systems Theory, on its most basic premise, describes the phenomenon of a cohesive group of interrelated parts. When one part of the system is changed or affected, it will affect the system as a whole. Weick uses this theoretical framework from 1950 to influence his organizational information theory. Likewise, organizations can be viewed as a system of related parts that work together towards a common goal or vision. Applying this to Weick's organizational information theory, organizations must work to reduce ambiguity and complexity in the workplace to maximize cohesiveness and efficiency. Weick uses the term, coupling, to describe how organizations, like a system, can be composed of interrelated and dependent parts. Coupling looks at the relationship between people and work.

There are two types of coupling:

1. Loose coupling

Loose coupling describes that while people within the organization or system are connected and often work together, they do not depend on one another to continue or fully complete individual work. The dependencies are weak and workflow is flexible. For example, "if the whole Science department completely shuts down because all of teachers are sick or for whatsoever reason, the school can still continue to operate because other departments are still present."

2. Tight coupling

Tight coupling describes when connections within an organization are strong and dependent. If one part of the organization is not operating correctly, the organization as a whole cannot continue to their fullest potential. " For instance, the format and ink section completely shuts down hence the succeeding steps cannot be continued, so the whole process of the organization will be dropped. Thus, components of a system are directly dependent on one another."

2. Theory of evolution

The theory of evolution, by Charles Darwin, is a framework for survival of the fittest. According to Darwin, organisms attempt to adapt and live in an unforgiving environment. Those that are unsuccessful in adaptation do not survive, while the strong organisms continue to thrive and reproduce. Weick invokes inspiration from Darwin, to incorporate a biological perspective to his theory. It is natural for organizations to have to adapt to incoming information that often interfere with the preexisting environment. Organizations that are able to plan and alter strategies in accordance with their constant need of organizing and sense making, will survive and be the most successful. However, there is a notable difference between animal evolution and survival of the fittest in organizations, "A given animal is what it is; variation comes through mutation. But the nature of an organization can change when its members alter their behavior."

== Assumptions ==
1. Human organizations exist in an information environment

Unlike senders and receivers models, OIT stands on the situational perspective. Karl Weick views a human organization as an open social system. People in that system develop a mechanism to establish goals, obtain and process information, or perceive the environment. In this process, people and the environment come to conclusions on "what's going on here?". Colville believes that this attributional process is retrospective.

Take an education institution as an example. A university can obtain information regarding students' needs in numerous ways. It might create feedback section in its website. It could organize alumni panels or academic affairs to attract prospective students and collect concrete questions they are interested in. It may also conduct the survey or host focus group to get the information. After that, the staff of the university have to decide how to deal with these information, based on which, it has to set and accomplish its goals for current and prospective students.

2. The information an organization receives differs in terms of equivocality

Weick posits that numerous feasible interpretations of reality exist when organizations process information. Their varying levels of understandability lead to different outcomes of information inputs. In other academic works, scholars tend to say that messages are uncertain or ambiguous. While according to OIT, messages are described to be equivocal. believes that people proactively exclude a number of possibilities to perceive what is going on in the environment. Due to OIT's situational perspective, the meanings of messages consist of the messages, the interpretations of receivers, and the interactional context. However, ambiguity and uncertainty can mean that a standard answer - the only one true objective interpretation - exists.

Also, Weick emphasizes that "the equivocality is the engine that motivates people to organize". Maitlis and Christianson states that the equivocality trigger sensemaking for three reasons: environment jolts and organizational crises, threats to identity, and planned change interventions.

3. Human organizations engage in information processing to reduce equivocality of information

Based upon the first two assumption, OIT proposes that information processing within organizations is a social activity. Sharing is the key feature of organizational information processing. In that particular context, members jointly make sense the reality by reducing equivocality. It other words, the sensemaking is a joint responsibility which includes numerous interdependent people to accomplish. In this process, organizations and its members combine actions and attributions together in order to find the balance between the complexity of thoughts and the simplicity of actions. Weick also proposes that people create their own environment though enactment, which is the action of making sense. This is because people have different perceptual schemas and selective perception, so people create different information environments. In creating different information environments, people can arrive at the same or close to the same understanding or solution through different thought processes and overall understanding.

== Key concepts ==
=== The organization ===
In order to place Weick's vision regarding Organizational Information Theory into proper working context, exploring his view regarding what constitutes the organization and how its individuals embody that construct might yield significant insights.

From a fundamental standpoint, he shared a belief that organizational validation is derived---not through bricks and mortar, or locale—but from a series of events which enable entities to "collect, manage and use the information they receive." In elaborating further on what constitutes an organization during early writings outlining OIT, Weick said, "The word organization is a noun and it is also a myth. if one looks for an organization, one will not find it. What will be found is that there are events linked together, that transpire within concrete walls and these sequences, their pathways, their timing, are the forms we erroneously make into substances when we talk about an organization".

When viewed in this modular fashion, the organization meets Weick's theoretical vision by encompassing parameters that are less bound by concrete, wood, and structural restraints and more by an ability to serve as a repository where information can be consistently and effectively channeled. Taking these defining characteristics into account, proper channel execution relies on maximization of messaging clarity, context, delivery and evolution through any system.

One example as to how these interactions might unfold on a more granular level within these confines can be gleaned through Weick's double interact loop, which he considers the "building blocks of every organization". Simply put, double interacts describe interpersonal exchanges that, inherently, occur across the organizational chain of command and in life, itself.

Thus:

"An act occurs when you say something (Can I have a Popsicle?).

An interact occurs when you say something and I respond ("No, it will spoil your dinner).

A double interact occurs when you say something, I respond to that, then you respond to that, adjusting the first statement ("Well, how about half a Popsicle?)

Weick envisions the organization as a system taking in equivocal information from its environment, trying to make sense of that information, and using what was learned for the future. As such, organizations evolve as they make sense out of themselves and the environment".

"These communication cycles are the reason Weick focuses more on relationships within an organization than he does on an individual's talent or performance. He believes that many outside consultants gloss over the importance of the double interact because they depart the scene before the effects of their recommended action bounce back to affect the actor". By allowing us to consider the organization in this alternative framework, Organizational Information Theory provides us with a robust platform from which to explore the communication process, literally, as it unfolds.

The flow of equivocal information for organizations is constant and ongoing. Organizing, the process of making sense out of information, is a continuous cycle for organizations. Because of this, Weick prefers to use verbs when describing organizations. Nouns give off a stationary and fixed connotation. For example, instead of the word "management", Weick would prefer to use the verb "managing". By using verbs, it advocates and reflects the fluidity of the sensemaking process, which is changing, as opposed to using nouns; as nouns reflect stationary or fixed entities, which is against what Weick is proposing.

=== Loose coupling and the information environment ===
In developing Organizational Information Theory, Weick took a "social psychological stance that notes that individual behavior is more a function of the situation than of personal traits or role definitions. Therefore, people are 'loosely connected' in most organizations and have a large latitude for action". As a way of formalizing this phenomenon, he "invites us to use the metaphor "loose coupling" in order to better understand organizations and aspects of organizations --particularly the variant kinds of connections that exist within organizations--that are either marginalized, ignored, or suppressed by normative bureaucracy".

So, in much the same way he suggested that organizations be viewed through a non-traditional lens in structure, he acknowledges that, by doing so, one may have to consider circumstances where "several means can produce the same result, while offering the appearance that lack of coordination, absence of regulations, and very slow feedback times are the norm".

While many might view these nuances as roadblocks or impediments to progress, Organizational Information Theory views each one as a catalyst for improved performance and positive change through: "increased sensitivity to a shifting environment, room for adaptation and creative solutions to develop, sub-system breakdown without damaging the entire organization, persistence through rapid environmental fluctuations and fostering an attitude where self-determination by the actors is key".

Another overriding component of Weick's approach is that information afforded by the organization's environment---including the culture within the organizational environment itself---can impact the behaviors and interpretation of behaviors of those within the organization. Thus, creation of organizational knowledge is impacted by each person's personal schema as well as the backdrop of the organization's objectives. The organization must sift through the available information to filter out the valuable from the extraneous. Additionally, the organization must both interpret the information and coordinate that information to "make it meaningful for the members of the organization and its goals." In order to construct meaning from these messages in their environment, the organization must reduce equivocality, while committing to an interpretation of the message which matches its culture and overall mission.

Accordingly, the "flashlight analogy" is used to explain the inseparability of action and knowledge present in this theory. One should imagine he is in a dark field at night with only a flashlight. He can vaguely pick out objects around him, but can't really tell what they are. Is that lump in the distance a bush or a dangerous animal? When he turns on his flashlight, however, he creates a circle of light that allows him to see clearly and act with relative clarity. The act of turning on the flashlight effectively created a new environment that allowed him to interpret the world around him. There is still only a single circle of light, though, and what remains outside that circle is still just as mysterious, unless the flashlight is redirected. With organizational information theory, the flashlight is mental. The environment is located in the mind of the actor and is imposed on him by his experiences, which makes them more meaningful.

=== Equivocality ===
Based on the number of rapidly moving parts within any organization (i.e., information flows, individuals, etc....) the foundation upon which messaging is received constantly shifts, thus leaving room for unintended consequences relative to true intent and meaning. Equivocality arises when communication outreach "can be given different interpretations because their substance is ambiguous, conflicted, obscure, or introduces uncertainty into a situation".

Organizational Information Theory provides a knowledge base and framework which can help mitigate these risks through by decreasing the level of ambiguity present during relevant communication activities. Simultaneously, it serves as a construct whose potential for growth stems from active use "communicating and organizing" and "reducing the amount of equivocality" within a specified domain.

In looking at how equivocality evolves more closely, it can also manifest itself as a signature for highly interpretive events, along with those where the parameters (and uncertainty levels) are, traditionally, much more concrete. For instance, "equivocality also describes situations where there is agreement on a set of descriptive criteria (say, desirable market/undesirable market) but disagreement on either their boundaries (i.e., the point at which markets go from being desirable to undesirable) or on their application to a particular situation (whether a particular market is desirable or undesirable). Managing equivocality requires coordinating meaning among members of an organization, and is an essential part of organizing. Equivocality arises because everyone's experiences are unique; individuals and communities develop their own sets of values and beliefs and tend to interpret events differently. Equivocality also may result from unreliable or conflicting information sources, noisy communication channels, differing or ambiguous goals and preferences, vague roles and responsibilities, or disparate political interests".

=== Sensemaking ===
Karl Weick's Organizational Information Theory views organizations as " 'sensemaking systems' which incessantly create and re-create conceptions of themselves and of all around them".

From a less clinical (and more intuitive) perspective, Weick and his collaborator, Kathleen M. Sutcliffe, jointly describe sensemaking as an action which "involves turning circumstances into a situation that is comprehended explicitly in words or speech and that serves as a springboard to action".

In its more defined organizational context, sensemaking can be looked at as a process "that is applied to both individuals and groups who are faced with new information that is inconsistent with their prior beliefs". In factoring the uneasiness (or cognitive dissonance) that results from this experience, they will create narratives to fit the story which serve both as a buffer and a guiding light for further renditions of the story. "This explains how, for example, religious groups can have such stringent beliefs, how political parties can be confident in their diametrically-opposed positions, how organizations can develop very different cultures, and how individuals can develop very different interpretations for the same event".

The process of sensemaking usually starts with a circumstance or problem which requires a certain level of interpretation by others (i.e., something did or did not happen). Whether it is consciously or unconsciously driven, those involved then make a commitment to a perceived viewpoint surrounding those facts. "Commitment forms around the interpretation to bind the interpretation to future action. When publicly communicated, commitment is especially strong. Individuals are motivated to justify their commitments, so they initiate future actions and continually refine their interpretation of the original event so that their commitment to a course of action is deemed appropriate. These new actions produce "evidence" that validates the interpretation and are used to increase decision confidence".

These are critical facets which surround the sensemaking process:

a) sensemaking starts with noticing and bracketing

b) sensemaking is about labeling

c) sensemaking is retrospective

d) sensemaking is about presumption

e) sensemaking is social and systemic

f) sensemaking is about action

g) sensemaking is about organizing through communication

The idea of sensemaking is also a theme within Organizational Information Theory. Organizational sensemaking contrasts with organizational interpretation. When an organization interprets information, there is already a frame of reference in place and this is enough information for an organization to change course. Sensemaking occurs, however, when no initial frame of reference exists and no obvious connection presents itself. According to Weick, sensemaking can be driven by beliefs or actions. Beliefs shape what people experience and give form for the actions they take. For example, disagreement about beliefs in an organization can lead to arguments. This is a form of sensemaking.

Notably, sensemaking make impact on organizations in three aspects: strategic change, organizational learning, and innovation and creativity. Regarding strategic change, individuals are triggered to alter their own roles and behaviors and also help others to coordinate with their new changes. Then a new organizational order about strategies will be constructed. As for learning, on the one hand, people will learn from error. Organizational understandings and routines will be revised, updated and strengthened in response to the errors. On the other hand, sensemaking about material gathered and available options make a great contribution to learn in more conventional contexts, especially in knowledge-intensive work settings. The details about its impact on innovation can be seen in "extension" section.

=== Choice points, behavior cycles and assembly rules ===
When information messaging remains an unclear variable, organizations will usually revert to a number of Organizational Information Theory-based methodologies which are designed to encourage ambiguity reduction:

1. Choice points--Describes an organization's decision to ask: "should we attend to some aspect of our environment that was rejected before?" Re-tracing one's steps can provide both management and individuals with a comfort zone in addressing frequency and volume regarding messaging, lest anything have been missed.

2. Behavior/communication cycles--Represents "deliberate communication activities on the part of an organization to decrease levels of ambiguity". Importantly, degrees of messaging equivocality have a direct impact on how many cycles are required to alleviate its effects. Within this realm, three distinct steps emerge that are each focused on providing messaging clarity: act, response and adjustment. Each is designed to facilitate the retention and selection process. Act occurs when it is communicated that unclear or equivocal information is present. Response is the effort to help reduce the uncertain information. Lastly, adjustment happens when the behavior or information evaluation is changed or adjusted. Many times, this cycle has to be repeated. This is because equivocal information and communication cycles have a positive correlation: The larger amount of complex information there is, the greater need for several communication cycles. Griffin et al. (2015) relates a communication cycle to a wet towel by saying, "just as a twist of a wet towel squeezes out water, each communication cycle squeezes equivocality out of the situation." Examples of behavior cycles include staff meetings, coffee-break rumoring, e-mail conversations, internal reports, etc..

3. Assembly rules--Signifies a broader construct, "which may include evaluating how standard operating procedures (SOP) are carried out, along with chain-of-command designations". By its nature, this approach explores protocol measures that might be effective in handling ambiguity, as well as, how related processes might unfold. These are rules that have served well in the past and have therefore become standard in the organization. Examples of assembly rules include a manual or handbook. Generally, assembly rules are used when the level of equivocal information is low.

== Strategies ==
=== The principles of equivocality ===
Three critical principles, or relationship, guide the process of equivocality reduction. They are: the relationship among equivocality, the rules and the cycles must be carefully analyzed; the relationship between the number of rules and amount of cycles; the relationship between the number of cycles and the amount of equivocality.

To be specific, Weick posits that the amount of perceived equivocality influence the number of rules. Generally speaking, there is a negative correlation between the level of equivocality and the amount of rules. To be specific, the more equivocal the message is, the few rules are available to process that information. Meanwhile, an inverse relationship also exists between rules and cycles. In other words, fewer rules lead to more use of cycles. Then, the increasing number of cycles used can reduce the equivocality. By using a higher number of cycles, this theory can be used as a rubric from which shared sensemaking can be accomplished in process organizing. This rubric sets the layout for how thought processes are changing and will be modified based on new information, different environments (work, social, living) and by the different people you are around and use assembly cycles with.

=== Stages of equivocality reduction ===
According to Weick, organizations experience continuous change and are ever-adapting, as opposed to a change followed by a period of stagnancy. Building off of Orlikowski's idea that the changes that take place are not necessarily planned, but rather inevitably occur over time, Organizational Information Theory explains how organizations use information found within the environment to interpret and adjust to change. In the event that the information available in the information environment is highly equivocal, the organization engages in a series of cycles that serve as a means to reduce uncertainty about the message. A highly equivocal message might require several iterations of the behavior cycles. An inverse relationship exists between the number of rules established by the organization to reduce equivocality and the number of cycles necessary to reduce equivocality. Similarly, the more cycles used, the less equivocality remains.

Enactment

Weick emphasizes the role of action, or enactment in change within an organization. Through a combination of individuals with existing data and external knowledge, and through iterative process of trial and error, ideas are refined until they become actualized. Enactment also plays a key role in the idea of sensemaking, the process by which people give meaning to experience. Essentially, the action helps to define the meaning, making those within the organization's environment responsible for the environment itself.

Selection

Upon analyzing the information the organization possesses, the selection stage includes evaluation of outstanding information necessary to further reduce equivocality. The organization must decide the best method for obtaining the remaining information. Generally, the decision-makers of the organization play a key role in this stage.

There are three critical processes happening in this stage: 1) members make a choice among interpretations; 2) members choose the type and amount of rules for processing those interpretations; 3) communication cycles start to work on those interpretations.

Retention

The final stage occurs when the organization sifts through the information it has compiled in attempts to adapt to change, and determines which information is beneficial and worth utilizing again. Inefficient, superfluous and otherwise unnecessary information that do not contribute to the completion of the project or reduction of equivocality will most likely not be retained for future application of similar project.

== Applications ==
=== Application in health care ===
One of the key real-world applications regarding Weick's concept of Organizational Information Theory can be found in healthcare. There, he went so far as to personally develop a dedicated health communications approach which "emphasizes the central role of communication and information processing within social groups and institutions". Specifically, Weick's work draws correlations between accuracy of information and the ability of organizations to adapt to change.

Weick's model of organizing plays a powerful role in improving communication of health care and health promotion. The OIT enables consumers and providers to reduce equivocality when they face complex health care and health promotion situations. "In health care and health promotion, enactment processes are used to make sense of different health-related challenges, selection processes are used to choose different courses of action in response to these challenges, and retention processes are used to preserve what was learned from enactment and selection processes for guiding future health care/promotion activities".

For instance, the theory can evaluate the problems of excessive nurse turnover in public hospital and develop interventions to address the problems. Hospital administrators used to deal with the problem by making efforts in recruiting nurses. Although the strategy attracted more new nurses, it was expensive to maintain the recruitment efforts. Thus, a retention program was generated under the Weick's model of organizing. The program used questionnaires, in-depth interviews and focus group discussion to figure out nurses' concerns (enactment). The research's results identified strategies to solve those problems (selection). Then the program gathered further information about nurses' attitude and advice for these strategies and implemented refined strategies (retention).

=== Application in education ===
Some scholars advocate that loosely coupled system and garbage can model guarantee the flexibility of higher education organizations. Proponents of loose coupling system believe that the university's academic freedom and students' individual identity will be destroyed if administrators tighten up the loose coupling. However, Weick argues that the "unpredictability (of an organization) is insufficient evidence for concluding that the elements in a system are loosely coupled". Other scholars notice the Weick's warning that loose coupling should not be used as a normative model. Universities will not lose their academic freedom with a tighter coupled system. Frank W. states that "They (universities) are tightly coupled in some aspects and uncoupled in other aspects. Tight coupling occurs when an issue supports the status quo. Uncoupling occurs when an issue challenges the status quo".

Weick's model of organizing can be applied to reduce equivocality in the large-lecture classroom and to increase students' engagement. Large-lecture classroom can be recognized as an information environment with various degrees of equivocality. Students enact assembly rules to make sense of messages in class with low equivocality. Behavior cycles which focus on act, response and adjustment can be utilized by students to clarify messages with high equivocality. "Students assess how the applied rules and cycles affected their ability to interpret the original input's equivocality and decide if additional rules and cycles are needed to develop an effective response to the input". Some students feel intimidated when they raise questions in the large-lecture classroom. Thus, the synchronicity and anonymous nature of microblog make itself a second channel to facilitate students' question asking as well as decreases their equivocality. Faculty enables to retain organizational intelligence through microblog format.

=== Application in conflict management ===
It is difficult to find two parties which share the exact same interest. Thus, conflict and cooperation coexist with each other in organizations. Institutionalized conflict management is frequently used by managers to create sustained organizations. Metaphors provides a comprehensive approach to understand and interpret the information environment which includes new knowledge and new practices. "Metaphor created by subsidiary representatives of the conflict management practice reflects the quality and the depth of institutionalization". Metaphors can be recognized as a collective sensemaking and a depict of organizational environment. Individuals are able to make decisions which depends on their metaphors about conflict in organizations.

== Critiques ==
=== Utility ===
This theory focuses on the process of communication instead of the role of individual actors. It examines the complexities of information processing in lieu of trying to understand people within a group or organization. Additionally, this theory closely examines the act of organizing, rather than organizations themselves. Weick defines organizing as, "the resolving of equivocality in an enacted environment by means of interlocked behaviors embedded in conditionally related process" and that, "human beings organize primarily to help them reduce the information uncertainty in their lives".

=== Logical consistency ===
Some scholars argue that this theory fails the test of logical consistency and that people are not necessarily guided by rules in an organization. Some organizational members might not have any interest in communication rules and their actions might have more to do with intuition than anything else.

Other critics posit that organizational information theory views the organization as a static entity, rather than one that changes over time. Dynamic adjustments, such as downsizing, outsourcing and even advancements in technology should be taken into consideration when examining an organization—and organizational information theory does not account for this.

Critics of this theory assert that it does not deal significantly with hierarchy or conflict, two prominent themes associated with organizational communications. In some cases, the hierarchical context makes difficulties for sensemaking and proposes a flow of downward negative feedback. Sensemaking process can be applied to explain why employees remain silence in the organization. Two sensemaking resources which are expectation and identity preclude employees from giving upward negative feedback. Employees expect that their negative feedback for supervisors will pose threat to their job security or might be neglected by supervisors. Besides, employees make sense of their own understanding and identify themselves as deficient experts who are unable to make best decisions.

=== Scope ===
The theory also neglects the larger social, historical and institutional context. The role of the institutional context and cultural-cognitive institutions in sensemaking should be paid more attention to. According to Taylor and Van Every, "what is missing [in Weick's 1995 Sensemaking in Organizations version of enactment] ... is an understanding of the organization as a communicational construction or an awareness of the institutionalizing of human society that accompanies organization with its many internal contradictions and tensions". Actors are constrained by cognition through socialization in the job, school system and the media when they do sensemaking in institutions. It causes less variety and more stability in institutions. In order to expand the theory, social mechanism can be applied to consider how institutions prime, edit and trigger sensemaking besides the traditional cognitive constraint.

== Extension of OIT ==
=== Dr. Brenda Dervin: the Sense-Making Approach ===
As an adjunct to Weick's work regarding organizational information, noted academician (and fellow researcher), Dr. Brenda Dervin, followed a similar path in exploring how ambiguity and uncertainty are handled across platforms.

However, in broaching these issues from a more communication-driven perspective Dr. Dervin found that these issues evolve from a different place; one, in fact, that unlike Weick, assumes "discontinuity between entities, times and spaces". Instead of modularity, "each individual is an entity moving through time and space, dealing with other entities which include other people, artifacts, systems, or institutions. The individual's making of sense as a strategy for bridging these gaps is the central metaphor of the Sense-Making Approach".

By utilizing this alternate prism, Dr. Dervin found that "patterns of gap-bridging behavior are better-predicted by the way individuals define the gaps in which they find themselves, than by any attributes that might be typically used to define individuals across space and time, such as demographic categories or personality indicators. Situations and people are constantly changing, but patterns of interaction between people and situations as they are defined by people seem to be somewhat more stable".

=== Organizational Information Theory and innovation ===
"In 2000, the researchers Doughtery, Borrelli, Munir and O'Sullivan discovered that the level of innovation capability within organizations was connected to the ability of making the right sense of collective experiences in uncertain or ambiguous situations such as radical changes in the market or technology paradigm shifts".

Instinctively, it seems, the sensemaking systems of less innovative companies appeared to be inhibited by tendencies to "play within existing rules...filter out unexpected information or unorthodox competency sets, resulting in groupthink and more of the same". Meanwhile, "innovative organizations ...dared to challenge existing business logic and made use of new insights"...these, in turn, were used to "change existing interpretations and schemes and thus, influence the overall evolvement of the organization so that the interpretation schemes themselves became more apt to deal with outside forces".

Weick proposes three dynamics which are closely relevant to innovation: "that the knowledge is both tacit and articulated, that linking processes cut across several levels of organizational action, and that linking processes embody several tensions". A study applies these dynamics and organizational sensemaking to analyze how people make sense of market and technology knowledge for product innovation. Innovative organizations have a system of sensemaking that allows actors to "construct, bracket, interpret, and rethink the right kinds of market and technology knowledge in the right way for innovation". However, actors in non-innovative organizations make sense of knowledge in a separate way.

See also:

=== Computer-mediated communication (CMC) and sensemaking ===
Computer-mediated communication has gradually become an essential part of communication in current work context and organizational settings. Weick proposes that sensemaking away from terminals experiences five procedures: effectuate, triangulate, affiliate, deliberate, and consolidate.

According to Garphart, compared with in traditional workplace, sensemaking in electronically enabled work place becomes more complex and ambiguous. and act differently in the above five procedures. To be specific. four distinct features can be seen. Firstly, the process of reciprocity is much confined. The reciprocity of perspectives might be delayed when communicators are at different "terminals". Also, sensory cues are nearly absent in this process, while textual communication is commonly used. In other words, communication modes are limited. Secondly, the levels of equivocality and the difficulties of sensemaking increase. The problems of understanding computer or new technical terms emerge as a new obstacle to be overcome for achieving sensemaking in organizations. Thirdly, less etcetera principles can be used to in CMC. In other words, CMC tends to build up a rigidly structured communication environment, due to which, people will find it harder to gain additional information from outside the computer system. Lastly, CMC alters the occupational tasks. Some technical background or computer-related knowledge are required to support general occupational tasks.

There are two major models proposed to explain the sensemaking with CMC in organizations: Weick's cognitive model and a social interaction model.

Weick believes that people will increasingly encounter with problems to make sense information with new technology. Cognitive Model posits states that new computer technologies have a huge impact on sensemaking in organizations in five aspects. First, actions deficiencies always happen because real objects can not be fully captured and represented by simulated images and symbols. Second, comparisons are often deficient due to limited reciprocity of perspectives and nearly absent feedback based on direct action. Third, works at terminals are always solitary and will decrease affiliation of communication. Fourth, constant inflow of information in computer interrupt or even prevent the deliberation. Lastly, sensemaking at terminals always leads to consolidation deficiencies due to self-contained nature of computer.

Social Interactional Model, deriving from phenomenological sociology and ethnomethodology, emphasizes the intersubjective and objective features of sensemaking. Intersubjective feature reveals that people always try to obtain subjective meanings of others. In CMC, communicators are required to actively figure out whether they share meanings with others, including computers. In this process, people are expected to use normal form objects, terms and utterances to portray correctly the contexts and experiences in order to let computer recognize. However, increasing number of knowledge are needed to achieve sensemaking than that in traditional workplace. Thus, etcetera principle come into use to deal with vague or implicit meanings. People will actively seek additional information to clarify the meanings. Meanwhile, descriptive vocabularies are used as indexical expressions to assist people to resolve equivocal meanings based on contextual, cultural, technical knowledge and information.

== See also ==
- Collaborative information seeking
- Computer-supported collaborative learning
- Computer-supported collaboration
- Diffusion of innovation theory
- Organizational learning theory
- Sociological theory of diffusion
- Uncertainty reduction theory
