= Scott Sonenshein =

Organisational psychologist

- Education: University of Michigan, University of Cambridge, University of Virginia
- Known for: Resourcefulness, change, business ethics, and qualitative methods
- Spouse: Randi Sonenshein
- Scientific career
- Fields: Organization behavior, organization change, organization theory
- Workplaces: Rice University
- Website: http://www.ScottSonenshein.com

Scott Sonenshein is the Henry Gardiner Symonds Professor at the Jesse H. Jones School of Business, Rice University. He is an organizational psychologist that primarily uses field methodologies to examine questions around work and organizations. Sonenshein is also the author of the book Stretch: Unlock the Power of Less – and Achieve More than You Ever Imagined. His latest book is Joy at Work, co-written with Marie Kondo, which was released in 2020.

== Career ==
Sonenshein completed his PhD in Management and Organizations from the University of Michigan in 2007 after spending several years working at Vividence, an Internet startup during the dotcom era funded by Kleiner Perkins and Sequoia capital that was eventually purchased by Keynote Systems. His time in Silicon Valley inspired his research on organizational change and resourcefulness. He also holds a bachelor's degree from the University of Virginia and a master's degree from the University of Cambridge.

After graduating from Michigan, Sonenshein joined the faculty at Rice University, where he rose from an assistant professor to holding an endowed chair in under ten years.

== Books ==
Sonenshein's first book, Stretch, published by HarperCollins, synthesizes his decade-plus of research to explain why our focus on the amount of resources overlooks how best to use the resources already in hand. Stretch reveals two mindsets that shape how we go about our lives: “stretching” and “chasing.” Stretchers embrace what they have, finding unconventional and productive ways to use resources already at hand. Chasers, by contrast, can't see the possibilities before them—and they're left wanting more to do more. Stretch was a Wall Street Journal bestseller and was named by the Washington Post as one of the 10 books on leadership to read in 2017.

His latest book, Joy at Work, was co-written with international tidying expert Marie Kondo. It was published in North America by Little, Brown.

== Media ==
Stretch received extensive media coverage upon its release and Sonenshein authored several articles applying the concept beyond work, including one of the most widely read stories in the New York Times' Well section in 2017 called, "To Raise Better Kids, Say No," and a feature for Time Magazine called, "The Key to Success Is Not Having More." He has also written for outlets such as Fast Company, Harvard Business Review, Fox News, CNBC, and Entrepreneur. His quote appearing on the front-page story of the New York Times warned about some of the challenges to fliers in an increasingly consolidated industry when United Airlines merged with Continental Airlines. Time named it the quote of the day.

== Academic research ==
Sonenshein's academic research spans topics including organizational change, social change and ethics, creativity and theories of resources. He previously served as an Associate Editor at Academy of Management Journal and has published papers in every top journal in organizational behavior.

Some of his key papers include:

Spreitzer, G., Sutcliffe, K., Dutton, J., Sonenshein, S., & Grant, A. M. (2005). A socially embedded model of thriving at work. Organization science, 16(5), 537–549.

Sonenshein, S. (2006). Crafting social issues at work. Academy of Management Journal, 49(6), 1158–1172.

Sonenshein, S. (2007). The role of construction, intuition, and justification in responding to ethical issues at work: The sensemaking-intuition model. Academy of Management Review, 32(4), 1022–1040.

Sonenshein, S. (2010). We're Changing—Or are we? untangling the role of progressive, regressive, and stability narratives during strategic change implementation. Academy of Management Journal, 53(3), 477–512.

Sonenshein, S. (2014). How organizations foster the creative use of resources. Academy of Management Journal, 57(3), 814–848.

Vaara, E., Sonenshein, S., & Boje, D. (2016). Narratives as Sources of Stability and Change in Organizations: Approaches and Directions for Future Research. The Academy of Management Annals, 10(1), 495–560.

Sonenshein, S., Nault, K., & Obodaru, O. (2017). Competition of a different flavor: How a strategic group identity shapes competition and cooperation. Administrative Science Quarterly, 62(4), 626–656.
