= Tamara (play) =

Play by John Krizanc

- Original language: English
- Written by: John Krizanc
- Subject: Painter Tamara de Lempicka
- Setting: Il Vittoriale degli Italiani

Premiere
- Date: May 8, 1981
- Place: Strachan House, Trinity-Bellwoods Park; Toronto, Ontario

Tamara is a 1981 play by John Krizanc about the painter Tamara de Lempicka. The play is based on the historical meeting of Gabriele d'Annunzio and Lempicka, who was hoping to be commissioned by d'Annunzio to paint his portrait. He had invited her to his villa at Gardone Riviera, on the southwest shore of Lake Garda, a villa now known as Vittoriale degli Italiani.

== Style ==
The play draws the audience into a labyrinthine story which reflects complicity in civic responsibility. Lempicka declines to use her voice, despite the power given it through her cultural preeminence. She sells her art to the highest bidder without comment.

In Tamara, the barrier between spectator and actor has been dissolved; the spaces intermingle, and spectators become actors on many stages. Tamara is postmodern theatre performed in a large house with ten actors performing simultaneous scenes in several different rooms; at other times there is simultaneous action in eleven rooms. The spectator can accompany the character of their choice and experience the story they choose, knowing that with the simultaneous performances they cannot experience the whole play. Thus the members of the audience make a series of choices, and depending upon these choices, each spectator creates and develops an individual viewing of it.

== Productions ==
The play was premiered at Strachan House in Trinity-Bellwoods Park, Toronto, Canada, on May 8, 1981, under the direction of Richard Rose, and was published in book form the same year as Tamara: A Play. Tamara won two Dora Mavor Moore Awards in 1982, one as an outstanding new play, and another as an outstanding production.

In May 1984, Tamara opened in Los Angeles, where it ran for nine years. The Art Deco-styled Hollywood American Legion Post 43 on Highland Ave in Hollywood was the venue. The hall was originally decorated with about a dozen paintings by the title character, Tamara de Lempicka, drawn from various collections including those of Barbra Streisand and Jack Nicholson, until the insurance costs proved prohibitive.

Soon after the play opened in New York in 1987 at the Park Avenue Armory. It starred Sara Botsford as Lempicka. The New York production enjoyed a five-year run. It also played from 1990 to 1994 in Buenos Aires and was performed in Mexico City.

In spring of 1990 American producer Peter Klein produced and presented Tamara for a month at Villa Brasini in Rome and then for another month at Villa Erba on Lake Como, with George Rondo directing.

In 2003, a 20th anniversary production was mounted in Toronto with Tamara Hickey in the lead role.

In 2014, Quantum Theatre put on Tamara for six weeks at the Rodef Shalom Congregation in Pittsburgh, Pennsylvania.

== Structure ==
There are five key choices in the play:

1. As characters leave and separate from a room, which will you follow?
2. Or will you wait and see who shows up in one or several rooms?
3. Will you follow the same character all the time, or switch characters as the play progresses?
4. Will you stay with a friend, or each adopt different strategies?
5. How will you respond when an actor gives you instructions (e.g., to follow them, or wait in the room)?

== Responses ==
In 1995 David Boje wrote an article for Academy of Management Journal about the play, and how people coming to a room in the play from different room sequences, will have very different organizational storytelling sensemaking of what is happening. Inspired by the play, Boje founded an academic journal titled Tamara: Journal for Critical Organization Inquiry.
