= Living story =

Oral tradition

For oral tradition, when stories lead to a restorying of the past narrative, or the future antenarrative, they become living stories. For example, David Boje says “living story has many authors and as a collective force has a life of its own. We live in living stories.” In the work of Native scholar Twotrees, living stories have a mind, a time, and a place. For Gregory Cajete and lived stories are the “life and process of the natural world becoming vehicles for the transmission of culture".
