= Cosmology episode =

A cosmology episode is a sudden loss of meaning, followed eventually by a transformative pivot, which creates the conditions for revised meaning.

In the wake of the 1962 Cuban Missile Crisis, the Vietnam War, the 1977 Tenerife airport disaster, the 1984 Bhopal chemical disaster, and the relatively sudden insertion of personal computers into the workplace, organizational scholar Karl E. Weick coined the term "cosmology episode," as follows, in 1985:

"Representations of events normally hang together sensibly within the set of assumptions that give them life and constitute a 'cosmos' rather than its opposite, a 'chaos.' Sudden losses of meaning that can occur when an event is represented electronically in an incomplete, cryptic form are what I call a 'cosmology episode.'

Representations in the electronic world can become chaotic for at least two reasons: The data in these representations are flawed, and the people who manage those flawed data have limited processing capacity. These two problems interact in a potentially deadly vicious circle."

The concept of cosmology episodes evolved significantly between 1985 and 1993, when Weick published his now-classic reanalysis of Norman Maclean's study of the Mann Gulch wildland firefighting disaster in 1949. In the 1993 article, Weick positions cosmology episodes within a constructivist ontology, he links the term to a variety of similar concepts, and he provides a better-developed definition than he was able to provide in 1985.

First, Weick makes it clear that cosmology episodes occur within a constructivist ontology of the world, rather than the more familiar objectivist and subjectivist ontologies:

"The basic idea of sensemaking is that reality is an ongoing accomplishment that emerges from efforts to create order and make retrospective sense of what occurs... Sensemaking emphasizes that people try to make things rationally accountable to themselves and others. Thus, in the words of Morgan, Frost, and Pondy (1983: 24), "individuals are not seen as living in, and acting out their lives in relations to, a wider reality, so much as creating and sustaining images of a wider reality, in part to rationalize what they are doing. They realize their reality by 'reading into' their situation patterns of significant meaning."

Second, Weick clarifies the key phrase "sudden loss of meaning" by linking it to related ideas described by other organizational scholars:

"Minimal organizations, such as we find in the crew at Mann Gulch, are susceptible to sudden losses of meaning, which have been variably described as fundamental surprises (Reason, 1990) or as events that are inconceivable (Lanir, 1989), hidden (Westrum, 1982), or incomprehensible (Perrow, 1984).

Each of these labels points to the low probability that the event could occur, which is why it is meaningless. But these explanations say less about the astonishment of the perceiver, and even less about the perceiver's inability to rebuild some sense of what is happening."

Third, Weick expands his 1985 definition — "sudden losses of meaning" — to a more nuanced description:

"Cosmology refers to a branch of philosophy often subsumed under metaphysics that combines rational speculation and scientific evidence to understand the universe as a totality of phenomena.

Cosmology is the ultimate macro perspective, directed at issues of time, space, change, and contingency as they relate to the origin and structure of the universe. Integrations of these issues, however, are not just the handiwork of philosophers.

Others also must make their peace with these issues, as reflected in what they take for granted. People, including those who are smokejumpers, act as if events cohere in time and space and that change unfolds in an orderly manner.

These everyday cosmologies are subject to disruption. And when they are severely disrupted, I call this a cosmology episode (Weick, 1985: 51-52). A cosmology episode occurs when people suddenly and deeply feel that the universe is no longer a rational, orderly system."

== Types of Cosmology Episodes ==
Building on Weick's 1993 definition of cosmology episodes, Weick, his colleagues, and other researchers have advanced knowledge of best practices during cosmology episodes at four levels of analysis:

1. Catastrophic cosmology episodes, such as the 9/11 terrorist attacks of 2001 and the Haitian earthquake of 2010
2. Disastrous cosmology episodes, such as the 2004 Indian Ocean tsunami and the 2005 Hurricane Katrina
3. Contextualized cosmology episodes occurring within specific domains, such as the 1976 Three Mile Island nuclear system incident and the 1970 Apollo 13 space system incident, and
4. Everyday cosmology episodes, such as the transition of leaders at the top of an organization and the introduction of new technologies throughout an organization.

The study of cosmology episodes is distinct from the study of high-reliability organizations because the concept directs explicit attention to the integral role of human spirituality during catastrophic events—as the threatened entity (what is my role in the universe?), the source of inspiration/improvisation (what am I able to do to respond to the event?), and the re-established entity (what is my different role in the universe?).

Consequently, the topic of cosmology episodes lends itself to study by researchers within two small academic organizations—the American Psychological Association's Division 36 (Psychology of Religion and Spirituality) and the Academy of Management's MSR Division (Management, Spirituality, and Religion).

== Levels of Analysis ==
A 2016 article titled "Cosmology Episodes: A Reconceptualization," Doug Orton and Kari O'Grady identified three taxonomies that they found helpful in studying 164 citations of the term "cosmology episode" on Google Scholar.

One taxonomy was based on level of analysis (nation, community, organization, team, and individual).

The second taxonomy was based on five resilience processes (anticipating, sense-losing, improvising, sense-remaking, and renewing).

The third taxonomy -- of interest here -- is level of intensity of the cosmology episode (catastrophe, disaster, crisis, ancillary, and metaphorical).

Communications researchers tend to be more present in the study of community disasters; management researchers tend to be more present in the study of organizational crises.

Importantly, though, it is possible for a community-level cosmology episode to be catastrophic (e.g. Hurricane Katrina), disastrous (e.g the Red River floods of 1997), a crisis (e.g. the 22 July 2005 Stockwell Subway Shooting), ancillary (e.g. an e coli epidemic for a food company), and metaphorical (e.g. the introduction of new technology in an Italian courtroom).
