= Christine Beckman =

American academic

Christine Beckman is an American author and professor in the Technology Management Department at UC Santa Barbara. She is the current Editor at Administrative Science Quarterly. She studies social innovation and inequality.

== Early life and education ==
Beckman holds a B.A. in Psychology, with distinction, an M.A. in Sociology, and a Ph.D. in Organizational Behavior from Stanford University. Her Ph.D. Dissertation was called "Learning from difference: The influence of network partners on organizational learning."

== Career and research ==
Beckman was formerly the Price Family Chair in Social Innovation and Professor at the University of Southern California, Price School of Public Policy. Beckman served on the faculty at the Robert H. Smith School of Business, University of Maryland, and the Paul Merage School of Business, University of California, Irvine. At UC Irvine, she was a Chancellor's Fellow from 2008 to 2011 and Faculty Director of the Don Beall Center for Entrepreneurship and Innovation.

She studied the LA2050 Grants Challenge. She was the 2006 Western Academy of Management Ascendent Scholar.

== Selected publications ==
- Irene, H., Mair, J., & Beckman, C. M., "Researching Social Innovation: How the unit of analysis informs the questions we ask"; Rutgers Business Review, 7(2): 153–165; 2022.
- Beckman, C. M., Alternatives and Complements to Rationality; In C. M. Beckman (Ed.), Carnegie goes to California: Advancing and Celebrating the Work of James G. March (Research in the Sociology of Organizations). Emerald Publishing Limited, Bingley; 2021.
- Beckman, Christine M. and Melissa Mazmanian, Dreams of the Overworked: Living, Working, and Parenting in the Digital Age; Stanford University Press; 2020, ISBN 978-1-5036-0255-7.
- Mazmanian, M. A., & Beckman, C. M., "Making your numbers: Engendering Organizational Control through a Ritual of Quantification"; Organization Science; 2019.
