= Barbara Czarniawska =

Polish academic (1948–2024)

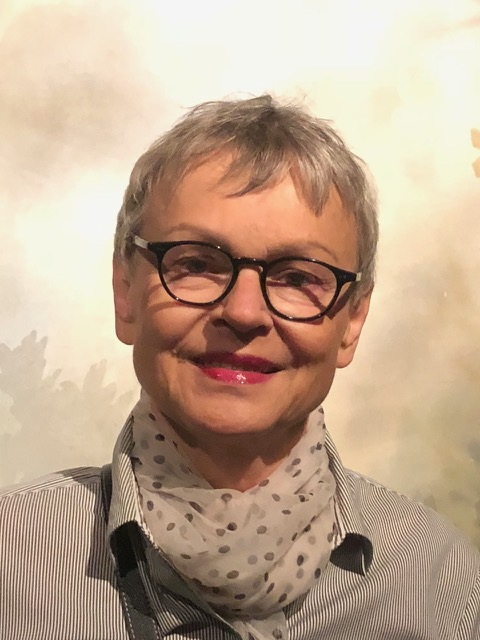
- Born: 2 December 1948; Białystok, Poland
- Died: 7 April 2024 (aged 75); Gothenburg, Sweden

Academic background
- Education: MA in Social and Industrial Psychology, Warsaw University (1970), PhD in Economic Sciences, Warsaw School of Economics (1976)

Barbara Czarniawska (also known as Barbara Czarniawska-Joerges, 2 December 1948 – 7 April 2024) was a Polish-Swedish organisation scholar.

Czarniawska was a Senior Professor of Management Studies at Gothenburg Research Institute, Gothenburg School of Business, Economics and Law, Sweden. Her research took a constructionist perspective on organizing, most recently exploring the management of overflows, and integration processes. She was interested in complex organizations, institutionalism, action nets, organizational change, as well as methodology, especially in fieldwork techniques and in the application of narratology to organization studies.

== Education ==
Barbara Czarniawska-Joerges was born in Białystok on 2 December 1948. She held an MA in Social and Industrial Psychology from Warsaw University, 1970; Ph.D.in Economic Sciences from Warsaw School of Economics, 1976.

== Affiliations ==
In the years 1984–1990 she worked at Stockholm School of Economics, first as an assistant professor, and later as an associate professor. She became full professor at Lund University in 1990, and moved to the University of Gothenburg in 1996. She was a visiting research fellow at the MIT Sloan School of Management, US; London School of Economics and Political Science; Wissenschaftszentrum Berlin; and scholar-in-residence at Rockefeller Foundation, Bellagio, Italy. She was a visiting professor at Università di Roma 1, "La Sapienza", Università degli Studi di Napoli Federico II, Università di Bologna, Università di Trento, and Università di Venezia, Italy; University College Dublin, Ireland; Macquarie University and UTS Business School, Sydney, Australia; University of Edinburgh, and University of Glasgow, Scotland; Ben Gurion University, Beer Sheva, Israel; University of Leicester, and London School of Economics and Political Science, UK; University of Alberta, Edmonton, and University of Manitoba, Winnipeg, Canada; University of Innsbruck, Austria; and Jagiellonian University, Kraków, Poland. Czarniawska was a member of the Royal Swedish Academy of Sciences from 2000, the Royal Swedish Academy of Engineering Sciences from 2001, the Royal Society of Art and Sciences in Gothenburg from 2002, and of the Finnish Society of Sciences and Letters from 2009. From 2021 she was fellow of the British Academy.

== Death ==
Czarniawska died in Gothenburg on 7 April 2024, at the age of 75.

== Honors and awards ==
- 2000 Lily and Sven Thuréus Technical-Economic Award “for internationally renowned research in organization theory"
- 2003 Wihuri International Prize "in recognition of creative work that has specially furthered and developed the cultural and economic progress of mankind".
- 2005 Oeconomiae doctor honoris causa, Stockholm School of Economics
- 2006 Doctor Mercaturae Honoris Causa, Copenhagen Business School
- 2006 Honorary Doctor of Science (Economics), Helsinki School of Economics[3]
- 2011 Honorary Member of European Group for Organization Studies (EGOS)
- 2013 Pro Studio et Scientia, School of Business, Economics and Law at the University of Gothenburg
- 2017 1st EIASM Interdisciplinary Leader Award, 3 April 2017
- 2017 Honorary Member of ASSIOA, Associazione Italiana di Organizzazione Aziendale
- 2018 Doctor Mercaturae Honoris Causa, Det Samfundsvidenskabelige Fakultet, Aalborg Universitet
- 2019 Honorary Member of puntOorg International Research Network
- 2021 elected corresponding member of British Academy
- 2021 NEON prize for an extraordinary journey of achievements in Management- and Organization (MOS) studies
- 2022 Honorary Doctor of Turku School of Economics, University of Turku, Finland
- 2023 Edith Penrose Award (INSEAD/EURAM) 2023 for Trail Blazing Research, 16 June 2023

== Bibliography (in English) ==
- (1988) Ideological control in nonideological organizations, New York: Praeger.
- (1989) Economic decline and organizational control, New York: Praeger
- (1992) Exploring complex organizations: a cultural perspective, Newbury Park, CA: Sage.
- (1993/2006) The three-dimensional organization: A constructionist view, Lund: Studentlitteratur.
- (1996) & Sevón, Guje (eds) Translating organizational change, Berlin; New York: Walter de Gruyter.
- (1997) Narrating the organization: dramas of institutional identity, Chicago: University of Chicago Press.
- (1998) Narrative approach in organization studies, Thousand Oaks, Calif.: Sage Publications.
- (1999) Writing management: organization theory as a literary genre, Oxford; New York: Oxford University Press.
- (1994) & Guillet de Monthoux, Pierre (eds) Good novels, better management: reading organizational realities, Chur: Harwood Academic Publishers.
- (2000) A city reframed. Managing Warsaw in the 1990s, Reading, UK: Harwood Academic Publishers.
- (2002) A tale of three cities, or the glocalization of city management, Oxford, UK: Oxford University Press.
- (2002) & Höpfl, Heather (eds) Casting the other: the production and maintenance of inequalities in work organizations, London; New York: Routledge.
- (2004) Narratives in social science research, London: Sage
- (2005) & Sevón, Guje (eds) Global ideas: how ideas, objects and practices travel in the global economy, Malmö, Sweden: Liber & Copenhagen Business School Press.
- (2005/2020) & Hernes, Tor (eds) ANT and organizing, Malmö, Sweden: Liber & Copenhagen Business School Press.
- (2007)Shadowing and other techniques for doing fieldwork in modern societies, Malmö/Copenhagen/Oslo: Liber/CBS Press/Universitetsforlaget.
- (2008/2014) A theory of organizing, Cheltenham, UK: Edward Elgar Publishing.
- (2011) Cyberfactories: How news agencies produce news, Cheltenham, UK: Edward Elgar Publishing.
- (2012) & Löfgren, Orvar Managing overflow in affluent societies, New York: Routledge
- (2013) & Löfgren, Orvar Coping with excess: How organizations, communities and individuals manage overflow, Cheltenham: Edward Elgar
- (2014) Social science research from field to desk. London: Sage.
- (2019) & Löfgren, Orvar Overwhelmed by overflows? How people and organizations create and manage excess, Lund: Lund University Press.
- (2020) & Solli, Rolf;Demediuk, Peter and Dennis Anderson Searching for the new welfare models, London: Palgrave Macmillan
- (2021) & Joerges, Bernward Robotization of work? Answers from popular culture, media and social sciences.Cheltenham: Edward Elgar.
- 2023 - (with Josef Pallas & Elena Raviola) Att trolla med knäna - Berättelser om pandemin och de människor som fått den svenska välfärden att fortsätta fungera. Stockholm: Bokförlaget Atlas.

== Edited books and special issues of journals ==
- 2023 (with Andreas Diedrich) Organizing immigrants’ integration. Practices and consequences in labour markets and societies. Palgrave Macmillan.
- 2023 (with Rafael Alcadipani, Gianluca Miscione, Elena Raviola, and Emre Tarim) Organizing outside organizations, Part 1. PuntOOrg International Journal, 8(1).
- 2023 (with Rafael Alcadipani, Elena Raviola, and Emre Tarim) Organizing outside organizations, Part 2. PuntOorg International Journal, 8(2).
- 2022 (with Małgorzata Ćwikła, and Michał Pałasz) Posthumanizm i zarządzanie. Culture Management, 23(1).
- 2020 (with Hernes. Tor) (eds.) ANT and organizing 2nd edition. Lund: Studentlitteratur.
- 2019 (with Orvar L.fgren) Overwhelmed by overflows? How people and organizations create and manage excess. Lund: Lund University Press.
- 2017 (with Metzger, Jonathan and Wieczorkowska-Wierzbinska, Grazyna) Managing overflows. European Management Journal, 35(6).
- 2017 A research agenda for management and organization studies. Cheltenham: Edward Elgar.
- 2015 (with Lindberg, Kajsa and Solli, Rolf) After NPM? Scandinavian Journal of Public Administration, 19(2).
- 2013 (with L.fgren, Orvar) Coping with excess: How organizations, communities and individuals manage overflows. Cheltenham: Edward Elgar.
- 2012 (with L.fgren, Orvar) Managing overflow in affluent societies. New York: Routledge.
- 2011 Special Themed Section: Fashion in research and in management. OrganizationStudies, 32(5).
- 2009 Organizing in the face of threat and risk. Cheltenham, UK: Edward Elgar. In Swedish:
- 2007 Organisering kring hot och risk. Lund: Studentlitteratur.
- 2008 (with Panozzo, Fabrizio) Trends and fashions in management studies (II): Mutual influences. International Studies of Management & Organization, 38(2), Summer.
- 2008 (with Panozzo, Fabrizio) Trends and fashions in management studies (I): Fashion in research. International Studies of Management & Organization, 38(1), Spring.
- 2006 (with Gagliardi, Pasquale) Management & humanities. Cheltenham, UK: Edward Elgar.
- 2006 Organization theory. Vol. I: Central topics, Vol. II: Current trends and disciplinary reflection. Cheltenham, UK: Edward Elgar.
- 2005 (with Sev.n, Guje) (eds.) Global ideas: How ideas, practices and artifacts travel in the global economy. Malm.: Liber/CBS.
- 2005 (with Hernes. Tor) (eds.) ANT and organizing. Malm.: Liber.
- 2003 (with Gagliardi, Pasquale) (eds.) Narratives we organize by. Amsterdam: John Benjamins.
- 2003 (with Sevón, Guje) (eds.) The Northern lights. Organization theory in Scandinavia. Malm.: LiberAbstrakt.
- 2002 (with H.pfl, Heather) (eds.) Casting the Other. The production and maintenance of inequalities in work organizations. London: Routledge.
- 2001 (with Solli, Rolf) (eds.) Organizing metropolitan space and discourse. Malm./Oslo: LiberAbstrakt
- 2001 (with Solli, Rolf) (eds.) Modernisering av storstaden. Marknaden och management i stora st.der vid sekelskiftet. Malm.: Liber
- 1998 (ed.) Organisationteori p. svenska. Malm.: Liber
- 1996 (with Sevón, Guje) (eds.) Translating organizational change. Berlin: Walter de Gruyter.
- 1995 Managerial and organizational rhetoric. Studies in Cultures, Organizations and Societies, 1(2).
- 1994 (with Guillet de Monthoux, Pierre) Good novels, better management. Reading: Harwood.
- 1994 The construction of gender in organizations. Scandinavian Journal of Management, 10 (2).
- 1994 Painful transformations: Privatization in East and Central Europe. Industrial & Environmental Crisis Quarterly, 8 (1): 1–6.
- 1989 Anthropology of complex organizations (I). International Studies of Management & Organization, 19(3).
- 1989 Anthropology of complex organizations (II) International Studies of Management & Organization, 19 (4)

== See also ==
- Organizational storytelling
- Narrative inquiry
