= Yiannis Gabriel =

Greek-British sociologist

Yiannis Gabriel is a Greek-British sociologist, best known for his contributions to the academic field of organisational storytelling.

Gabriel earned his Ph.D. in sociology in 1981 from UC Berkeley on a dissertation titled Freud and Society. Since 1989, he is affiliated with the University of Bath School of Management, where he since 2009 holds a chair in organisational theory. He has previously held professorships in organisational theory at Imperial College London and Royal Holloway, University of London.
