= Karl E. Weick =

American organizational theorist (1936–2026)

- Born: October 31, 1936; Warsaw, Indiana, U.S.
- Died: May 21, 2026 (aged 89)
- Education: Wittenberg College; Ohio State University
- Known for: loose coupling sensemaking
- Scientific career
- Fields: Social psychology Organization studies
- Workplaces: Purdue University; University of Minnesota; Cornell University; University of Texas at Austin; University of Michigan
- Doctoral advisor: Douglas P. Crowne; Milton J. Rosenberg

Karl Emmanuel Weick (October 31, 1936 – May 21, 2026) was an American organizational theorist who introduced the concepts of "loose coupling", "mindfulness", and "sensemaking" into organizational studies. He was the Rensis Likert Distinguished University Professor at the Ross School of Business at the University of Michigan.

== Background ==
Weick was born in Warsaw, Indiana, on October 31, 1936. He earned his bachelor's degree at Wittenberg College in Springfield, Ohio, in 1958. He went on to Ohio State University, earning his M.A. under the direction of Harold B. Pepinsky in 1960 and his Ph.D. under the direction of Douglas P. Crowne and Milton J. Rosenberg in 1962. Although he tried several degree programs within the psychology department, the department finally built a degree program specifically for Weick and fellow student Genie Plog called "organizational psychology".

Weick died on May 21, 2026, at the age of 89.

== Career ==
From 1962 to 1965, Weick was an assistant professor of psychology at Purdue University in West Lafayette, Indiana. Six months after arriving at Purdue, he received a letter from John C. Flanagan congratulating him on being the 1961-62 Winner of the Best Dissertation of the Year Award in Creative Talent Awards Program sponsored by the American Institutes for Research. Weick submitted an article based on this research to The Journal of Abnormal and Social Psychology, but it was rejected by the editor, Dan Katz. In an unlikely turn of events one of the referees, Arthur R. (Bob) Cohen, wrote the editor indicating that he would like to change his appraisal of the article. This prompted Katz to reconsider the significance of the article. Finally in 1964, Weick's first article to come out of his dissertation was published.

Weick noted that while at Purdue, he was fortunate to develop close ties with faculty in the Krannert School of Management. It was William Starbuck that suggested Weick write a chapter about laboratory experiments and organizations for the first edition of James G. March's Handbook of Organizations, published in 1965. This ultimately established Weick's "identity" as an organizational psychologist.

Also in 1965, Weick moved to the University of Minnesota as an associate professor of psychology, and was promoted to full professor in 1968. In 1972, he left Minnesota to be a professor of psychology and organizational behavior in the business school at Cornell University, and in 1977 was given the title of Nicholas H. Noyes Professor of Organizational Behavior and Professor of Psychology. From 1977 to 1985, he was the editor of the Administrative Science Quarterly.

In 1984 until 1988, Weick was the Harkins and Co. Centennial Chair in Business Administration at University of Texas at Austin. Finally, he moved to the University of Michigan in 1988, where he was the Rensis Likert Distinguished University Professor of Organizational Behavior and Psychology.

== Key contributions ==
=== Enactment ===
Weick used the term enactment to denote the idea that certain phenomena (such as organizations) are created by being talked about.

Managers construct, rearrange, single out, and demolish many 'objective' features of their surroundings. When people act they unrandomize variables, insert vestiges of orderliness, and literally create their own constraints.

=== Loose coupling ===
Weick's major contribution to the topic of loose coupling in an organizational context comes from his 1976 paper on "Educational Organizations as Loosely Coupled Systems" (published in the Administrative Science Quarterly), revisited in his review of subsequent uses of the concept, with JD Orton, in 1990's Loosely Coupled Systems: A Reconceptualization.

Loose coupling in Weick's sense is a term intended to capture the necessary degree of flex between an organization's internal abstraction of reality, its theory of the world, on the one hand, and the concrete material actuality within which it finally acts, on the other. A loose coupling is what makes it possible for these ontologically incompatible entities to exist and act on each other, without shattering (akin to Castoriadis's idea of 'articulation'). Orton and Weick argue in favour of uses of the term which consciously preserve the dialectic it captures between the subjective and the objective, and against uses of the term which 'resolve' the dialectic by folding it into one side or the other.

=== Sensemaking ===
People try to make sense of organizations, and organizations themselves try to make sense of their environment. In this sense-making, Weick pays attention to questions of ambiguity and uncertainty, known as equivocality in organizational research that adopts information processing theory. Because the definition of equivocality is uncertainty, Weick's study in sensemaking is an effort to reduce multiple interpretations. Within his research, Weick studies requisite variety and how organizations can achieve it by having a "most single" reality. His contributions to the theory of sensemaking include research papers such as his detailed analysis of the breakdown of sensemaking in the case of the Mann Gulch disaster, in which he defines the notion of a "cosmology episode" - a challenge to assumptions that causes participants to question their own capacity to act.

In Weick's first book, The Social Psychology of Organizing, he lists seven properties of organizational sensemaking: identity, retrospect, enactment, social contact, ongoing events, cues, and plausibility. This categorization of thought is the human mind's attempt to understand information.

Robert I. Sutton considers a major idea of this book to be summed up as learning to "argue as if you are right and to listen as if you are wrong".

=== Mindfulness ===
Weick introduced the term mindfulness into the organizational and safety literatures in the article Organizing for high reliability: Processes of collective mindfulness (1999). Weick develops the term "mindfulness" from Langer's (1989) work, who uses it to describe individual cognition. Weick's innovation was transferring this concept into the organizational literature as "collective mindfulness". The effective adoption of collective mindfulness characteristics by an organization appears to cultivate safer cultures that exhibit improved system outcomes. The term high reliability organization (HRO) is an emergent property described by Weick (and Karlene Roberts at UC-Berkeley). Highly mindful organizations characteristically exhibit: a) Preoccupation with failure, b) Reluctance to simplify c) Sensitivity to operations, d) Commitment to Resilience, and e) Deference to Expertise.

Weick explained that mindfulness is when we realize our current expectations, continuously improve those expectations based on new experiences, and implement those expectations to improve the current situation into a better one.

=== Organizational information theory ===
Organizational information theory builds upon general systems theory, and focuses on the complexity of information management within an organization. It is sometimes also called Information Systems Theory. The theory addresses how organizations reduce equivocality, or uncertainty through a process of information collection, management and use. However, the goal of Weick was not to eradicate ambiguity, rather work alongside it, because it is a necessary aspect of growth. His structuring of his research was purposefully complex and ambiguous because Weick believed you cannot impose order on a world that is constantly spiraling toward entropy. While in this is strong reasoning, it makes it difficult for individuals to learn and teach this complex theory. This ambiguity creates a cycle of irony, as Weick's goal is to reduce ambiguity within organizations.

Organizational Information theory analyzes how information and sense-making varies from person to person because it is perceptual in nature. Essentially, this theory seeks to answer how people make sense of information in an environment. Weick specifies that environment is not limited to a physical space, but expands into informational realms, especially in reaction to the development of the internet. As information on the internet becomes easily accessible and its consumption increases, the need for this theory is more prominent. Organizations and individuals are constantly acting and reacting in patterns that align with this theory. Its complexity mirrors the humanistic nature of society, and is continuously evolving just as the human race is.

== Plagiarism ==
In several published articles, Weick related a story that originally appeared in a poem by Miroslav Holub, "Brief thoughts on maps", in which soldiers lost in the Alps find their way with an old map, revealed at the end to be a map of the Pyrénées. The original poem was published in the Times Literary Supplement, February 4, 1977. Weick republished the poem with minor differences, sometimes without quotation or attribution. The plagiarism was detailed in an article by Thomas Basbøll and Henrik Graham.

Weick disputed the claim of plagiarism in a response. Basbøll and Graham later remarked that Weick's defense violates some of the assumptions of his theory of sensemaking, also noting: "The American Historical Association acknowledges the existence of this common defence in specific cases of plagiarism, tersely remarking that it "is plausible only in the context of a wider tolerance of shoddy work".

== Publications ==
Books

- 1969, The Social Psychology of Organizing (first edition), Addison-Wesley Pub.
- 1979, The Social Psychology of Organizing (Second edition), McGraw Hill.
- 1995, Sensemaking in Organizations, Sage.
- 2001, Making Sense of the Organization (Volume 1), Blackwell.
- 2001, Managing the Unexpected: Assuring High Performance in an Age of Complexity. with co-author Kathleen M. Sutcliffe, Jossey-Bass.
- 2007, Managing the Unexpected: Resilient Performance in an Age of Uncertainty. with co-author Kathleen M. Sutcliffe, Jossey-Bass.
- 2009, Making Sense of the Organization (Volume 2) The Impermanent Organization, Blackwell.

Articles

- Weick, Karl E. (1993). "The Collapse of Sensemaking in Organizations: The Mann Gulch Disaster". Administrative Science Quarterly. 38 (4): 628. doi:10.2307/2393339.
- Weick, Karl E.; Roberts, Karlene H. (1993). "Collective Mind in Organizations: Heedful Interrelating on Flight Decks". Administrative Science Quarterly. 38 (3): 357. doi:10.2307/2393372.
- Weick, Karl E. (1995). "What Theory is Not, Theorizing Is". Administrative Science Quarterly. 40 (3): 385. doi:10.2307/2393789.
- Weick, Karl E. (2002). "Puzzles in Organizational Learning: An Exercise in Disciplined Imagination". British Journal of Management. 13 (S2). doi:10.1111/1467-8551.13.s2.2. ISSN 1045-3172.
- Weick, Karl E.; Sutcliffe, Kathleen M.; Obstfeld, David (2005). "Organizing and the Process of Sensemaking". Organization Science. 16 (4): 409–421. doi:10.1287/orsc.1050.0133. ISSN 1047-7039.
- Weick, Karl E. (2006). "Faith, Evidence, and Action: Better Guesses in an Unknowable World". Organization Studies. 27 (11): 1723–1736. doi:10.1177/0170840606068351. ISSN 0170-8406.
- Weick, Karl E. (2007). "The Generative Properties Of Richness". Academy of Management Journal. 50 (1): 14–19. doi:10.5465/amj.2007.24160637. ISSN 0001-4273.
- Weick, Karl E. (2010). "Reflections on Enacted Sensemaking in the Bhopal Disaster". Journal of Management Studies. 47 (3): 537–550. doi:10.1111/j.1467-6486.2010.00900.x. ISSN 0022-2380.
- Weick, Karl E. (2010). "Comment on 'softly constrained imagination'". Culture and Organization. 16 (2): 179–179. doi:10.1080/14759551003769326. ISSN 1475-9551.
- Weick, Karl E. (2011). "Organizing for Transient Reliability: The Production of Dynamic Non‐Events". Journal of Contingencies and Crisis Management. 19 (1): 21–27. doi:10.1111/j.1468-5973.2010.00627.x. ISSN 0966-0879.
- Weick, Karl E (2012). "Organized sensemaking: A commentary on processes of interpretive work". Human Relations. 65 (1): 141–153. doi:10.1177/0018726711424235. ISSN 0018-7267.
- Weick, Karl E. (2015). "Ambiguity as Grasp: The Reworking of Sense" (PDF). Journal of Contingencies and Crisis Management. 23 (2): 117–123. doi:10.1111/1468-5973.12080. ISSN 0966-0879.
- Weick, Karl E. (2020). "Sensemaking, Organizing, and Surpassing: A Handoff *" (PDF). Journal of Management Studies. 57 (7): 1420–1431. doi:10.1111/joms.12617. ISSN 0022-2380.
