= David Boje =

American management scholar and organizational theorist

David M. Boje is an American management scholar and Distinguished Professor Emeritus of Management at New Mexico State University (NMSU) in Las Cruces, New Mexico. He is known for developing the concept of antenarrative in organizational studies and for foundational scholarship on storytelling organizations. He has published more than 300 peer-reviewed journal articles and 24 books and is the founding editor of Tamara: Journal for Critical Organization Inquiry.

== Career ==
Boje joined the faculty of New Mexico State University's College of Business as a professor of management, where he subsequently held an endowed Bank of America professorship and was named Distinguished Professor of Management. He is currently Distinguished Professor Emeritus.

== Scholarly contributions ==
=== Storytelling organizations ===
Boje's 1991 article "The Storytelling Organization: A Study of Story Performance in an Office-Supply Firm," published in Administrative Science Quarterly, introduced performance-based storytelling as an object of organizational inquiry. His 1995 article "Stories of the Storytelling Organization: A Postmodern Analysis of Disney as 'Tamara-Land'," published in the Academy of Management Journal, used the multilinear narrative structure of the play Tamara, in which multiple storylines unfold simultaneously in different rooms, as a framework for analyzing organizational life. These articles helped establish organizational narrative studies as a subfield of organization theory.

=== Antenarrative theory ===
Boje coined the term "antenarrative" to describe story fragments that precede and exceed officially sanctioned organizational narratives. The term carries a double meaning: ante as a bet placed before an outcome is known (from the poker term), and ante as that which comes before narrative coherence is imposed by institutional storytellers. The concept is part of a triadic theory of storytelling (distinguishing living story, narrative, and antenarrative) developed across multiple publications and systematically presented in Storytelling and the Future of Organizations: An Antenarrative Handbook (Routledge, 2011).

=== Tamaraland and the Tesseract ===
Drawing on the theatrical metaphor of the play Tamara, Boje developed the concept of Tamaraland to describe organizations as polyphonic, spatially distributed narrative environments in which members simultaneously participate in different storylines with no single master narrative. He subsequently extended this into the Tesseract framework, a four-dimensional model for critical organization inquiry incorporating space, time, possibility, and interference, applied to the study of organizational change and AI accountability.

== Selected publications ==
The following represent Boje's most widely cited works, as recorded on his Google Scholar profile (27,281 total citations; h-index 62).

=== Most cited works ===
- Boje, D. M. (2001). Narrative Methods for Organizational and Communication Research. London: Sage. ISBN 978-0761965435 — cited approximately 3,990 times.
- Boje, D. M. (1991). "The Storytelling Organization: A Study of Story Performance in an Office-Supply Firm." Administrative Science Quarterly, 36(1), 106–126 — cited approximately 3,411 times.
- Boje, D. M. (1995). "Stories of the Storytelling Organization: A Postmodern Analysis of Disney as 'Tamara-Land'." Academy of Management Journal, 38(4), 997–1035 — cited approximately 2,496 times.
- Boje, D. M. (2008). Storytelling Organizations. London: Sage. ISBN 978-1412921893 — cited approximately 1,561 times.

=== Additional books ===
- Boje, D. M. & Baskin, K. (2011). Dancing to the Music of Story: Education for Life and Work. Charlotte, NC: Information Age Press.
- Boje, D. M. (2011). Storytelling and the Future of Organizations: An Antenarrative Handbook. London: Routledge. ISBN 978-0415873918
- Boje, D. M. (2013). Organizational Research: Storytelling In Action. London: Routledge.
- Boje, D. M. (2015). Organizational Change and Global Standardization: Solutions to Standards and Norms Overwhelming Organizations. London: Routledge. ISBN 978-1138800397

=== Selected journal articles ===
- Boje, D. M. & Rosile, G. A. (2003). "Life Imitates Art: Enron's Epic and Tragic Narration." Management Communication Quarterly, 17(1), 85–125.
- Boje, D. M., Rosile, G. A., Durant, R. A., & Luhman, J. T. (2004). "Enron Spectacles: A Critical Dramaturgical Analysis." Organization Studies, 25(5), 751–774.

== Recognition ==
Boje has received lifetime achievement awards from the Organization Development and Change Division of the Academy of Management and from the Western Academy of Management. His published scholarship has accumulated more than 27,000 citations, with an h-index of 62, as recorded on his Google Scholar profile.

== Tamara Journal ==
Boje is the founding editor of Tamara: Journal for Critical Organization Inquiry (tamarajournal.com), an international peer-reviewed journal dedicated to critical, narrative, and postmodern approaches to organization studies.

== Teaching and activism ==
Boje has taught barefoot as a form of protest against sweatshop labor practices by multinational corporations in developing countries.

== See also ==
- Organizational storytelling
- Storytelling
- Antenarrative
- Tamara (play)
- Sensemaking
