= Charleston Symphony Orchestra =

American orchestra

The Charleston Symphony Orchestra aka CSO, is an American orchestra based in Charleston, South Carolina, and performs Masterworks and Pops series, Youth Orchestra concerts and more, at the Gaillard Center and dozens of other venues across the Lowcountry. The current roster of full-time, salaried core musicians is 24. The orchestra supplements its core by bringing more than 400 professionally auditioned guest musicians to Charleston annually.

== History ==
Maude Winthrop Gibbon and Martha Laurens Patterson founded the orchestra in 1936. The orchestra gave its first concert on 28 December 1936, conducted by Tony Hadgi, at the Dock Street Theatre. The orchestra subsequently relocated to the Memminger Auditorium. In the 1980s, the orchestra took up residence at the Gaillard Municipal Auditorium, now folded into the Gaillard Center.

The longest-serving music director of the orchestra was David Stahl, from 1984 until his death on 24 October 2010. Following Stahl's death, Yuriy Bekker served as the orchestra's acting artistic director from 2010 to 2014. In 2016, Bekker became the principal pops conductor of the orchestra. In 2022, Yuriy Bekker was appointed as artistic director.

The most recent music director was Ken Lam, whom the orchestra appointed to the post in 2014, and who began his first full season with the orchestra in September 2015. He concluded his tenure as music director after the 2021–2022 season.

In March 2010 financial problems forced a temporary closure of operations, which restarted in December 2010 after a deal was reached between the musicians and management to reduce the number of core musicians to 24.

In March 2021, in the wake of the COVID-19 pandemic, the orchestra announced an artistic restructuring. This follows the organization's $1 million loss in revenue from ticket sales and local government funding. Aligning with the CSO's COVID-19 recovery plan, the reorganization eliminated the full-time position of music director.

In response to declining access to arts education, the CSO offers of K-12 educational programming in Berkeley, Dorchester, and Charleston counties with a focus on Title I schools. The CSO plays two Young People's Concerts each season, conducts master classes and in-school performances, and hosted the National Young Artist Competition in 2014, 2015, and 2016. The CSO has repeat interactions with approximately 30,000 students per season.

== Music directors ==
- Tony Hadgi (1936–1940)
- J. Albert Frecht (1941–1958)
- Don Mills (1959–1963)
- Lucien DeGroote (1964–1981)
- David Stahl (1984–2010)
- Ken Lam (2014–2022)
