= Wildland Fire Lessons Learned Center =

NAFRI resource center in Tucson, Arizona

The Wildland Fire Lessons Learned Center (LLC), established in 2002, is at the National Advanced Fire and Resource Institute (NAFRI) in Tucson, Arizona. The LLC is primarily a Web-based educational and knowledge resource center that serves the entire wildland fire community. The LLC provides tools and tactics to the wildland fire community to ensure safety and effectiveness in all field operations. The center is supported by the National Wildfire Coordinating Group (NWCG), which includes multiple federal, state, and local land management and firefighting agencies.

== Mission statement ==
"Our mission is to promote learning in the wildland fire service by providing useful and relevant products and services that help to reveal the complexity and risk in the wildland fire environment".

== Establishment ==
The need for a wildland fire lessons learned center became apparent with the TriData Wildland Firefighter Safety Awareness Study, initiated after 14 wildland firefighters died in Colorado's 1994 South Canyon Fire. TriData recommended that one center be set up for all of the nation's wild land firefighters. Consequently, the interagency Wildland Fire Lessons Learned Center was created to focus on striving to improve safe work performance and organizational learning for all wildland firefighters.

The LLC is operated by a full-time staff located in Tucson, Arizona as well as off-site employees in the Pacific Northwest. The center also employs several key contractors and consultants who assist in many of the LLC's major projects and operations. The LLC collaborates with several different groups throughout the country, including: NAFRI, NWCG, The Nature Conservancy (TNC), the National Association of State Foresters (NASF), and the Federal Fire and Aviation Safety Team (FFAST).

The wildland fire community is a widespread group that contains many federal, state and local agencies. While these groups have been collecting data and learning from past incidents for years, they have never consolidated this information into a central location—until the creation of the LLC.

== Operations ==
The LLC uses a variety of methods to disseminate knowledge and encourage networking within the wildland fire community. These methods include: educational videos, conferences, case studies, workshops, interviews, presentations, seminars and Webinars, newsletters, online publications, as well as several other Web-based tools, which can be accessed via the LLC's main Web page: Lessons Learned Center.

The LLC's Web page houses a library of information and includes everything from educational videos to an incident review database. This main Web page also connects to several subpages based on topics that range from large fire management to aviation:

My Fire Community Center: A place for work groups, incident management teams and members of the fire community to contribute learning opportunities, share knowledge, and discuss current issues. Each group has its own neighborhood that provides an online work space and mini library to exchange documents and information. Each community is maintained by a team coordinator, with no need for a Webmaster. Team coordinators have the ability to edit their site content at any time. Very little software knowledge or training is required to maintain one of these groups.

6 Minutes for Safety: a Federal Wildland Fire initiative created by the Federal Fire and Aviation Safety Team (FFAST) that is meant to be used as daily safety material with the intent of informing and generating discussion about the high risk situations that historically endanger wildland firefighters.

Rapid Lesson Sharing: a place for users to submit their own stories about fire-related accidents, close calls, successes, or a way of doing things in a more efficiently or safely.

Advances in Fire Practice (AFP): a collection of articles related to new technologies, recent reports, upcoming and recent Webinars and recent Fire Science publications.

The LLC also hosts a YouTube channel that allows people to watch fire-related videos.

== Online Publications ==
Scratchline: A quarterly newsletter published by the LLC staff that analyzes current methods of practice from the field. The information in this newsletter is drawn from Information Collection Team interviews. The publication's main purpose is to inform subscribers and members of the wildland fire community in a quick and easy-to-digest format. The last issue of "Scratchline" was distributed in early 2011.

Two More Chains: The LLC's newest publication, promotes information sharing within the wildland fire community. It is produced four times a year. The first edition of "Two More Chains" was distributed in the Spring of 2011.

The Learning Curve: Published periodically during the wildland fire season to explain lessons learned and effective practices from the field that have been gathered from After Action Review Rollups.

E-Newsletter: An e-mail newsletter sent out periodically by the LLC to update its target audiences and inform them about current projects.
