= David Stahl (conductor) =

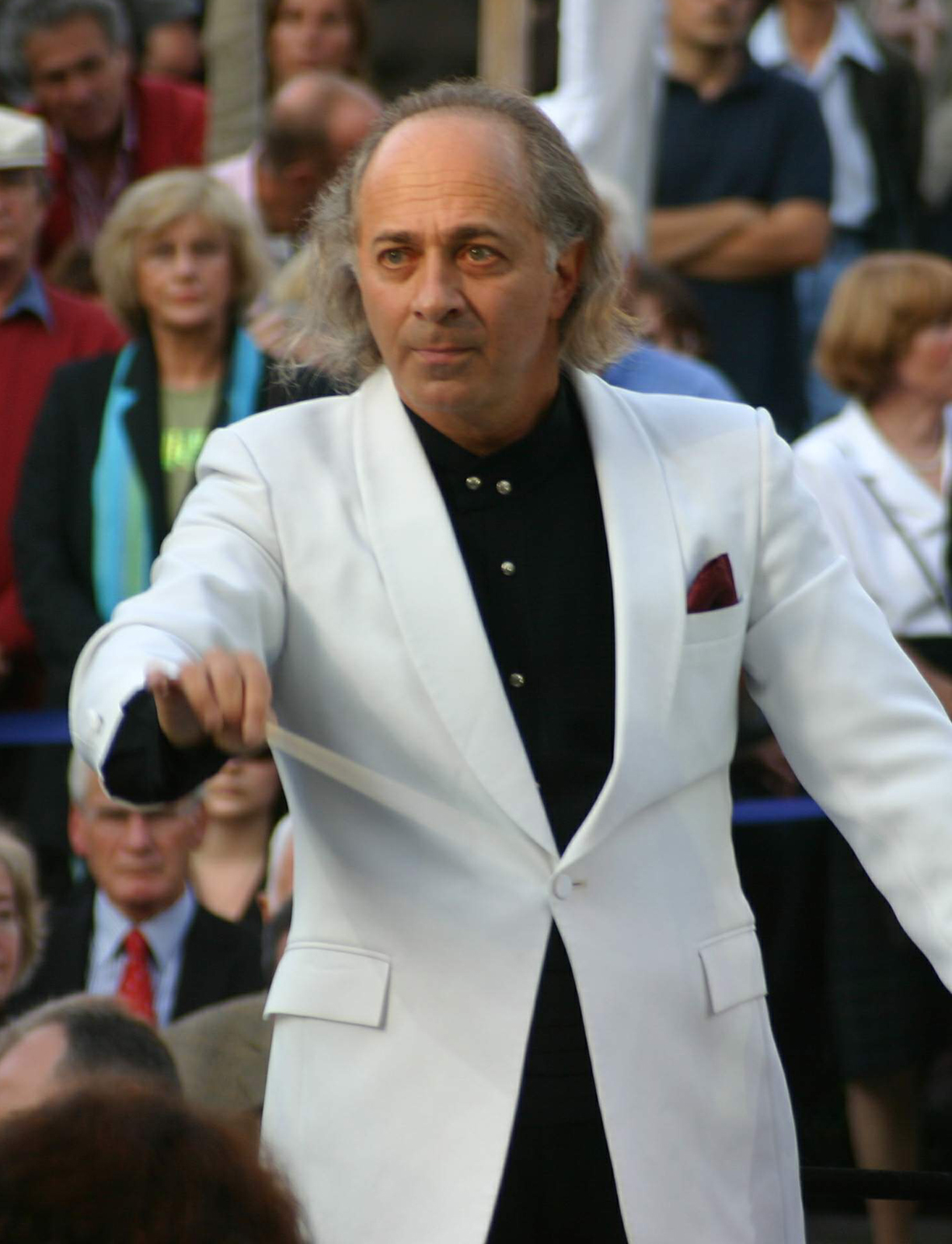
David Stahl conducting an open-air concert in Munich's Gärtnerplatz in September 2006

David Stahl (4 November 1949 – 24 October 2010) was an American conductor who served as the music director and intendant of the Staatstheater am Gärtnerplatz in Munich and the music director of the Charleston Symphony Orchestra. A student of Leonard Bernstein, he was famous for his interpretation of Mahler's works.

== Biography ==
=== Early life and family background ===
Stahl was born in New York City, the son of Jewish emigre parents. David Stahl's father, Frank L. Stahl, was an engineer who took part in the restoration of the Golden Gate Bridge in the 1980s. He was born in Fürth, Germany and attended the same elementary school as Henry Kissinger. Edith Stahl, David Stahl's mother, immigrated to New York in 1938 from Essen, Germany. David Stahl's grandfather, Dr. Leo Stahl (m. Anna Regensburger), was the Jewish Community Leader of Fürth during the Nazi era. Leo was interned in Dachau concentration camp from 11 November to 7 December 1938, and emigrated to England in 1939. Arriving in New York in 1947, he was, according to Das Schicksal der jüdischen Rechtsanwälte in Bayern nach 1933, by Reinhard Weber, unsuccessful in business and died there in 1952, aged 67. Frank's sister Liselotte, after a time in Manchester, England, also came to New York, where she died in 2007.

=== Professional career ===
Stahl studied conducting at Queens College, City University of New York. After making his Carnegie Hall debut at age 23, he came under the tutelage of Leonard Bernstein, eventually taking over as music director of the Broadway production of West Side Story. In 1984, he became Music Director of the Charleston Symphony Orchestra; a position he remained in until his death 26 years later. In 1996 he was invited to be guest conductor at the Staatstheater am Gärtnerplatz. He assumed the title of Music Director there from 1999. He also worked frequently as a guest conductor of operas and musicals at major theatres around the world, including the Bavarian State Opera, the Deutsche Oper Berlin, the Lyric Opera of Chicago, and the New York City Opera among others.

As an enthusiast of Bernstein, he had been behind several revivals of Candide, including conducting an acclaimed 2003 German language production narrated by Loriot and a 2008 production in Charleston, South Carolina. He was also involved in the staging of a notable production of Gershwin's Porgy and Bess in Charleston, the city where the opera is set, which went on to tour internationally in the early 1990s. In 2009 he celebrated 25 years at CSO and 10 years at the Gärtnerplatz.

David Stahl died of lymphoma on October 24, 2010. His wife, Karen, died in September 2010. The couple had two children, Anna and Byron. David had met Karen when his daughter from his first marriage, Sonya, became a student in Karen's kindergarten class at Ashley River Creative Arts Elementary.

== Further sources ==
- Charleston Symphony Orchestra. David Stahl (link no longer available)
- Golden Gate Bridge, Highway and Transportation District. Golden Gate Bridge Anniversaries (70th)
- Koob, Lindsay (April 1, 2009). "Masterworks concert upholds high standards". Charleston City Paper
- Michael Müller Verlag. Reportage: Das jüdische Fürth. Eine langlebige Eintracht zwischen Katholiken, Protestanten und Juden (in German)
- Parker, Adam (March 29, 2009). "Musicians, staff agree to 'sacrifice'", The Post and Courier
- Rieger, Susanne and Jochem, Gerhard (2006). "The Exclusion of Jewish Lawyers in Bavaria in December 1938". Rijo Research
- Schmid, Toni (January 2009). "Einmal Bayern – USA und Jahre später immer wieder hinüber und herüber". Aviso: Zeitschrift für Wissenschaft & Kunst in Bayern (in German)
- Staatstheater am Gärtnerplatz. "David Stahl - 4.11.1949-24.10.2010". (Obituary of David Stahl) (in German)
- Stadt Fürth. Henry Kissinger (in German)
- Stadt Fürth. Jüdische Geschichte in Fürth (in German)
- Structurae. Frank L. Stahl
- Weber, Reinhard (2006). Schicksal der jüdischen Rechtsanwälte in Bayern nach 1933. Oldenbourg Wissenschaftsverlag, p. 139. ISBN 3-486-58060-4 (in German)
