= Kathleen M. Sutcliffe =

American academic (born 1950)

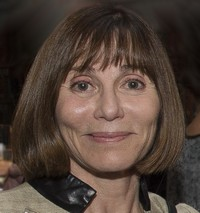
- Born: 1950 (age 75–76); United States
- Education: University of Michigan (BA); University of Alaska Anchorage (BS); University of Washington (MSN); University of Texas at Austin (PhD)
- Known for: High reliability organization Organizational theory
- Awards: Bloomberg Distinguished Professorships (2014)
- Scientific career
- Fields: High reliability organizing Risk management Resilience; Change management
- Workplaces: Johns Hopkins University

Kathleen Sutcliffe is a Bloomberg Distinguished Professor of Medicine and Business at the Johns Hopkins University Carey Business School and School of Medicine and the Gilbert and Ruth Whitaker Professor Emerita of Business Administration at the University of Michigan Ross School of Business. She studies high-reliability organizations and group decision making in order to understand how organizations and their members cope with uncertainty and unexpected events, with a focus on reliability, resilience, and safety in health care.

== Biography ==
Kathleen Sutcliffe received a Bachelor of Arts degree from the University of Michigan, a Bachelor of Science degree from the University of Alaska, and a Master of Nursing from the University of Washington. Prior to doctoral studies, she was the Director of Health and Social Services for the Aleutian Pribilof Islands Association and also served as a program manager for the State of Alaska. She also worked as a laborer on the construction of the Alaska pipeline and as a deckhand on a crab fishing boat in the Aleutian Islands. She earned her PhD in management with a focus on organizational behavior and theory from the University of Texas at Austin.

Sutcliffe joined the faculty of the University of Michigan Ross School of Business as an assistant professor of Organizational Behavior and Human Resource Management in 1994. She became an associate professor in 2001, promoted to professor of management and organizations in 2005. In 2006, she was named the Gilbert and Ruth Whitaker Professor of Business Administration and was presented with the Researcher of the Year Award from the University of Michigan’s Ross School of Business for research excellence. She served as the Associate Dean for Faculty Development and Research from 2006 to 2010.

In June 2014, Sutcliffe was named a Bloomberg Distinguished Professor at Johns Hopkins University for her accomplishments as an interdisciplinary researcher and excellence in teaching. The Bloomberg Distinguished Professorship program was established in 2013 by a gift from Michael Bloomberg. Sutcliffe holds joint appointments in the Johns Hopkins Carey Business School and the Johns Hopkins School of Medicine’s Armstrong Institute for Patient Safety and Quality.

She is a member of the Academy of Management and the Strategic Management Society.

== Research ==
Kathleen Sutcliffe is a management and organization theorist who is expert in the areas of organizing under uncertainty and ambiguity, sensemaking, and team dynamics. Together with Karl E. Weick and David Obstfeld at the University of Michigan, she is responsible for re-conceptualizing and reinvigorating research inquiry into the micro-foundations of high reliability (high performance under risk and dynamic conditions). Their work highlights that for organizations in many industries, the ability to perform reliably in real time (the ability to contingently respond to changes in context) results from ongoing patterns of action that fuels capabilities to more quickly sense and manage complex, ill-structured contingencies. Sutcliffe and Timothy Vogus of Vanderbilt University empirically validated the well-established theoretical construct of high reliability organizing and demonstrated its importance for healthcare. Sutcliffe has applied this line of thinking to the adaptability of organizations to unexpected change, and the role of top management in facilitating or preventing change. In the domain of patient safety, Sutcliffe has applied this construct to how healthcare teams can become alert and aware of unfolding untoward situations as they evolve and more effectively cope. She is currently investigating organizational safety and risk in oil exploration and production, wildland firefighting, and in healthcare.

Sutcliffe has taught both undergraduate and graduate courses on a variety of topics including behavioral theory in management, management and organizational behavior, the management of change, and sensemaking in organizations. She has also led executive education courses for the Bank of America Leadership Program and the A.T. Kearney MBA Essentials Program. At Johns Hopkins, Sutcliffe is teaching graduate health care management courses and workshops in patient safety culture and participating in the interdisciplinary Individualized Health Initiative.

In addition, Sutcliffe is an active consultant on matters related to safety organizing and safety culture for a variety of entities, including governmental agencies such the United States Forest Service and Fire Department of New York, non-governmental organizations such as the Mayo Clinic and Cincinnati Children's Hospital Medical Center, and private multinational companies such as General Electric, Hewlett-Packard, and Target. She has provided keynote addresses and training workshops around the world to leadership teams and to industry and professional groups such as Bombardier's annual Safety Standdown, the European Society for Anesthesiology, and the Swiss Nuclear Regulatory Committee.

== Awards ==
- 2018 Distinguished PhD Alumnus Award, McCombs School of Business
- 2018 Elected Fellow of the Academy of Management
- 2016 Awarded Rockefeller Foundation Bellagio Residency Fellowship
- 2015 Awarded the MOC Distinguished Scholar Award, Managerial and Organizational Cognition Division of the Academy of Management

== Publications ==
Kathleen Sutcliffe has published in all of the top tier journals in management and health services research. She has been cited more than 15,000 times in the academic literature and is nationally recognized for her work in patient safety. She regularly translates her research to executive audiences in such journals as the Harvard Business Review and the California Management Review, which is published by the University of California, Berkeley.

In 2012, Sutcliffe was appointed by the National Academy of Sciences Institute of Medicine to a research panel charged with studying and providing recommendations related to workforce resilience to the Department of Homeland Security. The findings were released in a book titled A Ready and Resilient Workforce for the Department of Homeland Security: Protecting America's Front Line.

=== Books ===
- 2001, Managing the Unexpected: Assuring High Performance in an Age of Complexity. with co-author Karl E. Weick, Jossey-Bass.
- 2002, Medical Error: What Do We Know? What Do We Do?. with Marilynn M. Rosenthal
- 2007, Managing the Unexpected: Resilient Performance in an Age of Uncertainty. with co-author Karl E. Weick, Jossey-Bass.
- 2013, A Ready and Resilient Workforce for the Department of Homeland Security: Protecting America’s Front Line. with the Committee on the Department of Homeland Security Workforce Resilience, The National Academies Press.
- 2019, Still Not Safe: Patient Safety and the Middle-Managing of American Medicine. with co-author Robert Wears

=== Highly cited articles ===
- 1994, with Sim B Sitkin, Roger G Schroeder, Distinguishing control from learning in total quality management: a contingency perspective, in: Academy of Management Review. Vol 19. nº 3; 537–564.
- 1998, with Akbar Zaheer, Uncertainty in the transaction environment: An empirical test, in: Strategic Management Journal. Vol. 19, nº 1, 1-23.
- 2002, with J. Stuart Bunderson, Comparing alternative conceptualizations of functional diversity in management teams: Process and performance effects, in: Academy of Management Journal. Vol. 45, nº 5, 875–893.
- 2003, with J. Stuart Bunderson, Management team learning orientation and business unit performance, in Journal of Applied Psychology. Vol, 88, nº 3, 552–560.
- 2004, with Elizabeth L. Lewton and Marilynn M. Rosenthal, Communication Failures: An Insidious Contributor to Medical Mishaps, in: Academic Medicine. Vol. 79, nº 2, 186-194.
- 2005, with Karl E. Weick and David Obstfeld, Organizing and the Process of Sensemaking, in: Organization Science. Vol. 16, nº 4; 409–421.
- 2005, with Gretchen Spreitzer, Jane Dutton, Scott Sonenshein, Adam M Grant, A socially embedded model of thriving at work, in: Organization science. Vol 16, nº 5; 537–549.
- 2006, with Karl E. Weick, Mindfulness and the Quality of Organizational Attention, in: Organization Science. Vol. 17, nº 4; 514–524.
- 2008, with Karl E Weick, David Obstfeld, Organizing for high reliability: Processes of collective mindfulness, in: Crisis Management. Vol. 3, nº 1; 81–123.
- 2013, with Scott Sonenshein, Jane E. Dutton, Adam M. Grant, and Gretchen M. Spreitzer, ‘’Growing at Work: Employees' Interpretations of Progressive Self-Change in Organizations’’, in: Organization Science. Vol. 24, nº 2; 552–570.
- 2014, with Timothy J. Vogus, Naomi B. Rothman, and Karl E. Weick, The affective foundations of high-reliability organizing, in: Journal of Organizational Behavior. Vol. 35, nº 4; 592–596.

== See also ==
- High reliability organization
- Organizational theory
- Applied psychology
- Risk Management
- Resilience (organizational)
- Change Management
