= Administrative Science Quarterly =

- Cover page, June 2012
- Discipline: Management
- Language: English
- Edited by: Christine Beckman

Publication details
- History: 1956–present
- Publisher: SAGE Publications for the Samuel Curtis Johnson Graduate School of Management, Cornell University
- Frequency: Quarterly
- Impact factor: 10.4 (2022)

Standard abbreviations
- ISO 4: Adm. Sci. Q.

Indexing
- CODEN: ASCQAG
- ISSN: 0001-8392 (print); 1930-3815 (web)
- LCCN: 57059226
- JSTOR: 00018392
- OCLC no.: 01461102

Links
- Journal homepage; Journal page at publisher website; Online archive

Administrative Science Quarterly is a peer-reviewed academic journal covering the field of organizational studies. The journal was established in 1956 and is published by SAGE Publications for the Samuel Curtis Johnson Graduate School of Management at Cornell University. In 2007, it was ranked as the #16 academic journal in business by Financial Times.

== Scope ==
Administrative Science Quarterly publishes theoretical and empirical papers based on dissertations as well as the work of more established scholars. The interdisciplinary journal also contains work in organizational theory, and informative book reviews.

== Abstracting and indexing ==
Administrative Science Quarterly is abstracted and indexed in, among other databases: SCOPUS, and the Social Sciences Citation Index. According to the Journal Citation Reports, its 2022 impact factor is 10.4, ranking it 19th out of 227 journals in the category 'Management', and 19th out of 154 journals in the category 'Business'.
