= Sensemaking =

Giving meaning to collective experiences

Sensemaking or sense-making is the process by which people give meaning to their collective experiences. It has been defined as "the ongoing retrospective development of plausible images that rationalize what people are doing" (Weick, Sutcliffe, & Obstfeld, 2005, p. 409). The concept was introduced to organizational studies by Karl E. Weick in the late 1960's and has affected both theory and practice. Weick intended to encourage a shift away from the traditional focus of organization theorists on decision-making and towards the processes that constitute the meaning of the decisions that are enacted in behavior.

== Definition ==
There is no single agreed upon definition of sensemaking, but there is consensus that it is a process that allows people to understand ambiguous, equivocal or confusing issues or events. Disagreements about the meaning of sensemaking exist around whether sensemaking is a mental process within the individual, a social process or a process that occurs as part of discussion; whether it is an ongoing daily process or only occurs in response to rare events; and whether sensemaking describes past events or considers the future. Sensemaking further refers not only to a process, be it mental or social, that occurs in organizations but also a broader perspective on what organization is and what it means for people to be organized. Overall five distinct schools of sensemaking/sense-making have been identified.

== Roots in organizational psychology ==
In 1966, Daniel Katz and Robert L. Kahn published The Social Psychology of Organizations (Katz & Kahn, 1966). In 1969, Karl Weick played on this title in his book The Social Psychology of Organizing, shifting the focus from organizations as entities to organizing as an activity. It was especially the second edition, published ten years later (Weick, 1979) that established Weick's approach in organization studies.

== Weick's approach to sensemaking ==
Weick identified seven properties of sensemaking (Weick, 1995):

1. Identity and identification is central – who people think they are in their context shapes what they enact and how they interpret events (Pratt, 2000; Currie & Brown, 2003; Weick, et al., 2005; Thurlow & Mills, 2009; Watson, 2009).
2. Retrospection provides the opportunity for sensemaking: the point of retrospection in time affects what people notice (Dunford & Jones, 2000), thus attention and interruptions to that attention are highly relevant to the process (Gephart, 1993).
3. People enact the environments they face in dialogues and narratives (Bruner, 1991; Watson, 1998; Currie & Brown, 2003). As people speak, and build narrative accounts, it helps them understand what they think, organize their experiences and control and predict events (Isabella, 1990; Weick, 1995; Abolafia, 2010) and reduce complexity in the context of change management (Kumar & Singhal, 2012).
4. Sensemaking is a social activity in that plausible stories are preserved, retained or shared (Isabella, 1990; Maitlis, 2005). However, the audience for sensemaking includes the speakers themselves (Watson, 1995) and the narratives are "both individual and shared...an evolving product of conversations with ourselves and with others" (Currie & Brown, 2003: 565).
5. Sensemaking is ongoing, so Individuals simultaneously shape and react to the environments they face. As they project themselves onto this environment and observe the consequences they learn about their identities and the accuracy of their accounts of the world (Thurlow & Mills, 2009). This is a feedback process so even as individuals deduce their identity from the behaviour of others towards them, they also try to influence this behaviour. As Weick argued, "The basic idea of sensemaking is that reality is an ongoing accomplishment that emerges from efforts to create order and make retrospective sense of what occurs" (Weick, 1993: 635).
6. People extract cues from the context to help them decide on what information is relevant and what explanations are acceptable (Salancick & Pfeffer, 1978; Brown, Stacey, & Nandhakumar, 2007). Extracted cues provide points of reference for linking ideas to broader networks of meaning and are 'simple, familiar structures that are seeds from which people develop a larger sense of what may be occurring." (Weick, 1995: 50).
7. People favour plausibility over accuracy in accounts of events and contexts (Currie & Brown, 2003; Brown, 2005; Abolafia, 2010): "in an equivocal, postmodern world, infused with the politics of interpretation and conflicting interests and inhabited by people with multiple shifting identities, an obsession with accuracy seems fruitless, and not of much practical help, either" (Weick, 1995: 61).

Each of these seven aspects interact and intertwine as individuals interpret events. Their interpretations become evident through narratives – written and spoken – which convey the sense they have made of events (Currie & Brown, 2003), as well as through diagrammatic reasoning and associated material practices (Huff, 1990; Stigliani & Ravasi, 2012).

=== From decision-making to sensemaking ===
The rise of the sensemaking perspective marks a shift of focus in organization studies from how decisions shape organizations to how meaning drives organizing (Weick, 1993). The aim was to focus attention on the largely cognitive activity of framing experienced situations as meaningful. It is a collaborative process of creating shared awareness and understanding out of different individuals' perspectives and varied interests. Weick described the social and historical context in the late 1960s as being important in this shift from decision-making to sensemaking: "These ideas coincided with a growing societal realization that administrators in Washington were trying to justify committing more resources to a war in Vietnam that the United States was clearly losing. One could not escape the feeling that rationality had a demonstrable retrospective core, that people looked forward with anxiety and put the best face on it after the fact, and that the vaunted prospective skills of McNamara’s “whiz kids” in the Pentagon were a chimera. It was easy to put words to this mess. People create their own fate. Organizations enact their own environments. The point seemed obvious."

=== From planning to action ===
Sensemaking scholars are less interested in the intricacies of planning than in the details of action (Weick, 1995, p. 55).

=== Uncertainty, ambiguity, and crisis ===
The sensemaking approach is often used to provide insight into factors that surface as organizations address either uncertain or ambiguous situations (Weick 1988, 1993; Weick et al., 2005), including deep uncertainty. Beginning in the 1980s with an influential re-analysis of the Bhopal disaster, Weick's name has come to be associated with the study of the situated sensemaking that influences the outcomes of disasters (Weick 1993).

== Categories and related concepts ==
A 2014 review of the literature on sensemaking in organizations identified a dozen different categories of sensemaking and a half-dozen sensemaking related concepts (Maitlis & Christianson, 2014). The categories of sensemaking included: constituent-minded, cultural, ecological, environmental, future-oriented, intercultural, interpersonal, market, political, prosocial, prospective, and resourceful. The sensemaking-related concepts included: sensebreaking, sensedemanding, sense-exchanging, sensegiving, sensehiding, and sense specification.

Another 2014 review of related publications from various organization and business journals identified five ways in which the sensemaking perspectives in organizational studies is constituted in research. These five are that sensemaking is confined to specific episodes, is triggered by ambiguous events, occurs through specific processes, generates particular outcomes, and is influenced by specific situational factors.

== Other applications ==
Sensemaking is central to the conceptual framework for military network-centric operations (NCO) espoused by the United States Department of Defense (Garstka and Alberts, 2004). In a joint/coalition military environment, sensemaking is complicated by numerous technical, social, organizational, cultural, and operational factors. A central hypothesis of NCO is that the quality of shared sensemaking and collaboration will be better in a "robustly networked" force than in a platform-centric force, empowering people to make better decisions. According to NCO theory, there is a mutually-reinforcing relationship among and between individual sensemaking, shared sensemaking, and collaboration.

In defense applications, sensemaking theorists have primarily focused on how shared awareness and understanding are developed within command and control organizations at the operational level. At the tactical level, individuals monitor and assess their immediate physical environment in order to predict where different elements will be in the next moment. At the operational level, where the situation is far broader, more complex and more uncertain, and evolves over hours and days, the organization must collectively make sense of enemy dispositions, intentions and capabilities, as well as anticipate the (often unintended) effects of own-force actions on a complex system of systems.

Sensemaking has been studied in the patient safety literature (Battles, et al. 2006). It has been used as a conceptual framework for identifying and detecting high risk patient situations. For example, Rhodes, et al. (2015) examined sensemaking and the co-production of safety of primary medical care patients.

== See also ==
- Abductive reasoning – Inference seeking the simplest and most likely explanation
- Brenda Dervin – American academic
- Concept map – Diagram showing relationships among concepts
- Cynefin framework – Decision-making framework
- Idea networking
- Institutional logic – Concept in sociological theory
- Kathleen M. Sutcliffe – American academic (born 1950)
- Knowledge management – Processing of knowledge to accomplish organizational goals
- Meaning-making – Process of understanding changes in life
- Problem structuring methods – Techniques used to model a situation to be changed
- Reflective equilibrium – State of balance among a set of beliefs, arrived at by considering general principles
- Semiotics – Study of signs
