= Intervention =

Intervention, Interventions, The Intervention, or An Intervention may refer to:

== Entertainment ==
=== Film and television ===
- Intervention (1968 film), a Russian film
- Intervention (2007 film), a British film
- The Intervention, a 2008 film starring Dwier Brown
- The Intervention (film), a 2016 American film
- Intervention (TV series), an American documentary series
- Intervention Canada, a spinoff of the American series
- "Intervention" (Buffy the Vampire Slayer), a 2001 episode
- "Intervention" (Doctors), a 2005 episode
- "Intervention" (How I Met Your Mother), a 2008 episode
- "Intervention" (Stargate Universe), a 2010 episode
- The Intervention, a 2008 Australian TV documentary about the Northern Territory National Emergency Response
- Canine Intervention, a 2021 reality TV show

=== Music ===
- Intervention (album), a 2007 album by Finest Hour
- The Intervention (EP), a 2009 album by The Color Fred
- The Intervention, the film score for the 2016 film of the same name, by Tegan and Sarah
- "Intervention" (song), a 2006 song by Arcade Fire
- "Intervention", a song by Dope from the album Felons and Revolutionaries
- "Intervention", a 2003 song by Madonna from American Life
- "Intervention", a 2012 song by Nine Lashes from the album World We View
- "Intervention", a 2011 song by Silverstein from the album Rescue
- "Intervention", a song by Soulfly from the album Enslaved
- Interventions (Carter), a 2007 composition for solo piano and orchestra by the American composer Elliott Carter
- Interventions, a 2016 album by the Horse Lords

=== Other entertainment ===
- "Intervention" (convention), an annual Internet Culture convention held in Rockville, Maryland
- Intervention (musical), 2007 musical by Matt Corriel and Jill Jaysen
- An Intervention, a 2014 play by Mike Bartlett
- Intervention, a 1987 science fiction novel in the Galactic Milieu Series by Julian May
- Intervention, a 2009 medical thriller novel in the Jack Stapleton and Laurie Montgomery series by Robin Cook

== International relations, law, and politics ==
- Allied intervention in the Russian Civil War, took place 1918–1925
- Federal intervention, a legal concept in Argentina
- Humanitarian intervention, an attempt to reduce suffering of a specific state that is facing a domestic armed conflict
- Intervention (international law), the use of force by one country or sovereign state in the internal or external affairs of another sovereign state or states
- Intervention (law), a legal procedure for a nonparty to enter an ongoing lawsuit
- Interventionism (politics), a policy of aggressive activity undertaken by a geo-political jurisdiction to alter the internal dynamics of a certain society
- Market intervention, when a central bank buys or sells foreign currencies in an attempt to adjust their exchange rates
- Military offensive or invasion of a sovereign state
- Northern Territory National Emergency Response, a.k.a. "The Intervention", changes to welfare by the Australian government in 2007

== Social sciences and health ==
- Medical intervention, therapy to treat health problems
- Psychological intervention, any action by psychological professionals designed to bring about change in a client
  - Cognitive interventions, a set of techniques and therapies practiced in counseling
  - Intervention (counseling), an attempt to compel a subject to "get help" for an addiction or other problem
- Intervention theory, used in social studies and social policy to refer to the decision making problems of intervening effectively in a situation in order to secure desired outcomes
- Human Systems Intervention, the design and implementation of interventions in social settings where adults are confronted with the need to change their perspectives, attitudes, and actions
- Public health intervention, an effort to promote good health behaviour or to prevent bad health behaviour
- Intervention (consulting), term used in the field of organizational development
- Intervention (journal), a journal published by Medknow Publications

== Other ==
- Art intervention, an interaction with a previously existing artwork, audience, or venue
- CheyTac Intervention, a bolt-action anti-materiel rifle
- Interventions (Houellebecq book), a book by Michel Houellebecq, published in 1998 and expanded in 2009 and 2020
- Interventions (Chomsky book), a 2007 book by Noam Chomsky
- Interventions, an imprint of Ohio State University Press

== See also ==
- Divine providence
- Interventionism (disambiguation)
- Interventions + Lullabies, a 2003 album by The Format
- Interventions: A Life in War and Peace, a 2012 memoir by Kofi Annan
- Intervention study
