= Human systems engineering =

Aspect of systems psychology

Human systems engineering (HSE) is a field based on systems theory intended as a structured approach to influencing the intangible reality in organizations in a desirable direction. HSE claims to turn complexity into an advantage, to ease innovation processes in organizations and to master problems rooted in negative emotions and a lack of motivation. It is taught in the Master of Advanced Studies program of the University of Applied Sciences Western Switzerland (HES-SO) as a complementary and postgraduate program for students who have already achieved a bachelor level or an MBA.

Recently, after the crisis of the Swiss banking system due to whistle blowing and to the stealing and selling to intelligence services of sensitive data by bank personnel, numerous articles featured "human risks" as a major problem in organisations. According to de:Lutz von Rosenstiel the "lack of meaning" and conflicts between personal and organisational values systems is becoming increasingly a problem; people have not any more the feeling to "belong" to an organization if every relation is to be seen as a commercial interaction. Chris Argyris sees the same problem from the point of view of learning interactions between the organization and personnel, where the organization expects from its personnel to learn in order to fulfil jobs, but the organization is not prepared to learn from its personnel through double-loop learning.

To handle these issues, in HSE, the organization is seen as a living system according to J.G. Millers theory of open and self organizing systems. In HSE, the 3 systemic levels "individual", "group" and "organization" are considered as main entities and targets to influence, whereas the levels "society" and "supranational system" supply the criteria for a positive insertion of the organization in its environment. This approach is intended to help managers to understand the organization as a complex and organic system where functional relations, hierarchy and processes are only the visible and tangible part of the "iceberg". HSE claims the invisible part is as important as the tangible and structural aspects of the organizations. HSE sees the invisible as the unconscious part of both the individual and the organization as a collective entity. Fritjof Capra describes the subtle interactions between the tangible and the invisible in one of his books.

From an epistemological point of view HSE refers explicitly to Edgar Morin's proposal to link sciences and practices and to Jean Piaget's concept of "transdisciplinarity".

As a result of the program, human risks and the resources deriving from a positive interaction are now better understood.

HSE was first launched in French in 2002 at the University of Applied Sciences Western Switzerland and in 2004 at the Zurich University of Applied Sciences in German language.

The program was founded in 2002 by two professors of the university:

- Prof. Christa Muth PhD, who did several years research in organizational psychosociology and was developer of the Leonardo 3.4.5 methodology for strategy analysis in relation with team-members thought patterns. Muth was the main conceptor of HSE.
- Prof. Marie-France Bourdais, specialist in communication and coaching, joined the team at an early stage and contributed her experience in using Neuro-linguistic-programming for modelling human and business processes.

The program in Zürich was abandoned after a few years. In 2018, the French program was renamed "Développement Humain dans les Organisations" (human development in organizations).

Recently Massachusetts Institute of Technology started using the term "Human Systems Engineering" in its Engineering Systems Division, putting the focus on how people and organizations, conceive, develop and handle technological systems. Specialised courses focus on topics such as "The Human Side of Technology" or more human risk oriented courses as for example "Managing Nuclear Technology".

A similar program exists at Concordia University in Canada: Human Systems Intervention.

Several departments and academic programs at the Georgia Institute of Technology focus on Human Systems Engineering and related theory. Namely their Masters program in Human Computer Interaction, which explores intersections of industrial design, psychology, interactive computing, and media, and the professional education short course "Introduction to Human Systems Integration," which considers Human Systems Engineering as it relates to addressing human-related issues in design. The Georgia Tech Research Institute, the applied research arm of the Georgia Institute of Technology, houses a Human Systems Engineering branch that focuses primarily on applications of Human Systems Engineering in the defense domain.
