= The Fifth Discipline =

1990 book by Peter Senge

The Fifth Discipline: The Art & Practice of the Learning Organization
- Author: Peter Senge
- Language: English
- Publisher: Currency
- Publication date: 1990 (first edition) 2006 (second edition)
- Publication place: United States
- ISBN: 0-385-26095-4 (first edition) ISBN 0-385-51725-4 (second edition)
- OCLC: 318247346

The Fifth Discipline: The Art and Practice of the Learning Organization is a book by Peter Senge about developing learning organizations by focusing on group problem solving using five basic disciplines or "component technologies", the "cornerstone" of which is systems thinking. The other four disciplines are personal mastery, mental models, building shared vision, and team learning.

== Reception ==
In 1997, Harvard Business Review identified The Fifth Discipline as one of the seminal management books of the previous 75 years.

== See also ==
- Agile management
- Learning agenda
- Organizational learning
- System archetype
