= Organizational metacognition =

Organizational metacognition is knowing what an organization knows, a concept related to metacognition, organizational learning, the learning organization and sensemaking. It is used to describe how organizations and teams develop an awareness of their own thinking, learning how to learn, where awareness of ignorance can motivate learning.

The organizational deutero-learning concept identified by Argyris and Schon defines when organizations learn how to carry out single-loop and double-loop learning. It has also been described as learning how to learn through a process of collaborative inquiry and reflection (evaluative inquiry).

"When an organization engages in deutero-learning its members learn about the previous context for learning. They reflect on and inquire into previous episodes of organizational learning, or failure to learn. They discover what they did that facilitated or inhibited learning, they invent new strategies for learning, they produce these strategies, and they evaluate and generalize what they have produced"

Learning what facilitates and inhibits learning enables organizations to develop new strategies to develop their knowledge. For example, identification of a gap between perceived performance (such as satisfaction) and actual performance (outcomes) creates an awareness that makes the organization understand that learning needs to occur, driving appropriate changes to the environment and processes.

== Learning prototypes ==
Wijnhoven (2001) grouped four learning prototypes that best meet learning needs, the match between these needs and learning norms dictating an organization's learning capabilities; deutero-learning is the acquisition of these capabilities.

1. knowledge gap analysis
2. classification of problems to select operationally required knowledge and skills
3. coping with organizational tremors and jolts by anticipation, response and adjustments of behavioural repertoires
4. decisional uncertainty measurement

== Terminological ambiguities ==
Organizational metacognition and organizational deutero-learning have both been described as the concept or phenomenon where organizations learn how to learn. Argyris and Schon (1978) place deutero-learning into their cognitive theory of action framework, neglecting aspects of adaptive behaviour and context core to Bateson's (1972) original definitions. In order to resolve terminological ambiguities, Visser (2007) reviewed and reformulated the concept of deutero-learning as, "the behavioral adaptation to patterns of conditioning in relationships in organizational contexts, distinguishing it from meta-learning and planned learning" (pg. 659).

== Significance ==
Organizational metacognition is considered a key norm to the prescriptive concept of the learning organization. Its significance has been recognized by industry, the military and in disaster response.

== Examples in practice ==
Examples of poor metacognition (deutero-learning) have been described in knowledge network environments,

"Knowledge networking is important to most competitive enterprises today. Enterprise knowledge is becoming ever more specialized in nature, so no single person or organization can know everything in detail. Hence addressing complex, multidisciplinary problems requires developing and accessing a network of knowledgeable people and organizations. The problem is, many otherwise knowledgeable people and organizations are not fully aware of their knowledge networks, and even more problematic, they are not aware that they are not aware. This focuses our attention toward organizational metacognition."
