= Christa Muth =

German systems scientist (born 1949)

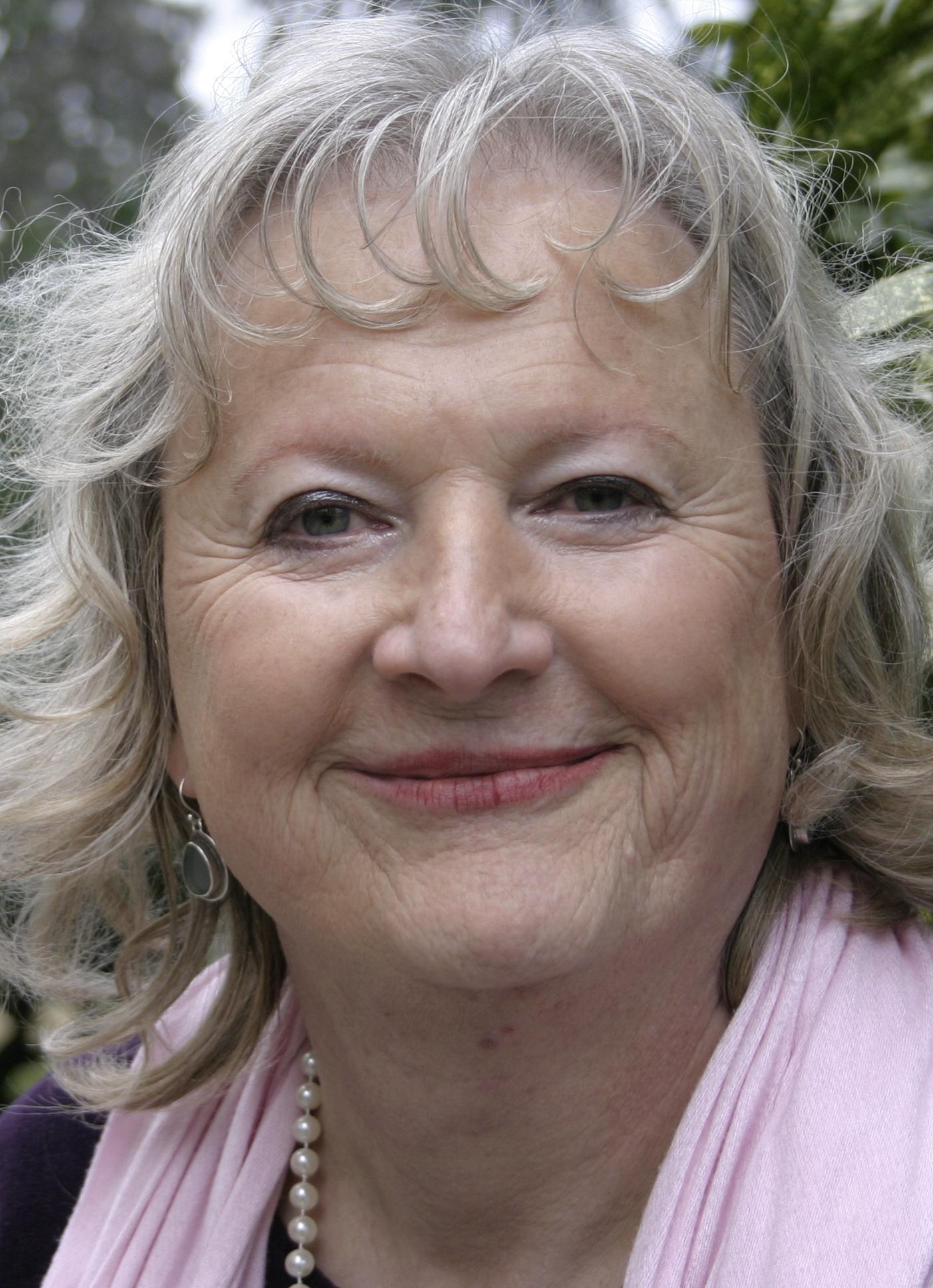
- Muth in 2011
- Born: 24 November 1949 (age 76); Rheydt, Germany

Christa Muth (born November 24, 1949) is a German systems scientist, management professor and management consultant. She spent most of her career in Switzerland where she worked in the field organizational studies, management and system science. She developed the concept of Human System Engineering, which was later used as the name of master of advanced studies program at the HES-SO University of Applied Science Western Switzerland. After transferring responsibility for the program to a successor, she became involved in research and work related to societal innovation.

== Early life and education ==
Muth was born in Rheydt / North Rhine-Westphalia, a borough of Mönchengladbach in a family of textile industrials. Their Lutheran faith led the family of her maternal grandfather to refuse the membership in the NSDAP Party, which endangered her family and brought troubles during the era of the Third Reich. After the end of World War II in 1945, there came 15 years of booming success and wealth in part due to business with the Allied forces which privileged partners who had not been Nazis. In 1960, when it was clear that the German textile industry would get into heavy troubles under the pressure of Asiatic competition, Muth's mother dropped her ,job and withdrew out of this branch. She moved with her second husband to the Lausanne area. Hence, Muth was educated in the French and later in the Italian speaking area of Switzerland. She gained her diploma for access to university in Bellinzona. She studied Economic History and Sociology at the Geneva University where she had the opportunity to work and share ideas with intellectuals like Edgar Morin, Jean Ziegler, Jean Piaget and Paolo Freire. Muth earned her Ph.D. in 1991 at the Swiss Campus of La Jolla University, San Diego, where she attended lectures with Paul Watzlawick and Henri Laborit. Her doctoral thesis (in German) was about private and public academic education (Erfolg und Marketing von Privatuniversitäten).

Since 2012, Muth has been domiclied on Salagnon Island, having previously lived in Yverdon-les-Bains. She has also maintained a personal connection with the island owner.

In 1960, Muth Mother, who had been expected to succeed her father in managing the family silk business, decided not take over its operations. Having worked as a corporate representative and travelled to meet clients, she was familiar with the changing conditions facing the textile industry. She subsequently married a swiss national and moved to the Lausanne area. The family business discontinued silk production, sold its machinery and remainding stock and laid off its employees. The premises were subsequently rented for other uses. Between 2015 to 2019, Muth was involved in the process of selling the former business premises.

Since 2012, Muth has been do

== Professional experience ==
In the post ’68 movement, Muth opted for a politically liberal attitude promoting alternative businesses rather than violent confrontation with the system. In her view, these businesses had the advantage to develop an in depth understanding of the realities and constraints in management rather than judging and condemn. She initiated several businesses or assisted interested groups in the launch. The condition for her participation was always a participative or better self-governed management model (autogestion). The objectives of the initiatives in which she participated invariably focused on sustainability, empowerment and creating jobs for those who were in trouble finding appropriate work in line with their values.

Despite her values and intentions, Muth was harshly criticized because of her management style which was perceived by some as pseudo-democratic and authoritarian.

Some of the businesses she started have survived until today, the most notable and where she had a leading role as founder-manager for 6 years is probably Voyages APN in Geneva, originally a travel agency and coach transport company in the legal form of a cooperative. Ten years after her departure from this company the staff took over the company, discarded the form of the cooperative and instated private ownership.

== Development of management and strategy concepts ==
Later, Muth was active in technology valorization, M&A, succession management and organization development. From a methodological point of view, Muth was strongly influenced by Systems thinking (Frederic Vester and James Grier Miller), the model of the triune brain (Paul D. MacLean), Existential Analysis (Viktor Frankl) and by the sociological research carried out by Mihaly Csikszentmihalyi. In her role as main researcher and developer for the Leonardo 3.4.5 methodology she condensed this knowledge into a tool intended to help organizations to master complexity and to assess organizational strategies in relation with mental patterns of management teams. This methodology was developed as a Eureka project with the participation of research teams in Switzerland, UK, Italy, Germany and France.

From 2003 to 2009, Muth was President of the Association of the Swiss Printing Industry. At this time she committed herself to reorient the printing industry to Sustainable Development providing the branch with analysis and concepts for survival in the context of globalization. The Association became leader in industrial sustainability policies (CO_{2} free printing), refusing the alibi of compensation certificates.

== Contributions to the changes in the Swiss universities system ==
In 1993, Muth was hired as a consultant to esig+ (Ecole Suisse d’Ingénieurs de l’Industrie Graphique et de l’emballage – Swiss College of Engineering for the Printing and Packaging Industry). The School had the ambition to become the first College at University level to achieve an ISO 9001 quality certification. To do so a turnaround in the organization culture and in the teaching methods was necessary. Hence her blend of knowledge in neuroscience, learning biology, psychology, systems sciences and organization development was the perfect match. During the quality certification, esig+ became the main model for Rolf Dubs who was at this time the mentor of the Swiss Confederation for the development of the Universities of Applied Sciences. Muth was asked for extensive input about her futuristic vision of teaching and leading academic institutions. She participated as a member of the esig+ management staff in the whole process of development in Dubs' work group. Muth strongly advocated to include soft skills and social competence in academic curricula and to transform the teaching methods and relations between faculty and students accordingly. Many innovations in the academic context, like the possibility to do diploma or master thesis’ in groups are due to her determination to challenge and oppose academic traditions.

In 2000, esig+ was merged into HEIG-VD as department Comem+ (Communications Engineering Management) and Muth was asked to package the type of knowledge she used for the turnaround of esig+ in order to make it transmissible and teachable in a Master of Advanced Studies (MAS).

== Human Systems Engineering ==
In 1999 Muth received the assignment from the university to create a Master Program for extended education focused on intangible factors in organizations. She coined the term Human Systems Engineering and set up the first conceptual lineaments of the iter studiorum. Later, Prof. Marie-France Bourdais joined her to design, to promote the final version of the program and to run it with the first cohorts of students. HSE became quite popular and received a warm welcome from business and financial press. Later it was enriched with several specialization courses. After directing HSE until 2008, Muth organized her succession before her transition and handed the direction to her colleague Prof. Marie-France Bourdais.

== Transition ==
Muth was aware of her gender dysphoria since her earliest childhood and attempted several times to transition without success; rigid values in her social, professional and family context, shame and fear prevented a coming out. Well informed psychological help was not available at this time, practitioners just felt uneasy being confronted with this type of request. As a first attempt to transition at the age of 32 Muth lived 4 months as a woman, but this attempt failed as she felt that her passing was not sufficient and there was no support nor perspective for a professional life as a trans woman. After a long period of bedridden sickness at the age of 57, she realized that there was no escape from facing her fate if she wanted to survive. In the meantime, an informed community had established on the Internet where she found the necessary information about how to handle her case, about knowledgeable practitioners and experienced surgeons. From the final decision to surgery only one year lapsed. Muth had her surgery with Dr. Preecha Tiewtranon in Bangkok before her social and professional coming out, which she did 4 months later. The whole process took place under the public eye, as Muth went on lecturing and facing her professional responsibilities.

During her transition, Muth has been followed with the camera by Laurence Périgaud, a member of the Anthropology Institute of the University of Neuchâtel. Her documentary film was selected for the Swiss international festival Visions du réel. « Between Two Spirit - Becoming a Woman at Sixty » shows a successful transition as search of freedom and individuation as Jung intended it.

Since her transition, Muth takes an active part in the debate around transgender issues and is an active member of the TGNS (TransGender Network Switzerland).

== Societal innovation ==
After her transition, Muth developed a new area of academic interest in societal innovation, arguing that too many ideas about how to solve societal issues are just discarded or forgotten because of conservative mindsets in business and politics. Hence she started the “Houses of ... Initiative”, intended to illuminate societal problems and demonstrate their solutions. On this basis she was asked to join the committee of the Project 2020 of Alliance F, the Central Swiss Women's Association. In the field of societal innovation, Muth has issued three thesis’:

== Home life ==
Muth is single and lives in Yverdon-les-Bains, a thermal resort in the Canton Vaud.
