= Nader Mousavizadeh =

Commentator and businessman

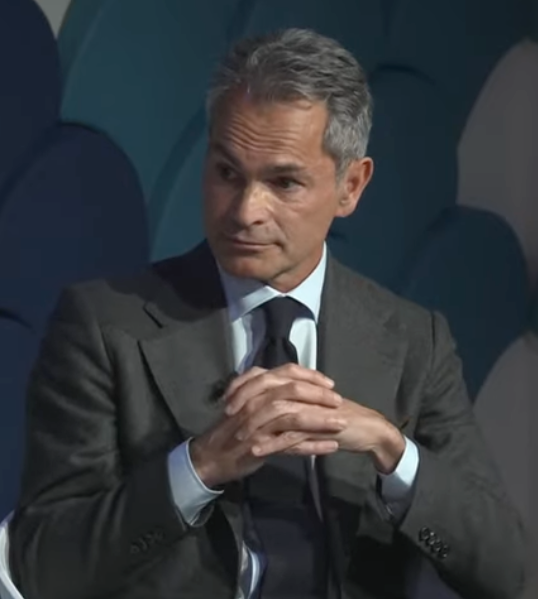
- At the WEF Annual Meeting in 2025
- Education: Harvard College; Massachusetts Institute of Technology; Christ Church College
- Occupations: Businessman, writer

Nader Mousavizadeh is a businessman, author, geo-political advisor and commentator, and former senior United Nations official who was an advisor to Secretary-General of the United Nations Kofi Annan from 1997 to 2003. According to Perry Anderson in the London Review of Books, Mousavizadeh was one of Annan's two key advisers in this period, alongside Edward Mortimer.

Nader grew up in Denmark. He moved to the United States where he studied at Harvard College and the Massachusetts Institute of Technology, and then moved to the United Kingdom where he was a Rhodes Scholar at Christ Church College, University of Oxford.

Before becoming the special assistant to Kofi Annan in 1997, he was a UN political officer in Bosnia-Herzegovina.

Prior to founding Macro Advisory Partners in 2013, of which he is the CEO, Mousavizadeh was a banker at Goldman Sachs and was CEO of Oxford Analytica.

Mousavizadeh is the co-author, with Kofi Annan, of the latter's 2012 memoir, Interventions: A Life in War and Peace, and is the editor of The Black Book Of Bosnia: The Consequences Of Appeasement which is a collection of commentary pieces published in The New Republic of which he was assistant editor at the time. He has also written for The Financial Times, The New York Times, The Times of London, and Foreign Policy, and was a foreign columnist for Reuters.

Since 2019, Mousavizadeh is a member of the Global Board of Directors of the World Resources Institute. He sits on the Trilateral Commission.
