= Society for Organizational Learning =

The Society for Organizational Learning (SoL) is an American organization founded in 1997 by Peter Senge. It replaced the Center for Organizational Learning at MIT. From 1999 until 2016, SoL published its own journal, "Reflections". Its European Counterpart was the European Consortium for the Learning Organisation (ECLO), established in Brussels in 1990. It was founded by several European multinationals as a response to the US orientated approach of Peter Senge with a special emphasis to the European complexity of regions, nations, history, tradition, etc. Its Journal "The Learner" and its electronic version "eLearner" were among the oldest publications in this field. SoL communities have emerged around the world, including in France, Sweden, and Singapore. Global coordination of SoL is done by the GASC (Global Association of SoL Communities), also known as Global SoL.

This non-profit organisation creates a society of members dedicated to respecting the principles of SOL in the objective of achieving interdependent development of one another. These principles revolve around well-being and performance, a drive to learn, transparency, the need to align with nature, cross-organizational, cross-cultural and cross-generational collaboration, as well as the belief that learning is social.

== Sustainability Consortium ==
SoL had a "Sustainability Consortium" which helped large corporations including Unilever, Coca-Cola, Seventh Generation, and Schlumberger share ideas and tackle common issues related to sustainability. The ECLO regularly cooperated with EU projects to promote the idea of sustainable learning, conceptualizing projects, and disseminating its results.
