= Team learning =

Group Education

Team learning is the collaborative effort to achieve a common goal within the group. The aim of team learning is to attain the objective through dialogue and discussion, conflicts and defensive routines, and practice within the group. In the same way, indigenous communities of the Americas exhibit a process of collaborative learning.

Teams need to discover their own formula for success regularly. Team learning is the collective learning process that helps effective teams in doing so; one common tool used is a learning agenda.

== Organizational learning ==
Teamwork is the process of working collectively to achieve a common objective in a group. In the learning organization context, team members tend to share knowledge and complement each other's skills. If there is no commitment and effort from team members, then working and learning from team work may fail. Diversity increases the potency of team learning, but requires strong team identification.

Team learning is also associated with a team leader which can be defined as the following:

A team leader is someone who provides guidance, instruction, direction and leadership to a group of other individuals (the team) for the purpose of achieving a key result or group of aligned results. The team leader reports to a project manager (overseeing several teams). The team leader monitors the quantitative and qualitative result that is to be achieved. The leader often works within the team, as a member, carrying out the same roles but with the additional 'leader' responsibilities (as opposed to higher-level management who often have a separate job role altogether). In order for a team to function successfully, the team leader must also motivate the team to "use their knowledge and skills to achieve the shared goals." When a team leader motivates a team, group members can function in a successful and goal-oriented manner.

Scouller (2011) defined the purpose of a leader (including a team leader) as follows: "The purpose of a leader is to make sure there is a leadership ... to ensure that all four dimensions of leadership are [being addressed]." The four dimensions being: (1) a shared, motivating team purpose or vision or goal (2) action, progress and results (3) collective unity or team spirit (4) attention to individuals.

The team members may not directly report or answer to the team leader (often a senior member of the organization but may or may not be a manager), but would be expected to provide support to the team leader and other team members in achieving the team's goals.

A good team leader listens constructively to the membership and to the customer(s) of the results that the team is charged with delivering.

Aligned with listening skills, team leaders are responsible for developing intervention techniques to improve overall team production. Shuffler (2011) claims that specific teams have interventions distinctly particular to their own team. Also, team building is most effective for solving specific team breakdowns, whereas team training is most effective for providing the knowledge and skills needed for teamwork.

=== Disciplines ===
- Dialogue and Discussion
- Conflicts and Defensive Routines
- Practice
- Learning new skills

== Indigenous American ways of learning ==
Collaboration or Team Learning in Indigenous groups in the Americas can be described by a multifaceted model based on informal learning. Learning by observing and pitching in (LOPI), where children are active participants within their communities. This gives children the opportunity to work alongside people varying in age while meaningfully contributing to community and family goals. Children can take on tasks that can suit their skills. In this kind of behavior children pay no importance to hierarchy when attempting to complete a task and can fluidly take lead within the group and step back if they lack the knowledge to continue, allowing another to take the lead. The intent of collaboration is due to the reciprocity in Indigenous social relationships, and the cultural value system of being helpful (acomedido/a).

Researchers had looked at teamwork within children from indigenous and middle-class communities from Cheran, Mexico as well as children from the large metropolitan city Guadalajara, Mexico. They had found that the closer the child's background was to indigenous roots the more likely they were to collaborate and at a higher rate than those from a middle-class background. Children were in teams and given turns but instead of considering each turn as an individual game as some groups from middle-class communities had used each move as a way for the team to advance. Similar results were found in children working together to form a 3-D bee puzzle. In this study they had found that Mexican heritage children collaborated about 72% of the 30 second time segments. Children are also able to recognize the collaborative cultural patterns by watching others working together.

In an indigenous Mazahua Mexican community, school children show responsibility, initiative, and autonomy by contributing in their classroom by completing classroom activities as a whole class, assisting, and correcting their teacher during lectures. The collaborative effort of the Mazahua students was necessary in order to achieve the goals of the class.

Collaboration has a strong influence on children's home life as well. In Mexico children were likely to contribute to family household chores and considered it as an opportunity to develop solidarity within the family while expressing pride in working along with family members. In Gaskin's recollection of an 18-month toddler trying to help around her family's home, moving from place to place, task to task until she is able to find something that she can do on her own. The young girl is not told what to do unless her health or safety might be in danger. She shows interest in helping around the home and continues to look for ways to help.

Nocutzepo families integrate children and youth in family and community practices, such as managing store businesses, preparing food for food stands, and taking care of younger children. Children in the Nocutzepo community are not shied away from contributing, as all of their contributions are welcomed; if their contributions are insufficient, children are still continually encouraged to contribute with improvements
