= Chris Argyris =

American management scientist (1923–2013)

- Born: July 16, 1923; Newark, New Jersey
- Died: November 16, 2013 (aged 90)
- Known for: double-loop learning intervention theory

Academic background
- Education: Clark University; University of Kansas; Cornell University
- Thesis: A study of a pattern of managerial leadership (1951)
- Doctoral advisor: William F. Whyte

Academic work
- Discipline: organization development organizational learning
- Institutions: Yale University; Harvard University; Monitor Deloitte

Chris Argyris (pronounced AHR-JUR-ris) (July 16, 1923 – November 16, 2013) was an American business theorist and professor at Yale School of Management and Harvard Business School. Argyris, like Richard Beckhard, Edgar Schein and Warren Bennis, is known as a pioneer of organization development, and known for seminal work on learning organizations.

== Biography ==
Argyris was born a twin, along with Thomas S. Argyris (1923–2001), into a family of Greek immigrants to the United States in Newark, New Jersey. Argyris grew up in Irvington, New Jersey, and Athens, Greece. In World War II he served in the U.S. Army Signal Corps. After his military service he studied psychology at Clark University, where he met Kurt Lewin. He obtained his MA in 1947, and joined the University of Kansas, where he obtained his MSc in Psychology and Economics in 1949. In 1951 received his PhD from Cornell University, with a thesis under the supervision of William F. Whyte on organizational behavior.

In 1951 Argyris started his academic career at Yale University as part of the Yale Labor and Management Center where he worked under its director and an early influence, E. Wight Bakke. At Yale he subsequently became appointed Professor of Management Science. In 1971 he moved to Harvard University, where he was Professor of Education and Organizational Behavior, until his retirement. Argyris was active as director of the consulting firm Monitor Deloitte in Cambridge, Massachusetts.

Argyris received an Honorary Doctor of Laws degree from the University of Toronto in 2006 and a Doctor of Science award from Yale University in 2011.

Argyris died on November 16, 2013, age 90, and is buried at Linwood Cemetery in Weston, Massachusetts.

== Work ==
The ladder of inference, a metaphorical model of cognition and action created by Chris Argyris. Argyris' original ladder had fewer rungs with different names.

=== Early research ===
Argyris' early research explored the impact of formal organizational structures, control systems and management on individuals and how they responded and adapted to them. This research resulted in the books Personality and Organization (1957) and Integrating the Individual and the Organization (1964). He then shifted his focus to organizational change, in particular exploring the behaviour of senior executives in organizations, in Interpersonal Competence and Organizational Effectiveness (1962) and Organization and Innovation (1965).

From there he moved on to an inquiry into the role of the social scientist as both researcher and actor (Intervention Theory and Method (1970); Inner Contradictions of Rigorous Research (1980) and Action Science (1985) – with Robert Putnam and Diana McLain Smith). His fourth major area of research and theorizing – in significant part undertaken with Donald Schön – was in individual and organizational learning and the extent to which human reasoning, not just behavior, can become the basis for diagnosis and action (Theory in Practice (1974); Organizational Learning (1978); Organizational Learning II (1996) – all with Donald Schön). He has also developed this thinking in Overcoming Organizational Defenses (1990) and Knowledge for Action (1993).

=== Adult personality ===
Argyris believed that managers who treat people positively and as responsible adults will achieve productivity. Mature workers want additional responsibilities, a variety of tasks, and the ability to participate in decision-making. He also came to the conclusion that problems with employees are the result of mature personalities managed using outdated practices.

=== Action science ===
Argyris' collaborative work with Robert W. Putnam, (not to be confused with Robert D. Putnam), and Diana McLain Smith advocates an approach to research that focuses on generating knowledge that is useful in solving practical problems. Other key concepts developed by Argyris include ladder of inference, double-loop learning (Argyris & Schön 1974), theory of action/espoused theory/theory-in-use, high advocacy/high inquiry dialogue and actionable knowledge and the study of adult personality.

Argyris' concept of action science begins with the study of how human beings design their actions in difficult situations. Human actions are designed to achieve intended consequences and governed by a set of environment variables. How those governing variables are treated in designing actions are the key differences between single-loop learning and double-loop learning. When actions are designed to achieve the intended consequences and to suppress conflict about the governing variables, a single-loop learning cycle usually ensues. On the other hand, when actions are taken, not only to achieve the intended consequences, but also to openly inquire about conflict and to possibly transform the governing variables, both single-loop and double-loop learning cycles usually ensue. (Argyris applies single-loop and double-loop learning concepts not only to personal behaviors but also to organizational behaviors in his models.)

Model 1 illustrates how single-loop learning affects human actions. Model 2 describes how double-loop learning affects human actions. The following Model 1 and Model 2 tables introduce these ideas (tables are from Argyris, Putnam & Smith, 1985, Action Science, Ch. 3). Other key books conveying Argyris' approach include Argyris & Schon, 1974 and Argyris, 1970, 1980, 1994).

Table 1, Model 1: Theory-In-Use: defensive reasoning

Governing variables	Action strategies	Consequences for the behavioral world	Consequences for learning	Effectiveness
Define goals and try to achieve them	Design and manage the environment unilaterally (be persuasive, appeal to larger goals)	Actor seen as defensive, inconsistent, incongruent, competitive, controlling, fearful of being vulnerable, manipulative, withholding of feelings, overly concerned about self and others or under concerned about others	Self-sealing	Decreased effectiveness
Maximize winning and minimize losing	Own and control the task (claim ownership of the task, be guardian of definition and execution of task)	Defensive interpersonal and group relationship (dependence upon actor, little additivity, little helping of others)	Single-loop learning	
Minimize generating or expressing negative feelings	Unilaterally protect yourself (speak with inferred categories accompanied by little or no directly observable behavior, be blind to impact on others and to the incongruity between rhetoric and behavior, reduce incongruity by defensive actions such as blaming, stereotyping, suppressing feelings, intellectualizing)	Defensive norms (mistrust, lack of risk taking, conformitment, emphasis on diplomacy, power-centered competition, and rivalry)	Little testing of theories publicly, much testing of theories privately	
Be rational	Unilaterally protect others from being hurt (withhold information, create rules to censor information and behavior, hold private meetings)	Little freedom of choice, internal commitment, or risk taking		

Table 2, Model 2: Theory-In-Use: productive reasoning

Governing variables	Action strategies	Consequences for the behavioral world	Consequences for learning	Consequences for quality of life	Effectiveness
Valid information	Design situations or environments where participants can be origins and can experience high personal causation (psychological success, confirmation, essentiality)	Actor experienced as minimally defensive (facilitator, collaborator, choice creator)	Disconfirmable processes	Quality of life will be more positive than negative (high authenticity and high freedom of choice)	
Free and informed choice	Tasks are controlled jointly	Minimally defensive interpersonal relations and group dynamics	Double-loop learning	effectiveness of problem solving and decision making will be great, especially for difficult problems	Increase long-run effectiveness
Internal commitment to the choice and constant monitoring of its implementation	Protection of self is a joint enterprise and oriented toward growth (speak in directly observable categories, seek to reduce blindness about own inconsistency and incongruity)	Learning-oriented norms (trust, individuality, open confrontation on difficult issues)	Public testing of theories	effectiveness of problem solving and decision making will be great, especially for difficult problems	
	Bilateral protection of others				

Reference models I and II

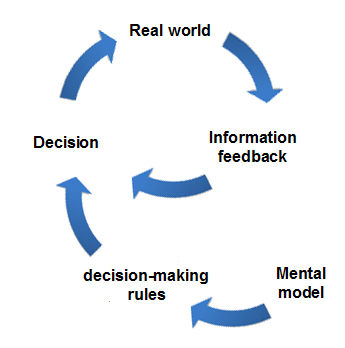
A graphical interpretation of single-loop learning

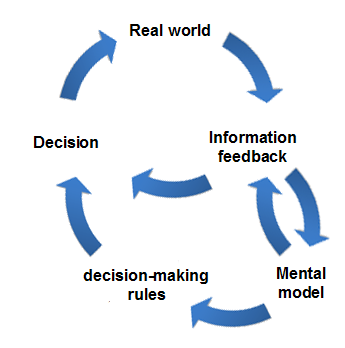
A graphical interpretation of double-loop learning

=== Teaching methods ===
Systems scientist Peter Senge refers to Argyris as a capable teacher whose "skilled practice" enabled his class to observe generalizations and see "subtle patterns of reasoning which underlay our behaviour ... This was exciting."

== Selected books ==
- Argyris, C. 1957. Personality and Organization: the Conflict between System and the Individual. New York: Harper. OCLC 243920
- Argyris, C. 1962. Interpersonal Competence and Organizational Effectiveness. Homewood, Ill.: Dorsey Press. OCLC 254242
- Argyris, C. 1964. Integrating the Individual and the Organization. New York: Wiley. ISBN 0-471-03315-4
- Argyris, C. 1965. Organization and Innovation. Homewood, Ill.: R.D. Irwin. OCLC 228981
- Argyris, C. 1970. Intervention Theory and Method: a Behavioral Science View. Reading, Mass.: Addison-Wesley. ISBN 0-201-00342-2
- Argyris, C. 1971. Management and Organizational Development: the Path from XA to YB. New York: McGraw-Hill. ISBN 0-07-002219-4
- Argyris, C. 1972. The Applicability of Organizational Sociology. Cambridge: Cambridge University Press. ISBN 0-521-08448-2
- Argyris, C. 1974. Behind the Front Page: Organizational Self-Renewal in a Metropolitan Newspaper. San Francisco: Jossey-Bass. ISBN 0-87589-223-X
- Argyris, C., Schön, D.A. 1974. Theory in Practice: Increasing Professional Effectiveness. San Francisco: Jossey-Bass. ISBN 0-87589-230-2
- Argyris, C. 1976. Increasing Leadership Effectiveness. New York: Wiley. ISBN 0-471-01668-3
- Argyris, C. 1978. Regulating Business: the Search for an Optimum. San Francisco: Institute for Contemporary Studies. ISBN 0-917616-27-8
- Argyris, C., Schön, D.A. 1978. Organizational Learning: a Theory of Action Perspective. Reading, Mass.: Addison-Wesley. ISBN 0-201-00174-8
- Argyris, C. 1980. Inner Contradictions of Rigorous Research. New York: Academic Press. ISBN 0-12-060150-8
- Argyris, C. 1982. Reasoning, Learning, and Action: Individual and Organizational. San Francisco: Jossey-Bass. ISBN 0-87589-524-7
- Argyris, Chris (1985). Strategy, change, and defensive routines. Boston: Pitman. ISBN 978-0-273-02329-6.
- Argyris, C., Putnam, R., Smith D.M. 1985. Action Science: Concepts, Methods, and Skills for Research and Intervention. San Francisco: Jossey-Bass. ISBN 0-87589-665-0
- Argyris, C. 1990. Overcoming Organizational Defenses: Facilitating Organizational Learning. Boston: Allyn and Bacon. ISBN 0-205-12338-4
- Argyris, Chris; Schön, Donald A. (1992). Theory in practice: increasing professional effectiveness. San Francisco: Jossey-Bass Publ. ISBN 978-1-55542-446-6.
- Argyris, C. 1993. Knowledge for Action: a Guide to Overcoming Barriers to Organizational Change. San Francisco: Jossey-Bass. ISBN 1-55542-519-4
- Argyris, C. 1993. On Organizational Learning. Cambridge, Mass.: Blackwell. ISBN 1-55786-262-1
- Argyris, C., Schön, D.A. 1996. Organizational Learning II: Theory, Method and Practice. Reading, Mass.: Addison-Wesley. ISBN 0-201-62983-6
- Argyris, C. 1999. On Organizational Learning, 2nd ed. Malden, Mass.: Blackwell Business. ISBN 0-631-21308-2
- Argyris, C. 2000. Flawed Advice and the Management Trap: How Managers Can Know When They're Getting Good Advice and When They're Not. Oxford and New York: Oxford University Press. ISBN 0-19-513286-6
- Argyris, C. 2004. Reasons and Rationalizations: The Limits to Organizational Knowledge. Oxford: Oxford University Press. ISBN 0-19-926807-X
- Argyris, Chris (2010). Organizational traps: leadership, culture, organizational design. Oxford ; New York: Oxford University Press. ISBN 978-0-19-958616-5.

Publications about Chris Argyris

- Argyris, Chris; Putnam, Robert; Smith, Diana McLain (1985). Action Science: Concepts, Methods and Skills for Research and Intervention. San Francisco, CA: Jossey-Bass. ISBN 0-87589-665-0.
- Argyris, Chris; Schön, Donald (1974). Theory in Practice. Increasing professional effectiveness. San Francisco, CA: Jossey-Bass.

== See also ==
- Outline of management
