= Intervention theory =

In social studies and social policy, intervention theory is the analysis of the decision making problems of intervening effectively in a situation in order to secure desired outcomes. Intervention theory addresses the question of when it is desirable not to intervene and when it is appropriate to do so. It also examines the effectiveness of different types of intervention. The term is used across a range of social and medical practices, including health care, child protection and law enforcement. It is also used in business studies.

Within the theory of nursing, intervention theory is included within a larger scope of practice theories. Burns and Grove point out that it directs the implementation of a specific nursing intervention and provides theoretical explanations of how and why the intervention is effective in addressing a particular patient care problem. These theories are tested through programs of research to validate the effectiveness of the intervention in addressing the problem.

In Intervention Theory and Method Chris Argyris argues that in organization development, effective intervention depends on appropriate and useful knowledge that offers a range of clearly defined choices and that the target should be for as many people as possible to be committed to the option chosen and to feel responsibility for it. Overall, interventions should generate a situation in which actors believe that they are working to internal rather than external influences on decisions.

== See also ==
- Cognitive interventions, a set of techniques and therapies practiced in counseling
- Psychological intervention, any action by psychological professionals designed to bring about change in a client
- Health intervention, an effort to promote good health behaviour or to prevent bad health behaviour
- Human Systems Intervention, the design and implementation of interventions in social settings where adults are confronted with the need to change their perspectives, attitudes, and actions
- Intervention (counseling), an attempt to compel a subject to "get help" for an addiction or other problem
- Policy, administrative principles guiding organizational behavior to achieve rational goals
