= Oxford Analytica =

Consulting firm in Oxford, England

Oxford Analytica, Ltd
- Type: Private limited company
- Industry: Management consultancy
- Founded: 1975
- Founders: David Young
- Headquarters: Oxford, England
- Key people: David K. Young (director)
- Website: oxan.com

Oxford Analytica is an international consulting firm providing strategic analysis of world events. It was founded in 1975 by David Young, an American employee of the National Security Council during the Nixon administration.

Clients of Oxford Analytica consist of governments, international institutions, and public sector bodies, as well as financial institutions, corporations, and other private sector organizations.

The company has access to a network of over 1,400 academics and specialists around the world. Its main activities are in the areas of geopolitics and macroeconomics, and its principal work comprises advisory work and a daily analysis service known as The Oxford Analytica Daily Brief.

== Notable former staff ==
- Michael Bates – Conservative ex-Minister who at one time ran Oxford Analytica's Consultancy & Research department.
- Giulio Regeni – an Italian graduate student kidnapped, tortured and killed in Egypt in 2016 who briefly worked at Oxford Analytica as a research assistant in 2014.
- Ronald A. Marks – former CIA/Capitol Hill official and IT entrepreneur who ran Oxford Analytica's Washington, D.C. office from 2005 to 2010.
- Nader Mousavizadeh – advisor to Secretary-General of the United Nations Kofi Annan.
