= Success trap =

The success trap refers to business organizations that focus on the exploitation of their (historically successful) current business activities and as such neglect the need to explore new territory and enhance their long-term viability.

== Overview ==
The success trap arises when a firm overemphasizes exploitation investments, even if explorative investments are required for successful adaptation. Exploitation draws on processes that serve to incrementally improve existing knowledge, while exploration involves the pursuit and acquisition of new knowledge. Firms and other organizations that have been performing well over an extended period of time are exposed to strong path dependence in exploitative activities, at the cost of explorative activities with which they have little experience. For example, in the 1990s Polaroid’s management failed to respond to the transition from analogue to digital photography, although the rise of digital technology had been evident since the 1980s. Other well-known examples of companies that got caught in the success trap include Nokia, Kodak, Rubbermaid and Caterpillar.

== Conditions giving rise to success trap ==
A key condition giving rise to a firm getting caught in the success trap is the company culture, having been created based on the understanding of what makes success, the culture then solidifies. When the environment changes there is an initial dismissing of the significance of the change and the (over time) subsequent failure to adjust the strategy of the firm. Thus, top managers do not ‘see’ the upcoming exogenous change, because their thinking and policies tend to constrain exploration and experimentation within the firm and inhibit the ability to bring about strategic change. A broader perspective arises from how exploration activities are suppressed in publicly owned companies as a result of the interplay between the CEO and other top executives, the Board of Directors, the pressure for short-term (improvements in) results arising from the capital market, and the substantial delay between the investment in exploration efforts and the return on these efforts.

== Preventing the success trap ==
The success trap can be best avoided early on, for example, by closely monitoring how other (e.g. leading) firms maintain a balance between exploitation and exploration activities, as well as by continually collecting information about changing customer needs, newly emerging technologies and other changes in the market and competitive environment. Drawing on this type of information, the executive board and board of directors together need to develop and sustain a shared long-term vision and strategy regarding the investments in exploitation and exploration activities. Once a publicly owned corporation has been suppressing exploration over an extended period of time, it tends to be almost impossible to get out of the success trap without major interventions - such as a hostile takeover by another corporation or an exit from the stock exchange.

== Consequences of the success trap ==
Firms that fall into the success trap suffer long term consequences. They grow their revenues at a lower pace than other companies and also create less shareholder value than more exploratory companies. These patterns can be observed for S&P 500 companies in the USA in the aggregate and also within industries.

== See also ==
- Ambidextrous organization
- Disruptive innovation
- Knowledge management
- Organizational learning
- Polaroid Corporation
- Strategic management
