= E. Wight Bakke =

American sociologist

Edward Wight Bakke
- Bakke in early 1950s
- Occupations: Economist and Sociologist

Academic background
- Education: Professor
- Alma mater: Northwestern University & Yale University

Academic work
- Discipline: Economics and Sociology
- Institutions: Yale University

Edward Wight Bakke (November 13, 1903 – November 23, 1971) was an American sociology and economics professor at Yale University who achieved prominence in the field of industrial relations. He was a Sterling Professor, Yale's highest level of academic rank, and served as director of the Yale Labor and Management Center from its founding in 1945 until its dissolution in the late 1950s. The author, co-author, or co-editor of thirteen books, Bakke made major contributions to the study of unemployment and organizational theory.

== Early life and education ==
Bakke was born and raised in Onawa, Iowa. He was of half Norwegian and half English descent; his father worked as a shoe merchant. He went to Onawa High School where he was president of his senior class among other activities.

He attended Northwestern University as an undergraduate, where he won a $2,000 national prize in oration. He graduated with a B.A. degree in philosophy in 1926. He was married to the former Mary Sterling in 1926, and they would have two sons and a daughter.

He went on to graduate studies at Yale University, first attending Yale Divinity School during 1926–29 where, although himself a Quaker, he served as an Episcopal pastor. Under the advice of sociologist Albert Galloway Keller he switched from philosophy to social science. In 1931 he studied unemployment in the United Kingdom during the early phase of the Great Depression, living on the dole in a working-class area of Greenwich, London. He received his Ph.D. from Yale in 1932.

== Early career ==
Bakke joined the faculty of Yale in 1932 where he became a fellow at the Jonathan Edwards College and taught sociology from 1932 to 1934. He then shifted fields and became an assistant professor of economics in 1934. He subsequently became professor of economics in 1938 then received the Sterling Professor designation in 1940. Within the interdisciplinary Yale Institute of Human Relations he was Director of Unemployment Studies during 1934–39. He was also the main social economist who consulted to the Social Security Board from 1936 to 1939.

His first book, The Unemployed Man (1934), was based on his experiences in England and received praise for his research methods and for the work's depiction of the human effects of unemployment, such as in his quote from one subject: "With a job there is a future, without a job there is a slow death of all that makes a man ambitious, industrious and glad to live." The effects highlighted also included the loss of self-esteem to men as their wives and daughters found work but they, as traditional heads of households, did not.

He then conducted an eight-year study of the effects of unemployment in local New Haven, Connecticut, and published two works – The Unemployed Worker and Citizens Without Work – in 1940 from that study. Bakke focused not just on the economic characteristics of unemployment but also on the social and psychological consequences and costs from it. As such, Bakke became known for the sensitivity which he brought to this subject. He emphasized the distaste the unemployed often had in applying for government relief, as illustrated by quotes like "I'd rather be dead and buried" and, when another was ultimately compelled to do so, "I would hide my face in the ground and pound the earth." The 2004 Encyclopedia of the Great Depression states that Bakke's New Haven study stands "as a powerful statement of the importance of stable, adequately-paying work opportunities for individual well-being, as well as broader social well-being" and that even given his other contributions to sociology, economics, and industrial relations, "Bakke's study of Depression-era unemployment remains his most influential and far-reaching work." Alice O'Connor, a professor of history at the University of California, Santa Barbara, wrote in 2010 that, "Seventy years later, the study's analysis still resonates".

== Later career ==
During World War II, Bakke was co-chair of the National War Labor Board's appeals committee. At times during his career he also served as a consultant to the U.S. Department of State and the U.S. Department of Labor regarding foreign programs for management retraining. In 1948 during the Truman administration he was appointed to the presidential Bituminous Coal Emergency Board, invoked under the Taft-Hartley Labor Act, which within a week reported that the threat of a coal strike harmful to the public interest had been avoided. In terms of politics, Bakke characterized himself as an independent.

As founding director of the Yale Labor and Management Center, Bakke's aim was to establish a scientific approach towards establishing and testing hypotheses about human actions in industrial relations and thereby establish an explanatory theory of behavior that could eventually help find ways to reduce the amount of labor-management conflict. Staging clinical working sessions between labor and management, he was able to bring representatives of both onto campus as one case of his abilities at influencing people. He was publicly passionate about the importance of the work, saying in 1946 that the survival of American democracy itself was at stake and that labor and management must work for "mutual survival, not separate survival." Bakke's earlier work as a sociologist before being an economist constituted a varied background that led him to construct an interdisciplinary approach that was beneficial for the field of industrial relations.

Much of Bakke's later career was taken up with the study of organizational theory, looking to find a theoretical approach to analysis that would explain not only behavior in businesses but also the same in other entities such as churches or schools. In books such as Bonds of Organization: An Appraisal of Corporate Human Relations (1950) he defined all activities of an organization as to falling into one of five categories: perpetuation, workflow, control, identification, and homeostasis. He devised a fusion process theory as a way of expressing how organizations, and individuals within them, accommodate divergent interests. As such, Bakke was regarding among a group of other eminent organizational theorists active in the 1950s, including Chris Argyris, James G. March, Rensis Likert, Jacob Marschak, Anatol Rapoport, and William Foote Whyte.

In 1958 Bakke published a report for the center entitled "The Human Resources Function". This is credited by Georgia State University professor and industrial relations scholar Bruce E. Kaufman as being the first use of the term "human resources" in its modern form, although Bakke used in a more pervasive sense to refer to all working relationships within an organization and not just those handled by a personnel department.

In addition to his role at Yale, in 1929 Bakke was one of the co-founders of the nearby Connecticut College of Commerce, subsequently holding a life position on its board of trustees and serving as chair of the board. In 1946, when it was known as the Junior College of Commerce, also served as vice president in the college's administration. He remained chair of the board in later years, by which time it was known as Quinnipiac College.

In 1953 he received a Fulbright professorship to teach at Copenhagen Business School, where he also set up a pilot study in human relations research in a Danish factory. He served as president of the Industrial Relations Research Association for 1958. In 1964 he received an honorary doctor of laws degree from his alma mater of Northwestern University.

His last book, about student activism in the 1960s, was written in collaboration with his wife Mary, who was an accomplished academic herself and had taught and served as a dean at Quinnipiac College. He died at his home in Woodbridge, Connecticut, on November 23, 1971, at age sixty-eight. Mary Bakke lived until 1987.

== Published works ==
- The Unemployed Man: A Social Study (E. P. Dutton & Co., 1934)
- After the Shut Down (Yale Institute of Human Relations, 1934) [co-author with Ewan Clague and Walter J. Couper]
- Insurance or Dole? The Adjustment of Unemployment Insurance to Economic and Social Facts in Great Britain (Yale University Press, 1935)
- The Unemployed Worker: A Study of the Task of Making a Living Without a Job (Yale University Press, 1940)
- Citizens Without Work (Yale University Press, 1940)
- Mutual Survival: The Goal of Unions and Management (Harper and Bros., 1946)
- Unions, Management, and the Public (Harcourt, Brace, 1948) [co-editor with Clark Kerr]
- Workers Wanted (Yale Labor and Management Center, 1949) [co-author with E. William Noland]
- Bonds of Organization: An Appraisal of Corporate Human Relations (Harper, 1950)
- Labor Mobility and Economic Opportunity (John Wiley & Sons, 1954) [co-author with five others]
- A Positive Labor Market Policy: Policy Premises for the Development, Operation, and Integration of the Employment and Manpower Services (Charles E. Merrill Books, 1963)
- Revolutionary Democracy: Challenge and Testing in Japan (Archon Books, 1968)
- Campus Challenge: Student Activism in Perspective (Archon Books, 1971) [co-author with Mary S. Bakke]
