= Ronald A. Marks =

CIA officer

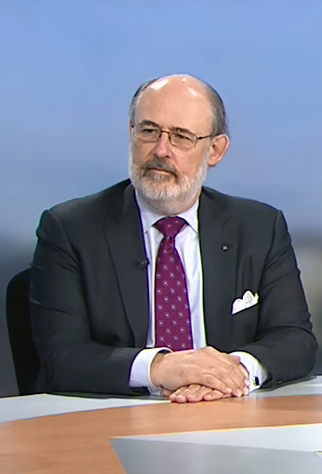

Ronald Anthony Marks is an American writer who is a former senior Central Intelligence Agency official and Capitol Hill Staffer. He is currently chairman and CEO of ZPN Cyber and National Security Strategies and an academic focused on Cyber and Intelligence policy issues. His book "Spying in America in the Post 9/11 World: Domestic Threat and the Need for Change," published by Praeger Publishing, focuses on the vast expansion of intelligence collection in America and the need for careful oversight.

== Personal ==
Marks was born in Portland, Oregon in April 1956 and raised in nearby Gresham. He graduated from Gresham High School in 1974. Marks received his B.Sci. in Business Administration and Economics with honors from Lewis & Clark College in 1978. Marks went on to the study at the Northwestern School of Law, Lewis and Clark College (1978–79) and took his M.Sci. in Economics at the University of Oregon in 1982. He is married and lives in McLean, Virginia.

== Career ==
Starting in October 1983, Marks spent 16 years with the CIA. During that time he occupied a number of increasingly senior positions including serving as Senate Liaison for 5 Directors of Central Intelligence. Marks went on to serve two years (1995–96) as Intelligence Counsel to U.S. Senate Majority Leaders Bob Dole and U.S. Senator Trent Lott.

From 2005 to 2010, Marks served as Senior Vice President and Director of Washington, D.C. operations for Oxford Analytica, a leading international risk analysis firm focused on geopolitics and economics, based in Oxford, U.K.

In 2011, Marks was appointed and served for three years as Director of Battelle Memorial Institute's Cyber Doctrine Program. He led a series of seminars and produced papers focused on deriving a United States Government Cyber Doctrine that applied to its both domestically and internationally recognizing there is no true separation between the two in the 21st century.

=== Academic career and think tank affiliations ===
Marks serves as a Term Visiting Professor at George Mason University's Schar School of Policy and Government, and as a Lecturer on Intelligence issues at Johns Hopkins University M.A. program in Global Security Studies, Krieger School of Arts and Sciences. He is a Lecturer with Road Scholar lecturing on the intelligence community structure and its interactions with Capitol Hill.

In June 2021, Marks was appointed a Non-resident Senior Fellow at the Atlantic Council's Scowcroft Center for Strategy and Security with expertise in cybersecurity, Defense policy and technologies, Intelligence, and National Security.

Marks served as the Spring 2020 Dole Fellow at the University of Kansas Robert J. Dole Institute of Politics. There he conducted seminars with cyber, news, and intelligence experts examining the challenges of "Spying in the 21st Century."

From 2016 to 2019, Marks worked with the Diana Davis Spencer Foundation to establish the Intelligence and Cyber M.A. Program at the Daniel Morgan Graduate School of National Security, now Texas A&M, Bush School DC where he was Department Chair. For six years (2005-2011), Marks served as an adjunct professor for Intelligence and National Security at the National Defense University's College of International Security Affairs where he lectured on intelligence, homeland security and cyberspace.

Since 1999, Marks has also been a Senior Steering Committee member of the Center for Strategic and International Studies Transnational Threats Project. Marks is currently an Associate Member of the International Institute for Strategics Studies (IISS), an international think tank based in London, U.K, The Royal Institute of International Affairs (Chatham House), and a member of the Washington, D.C. based Atlantic Council.

Marks was a member of the Council of Executives at The Auburn University's McCreary Institute's Center for Cyber and Homeland Security. He served as a Senior Fellow and Board Member from 2003 to 2018 at the then George Washington University based Center.

== Authored books and publications ==
In January 2011, Marks released his book focusing on the challenges and legalities of U.S. clandestine domestic Intelligence collection. Entitled "Spying in America in the Post 9/11 World: Domestic Threat and the Need for Change." Marks expressed his concerns Americans were unaware of rapidly expanding intelligence gathering within the U.S. He also noted a glaring lack of public oversight of the government agencies involved.

In December 2012, Marks served as primary reviewer and a contributor to the Battelle Memorial Institute book, "#Cyber Doctrine No Borders-No Boundaries," published by The Potomac Institute for Policy.

Marks has written on evolving national security and intelligence issues for the academic journals: Washington Quarterly, "The Uses and Limits of U.S. Intelligence" (Winter 2002); The Cambridge Review of International Affairs, "Defining America's Brave New World" (July 2002); and The International Journal of Intelligence and CounterIntelligence, "Intelligence Analysis—Is It As Good As It Gets (August 2015). And in 2008, he testified as an expert witness before the Senate Government Affairs and Homeland Security Committee on needed reform of the Intelligence Community structure and purpose.

In addition to op-ed contributions to newspapers and on-line blogs such as The Hill, War on the Rocks and Cipher Brief, Marks has been a featured commentator on intelligence and cyber related issues on CNN, Fox News Channel, MSNBC, E.W. Scripps Newsy, C-SPAN's Washington Journal, and various other media outlets.

== Organizational affiliations ==
Marks is a member of the Cosmos Club where he served on its Board of Management and as chair of its International Affairs Committee from 2010 to 2016. He is also on several other corporate and non-profit boards and advisory groups including: Informatica Federal Operations, a software firm based out of Redwood City, CA, and The Global TechnoPolitics Forum, a non-profit educational institution devoted to the under of advancing technology and its effect on global political leadership.
