= Ambidextrous organization =

Organizational adaptability

Organizational ambidexterity refers to an organization's ability to be efficient in its management of today's business and also adaptable for coping with tomorrow's changing demand. Just as being ambidextrous means being able to use both the left and right hand equally, organizational ambidexterity requires the organizations to use both exploration and exploitation techniques to be successful.

== Origin and development ==
Organizational ambidexterity was defined as an organization's ability to be aligned and efficient in its management of today's business demands as well as being adaptive to changes in the environment at the same time. This term of organizational ambidexterity was first used by Duncan, however, it was March that had been credited for developing and generating greater interest in this concept, especially in the late 20th and early 21st century. Ambidexterity in an organization is achieved by balancing exploration and exploitation, which allows the organization to be creative and adaptable, while also continuing to rely on more traditional, proven methods of business. Exploration includes things such as search, variation, risk taking, experimentation, flexibility, discovery or innovation, whereas exploitation includes such things as refinement, choice, production, efficiency, selection, implementation, and execution. Companies that focus only on exploration face the risk of wasting resources on ideas that may not prove useful or never be developed. On the other hand, companies that focus only on exploitation may accept status quo performance and products and fail to reach optimal levels of success.

Organizational ambidexterity is defined broadly, and several other terms are also highly related or similar to the construct of ambidextrous organization, including organizational learning, technological innovation, organizational adaptation, strategic management, and organizational design. Things such as reconciling exploitation and exploration, the simultaneity of induced and autonomous strategy processes, synchronizing incremental and discontinuous innovation, and balancing search and stability also tend to refer to the same underlying construct as ambidextrous organization.

There are studies on how structural and behavioral mechanisms affect organizational ambidexterity and studies on how ambidextrous organizational designs affect organizational ambidexterity. Whereas earlier studies on structural and behavioral mechanisms regarded the trade-offs between exploration and exploitation to be insurmountable, more recent research has paid attention to a range of organizational solutions to engender the existence of ambidexterity. One recent hot research topic in this area focused on the leadership characteristics that enable organizations to manage the contradictions that they face and achieve ambidexterity, which is the origin of the concept ‘ambidextrous leadership’. Several antecedents, outcomes of organizational ambidexterity as well as related moderators have also been identified in the studies on structural and behavioral mechanisms.

== Ambidextrous organizational designs and organizational ambidexterity ==
The studies on "ambidextrous organizations" take the organization as the unit of analysis and ambidextrous organizing is conceptualized as the simultaneous pursuit and combination of incremental and discontinuous innovation. "Ambidextrous organizations" are needed if the failure to balance exploitation and exploration is to be overcome: "the ability to pursue simultaneously both incremental and discontinuous innovation results from hosting multiple contradictory structures, processes, and cultures".

It has been empirically found that competence exploitation is negatively related to radical innovation performance whereas the effect for competence exploration is positive; competence exploration will be more valuable to the firm when it is matched with lower levels of competence exploitation, and vice versa. It has been theorized that the "ambidextrous organization" does not solve the tension between alignment and adaptability but allows for coping with the tension between different types of alignment in order to produce incremental and discontinuous innovation. "Ambidextrous organizations" do not alternate between exploration and exploitation, but they do both simultaneously.

There's work that empirically investigates the processes of ambidextrous organizing by analyzing the implementation of the "ambidextrous organizations" concept in order to study whether there is evidence on how companies applying the concepts (suggested by "ambidextrous organizations" proponents) actually manage the processes of exploitation and exploration.

== Structural and behavioral mechanisms that lead to organizational ambidexterity ==
Organizational ambidexterity can be considered primarily from two angles. One is architectural or structural ambidexterity, which uses dual organizational structures and strategies to differentiate efforts towards exploitation and exploration. Structural ambidexterity includes dual parts, with one part focusing on exploitation and the other focusing on exploration. It's also known as the spatial separation of the dual strategies concepts outlined above. The other approach is contextual ambidexterity, which uses behavioral and social means to integrate exploitation and exploration at the organizational unit level. Contextual ambidexterity is a balanced type that takes a mid-level position between exploitation and exploration, also known as parallel structures or hybrid strategies.

Although both angles are related to the theme of organizational ambidexterity, they strongly differ in the way how they are configured. There has always been a debate of which of the two different approaches is right. The dual type allows both discrete orientations and fit across dimensions at the unit level but creates a misfit between organizational units. Some researchers argued that inconsistent structures may lead to low performance. There are also some researchers trying to investigate the external and internal contingencies under which different configurations can be found. One factor would be the speed and type of technological change that organizations confront. On the other hand, the balanced type (i.e. contextual ambidexterity) is consistent with the systems approach of fit across multiple dimensions, but contradicts the opinion that organizational choice is discrete. In an environment where changes are slow, there will be sufficient time to react to the radical changes by constructing dual structures and strategies. However, in a high-competitive environment, balanced structures may be better prepared to deal with the constant need for alignment. In future studies, the different organizational ambidexterity configurations can be compared to find a better solution for dealing with the exploitation and exploration paradox.

== Antecedents of organizational ambidexterity ==
Ambidexterity is often considered a capacity or skill and can therefore be facilitated by managers such as CEOs and top executives. From the structural ambidexterity's view, organizations can solve the paradox by temporarily cycling through periods of exploitation and periods of exploration. From the other point of view (contextual ambidexterity), firms ought to address exploitation and exploration simultaneously and internally to achieve the goal ambidexterity. Contextual ambidexterity is more difficult to achieve than structural ambidexterity because managing two inconsistent alignments within an organization simultaneously is far more complex than managing one consistent strategy after another. Thus most studies on how to build ambidextrous organizations in literature focused on contextual ambidexterity rather than structural ambidexterity.

The role of leaders (or managers) is always highlighted towards building an ambidextrous organization. Several recommendations have been made to organizations on how to achieve contextual ambidexterity, including using of meta-routines and job-enrichment schemes, building trust with supervisees, being supportive, using complex behavioral repertoires, the creation of a shared vision., and having more gender balanced executive teams.

In addition, several characteristics of organizational culture are also emphasized on building an ambidextrous organization. Successful organizations should be able to balance the hard elements (discipline and stretch) and the soft elements (support and trust) in their organizational contexts. It was also suggested that establishing shared goals, developing a collective identity, creating a culture of support, and giving personal meaning to individuals’ contributions to the overall purpose of an organization all contributes to ambidexterity. A decentralized structure and a culture of excellence, recruitment and training are also important aspects of establishing an ambidextrous organization. In the context of family firms, the succession process, in which the firm is transferred from one generation of family members to the next, can be an appropriate time to balance exploration and exploitation. Organizational ambidexterity is likely to emerge when predecessors provide entrepreneurial resources to successors that guide and nurture their entrepreneurship.

== Outcomes of organizational ambidexterity ==
Ambidexterity is beneficial to organizations in many aspects. As it is the ability to keep a balance between explorative and exploitative processes, the most core outcome of ambidexterity is innovation because innovation needs both explorative and exploitative aspects. Innovation is defined as "the sequence of activities by which a new element is introduced into a social unit, with the intention of benefiting the unit, some part of it, or the wider society". The new element need not be entirely novel or unfamiliar to members of the unit, but it must involve some discernible change or challenge to the status quo. Most theoretical models of innovation differentiate at least two processes: idea generation and idea implementation. The generation phase is closely linked to explorative activities while the implementation phase is highly linked to exploitative activities. An ambidextrous organization is able to pursue innovation (creating new products/services) while also maintaining itself through the continued use of proven techniques/products.

In addition, ambidexterity can promote some other positive organizational outcomes besides innovation. It has been proved in literature that the interaction between explorative and exploitative innovation strategies (in other words, ambidexterity) is positively related to sales growth rate, and imbalance between explorative and exploitative innovation strategies is negatively related to sales growth rate. Various organizations have been able to overcome organizational challenges and become more innovative because of ambidexterity. A study looking at 41 businesses found that ambidexterity was highly correlated with performance. Similarly, another study of 34 high-tech organizations showed that their ability to simultaneously execute exploration and exploitation was associated with higher performance (Chandrasekaran et al. 2012).

Companies such as Apple, General Radio, Nordstrom and British Airways have all had continued success throughout the years because of their capacity for ambidexterity. From 1981 to 1986, British Airways experienced increased profits and customer satisfaction. Its top executives credited the formation of a more ambidextrous culture and leadership with the company's improved performance.

== Related moderators between organizational ambidexterity and organizational outcomes ==
Moderators exist in the relationship between organizational ambidexterity and organizational outcomes. Environmental dynamism and competitiveness moderate the relationship between exploitation/ exploration and performance. Empirical studies also showed that pursuing exploratory innovation is more effective in dynamic environments, whereas pursuing exploitative innovation is more beneficial to a unit's financial performance in more competitive environments. Although they were not directly testing an ambidextrous orientation, results indicated a positive performance effect of simultaneously pursuing exploitative and exploratory innovation under high dynamic and competitive environments. The effects of exploitative, explorative and balanced corporate alignment activities on performance were compared under varying environmental conditions. The construct of "environmental munificence" was developed to reflect an organization's opportunities and dynamism. They found that, although exploration was positively related to performance under high environmental munificence, a balanced orientation failed to significantly affect performance in times of low environmental munificence.

Market orientation was also proved to moderate the relationship between exploitation/exploration and performance. Market orientation was defined as "the capability to generate, disseminate, and respond to intelligence pertaining to current and future customers". A longitudinal study by Kyriakopoulos and Moorman (2004) showed that market orientation positively moderates the impact of pursuing high levels of exploitative and exploratory marketing strategies on new product performance; however, firms that pursue an ambidextrous orientation without strong market orientation display a significant reduction in new product financial performance.

Another factor that may moderate ambidexterity's effect on performance is firm resources (Kyriakopoulos & Moorman, 2004). Firms with rich resources have the ability to exploit and explore simultaneously, whereas firms with less resources may not be able to afford such a complex strategy. Similarly, Lubatkin et al. stated that small firms "lack the amount of slack resources and the kind of hierarchical administration systems that can help or impede larger firms in managing their contradictory knowledge processes and, thus, affect the attainment of ambidexterity". This idea was supported by empirical evidence that small firms may benefit more from a one-sided orientation than from mixed strategies.

Boundary conditions were also addressed on choosing between structural and contextual ambidexterity. For example, spatial separation was suggested as an appropriate solution for environments characterized by long periods of stability, disrupted by rare events of discontinuous change. Research also found that firms operating in dynamic competitive environments rely on contextual ambidexterity rather than developing spatially separated units.

== Levels of ambidexterity ==
The functional definition of ambidexterity was originally used to describe organizations, but recently this concept was extended to multiple organizational levels, including individuals, teams, and leaders. On the most general level, the concept of ambidexterity implies successfully managing the dichotomy of explorative variability creation and exploitative variability reduction.

Whenever there are needs to be both explorative and exploitive, conflict occurs. That's when ambidexterity is necessary. Actually, regulating the conflicting demands of innovation is not only a challenge for the upper echelon of an organization but also a phenomenon that spans all levels of an organization. Employees as individuals, collectives of employees such as work teams, and the organization as a whole all have to find strategies to deal with conflicting demands in order to succeed in innovation and adaption to changing markets. Some examples of strategies and tactics that could be implemented at all three levels of analysis were also listed out. These examples are presented in Table 1, including a separation strategy (in the Separation column) or an integration strategy (in the last two columns).

== Ambidextrous leadership ==
Recently the focus on organizational ambidexterity has become more concentrated on how leaders act ambidextrously to achieve organizational ambidexterity. Senior managers may be the key for facilitating the context and social base for ambidexterity. Noting that ambidextrous organizations require significant amounts of mobilization, coordination, and integration activities to maintain both exploitation and exploration, informal and social integration of the senior team as well as the cross-functional interfaces of the formal organization contribute to the success of organizational ambidexterity significantly. A recent model of ambidexterity and leadership suggests that CEOs and top management teams (TMT) play an integral role in establishing ambidexterity in small-to-medium-sized organizations. The model suggests TMTs are where processes such as information sharing and knowledge processing, which influence ambidexterity, are likely to occur. Furthermore, it is the CEO who has the ability to access the most valuable and diverse information needed to avoid separation of explorative and exploitative behaviors. The greater the interface between TMTs and CEOs in small-to-medium-sized organizations, the greater the amount of ambidexterity.

The concept of ambidexterity was first formally introduced into the leadership area by the Rosing, Frese and Bausch (2011) paper, holding the idea that leaders should be able to lead their team to match the complexity and the pace of innovation. Ambidextrous leadership was defined as the leaders’ ability to foster both explorative and exploitative behaviors in followers by increasing or reducing variance in their behavior and flexibly switching between those behaviors.

The construct of ambidextrous leadership has also been linked to the combination of leadership styles. Leaders who are transformational encourage "out of the box thinking", information sharing and question assumptions. Transformational leaders promote exploration and innovative thinking. Transactional leaders focus on making incremental improvements and making the best use of existing processes. The transactional leadership style promotes exploitative behaviors. An ambidextrous leader is able to switch back and forth between transformation/exploration and transaction/exploitation as needed, in other words, being able to switch between different leadership styles at the appropriate time, in order to foster innovation and then implement plans.

Ambidextrous leadership consists of three elements (1) opening leader behaviors to foster exploration, (2) closing leader behaviors to foster exploitation, (3) and the temporal flexibility to switch between both as the situation requires. Opening leadership behaviors include: allowing for multiple ways to accomplish a task, experimentation and errors, whereas closing behaviors include; monitoring routines, sticking to plans and minimizing errors. The Rosing et al. (2011)'s model of leadership and innovation was shown in Figure 1.

== Controversy and future directions ==
Some scholars as well as practitioners have argued that established companies simply lack the flexibility to explore new territories. One contributing reason could be the so-called success trap (i.e. the focus on their, historically successful, current business activities). A possible solution for big companies is to adopt a venture capital model – funding exploratory expeditions but otherwise not interfering too much with their operations. Another suggestion is for the use of cross-functional teams to achieve breakthrough innovations. Still others have suggested that a company may be able to alternate between different organizational models, focusing on exploitation and exploration at different time periods.

For example, in a study of biotechnology firms it is shown how an organization's management control system can be adjusted periodically to achieve this changing focus on exploitation and exploration. Researchers also debate if ambidexterity can be attained because exploration and exploitation tend to emerge from contradictory information and knowledge inputs and because success due to exploration/exploitation tends to be self-reinforcing leading to the use of the same methods in the future. An empirical study of ambidexterity in organizations further cautions that very low levels of both exploration and exploitation are not sufficient to contribute to superior firm performance. High firm performance may however need to be sustained through continuous exploitation both on the market side, through business model innovation and technology innovation.

Ambidexterity can also be hampered by employee desire to receive organizational rewards. If organizations base their evaluation and reward systems on the completion of routine tasks, employees will be more likely to conform to standardized procedures. To avoid hindering ambidexterity, organizations should be sure to reward innovative thinking as well as completion of routine tasks.

Despite the controversy surrounding the possibility of organizational ambidexterity, it is likely to continue to be a highly researched concept in the future. Future research is likely to focus on the role of ambidextrous leaders, ambidextrous teams and the social context of organizational ambidexterity.

== See also ==
- Ambidexterity
- Communities of innovation
- Contingency Theory
- Labour exploitation
- Exploration
- Innovation
- Knowledge management
- Leadership
- Organizational culture
- Organization design
- Organizational learning
- Organizational structure
- Success trap
- Tacit knowledge
- Technological change
- Transactional leadership
- Transformational leadership
