= Air-defense experiments =

The Air-defense experiments were a series of management science experiments performed between 1952 and 1954 by RAND Corporation's Systems Research Laboratory. The experiments were designed to provide information about organizational learning and how teams improved their performance through practice.

== Experiment structure ==
The series was constructed from four different experiments (code named Casey, Cowboy, Cobra, and Cogwheel). The first of these (Casey) used college students as crew for the air defense scenario whilst members of the United States Air Force were used in the latter experiments. For each of the four experiments different structures and timespans were used:

- Casey: 28 college students, 54 4-hour sessions
- Cowboy: 39 Air Force officers and airmen, 22 8-hour sessions
- Cobra: 40 Air Force officers and airmen, 22 8-hour sessions
- Cogwheel: 33 Air Force officers and airmen, 14 4-hour sessions

== Purpose ==
The purpose of the experiments was to examine how teams of men operated in an environment composed of complex information flows making decisions under conditions of high stress. The experimental design was to simulate an air defense control center in which the team was presented with simulated radar images showing air traffic as well as simulated telephone conversations with outside agencies reporting additional information (such as the availability of interceptor aircraft or confirmation of civilian aircraft).

== Results and conclusions ==
The experiment series generated a great deal of both qualitative and quantitative data and the results of earlier experiments were used to improve the experimental apparatus and organization for later versions of the experiment.

The first experiment (Casey) was conducted with college students from which it was determined that culture was a large factor in team as well as individual performance. While an attempt had been made to approximate a military culture in the college student team, the researchers decided that use of actual military personnel would provide more success. Hence later experiments used exclusively servicemen.

The original experimental design was to provide a particular level of difficulty to determine how well the air-defense team was able learn the individual tasks as well as the intra-team coordination needed to be successful at the air-defense task. The research team also modified the experimental design after the results of Casey, these indicated that crews were able to learn rapidly and were able to accommodate the level of difficulty, within a few sessions, to an effective level.

Beginning with Cowboy, the air-defense crews were presented with a series of sessions each of which had a higher task load than the previous session. The task load was made up of two variables, kind and number of hostile aircraft and characteristics of friendly traffic (among which the hostile aircraft were sprinkled).

In the report on these experiments co-authors Chapman, Kennedy, Newell, and Biel (1959) write that:

the four [experimental] organizations behaved like organisms. Not only did the experiments provide graphic demonstrations of how much performance difference resulted from learning, but they also showed how differently the same people used the same tools under essentially the same load conditions at different times. The structures and procedures that glued functional components together so changed that an organization was only nominally the same from day to day.

== See also ==
- Business performance management
- Forming-Storming-Norming-Performing team formation model
- Key performance indicators
- Performance improvement
- Qualitative research
- Qualitative psychological research
- Quality management
- Quantitative research
- Workplace democracy
