= Interventionism =

Interventionism may refer to:

- Interventionism (politics), activity undertaken by a state to influence something not directly under its control
- Economic interventionism, an economic policy position favouring government intervention in the market
- Interventionism (medicine) is also a medical term in which patients are viewed as passive recipients receiving external treatments that have the effect of prolonging life
- Interventionism (theology)

== See also ==
- Intervention (disambiguation)
