= Yale Labor and Management Center =

US research center

Cover of a publication

The Yale Labor and Management Center was a research center that was part of Yale University in New Haven, Connecticut. It was founded in late 1944 or 1945 and existed until 1958 or 1959. (Note: The exact start and end dates for the center are difficult to determine. Most sources give the start date as 1945 but one says December 1944 while another gives 1945 and then later 1944. Sources say the center was gone by the late 1950s; it clearly was being phased out by 1957 but a 1958 report by Bakke directly attributes itself to the center while a review of a 1959 Bakke work says it is available from the center.) Its stated mission was to engage in "the study of the basic principles of human relationships involved in industrial relations and analysis of the forces operating in the labor market." It was led by its only director, E. Wight Bakke, a noted Yale professor of economics and specialist in industrial relations.

== Background and creation ==
The period from the early 1930s to the end of World War II saw a rapid increase in membership of labor unions in America, and with that came frequent and sometimes violent labor-management conflict, only temporarily suppressed by the arbitration powers of the National War Labor Board. The center was part of a wave new academic institutes and degree programs that sought to analyze the role of and collective bargaining, which had assumed a much greater (and sometimes violent) role in American life since the 1930s. The most known of these was the Cornell University School of Industrial and Labor Relations, but counting various forms there were over seventy-five others. The new Yale center was one of the few newly formed entities that chose not to include some form of "industrial relations" in its name.

The new center was created as part of the Yale Institute of Human Relations and was housed with it in a wing of the Sterling Hall of Medicine on Cedar Street in New Haven. It was initially funded by a fellowship which allowed Bakke to get five each labor and management representatives to come to the campus for joint studies. A policy committee made up of three each Yale, labor, and management representatives was set up to oversee the research projects the center would undertake and ensure neutrality of approach.

== Operation and activities ==
Bakke's aim with the center was to establish a scientific approach towards establishing and testing hypotheses about human actions in industrial relations and thus establish an explanatory theory of behavior, with the eventual goal of finding ways to reduce the amount of labor-management conflict. He said, "I am convinced that the lack of theory of human behavior is our most serious handicap in the development of policy in labor relations. Management, union leaders and workers all must have a working knowledge, validated by experience, of such questions as: (1) why does the other person behave as he does? (2) why does he change from one kind of behavior to another? (3) how will this proposal or this action affect him – and why?"

The research program established to work on these problems drew considerable attention within the field. Bakke stressed that the center not take ivory tower approaches and instead it held clinical working sessions between labor and management representatives on campus and established research "listening posts" in places such as Detroit and Charlotte. It also featured special classes, attended by representatives of labor and management, in economics and labor relations. Bakke was publicly vocal about the importance of the work, saying in 1946 after a series of initial interim reports was released that the survival of American democracy itself was at stake and that labor and management must work for "mutual survival, not separate survival."

Letterhead

In a 1949 journal article recap of the center's first several years in operation, Bakke said that their decision to emphasize basic research in finding a systematic explanation of behavior in labor-management relations had been affirmed by their experiences.

A noted Yale professor of economics and industrial relations scholar, Neil W. Chamberlain, became the center's research director in 1946 and its assistant director in 1949 before leaving the university in 1954. Chris Argyris, who became a well-known theorist in organizational behavior, had a position in the center in the early 1950s and both it and Bakke were influential on his early thinking. Bakke himself had been a sociologist before becoming an economist and this varied background led him to construct an interdisciplinary approach that was beneficial for the field of industrial relations.

By 1952, the center's work was divided into three areas of interest, each with its own research director: analyzing human relations in an organizational context, using extensive interview data from the Southern New England Telephone Company, led by Bakke and Argyris, with a number of assistants; forming a treatise on wage theory, led by Professor Lloyd G. Reynolds with Robert M. MacDonald assisting, based on data found both locally and in Europe; and an exploration of social responsibility in labor-management relations together with a study on the composition of bargaining units, led by Chamberlain and with assistance from Jane Metzger Schilling. A number of books were published as being part of the "Yale Labor and Management Center Series", with most of them being authored by Bakke, Chamberlain, or Reynolds. Besides books, the center also published interim reports, reflecting research in progress, and reprints of articles of interest published by members of the center's staff.

== End ==
During the 1955–57 period many of the research projects previously undertaken as part of the center were merged into a new program of research and graduate work as part of the university's Department of Industrial Relations. Bakke himself helped set up this department and the center wound down during the late 1950s.

According to Georgia State University professor Bruce E. Kaufman, the Yale Labor and Management Center was an "important institutional development" than became "an exemplar in industrial relations" during the period he terms the "Golden Age of Industrial Relations".
