= Societal innovation =

Societal innovation refers to a systemic change in the interplay of the state and civil society. It is a relative of social innovation, but differs from it by considering the state to be an important co-creator in achieving sustainable systemic change. In this sense, the term's origins lie beyond the traditional Anglo-Saxon understanding of the concept of social innovation.

The term has been used in research, see e.g. , but also in some official reports and documents of the European Union, where societal innovation is considered as an answer to societal challenges. A formal definition exists

A societal innovation introduces a novel economic and/or social improvement to people’s everyday life. It brings a (radical or incremental) systemic change to society’s structures or modes of operation, and it is legitimated by the majority of societal stakeholders.

== See also ==
Aalto Camp for Societal Innovation

Societal Innovation Blog
