= Learning agenda =

Set of questions about what needs to be learned before planning

A learning agenda is a set of questions, assembled by an organization or team, that identifies what needs to be learned before a project can be planned and implemented.

== Overview ==
An organizational learning agenda is frequently a set of broad questions directly related to the work enable the organization to work more effectively and efficiently. It often uses evaluation and evidence and links these to decision-making. Increasingly, the term learning agenda has been used by federal government agencies, non-profit organizational and international organizations. Learning agendas often have three major parts: a set of learning questions, a series of activities to answer them and a plan to share and disseminate the information.

Learning agendas are used as an organizational learning tool to improve organizational effectiveness and efficiency within the government. For example, learning agendas have been referenced by the US Office of Management and Budget for use within the US federal government. The process often varies but often includes a set of common steps. These include convening relevant stakeholders and reviewing the literature for what is already known about the topic. Following this learning questions are frequently identified and prioritized. Following this, a plan is developed for answering those questions and implementing learning activities such as studies and analyses. Often key stakeholders are involved at different stages depending on the learning agenda. The evidence is disseminated usually through learning products such as reports or infographics in order to allow staff to use and apply the findings in their work.

== History ==
The first documented use of learning agenda appears to be from the early 1960s. Its origins are in the educational and business fields. Often the term learning agenda was employed to describe an individual's path to learning, whether in a classroom or as a manager in a company. Following more recent work on organizational learning within government and the business sector, the concept of a learning agenda has become linked to idea of "learning organization", a term popularized by Peter Senge's work. However, the use of learning agenda within the business field to describe an individual's pathway of learning is still common. In its place, other terms are used, such as "CEO agenda", in which learning occurs around the implementation of strategic goals and performance metrics.

== Examples ==
Within the US federal government, learning agendas have been used by a number of federal government agencies. For example, within the U.S. Agency for International Development, learning agendas have been developed across multiple offices and bureaus including across the agency and bureaus that work on democracy and governance, health, food security, biodiversity and wildlife trafficking, as well as cross-Agency initiatives. In addition, central bureaus such as the Bureau for Policy, Planning and Learning has a learning agenda focused on the Program Cycle

Other federal agencies that have developed learning agendas include the U.S. Department of Housing and Urban Development, the U.S. Department of Labor, within the Substance Abuse and Mental Health Services Administration, a branch of the U.S. Department of Health and Human Services, and the Corporation for National and Community Service (CNCS) and the U.S. Department of Agriculture's Foreign Agricultural Service (FAS). MEASURE Evaluation, which operates under a cooperative agreement with USAID to provide thought and technical leadership in monitoring and evaluation and data in health systems, has recently developed an independent learning agenda. Other bilateral donors within international development have yet to use the term learning agenda although many have utilized the use of evaluations for learning purposes.

One example of the use of the term "learning agenda" in the private sector is an Accenture learning agenda for its Skills to Succeed project. In addition, a wide range of international development organizations have developed learning agendas, including, but by no means limited to, the following: the United Nations Research Institute for Social Development's (UNRISD) five-year Research Strategy (2016), the Bill & Melinda Gates Foundation-funded Disconnected Youth learning agenda (MDRC, 2010), the RISE Learning Network's Learning Projects initiative (2015), and Youth Business International's (YBI) three-year Research and learning agenda (2014).

== See also ==
- Adaptation
- Adaptive management
- Agile management
- Collaborative learning
- Project
