= Learning organization =

Type of company

In business management, a learning organization is a company that facilitates the learning of its members and continuously transforms itself. The concept was coined through the work and research of Peter Senge and his colleagues.

Learning organizations may develop as a result of the pressures facing modern organizations; this enables them to remain competitive in the business environment.

== Characteristics ==
There are many definitions of a learning organization as well as typologies of kinds of learning organizations.

Peter Senge stated in an interview that a learning organization is a group of people working together collectively to enhance their capacities to create results they really care about. Senge popularized the concept of the learning organization through his book The Fifth Discipline. In the book, he proposed the following five characteristics:

=== Systems thinking ===
The idea of the learning organization developed from a body of work called systems thinking. This is a conceptual framework that allows people to study businesses as bounded objects. Learning organizations use this method of thinking when assessing their company and have information systems that measure the performance of the organization as a whole and of its various components. Systems thinking states that all the characteristics of a learning organization must be apparent at once in an organization for it to be a learning organization. If some of these characteristics are missing then the organization will fall short of its goal. However, O'Keeffe believes that the characteristics of a learning organization are factors that are gradually acquired, rather than developed simultaneously.

=== Personal mastery ===
The commitment by an individual to the process of learning is known as personal mastery. There is a competitive advantage for an organization whose workforce can learn more quickly than the workforce of other organizations. Learning is considered to be more than just acquiring information; it is expanding the ability to be more productive by learning how to apply our skills to work in the most valuable way. Personal mastery appears also in a spiritual way as, for example, clarification of focus, personal vision and ability to see and interpret reality objectively. Individual learning is acquired through staff training, development and continuous self-improvement; however, learning cannot be forced upon an individual who is not receptive to learning. Research shows that most learning in the workplace is incidental, rather than the product of formal training, therefore it is important to develop a culture where personal mastery is practiced in daily life. A learning organization has been described as the sum of individual learning, but there must be mechanisms for individual learning to be transferred into organizational learning. Personal mastery makes possible many positive outcomes such as individual performance, self-efficacy, self-motivation, sense of responsibility, commitment, patience and focus on relevant matters as well as work-life balance and well-being.

=== Mental models ===
Assumptions and generalizations held by individuals and organizations are called mental models. Personal mental models describe what people can or cannot detect. Due to selective observation, mental models might limit peoples’ observations. To become a learning organization, these models must be identified and challenged. Individuals tend to espouse theories, which are what they intend to follow, and theories-in-use, which are what they actually do. Similarly, organizations tend to have 'memories' which preserve certain behaviours, norms and values. In creating a learning environment it is important to replace confrontational attitudes with an open culture that promotes inquiry and trust. To achieve this, the learning organization needs mechanisms for locating and assessing organizational theories of action. Unwanted values need to be discarded in a process called 'unlearning'. Wang and Ahmed refer to this as 'triple loop learning'. For organizations, problems arise when mental models evolve beneath the level of awareness. Thus it is important to examine business issues and actively question current business practices and new skills before they become integrated into new practices.

=== Shared vision ===
The development of a shared vision is important in motivating the staff to learn, as it creates a common identity that provides focus and energy for learning. The most successful visions build on the individual visions of the employees at all levels of the organization, thus the creation of a shared vision can be hindered by traditional structures where the company vision is imposed from above. Therefore, learning organizations tend to have flat, decentralized organizational structures. The shared vision is often to succeed against a competitor; however, Senge states that these are transitory goals and suggests that there should also be long-term goals that are intrinsic within the company. On the other hand, the lack of clearly defined goals can negatively affect the organization, as it cannot attain its members trust. Applying the practices of a shared vision creates a suitable environment for the development of trust through communication and collaboration within the organization. As a result, the built shared vision encourages the members to share their own experiences and opinions, thus enhancing effects of organizational learning.

=== Team learning ===
The accumulation of individual learning constitutes team learning. The benefit of team or shared learning is that staff learn more quickly and the problem solving capacity of the organization is improved through better access to knowledge and expertise. Learning organizations have structures that facilitate team learning with features such as boundary crossing and openness. In team meetings members can learn better from each other by concentrating on listening, avoiding interruption, being interested and responding. In such a learning environment, people don't have to hide or overlook their disagreements, so they make their collective understanding richer. Three dimensions of team learning, according to Senge, are: "the ability to think insightfully about complex issues", "the ability to take innovative, coordinated action", and "the ability to create a network that will allow other teams to take action as well". In a learning organization, teams learn how to think together. Team learning is process of adapting and developing the team capacity to create the results that its members really want. Team learning requires individuals to engage in dialogue and discussion; therefore team members must develop open communication, shared meaning, and shared understanding. Learning organizations typically have excellent knowledge management structures, allowing creation, acquisition, dissemination, and implementation of this knowledge in the organization. Teams use tools such as an action learning cycle and dialogue. Team learning is only one element of the learning cycle. For the cycle to be complete, it has to include all five characteristics which are mentioned above.

== Development ==
Organizations do not organically develop into learning organizations; there are factors prompting their change. As organizations grow, they lose their capacity to learn as company structures and individual thinking becomes rigid. When problems arise, the proposed solutions often turn out to be only short-term (single-loop learning instead of double-loop learning) and re-emerge in the future. To remain competitive, many organizations have restructured, with fewer people in the company. This means those who remain need to work more effectively. To create a competitive advantage, companies need to learn faster than their competitors and to develop a customer responsive culture. Chris Argyris identified that organizations need to maintain knowledge about new products and processes, understand what is happening in the outside environment and produce creative solutions using the knowledge and skills of all within the organization. This requires co-operation between individuals and groups, free and reliable communication, and a culture of trust.

For any learning to take place, also in organizations, there needs to be diffusion of knowledge. Diffusion is not always easy to perform, since it depends on the recipient’s willingness to accept the new knowledge, their need of the new information and the relationship of their existing knowledge to the new information. The most useful knowledge is rarely something that is formed in one’s head and then diffused to others. Useful knowledge generally consists of different pieces of information which are then combined. For the gathering of information, organizations need some sort of a content repository for all the information. These repositories are nowadays usually built with the aid of information technology. With a repository of information and a knowledge infrastructure, that simplifies the creation of knowledge in a practical form, an organization will have all its knowledge available for everyone in the organization, which will further help the learning in the organization. For example, USAID has a number of technical website platforms focused on development topics including Learning Lab, AgriLinks, DRGLinks, Edulinks and ResilienceLinks.

== Benefits ==
One of the main benefits being a learning organization offers is a competitive advantage. This competitive advantage can be founded on different strategies, which can be acquired by organizational learning. One way of gaining a competitive advantage is strategic flexibility. The continuous inflow of new experience and knowledge keeps the organization dynamic and prepared for change. In an ever-changing institutional environment this can be a key factor for an advantage. Better management of an organizations explorative investments and exploitative acting can be a benefit of a learning organization, too. Next, a competitive advantage of a company can be gained by lower prices and better quality of products. Through organizational learning both cost leadership and differentiation strategies are possible. The ability to reconfigure actions based on needs and environment avoids the tradeoff between the two. Overall the customer performance of learning organizations might be better, which is the direct and measurable channel, that establishes a competitive advantage. Another important aspect is innovation. Innovation and learning are closely related. While encouraging people to learn and develop, a more innovative environment is commonly generated, innovative ideas coming from e.g. communities of practice can result in greater overall organizational learning.

Other benefits of a learning organization are:

- Maintaining levels of innovation and remaining competitive
- Having the knowledge to better link resources to customer needs
- Improving quality of outputs at all levels
- Improving corporate image by becoming more people oriented
- Increasing the pace of change within the organization
- Strengthening sense of community in the organization
- Improving long term decision making
- Improving knowledge sharing

== Barriers ==
Even within or without learning organization, problems can stall the process of learning or cause it to regress. Most of them arise from an organization not fully embracing all the necessary facets. Once these problems can be identified, work can begin on improving them.

Some organizations find it hard to embrace personal mastery because as a concept it is intangible and the benefits cannot be quantified; personal mastery can even be seen as a threat to the organization. This threat can be real, as Senge points out, that 'to empower people in an unaligned organization can be counterproductive'. In other words, if individuals do not engage with a shared vision, personal mastery could be used to advance their own personal visions. In some organizations a lack of a learning culture can be a barrier to learning. An environment must be created where individuals can share learning without it being devalued and ignored, so more people can benefit from their knowledge and the individuals becomes empowered. A learning organization needs to fully accept the removal of traditional hierarchical structures.

Resistance to learning can occur within a learning organization if there is not sufficient buy-in at an individual level. This is often encountered with people who feel threatened by change or believe that they have the most to lose. They are likely to have closed mind sets, and are not willing to engage with mental models. Unless implemented coherently across the organization, learning can be viewed as elitist and restricted to senior levels. In that case, learning will not be viewed as a shared vision. If training and development is compulsory, it can be viewed as a form of control, rather than as personal development. Learning and the pursuit of personal mastery needs to be an individual choice, therefore enforced take-up will not work.

In addition, organizational size may become the barrier to internal knowledge sharing. When the number of employees exceeds 150, internal knowledge sharing dramatically decreases because of higher complexity in the formal organizational structure, weaker inter-employee relationships, lower trust, reduced connective efficacy, and less effective communication. As such, as the size of an organizational unit increases, the effectiveness of internal knowledge flows dramatically diminishes and the degree of intra-organizational knowledge sharing decreases.

Problems with Senge's vision include a failure to fully appreciate and incorporate the imperatives that animate modern organizations; the relative sophistication of the thinking he requires of managers (and whether many in practice are up to it); and questions regarding his treatment of organizational politics. It is certainly difficult to find real-life examples of learning organizations (Kerka 1995). There has also been a lack of critical analysis of the theoretical framework.

Based on their study of attempts to reform the Swiss Postal Service, Matthias Finger and Silvia Bűrgin Brand (1999) provide a useful listing of more important shortcomings of the learning organization concept. They conclude that it is not possible to transform a bureaucratic organization by learning initiatives alone. They believe that by referring to the notion of the learning organization it was possible to make change less threatening and more acceptable to participants. 'However, individual and collective learning, which has undoubtedly taken place, has not really been connected to organizational change and transformation'. Part of the issue, they suggest, has to do with the concept of the learning organization itself. They argue that the concept of the learning organization:

1. Focuses mainly on the cultural dimension and does not adequately take into account the other dimensions of an organization. To transform an organization, it is necessary to attend to structures and the organization of work as well as the culture and processes. 'Focussing exclusively on training activities in order to foster learning... favours this purely cultural bias'.
2. Favours individual and collective learning processes at all levels of the organization, but does not connect them properly to the organization's strategic objectives. Popular models of organizational learning (such as Dixon 1994) assume such a link. It is, therefore, imperative 'that the link between individual and collective learning and the organization's strategic objectives is made'. This shortcoming, Finger and Brand argue, makes a case for some form of measurement of organizational learning – so that it is possible to assess the extent to which such learning contributes or not towards strategic objectives.

While there are different challenges in implementing learning organization in different fields, the concept has been proven successful in cases ranging from commercial firms, NGOs, schools, to field archaeological institutions.

=== Challenges in the transformation to a learning organization ===
The book The Dance of Change states there are many reasons why an organization may have trouble in transforming itself into a learning organization. The first is that an organization does not have enough time. Employees and management may have other issues that take priority over trying to change the culture of their organization. The team may not be able to commit the time if an institution does not have the appropriate help or training. For an organization to be able to change, it needs to know the steps necessary to solve the problems it faces. As a solution, a mentor or coach who is well versed in the learning organization concept may be necessary.

Also, the change may not be relevant to the organization's needs. Time should be spent on the actual issues of the organization and its daily issues. To combat this challenge, a strategy must be built. The organization should determine what its problems are before entering into the transformation. Training should remain linked to business results so that it is easier for employees to connect the training with everyday issues.

A usual challenge with many organizations is the lack of concentration on personal development while focusing mainly on professional development which is more likely to have a direct contribution to organization's performance whereas personal development's positive results appear more in the long run and less visibly.

As for the leader, it may be challenging not to consider one's own personal vision as the organization's shared vision.

=== Problems organizational learning addresses ===
Some of the issues that learning organizations were designed to address within institutions is fragmentation, competition and reactiveness. Fragmentation is described as breaking a problem into pieces. For example, each organization has an accounting department, finance, operations, IT and marketing. Competition occurs when employees are trying to do better or 'beat' others in an assignment instead of collaborating. Reactiveness occurs when an organization changes only in reaction to outside forces, rather than proactively initiating change.

Inappropriate habits while organizing team meetings can effect negatively. Meetings should be prepared in time, agenda drawn up and enough time dedicated to focus on the subjects. Because best results in team learning form through discipline, it is essential to have an agenda, make atmosphere open and respect others: avoid interruption, be interested and respond.

== See also ==
- Community of practice
- Knowledge capture
- Knowledge management
- Knowledge organization
- Lean startup
- Learning agenda
- Organizational learning
- Professional learning community
- Reflective practice
