= Double-loop learning =

Learning model

Double-loop learning entails the modification of goals or decision-making rules in the light of experience. In double-loop learning, individuals or organizations not only correct errors based on existing rules or assumptions (which is known as single-loop learning), but also question and modify the underlying assumptions, goals, and norms that led to those actions. The first loop uses the goals or decision-making rules, the second loop enables their modification, hence "double-loop". Double-loop learning recognizes that the way a problem is defined and solved can be a source of the problem. This type of learning can be useful in organizational learning since it can drive creativity and innovation, going beyond adapting to change to anticipating or being ahead of change.

== Concept ==
The concept of double-loop learning was introduced by Chris Argyris in the 1970s. Double-loop learning is contrasted with "single-loop learning": the repeated attempt at the same issue, with no variation of method and without ever questioning the goal. Chris Argyris described the distinction between single-loop and double-loop learning using the following analogy:

[A] thermostat that automatically turns on the heat whenever the temperature in a room drops below 69°F is a good example of single-loop learning. A thermostat that could ask, "why am I set to 69°F?" and then explore whether or not some other temperature might more economically achieve the goal of heating the room would be engaged in double-loop learning.

— Chris Argyris, Teaching Smart People How To Learn

Double-loop learning is used when it is necessary to change the mental model on which a decision depends. Unlike single loops, this model includes a shift in understanding, from simple and static to broader and more dynamic, such as taking into account the changes in the surroundings and the need for expression changes in mental models. It is required if the problem or mismatch that starts the organizational learning process cannot be addressed by small adjustments because it involves the organization's governing variables. Organizational learning in such cases occurs when the diagnosis and intervention produce changes in the underlying policies, assumptions, and goals. According to Argyris, many organizations resist double-loop learning due to a number of variables such as resistance to change, fear of failure, and overemphasis on control.

Reference models I and II

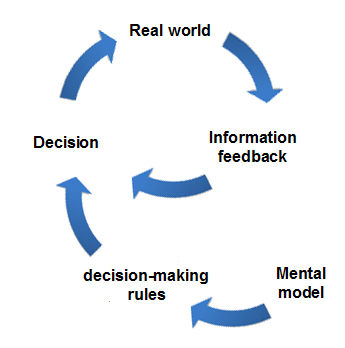
Single-loop learning

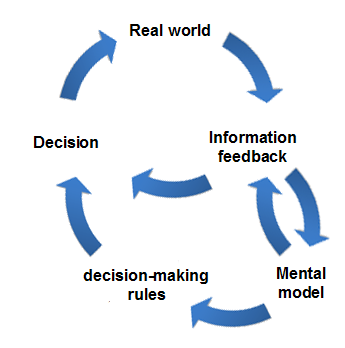
Double-loop learning

== Historical precursors ==
A Behavioral Theory of the Firm (1963) describes how organizations learn, using (what would now be described as) double-loop learning:

An organization ... changes its behavior in response to short-run feedback from the environment according to some fairly well-defined rules. It changes rules in response to longer-run feedback according to more general rules, and so on.

— Richard Cyert and James G. March, A Behavioural Theory of the Firm

In a 2019 article, Geoffrey Sloan said that the double-loop learning framework can be used to understand how the Western Approaches Tactical Unit (WATU) of the Royal Navy during WW2 solved a critical tactical problem by changing the organization's basic standards, policies, and goals. WATU was able to develop and update anti-submarine tactical doctrine between 1942 and 1945 as new technology and assets became available, enabling the Royal Navy to "replicate a learning organization that successfully could challenge existing norms, objectives, and policies pertaining to trade defense even when applied to geographically diverse theaters of operation".

== See also ==
- Absorptive capacity
- Coherence therapy § Hierarchical organization of constructs
- Higher-order thinking
- Learning cycle
- Learning organization
- Mental model
- Metacognition
- Neurathian bootstrap
- Reflective equilibrium
- Reflective practice
- Second-order cybernetics
