= Human Systems Intervention =

Design and implementation of interventions in social settings

Human Systems Intervention (HSI) is the design and implementation of interventions in social settings where adults are confronted with the need to change their perspectives, attitudes, and actions. Depending on the philosophical and theoretical orientation of the intervener, the process can be approached as a planned, systematic, and collaborative activity.

The field of HSI is based on social science research that seeks to understand social change and to improve the effectiveness of intervening in a diverse range of social systems. Researchers and practitioners who work in this area view human collectives (small groups, teams, community groups, public and private sector organizations, etc.) as systems that behave in ways generally consistent with general, open, or complex adaptive systems theory. They see social change as a process of adaptation and learning that can be studied and supported at individual, group, and larger social system (organizational or network) levels. The field views human systems as dynamic and changing, and as existing within a wider social context with which it has a mutually influential relationship. Some practitioners design and deliver interventions within the context of organization development (OD), relying on action research and action learning approaches.

== Human Systems Intervention Models ==
HSI draws on insights from a variety of academic disciplines, including sociology, anthropology, social psychology, management science, human relations, and community development. Chin and Benne created one of the early frameworks for intervention strategies, arguing that an intervention can be informed by coercive, rational, or normative strategies. More recently, Daniels and DeWine added a fourth strategy, the interpretive approach, based on principles of social constructivism. Proponents often argue that interveners must be aware of the systemic interactions occurring within a human collective, and seek to help members of the collective to gain awareness of how their interactions are contributing to the maintenance of ineffective patterns of behavior. Some argue that interventions should be seen as designs intended to augment a human system's capacity to problem solve and learn. The training of human systems interveners can emphasize the need for self-managed learning that encourages self-awareness, interpersonal communication, data-gathering and diagnostic skills, and a recognition that dialogue is a foundational element in system change.

The soft systems methodology (SSM) developed by Peter Checkland is another example of human systems intervention model, one that is designed specific to human activity, particularly in projects that require cultural intervention. It is multi-staged and is formulated with two core concepts, namely: 1) the hierarchy in systems and the emergent properties at various levels; and, 2) communication and control in human systems. This model is based on the framework of ordering our thoughts "by making conscious the concept of wholeness inherent in the word 'system'".

The HSI models often rely on assessment tools. For instance, there is the case of the so-called Linking Human Systems Intervention model, which focuses on the evaluation of the strengths and themes of resilience instead of vulnerability in the struggle with hardship; the level of stress; the resources available, and the balance of stressors and resources, among others.

== Specialization ==
HSI practitioners often do research and/or practice in the areas of group development, small group leadership, knowledge transfer, organizational development and change, diversity management, management coaching, human resources, and community intervention. Education and training in HSI can be obtained from a variety of sources, including a Masters program in Human Systems Intervention at Concordia University in Montreal, Canada. This integrates theory, values, and skills in the fields of organization development and human systems intervention for those who want to become experts as process consultants. Other programs include:

- National Training Laboratories (NTL)
- The Tavistock Institute

A similar program exists in Switzerland called Human Systems Engineering.
