= Interventions: A Life in War and Peace =

Memoir by Kofi Annan

- Author: Kofi Annan; Nader Mousavizadeh
- Language: English
- Publisher: Penguin Books
- Publication date: 2012
- Media type: Print
- Pages: 383
- ISBN: 9781846142970

Interventions: A Life in War and Peace is a memoir by former Secretary-General of the United Nations and 2001 Nobel Peace Prize winner, Kofi Annan. The book, published in 2012, focuses on the workings of the United Nations Secretariat and the conditions under which the Secretary General has to make decisions. The book is mainly set in the Post–Cold War era when Annan served as the Deputy Secretary General (1993 to 1996) and then as the Secretary General (1997 to 2006) of the United Nations. It was co-written with his former advisor and speechwriter Nader Mousavizadeh.

== Synopsis ==
The book recounts the role of the United Nations and Annan himself in some of the major conflicts during his tenure. During the Rwandan Civil War, United Nations Security Council Resolution 918 was passed to dispatch around 5,500 troops to the United Nations Assistance Mission for Rwanda. However, Annan says that despite lobbying with around 100 governments and calling up many members himself, he did not receive a single serious offer for troop contribution, and that was a deeply formative experience of his career. The book also deals with Annan's efforts as the Secretary-General to focus the efforts of UN and its members on the bigger picture of providing health, education, clean water, and good governance to all. His work in challenging the idea of sovereign immunity claimed by tyrants to inflict suffering on their subjects, by means of setting up the International Criminal Court and establishing special tribunals like the International Criminal Tribunal for the former Yugoslavia is also discussed.

Annan also describes the dilemmas he faced as a diplomat and negotiator, including in dealing with Israel's governments which were building settlements and on giving voice to Hamas which was embracing violence. He says that internal African politics and leadership was the main reason for Africa's woes, and not colonialism or other external factors. Annan also favours intervention in the case of gross violation of human rights, including ones in Kosovo which occurred without UN sanctions. The book discusses the ideal of Responsibility to protect, including its evolution from International Commission on Intervention and State Sovereignty to its adoption. The book is critical of many world leaders including Daniel arap Moi, who was charged with corruption and Thabo Mbeki and Robert Mugabe who were dismissive of the problems poised by AIDS. Annan also reveals that George Bush disliked him and John R. Bolton's appointment as the United States Ambassador to the United Nations was 'hardly a sign of support for me or the institution'.

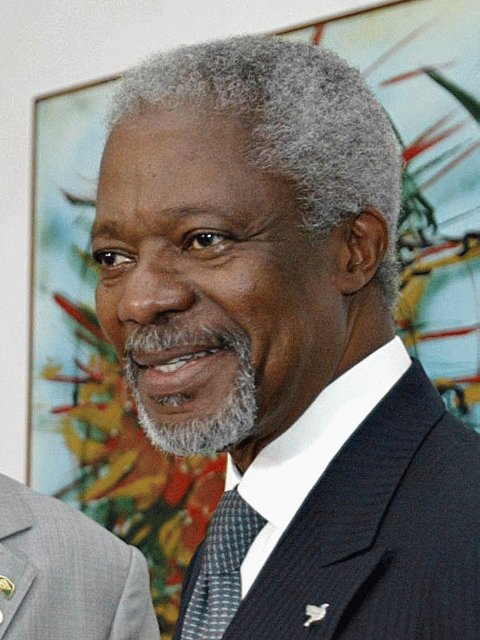
Kofi Annan in 2003

== Reception ==
The book was published in 2012. Chris Mullin in his review for The Daily Telegraph calls it a "good, lucid book by a wise and compassionate man". Bill Gates called the book an "illuminating read" in his review. Rory Stewart in his review for The Guardian labels the book as "well-organised, unaggressive and elegant". The book was among the nominees for the 44th NAACP Image Awards in the Literary Work – Biography/ Auto-Biography category. The book was also listed by The Washington Post in its list of 50 notable works of 2012 in non-fiction.
