= Organizational learning =

Academic discipline; examines how goal-driven social entities add and create knowledge

Organizational learning is the process of creating, retaining, and transferring knowledge within an organization. An organization improves over time as it gains experience. From this experience, it is able to create knowledge. This knowledge is broad, covering any topic that could better an organization. Examples may include ways to increase production efficiency or to develop beneficial investor relations. Knowledge is created at four different units: individual, group, organizational, and inter organizational.

The most common way to measure organizational learning is a learning curve. Learning curves are a relationship showing how as an organization produces more of a product or service, it increases its productivity, efficiency, reliability and/or quality of production with diminishing returns. Learning curves vary due to organizational learning rates. Organizational learning rates are affected by individual proficiency, improvements in an organization's technology, and improvements in the structures, routines and methods of coordination.

== Relevance ==
Organizational learning happens as a function of experience within an organization and allows the organization to stay competitive in an ever-changing environment. Organizational learning is a process improvement that can increase efficiency, accuracy, and profits. A real-world example of organizational learning is how a new pizza store will reduce the cost per pizza as the cumulative production of pizzas increases. As the staff creates more pizza; they begin to make pizzas faster, the staff learns how to work together, and the equipment is placed in the most efficient location leading to cheaper costs of creation. An example of a more formal way to track and support organizational learning is a learning agenda.

Organizational learning is an aspect of organizations and a subfield of organizational studies. As an aspect of an organization, organizational learning is the process of creating, retaining, and transferring knowledge. Knowledge creation, knowledge retention, and knowledge transfer can be seen as adaptive processes that are functions of experience. Experience is the knowledge that contributes to the procedural understanding of a subject through involvement or exposure. Research within organizational learning specifically applies to the attributes and behavior of this knowledge and how it can produce changes in the cognition, routines, and behaviors of an organization and its individuals.

Individuals are predominantly seen as the functional mechanisms for organizational learning by creating knowledge through experience. However, individuals' knowledge only facilitates learning within the organization as a whole if it is transferred. Individuals may withhold their knowledge or exit the organization. Knowledge that is embedded into the organization, in addition to its individuals, can be retained. Organizations can retain knowledge in other ways than just retaining individuals, including using knowledge repositories such as communication tools, processes, learning agendas, routines, networks, and transactive memory systems.

As a subfield, organizational learning is the study of experience, knowledge, and the effects of knowledge within an organizational context. The study of organizational learning directly contributes to the applied science of knowledge management (KM) and the concept of the learning organization. Organizational learning is related to the studies of organizational theory, organizational communication, organizational behavior, organizational psychology, and organizational development. Organizational learning has received contributions from the fields of educational psychology, sociology, economics, anthropology, political science, and management science.

=== Communities of learning ===
Organizations gain knowledge in one of the four organizational communities of learning: individual, team, organizational, and inter-organizational. Organizational learning "involves the process through which organizational communities (e.g. groups, departments, divisions) change as a result of experience." An example of organizational learning is a hospital surgical team learning to use new technology that will increase efficiency.

- Individual learning is the smallest community at which learning can occur. An individual learns new skills or ideas, and their productivity at work may increase as they gain expertise. The individual can decide whether or not to share their knowledge with the rest of the group. If the individual leaves the group and doesn't share their knowledge before leaving, the group loses this knowledge. In their study of software development, Boh, Slaughter and Espinosa (2007) found that individuals were more productive the more specialized experience they had with a certain system.
- Group learning is the next largest community There are conflicting definitions of group learning among researchers studying it. One belief is that group learning is a process in which a group takes action, gets feedback, and uses this feedback to modify their future action. Another belief is that group learning happens when a member shares their individual knowledge with other group members. Others have suggested that group learning is primarily a process of error detection and correction or that group learning is primarily about the processes of interpretation and integration. Once this happens, individual learning turns into group learning. Reagans, Argote, and Brooks (2005) studied group learning by examining joint-replacement surgery in teaching hospitals. They concluded that "increased experience working together in a team promoted better coordination and teamwork." Working together in a team also allowed members to share their knowledge with others and learn from other members. To sum up the different definitions cover following aspects: task independence (what one group member does affects and is affected by another group member); social psychological awareness (members perceive themselves as a group and are perceived as a group); and social embeddedness (the group exists in a larger social system).
- Organizational learning is the way in which an organization creates and organizes knowledge relating to their functions and culture. Organizational learning happens in all of the organization's activities, and it happens in different speeds. The goal of organizational learning is to successfully adapt to changing environments, to adjust under uncertain conditions, and to increase efficiency. According to Argote (1993), managers in manufacturing plants saw organization learning occur when they found ways to make individual workers more proficient, improve the organization's "technology, tooling, and layout," improve the organization's structure, and determine the organization's strengths.
- Interorganizational learning is the way in which different organizations in an alliance collaborate, share knowledge, and learn from one another. An organization is able to improve its "processes and products by integrating new insights and knowledge" from another organization. By learning from another organization, an organization is able to cut time costs, decrease the risks associated with problem solving, and learn faster. Learning from another organization can mean either applying the same ideas used by that organization or modifying these ideas, thereby creating innovation. Inter-organizational learning occurs frequently in fixed business models, such as franchising. The franchisee looking to use the franchisor's brand has to learn how to use the organization's business model before starting a franchise.

=== History of study ===
The origin of the focused study of organizational learning can be traced to the late 1970s, when researchers studied it from a psychological viewpoint. Key advances in the field include:

- Behavioral psychology and organizational development: In their 1978 work on organizational learning, Chris Argyris and Donald Schön developed the concepts of single-loop and double-loop learning. Single-loop learning is the process in which a mistake is corrected by using a different strategy or method that is expected to yield a different, successful outcome. Take, for example, a person who acts a certain way to accomplish a certain goal. If this person's actions fail in accomplishing the goal, with single-loop learning, this person will reflect on their previous actions and, going forward, they will take a different set of actions to accomplish the same goal. Double-loop learning, on the other hand, is a more complicated process in which a mistake is corrected by rethinking the initial goal. In the previous example, the person would show double-loop learning if they chose to reevaluate their goal and beliefs instead of simply reassessing their failed actions. They will then take a set of actions that are aligned with their reevaluated goals and beliefs. Argyris and Schön explain that both single-loop and double-loop learning processes are present in organizations and are two types of organizational learning. Single-loop learning occurs when an organization detects a mistake, corrects it, and carries on with its present policies and objectives. Double-loop learning occurs when an organization detects a mistake and changes its policies and objectives before it can take corrective actions.
- Adaptation and routines: In their book defining the behavioral theory of the firm, Richard Cyert and James G. March described organizational learning as an organization's adaptive behavior over time. This consists of the adaptation of goals, adaptation in attention rules, and adaptation in search rules. Part of organizational learning is setting goals and changing these goals over time. They change along with an organization's members are established as problems arise. When setting goals, an organization should consider three variables: "the organization's past goal, the organization's past performance, and the past performance of other 'comparable' organizations." Adapting an organization's attention rules consists of determining which parts of an organization's environment requires most attention. Cyert and March give the example of the criteria an organization uses to evaluate employees' performances. Over time, organizations learn which criteria to use for their evaluations and how much weight to assign to each criterion. They also use the example of selecting which criteria to use when comparing one's organization with a similar one. An organization's adaptation in search rules refers to its ability to find solutions for its problems. Since a solution depends on the problem, an organization's search rules will change accordingly. Typically, an organization will be more likely to search for a solution a certain way if this search method previously succeeded in finding a solution. An organization's search rules will depend on its previous successes or failures with the alternative search rules.
- Learning curves by Dutton & Thomas (1984): John M. Dutton and Annie Thomas organized field studies on various industries to study the rates of learning in organizations. They found that workers' errors and/or costs decrease as they learn from experience. However, since the knowledge that workers' can learn lessens over time, they cannot improve their performance at a constant rate. Instead, the rate by which they improve decreases with more experience. Dutton and Thomas also found that there are four causal categories that affect a firm's progress. Two categories, exogenous and endogenous learning, describe the source of a firm's progress. Exogenous learning occurs when a firm acquires information from external sources that allow it to progress. Examples of external sources include "suppliers, customers, competitors, and government." Endogenous learning occurs when employees learn from within the firm, which is "manifested by technical changes, direct-labor learning, and smoothing production flows." The other two categories, induced and autonomous learning, describe the environments in which progress occurs. Induced learning occurs when a firm makes investments or adds resources to an environment to make it conducive for learning. Autonomous learning occurs when sustained production leads to automatic improvements over long periods of time.

== Knowledge ==
Knowledge is an indicator of organizational learning. Organization learning happens when there is a change in the knowledge of an organization. Researchers measure organizational knowledge in various ways. For example, some researchers assess knowledge as changes in an organization's practices or routines that increase efficiency. Other researchers base it on the number of patents an organization has. Knowledge management is the process of collecting, developing, and spreading knowledge assets to enable organizational learning.

=== Nature of knowledge ===
Knowledge is not a homogenous resource. Although it is related to data and information, knowledge is different from these constructs. Data are a set of defined, objective facts concerning events, while information is a value-added form of data that adds meaning through contextualization, categorization, calculation, correction, or condensation. Knowledge is the applied version of information, a combination of information within experience, framing, value, contextualization, and insight. Experience is knowledge that is generated through exposure to and application of knowledge. Knowledge originates within and is applied by units of an organization to evaluate and utilize experience and information effectively. Knowledge can become embedded within repositories, routines, processes, practices, tools, and norms, depending on the relationship between information, experience, and knowledge.

Two distinct forms of knowledge, explicit and tacit, are significant in this respect. Explicit knowledge is codified, systematic, formal, and easy to communicate. Tacit knowledge is personal, context-specific, subjective knowledge.

- Explicit knowledge is knowledge that is easy to transfer. Unlike tacit knowledge, explicit knowledge is declarative or factual. It is transferred through written, verbal, or codified media. Examples of this include instructions, definitions, and documents. Among its employees, Toyota spreads explicit knowledge about its assembly line production. Toyota requires each team of workers and each individual worker to document their tasks, providing detailed descriptions on "how each task is to be performed, how long each task should take, the sequence of steps to be followed in performing each task, and the steps to be taken by each worker in checking his or her own work." This uses explicit knowledge since the knowledge is passed along using a code, which is a document of detailed descriptions in Toyota's case.
- Tacit knowledge is knowledge that is difficult to transfer. As first described by Michael Polanyi, tacit knowledge is the knowledge of procedures. It is a personal type of knowledge that cannot be shared simply through written or verbal communication. It is learned mostly through experience over time. For example, Toyota transfers tacit knowledge whenever it opens a new assembly factory. To train its new employees for a new factory, Toyota sends a group of its new employees to work at one of its established factories, where experienced employees train them. After this long-term training, they are sent back to the new factory to transfer their production knowledge to the rest of the new employees. This is a transfer of tacit knowledge since this knowledge is too complex to be codified and passed along through a document. This knowledge can only be transferred to new employees through practice and experience.

=== Measuring learning ===
Organizational learning tracks the changes that occur within an organization as it acquires knowledge and experience. To evaluate organizational learning, the knowledge an organization creates, transfers, and retains must be quantified.

Researchers studying organizational learning have measured the knowledge acquired through various ways since there is no one way of measuring it. Silvia Gherardi measured knowledge as the change in practices within an organization over time, which is essentially learning from experience. In her study, she observed an organization acquire knowledge as its novices working at building sites learned about safety through experience and became practitioners. George Huber measured knowledge as the distribution of information within an organization. In his study, he noted that "organizational components commonly develop 'new' information by piecing together items of information that they obtain from other organizational units." He gives the example of "a shipping department [that] learns that a shortage problem exists by comparing information from the warehouse with information from the sales department."

An increasingly common and versatile measure of organizational learning is an organizational learning curve demonstrating experience curve effects. A learning curve measures the rate of a metric of learning relative to a metric for experience. Linda Argote explains that "large increases in productivity typically occur as organizations gain experience in production." However, Argote also notes that organizations' rates of learning vary. Argote identifies three factors that affect these rates: increased proficiency of individuals, improvements in an organization's technology, and improvements in its structure (such as its routines and methods of coordination). Some organizations show great productivity gains while others show little or no gains, given the same amount of experience.The experience curves plot the decreasing unit cost versus the total cumulative units produced, a common way to measure the effect of experience. The linear-linear input form on the left is transformed into the log-log form on the right to demonstrate that the proficiency increase correlates with experience.

=== Theoretical models ===
Attempts to explain variance of rates in organizational learning across different organizations have been explored in theoretical models. Namely the theoretical models conceived by John F. Muth, Bernardo Huberman, and Christina Fang.

- The Muth model (1986) was the first to represent the learning curve in a log-linear form and focused on cost effectiveness in organization processes. This model looks at the relationship between unit cost and experience, stating that cost reductions are realized through independent random sampling, or randomized searches, from a space of technological, managerial, or behavioral alternatives. This model did not aim to explore variation across firms, but solely looked at improvements in production with experience within a single firm.
- The Huberman model (2001) filled that void and aimed at explaining the variation missing from Muth's model and focuses on finding increasingly shorter and more efficient paths from end to end of an assembly process. This model is visualized best in a connected graph with nodes that represent stages in a process and links that represent the connecting routines. By way of this model, learning can occur through two mechanisms that shorten the route from the initial stage to the final stage. The first is by some shortcut that can be identified by looking at the nodes and mapping and discovering new routines, the ideal goal being able to eliminate certain touch points and find shorter paths from the initial to final node. The second mechanism involves improving the routines: the organization can work to select the most efficacious link between two nodes such that, if an issue ever arises, members of an organization know exactly whom to approach, saving them a considerable amount of time.
- The Fang model (2011) shares a major goal with the Huberman model: to gradually decrease the steps towards the final stage. However, this model takes more of a "credit assignment" approach in which credit is assigned to successive states as an organization gains more experience, and then learning occurs by way of credit propagation. This implies that as an organization gains more experience with the task, it is better able to develop increasingly accurate mental models that initially identify the values of states closer to the goal and then those of states farther from the goal. This then leads to a reduced number of steps to reach the organization's final goal and can thus improve overall performance.

=== Context and learning ===
An organization's experience affects its learning, so it is important to also study the context of the organizational climate, which affects an organization's experience. This context refers to an organization's characteristics, specifically its "structure, culture, technology, identity, memory, goals, incentives, and strategy." It also includes its environment, which consists of its competitors, clients, and regulators. While this context establishes how knowledge is acquired by the organization, this knowledge modifies context as the organization adapts to it. The leader-initiated cultural context of learning has inspired key research into whether the organization has a learning or performance orientation, an environment of psychological safety, the group's superordinate identity, and group dynamics. Research into these concepts like Edmondson's study (1999) shows that an organization operating under a context promoting curiosity, information sharing, and psychological safety encourages organizational learning. "Group learning dynamics" is the subject of how groups share, generate, evaluate, and combine knowledge as they work together.

=== Organizational forgetting ===
Knowledge acquired through learning by doing can depreciate over time. The depreciation rate is affected by the turnover rate of individuals and how knowledge is stored within the organization. Organizations with higher turnover rates will lose more knowledge than others. Organizations with knowledge embedded in technology rather than individuals are more resistant to organizational forgetting. Examples: In the Liberty Shipyard study, in shipyards where relative input was reduced, individual unit cost increased even with increasing cumulative output. In shipyards with no relative input reduction, individual unit cost decreased with increasing cumulative output. In a study of airplane manufacturing at Lockheed, unit costs declined with experience, but this effect weakened over time.

== Processes ==
Three key processes that drive organizational learning are knowledge creation, knowledge retention, and knowledge transfer.

=== Knowledge creation ===
Knowledge creation specifically concerns Experience that can be embedded within the organization. Experience is knowledge generated by direct exposure to the subject. This direct exposure is through tasks involving the needs, processes, and environment of the organization. Explicit and tacit knowledge are reinforced and become contextualized when the organization gains knowledge. While experience can produce outputs in data, information, or knowledge, experience in the form of knowledge is useful since this can be transferred, retained, and tacitly or explicitly utilized within organizational processes. Knowledge creation connects to creativity and its relationship to experience. Compared to knowledge transfer and knowledge retention, knowledge creation has not received much research attention.

Dimensions of experience are aspects of experience that impact the form and function of knowledge creation.

- The organizational dimension refers to the directness or indirectness of experience acquired in addition to the configurations of individuals, units, and networks.
- The spatial dimension refers to the geographic concentration or dispersion of the experience.
- The temporal dimension refers to frequency and pace at which the experience is acquired or its temporal relation to a task.
- The content dimension refers to the subject task or unit, outcome, novelty, heterogeneity, and ambiguity.
- The artificiality dimension refers to the directness of the experience and the degree to which the experience is fabricated, adapted, or transcribed.

=== Knowledge transfer ===
Knowledge transfer concerns the mechanisms by which experience spreads and embeds itself within the organization. Knowledge transfer can be evaluated using various metrics, including learning curves that demonstrate process improvements over time by comparing the decrease in labor hours to complete a unit of production with the cumulative units produced over time. Wright's identification of organizational learning curves preceded more complex outcome considerations that now inform measures of knowledge transfer. While knowledge may transfer tacitly and explicitly as direct experience, organizations can introduce processes and knowledge management systems that facilitate this transfer. Researchers investigate the context of various factors and mechanisms affecting knowledge transfer to determine their beneficial and detrimental effects.

Factors of knowledge transfer include the dimensions of the knowledge described in the prior section, as well as the contexts in which it occurs and mechanisms through which it can occur:

- Relational context concerns whether knowledge is interconnected.
- Cognitive context concerns mental abilities and processes regarding knowledge.
- Motivational context of personal preferences and social influences affect direct or indirect knowledge transfer behaviors.
- Emotional context impacts mental state and sense of security, which affect knowledge transfer.
- Social networks determine the flows through which knowledge can transfer and the node-based conditional limitations on transfer.
- Personnel movement between units and organizations impacts available knowledge and geographical, chronological, and social limitations on knowledge transfer.
- Routines impact knowledge transfer as they contain embedded knowledge and teach it through experience repeating the routine.
- Templates affect knowledge transfer as they affect the framing, priming, volume, and content parameters for formal exchanges of knowledge.
- Alliances impact knowledge transfer between formal and informal groups.

=== Knowledge retention ===
Knowledge retention concerns the behavior of knowledge that has been embedded within the organization, characterized by the organizational memory. Organizational memory, quantified by measures such as cumulative knowledge and the rate of decay over time, is impacted by experience, processes and knowledge repositories that affect knowledge retention. Knowledge repositories are of key significance as they are intentional remedies to increase retention. Repositories can include the organization's rules and routines, altered by the processes of routine development and routine modification. Transactive memory systems are additional methods by which knowledge holders within the organization can be identified and utilized, subject to their development and performance. Organizations that retain the bulk of their knowledge in individuals are vulnerable to lose that information with high turn over rates. In a study of organizational learning in the automotive and fast food industries, Argote found that high turn over rates lead to lower productivity and decreased organizational memory.

== Applications ==
Applications of organizational learning research and contexts for organizational learning facilitation and practices are numerous. Experience curves can be used to make projections of production costs, compare performance across units, identify the effects of various processes and practices, and make informed financial decisions about how to allocate resources. Utilizing knowledge transfer and retention concepts to recognize, maintain, and reclaim embedded knowledge can help organizations become more efficient with their knowledge. Organizational learning theories and knowledge management practices can be applied to organizational design and leadership decisions.

== Knowledge management practices ==
Various knowledge management concepts and practices are the relevant products of organizational learning research. Work on knowledge transfer applies to knowledge retention and contributes to many of the applications listed below, including the practices of building learning organizations, implementing knowledge management systems, and its context for inter organizational learning and the diffusion of innovations.

=== Development of learning organizations ===
Learning organizations are organizations that actively work to optimize learning. Learning organizations use the active process of knowledge management to design organizational processes and systems that concretely facilitate knowledge creation, transfer, and retention. Organizational metacognition is used to refer to the processes by which the organization 'knows what it knows'. The study of organizational learning and other fields of research such as organizational development, System theory, and cognitive science provide the theoretical basis for specifically prescribing these interventions. An example of an organizational process implemented to increase organizational learning is the U.S. Army's use of a formally structured de-brief process called an after-action review (AAR) to analyze what happened, why it happened, and how it could be improved immediately after a mission. Learning laboratories are a type or learning organization dedicate to knowledge creation, collection, and control.

Learning organizations also address organizational climate by creating a supportive learning environment and practicing leadership that reinforces learning. Creating a supportive learning environment and reinforcing learning depends on the leadership of the organization and the culture it promotes. Leaders can create learning opportunities by facilitating environments that include learning activities, establishing a culture of learning via norms, behaviors, and rules, and lead processes of discourse by listening, asking questions, and providing feedback. Leaders must practice the individual learning they advocate for by remaining open to new perspectives, being aware of personal biases, seeking exposure to unfiltered and contradictory sources of information, and developing a sense of humility.

=== Knowledge management systems ===
While learning processes depend on the context for optimizing knowledge transfer, the implementation of knowledge management systems incorporates technology into these processes. Knowledge management systems are technologies that serve as a repository, communication, or collaboration tool for transferring and retaining knowledge. Embedding knowledge in technology can prevent organizational forgetting and allow knowledge to transfer across barriers such as distance, organizational unit, and specialization. Knowledge management systems alone are not necessarily successful, but as a communication tool they tangibly reinforce individuals' ability to spread and reinforce their knowledge.

=== Diffusion of innovation ===
Organizational learning is important to consider in relation to innovation, entrepreneurship, technological change, and economic growth, specifically within the contexts of knowledge sharing and inter organizational learning. As one of the key dynamics behind the knowledge economy, organizational learning informs our understanding of knowledge transfer between organizations. Heterogeneous experience yields better learning outcomes than homogenous experience, and knowledge diffusion spreads heterogeneous experience across organizations. Diffusion of innovations theory explores how and why people adopt new ideas, practices and products. It may be seen as a subset of the anthropological concept of diffusion and can help to explain how ideas are spread by individuals, social networks, and organizations. Innovation policy, economic development initiatives, educational program endeavors, and entrepreneurial incubation and acceleration could all be informed by organizational learning practices.

=== Knowledge protection ===
Digital transformation means that not only machines and IT but also people are digitally interlinked. Knowledge cannot be directly secured same way as information is protected. There are formal and informal methods that can be used to protect organizational knowledge. Formal methods include Legal methods - such as confidentiality agreements, patents, copyrights, licensees and trademarks - and Technical methods - such as protecting communication channels, systems and storage and technically constraining the access to the knowledge. Informal methods instead include secrecy, education, social norms and complexity, i.e. carefully choosing what knowledge to share and to whom, and making sure others do the same. The formal and informal methods should be used in good balance.

=== Internal knowledge Sharing Mechanism ===
The internal knowledge sharing mechanism can promote and develop the enterprise's continuous learning and innovation capabilities and play a role in motivating employees to exchange knowledge with each other. The internal knowledge sharing mechanism can enable enterprises to improve the efficiency of product innovation through the recombination of cooperative knowledge and competitive knowledge.

The internal knowledge sharing mechanism is the way for enterprises to obtain knowledge from competitors. Enterprises first need to obtain available knowledge from competitors, and then internalize, transform and use this new knowledge according to their own company characteristics.

== Barriers and enablers to organizational learning ==
=== Corporate amnesia ===
In case no systematic approach has been applied when creating organizational memory systems, there is a risk of corporate amnesia. Environment of organizational amnesia leads to avoiding mistakes at all cost. Companies should create an environment where learning from mistakes is allowed in order to avoid them happening again. Corporate amnesia is said to be a double-edged sword – it helps to move on by forgetting the wrongdoing, but at the same time it creates a danger of repeating the same error all over again.

=== Developing organizational memory ===
Organizations need to have an organizational memory, a documentation of their milestone events. That documentation needs to be accessible for all involved to have the ability to learn as an organization. Because organizations have a routine of forgetting what they have done in the past and why, organizational memory systems should be created to make the knowledge explicit so that the transparency, coordination and communication in the organizations increase and it becomes possible to learn from past mistakes. OL grows through processes but the essential material is individual's memory, culture and experience. Individual learning is the first level in OL. Transfer process to OL is synthesized by "what people learn (know-what) and how they understand and apply this learning (know-how). While learning is the know-how, memory could be perceived as a storage area. Memory plays an active role in a learning process. In a transfer mechanism, mental models are an excellent way to share knowledge and to make it independent from individuals.

Organizational memory is an agglomerate of individual's memory, composed by data, information and knowledge. For those three levels of learning, five retention facilities are available:

- Individuals, with their own memory capacity and experience
- Culture, perceived and thought experience transmitted to the members of the organization. Language is a cultural information transmitted repeatedly
- Transformation, the logic and repeated continuation of actions transforming an input into an output
- Structure, link between an individual and its role in the organization
- External archives, information retailed by sources outside the organization about its past.

The big deal of organizational memory is its availability to be used and re-used. It could represent a competitive advantage but its value is often underestimated because of the complexity to calculate it, even though sometimes employee's, customer's, supplier's, capital's and top management's memory values are budgeted.

Organization's memory needs technological solutions on its side. Technology is often associated with information or communication technology (IT) which relates to different software solutions that support the organization's memory and ease the transfer of knowledge . Technology can be a barrier if it is not accepted or there is not enough understanding of new technologies. Technology can open for example new ways of communicating, but it is different to find a shared acceptance for its utilization.

IT is an enabler for codifying and distributing data and information as well as both tacit and explicit knowledge. A. Abdulaziz Al-Tameem also states that the interaction between humans and IT enhances OL. Different repositories are used within organization to store corporate knowledge as an extension for the memory. Maintaining organizational memory is enabler for efficient and effective processes and routines but most of all for profitable business. Traditionally, IT was regarded solely as a tool to support human learning. In contrast, with the advent of machine learning in organizations, IT based on machine learning algorithms is now viewed as a further type of organizational learner that learns side-by-side along human learners and can offer its own contributions to organizational learning. To this end, today's organizations form complex systems of interrelated human and machine learning that requires coordination and rises a wide range of new managerial issues.

=== The role of organizational culture ===
Culture is considered as the holding strength between members of an organization. Culture brings a representation of past learning and an instrument to communicate it through the organization.

Finding shared vision is important to enable the adaptation of new systems and technologies that can be accepted by the organization and its members. Sharing a culture and encouraging knowledge sharing allows more efficient transfer of knowledge in organization between its levels. Sharing information between different cultures can be limited due to varying norms and it can end up in one or both sides hoarding knowledge.

Willingness to inquire can also be related to differences between culture groups or culture of multicultural organizations in general. Status, modesty, fear of embarrassment, etc. contribute to the interaction we decide or do not decide to initiate. It has been studied that organizational culture is one of the most important enablers in knowledge sharing. When the information is not shared due to hoarding based on cultural differences it becomes a major barrier in business.

Different influential factors regarding characteristics of an organizational culture (especially in knowledge-centered cultures) affect the processes of knowledge management. these can include:

- Social interactions
- Openness in communication
- Trust
- Perception of knowledge
- Top management's support and involvement
- Freedom vs. control
- Compensation system (organizational rewards)

=== Virtual environments ===
Organizations are evolving, which is sometimes causing interpretation of experiences more complex. Team members that are geographically apart, may only have an option to learn virtually through electronic devices instead of face-to-face. Communities of practice in virtual environments can create tacit knowledge shared between the different factors such as individual members, rules accepted and technologies used. Technology in this case affects the identity and learning patterns of the community. Building routines in a virtual team and the use of sophisticated technology such as video meetings, creates trust and psychological safety that enables learning.

=== Barriers in organizational learning from 4I framework ===
Developed by Crossan, Lane and White (1999) the 4I framework of organizational learning consists of four social processes; intuiting, interpreting, integrating and institutionalizing. It is proposed by Crossan et al. (1999) that organizational learning is a dynamic and iterative process between exploration and exploitation (March 1991) with feed forward flowing from individual level to organizational level and feedback from organizational to individual. A pivotal characteristic of the framework is the relationship and interplay between action and cognition that it assumes and portrays. It is a framework that was developed to specifically address the phenomenon of strategic renewal.

J. Schilling and A. Kluge (2009) have contributed to the M. Crossan, H. Lane and R. White (1999) 4I framework of organizational learning by identifying the barriers to the learning process. There is a wide variety of barriers in every level of each learning process identified as actional-personal, structural-organizational and societal-environmental.

Actional-personal barriers include such as individual attitudes, thinking, and behavior. Structural-organizational barriers are based in organizational technology, strategy, culture and formality of regulations. In addition to the 4I model, environment is also considered as relevant at all individual, group and organization levels and that is why societal-environmental barriers are also considered. Intuition process barriers are related to individual's lack of motivation or such as what is the freedom in the organization to 'think out of the box'. Societal-environmental barriers of intuition process relate e.g. to the unclear success criteria of the branch of the organization or to cultural misunderstandings. Interpretation process barrier can be e.g. lack of status or a conflict in a relationship between innovator and the group. Integration process barriers that take place at the organizational level can be such as the willingness to maintain positive self-image or the fear of punishment. If the idea is against beliefs commonly held in the industry, the whole sector might reject the idea. A major barrier is, if there is no top management's support for the innovative idea. A barrier to institutionalization process is when something previously learned has been forgotten – an innovation or lesson has not been put to practice so that it would become embedded into the structure, procedures and strategy. Some teams or employees may not have enough skills or knowledge to absorb the innovation or there is not enough trust towards the innovation. Management may also have a lack of skills to implement the innovation.

=== Other challenges ===
Several challenges may be identified during the organizational learning process. Milway and Saxton (2011) suggest three challenges related to goals, incentives and processes.

Generational issues and employee turnover are also challenges that organizations might have to consider.

== See also ==
- Action learning
- Activity theory
- Air-defense experiments
- Ambidextrous organization
- Bus factor
- Collaborating, learning and adapting
- Collaborative learning
- Community of innovation
- Community of inquiry
- Community of practice
- Cultural-historical activity theory
- Fail fast (business)
- Just-in-time learning
- Knowledge capture
- Knowledge organization
- Learning network
- Organization workshop
- Organizational memory
- Sociomapping
- Strategic Choice Theory
- Success trap
- Text and conversation theory
- Value network
- Value network analysis
