= Business fable =

Motivational parable or fictional story

A business fable (also termed business fiction or leadership fable) is a motivational fable, parable or other fictional story that shares a lesson or lessons that are intended to be applied in the business world with the aim to improve leadership skills, personal skills, or the organizational culture. Business fables are intended to show readers how different leadership, project management, and other tools can be used in real life situations. The genre saw a peak in the early 2000s.

Despite predictions from the Harvard Business Review, business fables are still being produced and read. Patrick Lencioni and Jon Gordon continue their long standing writing careers in the genre of leadership fables. In addition several independents and authors from smaller publishing houses are joining the genre. Lencioni, who wrote one of the highest rated business books on Goodreads, is helping new authors to write their business fables.

Business fables may not provide all the details found in a traditional business book, but a fictional narrative is meant to affect the emotions of the audience, unlike a conventional tome. Some authors and publishers are providing details into the key aspects of how to write a successful Business fable. Others point out the flaws like in some business fables and how authors could improve their stories. Many authors augment their business fables with workbooks and materials that can be downloaded from their websites.

== Bestsellers ==
New York Times bestsellers in the business fable genre include:

- Johnson, Spencer; Blanchard, Ken (1998). Who moved my cheese? : An a-mazing way to deal with change in your work and in your life. Penguin Publishing Group. ISBN 978-1-101-49587-2.
- Blanchard, Ken; Johnson, Spencer (1982). The one minute manager. New York: William Morrow. ISBN 978-0-688-01429-2. OCLC 8475284.
- Lencioni, Patrick (2002). The five dysfunctions of a team: A leadership fable. San Francisco: Jossey-Bass. ISBN 978-0-7879-6075-9. OCLC 48588434.
- Andrews, Andy (2002). The traveler's gift: Seven decisions that determine personal success. Nashville: T. Nelson Publishers. ISBN 978-0-7852-6428-6. OCLC 49942201.
- Swanepoel, Stefan (2011). Surviving Your Serengeti: 7 Skills to Master Business and Life. Wiley. ISBN 978-1-118-00859-1.
- Kotter, John Paul; Rathgeber, Holger (2005). Our Iceberg is Melting: Changing and succeeding under adverse conditions. Authors. ISBN 978-0-230-01685-9. Later republished by St. Martin's Press, Macmiliians, and Portfolio.

Other notable business fables include:

- Goldratt, Eliyahu M.; Cox, J. (1984). The Goal: A Process of Ongoing Improvement. Pretoria, South Africa: National Productivity Institute. ISBN 978-0-947015-45-9.
- Burg, Bob; Mann, John David (2007). The go-giver: A Little Story about a Powerful Business Idea. Portfolio. ISBN 978-1-59184-200-2.
- Fish! Philosophy by Stephen Lundin (2000)
- The Chicken and the Pig

== See also ==
- Appeal to emotion – Informal logical fallacy
- Informal fallacy – Form of incorrect argument in natural language
- Self-help book – Instructional book for solving personal problems
- Motivational speaker – Speaker intended to motivate the audience
- Popular psychology – Simplified everyday psychology
- Management fad – Pejorative term for organizational practice
