= Experimental organisational development =

Organisational management method

Experimental organisational development (ExOD) is the theory and practice of using small, science‑inspired experiments to help organisations change and learn. ExOD uses a continuous cycle of forming hypotheses, experimenting and learning to create locally valid knowledge inside the organisation itself. This approach of combining change management tool with evidence‑based steps helps organisations to stay stable and innovative in today's fast‑changing environments.

== Background ==
=== Historical context ===
The first origin of experimental organisational development stems from the movement of scientific management in the 1910s, also known as "Taylorism". It was the beginning of organisations applying scientific principles to understand and design its structure and processes. More and more research undertaken to understand the sociopsychological dynamics within organisations, like the Hawthorne experiments in the 1920s, and the Milgram experiment in the 1960s. Experiments became an increasingly prominent factor in organisational theory. Finally, Edgar Schein laid the foundation for ExOD by concluding, that intervention, like experiments, into an organisation is necessary in order to truly understand it.

=== Reaction to growing complexity ===
Today, experimentation is seen as central to societal and technological progress, with achieved standards being the results of previous experiments. These technical advances have accelerated experimentation itself, with e.g. computer simulations becoming a possibility. At the same time, technological progress has caused the environments of organisations to dynamically and grow in complexity. Especially the digital transformation and post-pandemic developments have contributed to this trend. Experimental organisational development is seen as a reaction to this increasingly VUCA world. It claims to be a way for organisations to deal with this new environment.

=== Knowledge management ===
One effects of this increased dynamic and complexity is that there are more unknowns about both present and future. This lack of knowledge needs to be managed by organisations, as knowledge itself is becoming an increasingly important and value driving resource. ExOD is seen as a way to deal with the unknown and improve organisational learning.

Another effect is that universal 'truths' and best-practices become less and less applicable, especially as organisations are increasingly understood as complex social structures. This has caused a cultural shift towards more evidence-based management, where decisions are based on the best evidence, instead of on the best practice. This evidence can be both external evidence, from scientific sources, and internal, locally generated evidence. ExOD is seen as both a way for organisations to generate such local knowledge and to overcome the challenge of implementing external knowledge, through experimentation. Philipp D. Schaller however notes that experiments themselves are not necessarily 'plug-and-play', similar to best-practices.

=== Innovation ===
Organisations traditionally value predictability and stability to achieve a continuous value creation. This however stands in conflict with innovation and organisational development. As a consequence, organisations have an inherent reluctance to experimentation. A key to ExOD is however, that as the environment organisations constantly changes, organisations need to constantly change themselves. The desired stability requires active intervention and a state of controlled instability.

Whilst experimental organisational development is considered as a tool to give structure and system to moving forward as an organisation, literature around it heavily favours innovation. Innovation is seen as both a necessity and key to success for organisations. Experiments aren't only seen as essential for innovation, but also as a way to shape and design the organisation. An experimental approach could also reduce the pressure and doubt within organisational development in general.

== Methodology ==
At the centre of experimental organisational development is the proposition that organisations should move from exploiting existing theoretical knowledge towards exploring new empirical evidence. It lines out the advantages of inductive reasoning over deductive reasoning for organisations. It concludes best way to generate knowledge inductively to be experimentation. Experimentation being a critical tool for organisational development, it attributes four main functions to experiments in organisations:

1. Exploration (finding new solutions)
2. Approximation (optimising solutions)
3. Testing of hypotheses
4. Convincing (e.g. of doubters)

=== Learning focus ===
Unlike traditional organisational development, the focus of ExOD is entirely on learning and understanding. Experiments will always create new insight, even if they 'fail', as long as its design was systematic (following scientific principles), and the focus was on learning. With this approach, experimental organisational development differentiates itself from concepts like test and learn. Philipp D. Schaller derives five different forms of how learning through experimentation is implemented in organisations:

1. organisational learning (the organisation learns about itself)
2. learning organisation (the organisation learns practices)
3. organisational experiments (scientists learn about organisations)
4. experimenting organisation (the organisation has institutionalised experimentation)
5. business experiment (a tool to solve individual problems in the organisation)

=== Experiment design ===
There are a high number of forms of experiments, like field experiments or experiments in laboratorial settings. Whilst in principle, all forms of experiments are suitable for learning, the best fit depends on the organisation and situation. As the general goal is to learn and create local evidence, high internal validity is a critical factor. Whilst that does suggest the use of laboratorial settings, the consensus is that for experiments in and around organisations, field experiments are the gold standard. A potential solution is the upcoming concept of "experimentation rooms". These are temporary, metaphorically secluded environments within organisations, where selected employees can experiment without any risk or fear of errors.

Independent of the chosen forms, experimental organisational development requires an iterative, cyclical process of experimenting and learning. Each iteration consists of formulating a hypothesis, designing and executing a suitable experiment, and analysing the collected data. Depending on the results, the hypothesis should be refined (see double-loop learning), rejected, or the solution rolled out, whilst keeping an eye out for any serendipitous discoveries.

== Application ==
This method of learning and decision-making can be applied in any type of organisation, or integrated into the classical architecture of change management and organisational development. It is considered an effective and efficient tool to develop and implement desired changes or managerial ideas. The reversibility of interventions in this method reduces costs and risks for the organisation, increasing motivation whilst reducing resistances.

A critical factor for a successful application is for the organisation to have or adopt an organisational culture, which views failures with tolerance, positivity, and a focus on learning. A broader culture of experimentation and open-ended approaches is equally beneficial. There are several further variables to improve the effectiveness and efficiency of ExOD even further. Among these are experiment portfolios as control measure, provision of an experimenting infrastructure, and general support from the organisation's management.

A major drawback seems to be, that only a few managers in organisations have learned the principles and practices of experimentation. A successful application would benefit from subsequent education. For this, support from scientific professionals is seen as more useful than from traditional change managers or business consultant.

=== Examples ===
Approaches like the experimental organisational development have seen growth in popularity with several leading companies claiming their success to be partially based on leveraging experimentation and knowledge generation. One of the most prominent examples for this experimental, iterative and failure-learning-focused approach is SpaceX, who have generated a unique amount of knowledge, progress and success this way. Further examples include the CERN IdeaSquare, the experimentation rooms of the AOK Baden-Württemberg, or the logistics management of H&M.

== See also ==
- Design thinking
- Evidence-based management
- Lean startup
- Change management
