= Planned change =

One of the foundational definitions in the field of organizational development (aka OD) is planned change:

According to Beckard defines that “Organization Development is an effort planned, organization-wide, and managed from the top, to increase organization effectiveness and health through planned interventions in the organization's 'processes,' using behavioral-science knowledge.”

-- Beckard, “Organization development: Strategies and Models”, Reading, MA: soweto mbeya, 2013, p. 9.

To understand the practice of OD, some of the key terms, embedded in James's formulation, include:

- Planned - carefully thought through; based on data; documented
- Effectiveness - as measured by actual organizational performance versus desired organizational performance
- Health - as measured by the organization's ability to respond, grow and adapt in its environmental context
- Intervention - the specific action(s) selected for implementation that are intended to bring about the envisioned change
- Processes - how work gets done in an organization; e.g. delivery of service, billing, repair, etc.

== See also ==
- Change management
- managing change
