= Generations in the workforce =

Generational age gaps in the workforce

The working environment has gone through a major transformation over the last decades, particularly in terms of population in the workforce. The generations dominating the workforce in 2026 are baby boomers, Generation X, millennials and Generation Z. The coming decades will see further changes with emergence of newer generations, and slower removal of older generations from organisations as pension age is pushed out. Many reports, including a publication by Therese Kinal and Olga Hypponen of Unleash, warn that understanding differences between the generations, and learning to adapt their management practices is critical to building a successful multigenerational workplace.

== Baby boomers ==
Baby boomers are people born approximately between 1946 and 1964, directly after the resolution of World War II. The United States experienced a greatly elevated birth rate after the war, causing this generation to be one of the largest in a century. Boomers who have had careers tend to have a strong sense of company loyalty and many take pride at having worked at the same company for decades. Many modern Boomers are retiring or are retired, and this creates concerns for some as traditional retirement systems and pensions that many have paid into for years become uncertain. Baby Boomers have been often ascribed as technology resistant, and slower to adopt computers and smart phones than more recent generations who have grown up with them. This has created a sharp divide in how Boomers and modern generations see and interact with the world, including relationships, consumption of media, news sources, and spending habits. For example, Baby Boomers are the largest consumers of cable television today, while modern generations frequently do not see cable television as a priority.

Boomers were brought up in a healthy post war economy and saw the world revolving around them as the largest generation of the century. Their lifestyle is to live for work and they often expect the same level of dedication and work ethics from the next generations. They are said to prefer face to face communication, are interactive team players and attain personal fulfilment from work. Baby Boomers are often branded workaholics leaving little to no work-life balance which has inevitably led to a breakdown in family values which has influenced the next generation. They are said to be loyal to their organisations, enjoy the notion of lifetime employment and prefer to be valued or needed as opposed to rewarded with recognition or money. An article by Emma Simon in the Daily Telegraph describes them as the 'post war generation' who have enjoyed an "unbroken run of good-luck".

== Generation X ==
Generation X is the generation born after the Western post–World War II baby boom, between approximately 1965 and 1980. The term was noted by photographer Robert Capa in the early 1950s. Of the generation, Capa said "We named this unknown generation, The Generation X, and even in our first enthusiasm we realised that we had something far bigger than our talents and pockets could cope with."

This generation of workers were brought up in the shadow of the influential Boomer generation and as a result, are independent, resilient and adaptable. In contrast to the Baby Boomers who live to work, this generation works to live and carry with them a level of cynicism. They prefer freedom to manage their work and tasks their own way. They consider a job to be just that, and are comfortable questioning authority.

Coming out of and during the recession, there has been a significant shift in Gen X moving to management roles. Perceptions of Gen X managers are high according to an online survey published by Ernst & Young. Out of 200 people, 57% of respondents believed that Gen X displayed each of the survey’s positive characteristics and were thought to be best at managing through difficult times.

== Millennials (Generation Y) ==
Millennials, or Generation Y, were born approximately between 1981 and 1997. They have been described in a report published by United Nations Joint Staff Pension Fund as the next big generation after the Baby Boomers. They were raised during the good time or empowerment years and are the first generation to grow up with computers and the internet. In her book, The Shift: The future of work is already here, Grattan states that this generation admire these new platforms they use even though they grew up with them.

Millennials are hard working, resourceful, and imaginative. They readily take on and solve new problems and technologies with which they were previously unfamiliar with, and are known for their ability to fix problems. They were the first generation to grow up with computers and the internet, and are considered the first true "technology natives". They are also, on average, more educated than previous generations, with around 47% having a post-secondary degree as of 2013. They are currently the backbone of the American workforce, making up the largest portion at 38%, especially as Gen X and boomers continue to age out of the workforce. 73 percent of millennials reporting working more than 40 hours a week and nearly a quarter work more than 50 hours a week.

A report published by Adecco on workplace revolution outlined Gen Y’s work ethics and behaviours. According to the report, they enjoy a work life balance, akin to Gen X, and prefer to work with bright and creative people. They are participative as opposed to directive, enjoy multi-tasking and are goal oriented. They are also considered the most educated and self-aware generation in employment. According to an Ernst & Young report on the rise of young managers in the workplace, this generation were not considered to be team players and have an attitude of entitlement. This was also noted by Jean Twenge in her book Generation me. In terms of management, they are considered inclusive leaders and enjoy diversification and input when making decisions.

== Generation Z ==
The future generation of workers, according to Amy Glass, are referred to as Generation Z. Generation Z are those born approximately between 1998 and 2012 and are even more reliant on new technology and in particular communication technologies.

'The Next Generation of Workers' written by Lily Guthrie of The Ken Blanchard Companies, Office of the Future, highlights the importance of awareness and understanding of the attitudes of the intergenerational workforce. Companies will need to be collaborative, innovative and agile in their operations and management. There are many reports on the management of a cohort of generations in the workplace, including one from the psychology foundation of Canada which provides effective strategies, training, and education that they believe will bridge the differences between the generations.

== See also ==
- Aging in the American workforce
