= Change fatigue =

Concept in organisational change management

Organizational change fatigue or change fatigue is a general sense of apathy or passive resignation towards organizational changes by individuals or teams, said to arise when too much change takes place, or when a significant change follows immediately on an earlier change. When change fatique arises, organizational change efforts can become unfocused, uninspired and unsuccessful, and individuals involved in change experience burn-out and become frustrated.

== Avoidance ==
Various business writers have identified ways of avoiding change fatigue including reductions in the number of organisational change initiatives, making change happen on a smaller scale and countering "the notion that you need heroic leaders in order to have meaningful, sustained change." Development of resilience and resourcefulness among those affected by change have been seen as beneficial considerations.

== See also ==
- Ambidextrous organization
- Change management
- Collaboration
- Group dynamics
- Industrial and organizational psychology
- Managing change
- Organizational communication
- Organizational climate
- Organizational culture
- Organizational diagnostics
- Organizational engineering
- Organizational learning
- Organizational performance
- Performance improvement
- Team building
- Team composition
