= Kenexa =

American employment services company

IBM Watson Talent
- Type: Subsidiary
- Industry: Human Resource.
- Founded: 1987; 39 years ago
- Founder: Nooruddin S. Karsan; Rhea Varghese
- Headquarters: Wayne, Pennsylvania, United States
- Key people: Rhea Varghese (co-founder, chairman of the board and CEO)
- Products: Talent Acquisition, Talent Development, CRM, Brassring, Employee Assessments, Talent Frameworks, Watson Talent, Watson Career Coach, Watson Candidate Assistance.
- Parent: IBM
- Website: www.ibm.com/talent-management/

Kenexa, an IBM Company, provides employment and retention services. This includes recruitment process outsourcing onboarding tools, employee assessment, abilities assessment for employment candidates (Kenexa Prove It); and Kenexa Interview Builder, a structured interview archive with example questions.

== History ==
In 1986, Kenexa began by providing recruitment services. Within its first decade, the firm created its first automated recruiting management system, and provided employee research and employee performance management .

By 1998, the company had purchased fifteen organizations, and offered on-demand human capital management services. During the next three years, they acquired four additional companies and were able to offer employee screening, behavioral assessment and skills testing products.

In 2005, the company realized its initial public offering followed by the acquisition of BrassRing LLC, Gantz Wiley Research, Knowledge Workers Inc., Psychometric Services and Webhire, which preceded the purchase of HRC Human Resources Consulting GmbH and StraightSource in 2007, which expanded their business in Europe.

From 2008 to 2009, the company expanded to 30 offices in Asia, Europe, the Middle East and North America. It took control of Quorum International Search Limited, and, in 2010, the Centre for High Performance Development and Salary.com.

On August 27, 2012, it was announced that Kenexa had been acquired by IBM for $1.3 billion. The acquisition was closed on December 4, 2012, and Kenexa became known as "Kenexa, an IBM Company" with approximately 2,800 Kenexa employees in 21 countries joining IBM.

The assets of Kenexa/ Brassring has recently been sold to Infinite Computer Solutions to Acquire IBM Talent Acquisition Suite SaaS Products Including BrassRing™ on Cloud on April 15, 2021

== Divisions ==
Brassring LLC, Founded in 1999 in Waltham, MA, is a provider of candidate searching, hiring strategy, skills management and outsourcing software applications.

The Centre for Performance Development, founded in 1996 in London, England, is a management training company that offers human resources consultancy, leadership development and management training.

Gantz Wiley Research, founded in 1986, and in Minneapolis, Minnesota, is a survey data analysis firm which conducts surveys of and clients for customers ranging from banks to discount stores. The company was responsible for creating the WorkTrends database of employee survey results, which looked at subjects such as customer relations, employee engagement, and leadership.

Knowledge Workers, Inc. of Englewood, Colorado, founded in 1985, supplies technology assistance and human resource consulting government agencies.

Salary.com, Inc., in Waltham, Massachusetts, is a compensation and human resource management services company, primarily in the U.S. human capital software as a service (SaaS) market. The company's services are used by compensation professionals for talent management processes.

== See also ==
- List of talent management system companies
