= Who Moved My Cheese? =

Motivational business fable written by Spencer Johnson

- Author: Spencer Johnson
- Language: English
- Genre: Self-help / motivational, Motivational, Business fable, Psychology, Leadership, Parable
- Publisher: Putnam Adult
- Publication date: September 7, 1998
- Publication place: United States
- Media type: Print (Paperback)
- Pages: 94 pp.
- ISBN: 0-399-14446-3
- OCLC: 38752984
- Dewey Decimal: 155.2/4
- LC Class: BF637.C4 J64 1998

Who Moved My Cheese? An Amazing Way to Deal with Change in Your Work and in Your Life is a 1998 motivational business fable by Spencer Johnson about change in work and life. The book is written as a parable about two mice and two "Littlepeople" during their hunt for cheese. A New York Times business bestseller upon release, Who Moved My Cheese? remained on the list for almost five years and spent over 200 weeks on Publishers Weekly's hardcover nonfiction list. As of 2018, it has sold almost 30 million copies worldwide in 37 languages and remains one of the best-selling business books. In November 2018, it was followed by a sequel called Out of the Maze.

== Summary ==
Several high school classmates meet after a class reunion and discuss the challenge of handling the changes in their lives. Michael, a business manager, says that he was afraid of change until he heard an allegorical story, which he proceeds to tell.

In the story, two mice and two "littlepeople" – people the size of mice – live in a maze. The mice, named Sniff and Scurry, are simpleminded and instinctive; they run the same path every day, eating cheese when they find it, but are always ready to move on. The littlepeople, Hem and Haw, search for a special kind of Cheese that makes them happy and fulfilled by keeping track of where they have found it before. All four discover a spot where their favorite cheese is regularly available, called Cheese Station C. The mice continue to run the entire maze each day while the littlepeople stop exploring and settle at Cheese Station C.

One day the supply at Cheese Station C is exhausted. The mice accept that there is no more cheese and continue their running path. The littlepeople sit at the station confused and upset. Hem protests that there ought to be Cheese, and Haw wonders where the mice have gone. Meanwhile, the mice find a new supply of cheese at Cheese Station N. The littlepeople remain at Cheese Station C for several days, growing frustrated and hungry. Eventually Haw accepts that running the maze is the only way he will ever have Cheese again, faces his fear of moving on, and leaves Hem behind.

Haw finds crumbs of Cheese scattered around the maze and some other Cheese Stations that are already depleted. He returns to Cheese Station C and tells Hem there is other Cheese, but Hem refuses to budge. Haw continues exploring, writing observations about his journey on the walls of the maze, until he arrives at Cheese Station N which is stocked with all kinds of Cheese.

Haw reflects on the lessons he has learned and hopes that Hem will finally let go of his doubts. On the wall of Cheese Station N, he writes several lessons that change is inevitable and keeping up with it is the only way to continue having Cheese. Cautious from past experience, Haw inspects Cheese Station N daily and explores different parts of the maze regularly to prevent complacency. Hearing movement in the maze one day, Haw realizes someone is approaching the station and hopes it is his friend Hem.

After Michael finishes the story, the classmates agree to meet again before dinner and discuss it. They tell different stories of encountering change and how they, or someone else, failed to respond to it. All of them agree that the Cheese story is a useful parable to follow and tell their friends.

== Who Moved My Cheese Inc. ==
In 1999, Who Moved My Cheese Inc was founded to handle the Who Moved My Cheese? book order demands from businesses. In 2005, the company was reorganized as Spencer Johnson Partners with the idea of bringing in partners and additional content from Dr. Spencer Johnson, the author. Spencer Johnson Partners focused on creating additional programs and services that would continue to help clients navigate change, including Gaining Change Skills. In 2009, the company was purchased and renamed Red Tree leadership.

== Reception ==
In the corporate environment, management has been known to distribute this book to employees during times of "structural reorganization", or during cost-cutting measures, in an attempt to portray unfavorable or unfair changes in an optimistic or opportunistic way. This has been characterized by Barbara Ehrenreich in her book Bright-sided: How the Relentless Promotion of Positive Thinking Has Undermined America as an attempt by organizational management to make employees quickly and unconditionally assimilate management ideals, even if they may prove detrimental to them professionally. Ehrenreich called the book "the classic of downsizing propaganda" and summarizes its message as "the dangerous human tendencies to 'overanalyze' and complain must be overcome for a more rodentlike approach to life. When you lose a job, just shut up and scamper along to the next one."

Liberal journalist Thomas Frank situated the book in a broader genre of management-serving literature that portrays the imbalance of power between employees and managers as an inevitable force of "change" that employees must not question, and should even accept happily. Change comes, mysteriously, from outside the maze while the possibility of the inhabitants effecting change on their terms is rendered unthinkable.

Dilbert cartoonist Scott Adams said that patronizing parables are one of the top things he received complaints about by email. Adams' retort to the message in the parable is that it is a "patronizing message for the proletariat to acquiesce".

Academic commentary has also treated the book as a business fable about change. Francesco Pierini describes the book as a business fable that seeks to persuade readers to adopt new points of view regarding change, while Hriseekesh Upadhyay calls it a parable of personal development centred on understanding and adapting to change.

== Parodies ==
There are multiple parody works called Who Cut the Cheese?.

- Andy Borowitz published a parody, Who Moved My Soap?: The CEO's Guide to Surviving Prison, Simon & Schuster, c2003.
- Darrel Bristow-Bovey published a parody, I Moved Your Cheese, Penguin Random House South Africa, Apr 13, 2012.
- Comedian/TV host/motivational speaker Ross Shafer wrote Nobody Moved Your Cheese!.

== See also ==
- Rat race
