= Organization development =

Study and implementation of techniques that affect organizational change

Organizational development (OD) is the study and implementation of practices, systems, and techniques that affect organizational change, the goal of which is to modify the performance and/or culture of a group or organization. Organizational changes are typically initiated by the group's stakeholders. OD emerged from human relations studies in the 1930s, during which psychologists realized that organizational structures and processes influence worker behavior and motivation. Organizational development is a systematic process to increase individual and organizational effectiveness by applying behavioral science principles and practices.

Organizational Development allows businesses to construct and maintain a brand new preferred state for the whole agency. Key concepts of OD theory include: organizational climate (the mood or unique "personality" of an organization, which includes attitudes and beliefs that influence members' collective behavior), organizational culture (the deeply-seated norms, values, and behaviors that members share) and organizational strategies (how an organization identifies problems, plans action, negotiates change and evaluates progress). A key aspect of OD is to review organizational identity.

== Overview ==
Organization development as a practice involves an ongoing, systematic process of implementing effective organizational change. OD is both a field of applied science focused on understanding and managing organizational change and a field of scientific study and inquiry. It is interdisciplinary in nature and draws on sociology, psychology, particularly industrial and organizational psychology, and theories of motivation, learning, and personality. Although behavioral science has provided the basic foundation for the study and practice of OD, new and emerging fields of study have made their presence felt. Experts in systems thinking, in organizational learning, in the structure of intuition in decision-making, and in coaching (to name a few) whose perspective is not steeped in just the behavioral sciences, but in a much more multi-disciplinary and inter-disciplinary approach, have emerged as OD catalysts or tools.

=== History ===
Kurt Lewin (1898–1947) is the founding father of OD, although he died before the concept became mainstream in the mid-1950s. From Lewin came the ideas of group dynamics and action research which underpin the basic OD process as well as providing its collaborative consultant/client ethos. Institutionally, Lewin founded the "Research Center for Group Dynamics" (RCGD) at MIT, which moved to Michigan after his death. RCGD colleagues were among those who founded the National Training Laboratories (NTL), from which the T-groups and group-based OD emerged.

Kurt Lewin played a key role in the evolution of organization development as it is known today. As early as World War II (1939-1945), Lewin experimented with a collaborative change-process (involving himself as a consultant and a client group) based on a three-step process of planning, taking action, and measuring results. This was the forerunner of action research, an important element of OD, which will be discussed later. Lewin also initiated a learning method known as laboratory training, or T-groups. After Lewin's death in 1947, his close associates helped to develop survey-research methods at the University of Michigan. These procedures became important parts of OD as developments in this field continued at the National Training Laboratories and in growing numbers of universities and private consulting-firms across the US. Leading universities offering doctoral-level degrees in OD include Benedictine University and the Fielding Graduate University.

Douglas and Richard Beckhard, while "consulting together at General Mills in the 1950s [...] coined the term organization development (OD) to describe an innovative bottom-up change effort that fit no traditional consulting categories" (Weisbord, 1987, p. 112).

The failure of off-site laboratory training to live up to its early promise was one of the important forces stimulating the development of OD. Laboratory training is learning from a person's "here and now" experience as a member of an ongoing training group. Such groups usually meet without a specific agenda. Their purpose is for the members to learn about themselves from their spontaneous "here and now" responses to an ambiguous situation. Problems of leadership, structure, status, communication, and self-serving behavior typically arise in such a group. The members have an opportunity to learn something about themselves and to practice such skills as listening, observing others, and functioning as effective group members. Herbert A. Shepard conducted the first large-scale experiments in Organization Development in the late fifties. He also founded the first doctoral program in organizational behavior at Case Western State University, and his colleague, Robert Blake, was also influential in making the term "organizational development" a more widely recognized field of psychological research.

As formerly practiced (and occasionally still practiced for special purposes), laboratory training was conducted in "stranger groups"—groups composed of individuals from different organizations, situations, and backgrounds. A major difficulty developed, however, in transferring knowledge gained from these "stranger labs" to the actual situation "back home". This required a transfer between two different cultures, the relatively safe and protected environment of the T-group (or training group), and the give-and-take of the organizational environment with its traditional values. This led the early pioneers in this type of learning to begin to apply it to "family groups"—that is, groups located within an organization. From this shift in the locale of the training site and the realization that culture was an important factor in influencing group members (along with some other developments in the behavioral sciences) emerged the concept of organization development.

=== Core values ===
Underlying Organization Development are humanistic values. Margulies and Raia (1972) articulated the humanistic values of OD as follows:

1. Providing opportunities for people to function as human beings rather than as resources in the productive process
2. Providing opportunities for each organization member, as well as for the organization itself, to develop to their full potential
3. Seeking to increase the effectiveness of the organization in terms of all of its goals
4. Attempting to create an environment in which it is possible to find exciting and challenging work
5. Providing opportunities for people in organizations to influence the way in which they relate to work, the organization, and the environment
6. Treating each human being as a person with a complex set of needs, all of which are important to their work and their life

This is a separate concept from change efforts known as:

1. Operation management
2. Training and development
3. Technological innovations....etc.

==== Objectives ====
The objectives of OD are:

1. to increase the level of inter-personal trust among employees
2. to increase employees' level of satisfaction and commitment
3. to confront problems instead of neglecting them
4. to effectively manage conflict
5. to increase cooperation and collaboration among employees
6. to increase organizational problem-solving
7. to put in place processes that will help improve the ongoing operation of an organization on a continuous basis

As objectives of organizational development are framed keeping in view specific situations, they vary from one situation to another. In other words, these programs are tailored to meet the requirements of a particular situation. But broadly speaking, all organizational development programs try to achieve the following objectives:

1. making individuals in the organization aware of the vision of the organization. Organizational development helps in making employees align with the vision of the organization
2. encouraging employees to solve problems instead of avoiding them
3. strengthening inter-personal trust, cooperation, and communication for the successful achievement of organizational goals
4. encouraging every individual to participate in the process of planning, thus making them feel responsible for the implementation of the plan
5. creating a work atmosphere in which employees are encouraged to work and participate enthusiastically
6. replacing formal lines of authority with personal knowledge and skill
7. preparing members to align with changes and to break stereotypes
8. creating an environment of trust so that employees willingly accept change

According to organizational-development thinking, organization development provides managers with a vehicle for introducing change systematically by applying a broad selection of management techniques. This, in turn, leads to greater personal, group, and organizational effectiveness.

=== Change agent ===
A change agent in the sense used here is not a technical expert skilled in such functional areas as accounting, production, or finance. The change agent is a behavioral scientist who knows how to get people in an organization involved in solving their own problems. A change agent's main strength is a comprehensive knowledge of human behavior, supported by a number of intervention techniques (to be discussed later). The change agent can be either external or internal to the organization. An internal change agent is usually a staff person who has expertise in the behavioral sciences and in the intervention technology of OD. Beckhard reports several cases in which line people have been trained in OD and have returned to their organizations to engage in successful change-assignments.

Researchers at the University of Oxford found that leaders can be effective change-agents within their own organizations if they are strongly committed to "knowledge leadership" targeted towards organizational development. In their three-year study of UK healthcare organizations, the researchers identified three different mechanisms through which knowledge leaders actively "transposed", "appropriated" or "contended" change concepts, effectively translating and embedding these in organizational practice.

The change agent may be a staff or line member of the organization who is schooled in OD theory and technique. In such a case, the "contractual relationship" is an in-house agreement that should probably be explicit with respect to all of the conditions involved except the fee.

=== Sponsoring organization ===
The initiative for OD programs often comes from an organization that has a problem or anticipates facing a problem. This means that top management or someone authorized by top management is aware that a problem exists and has decided to seek help in solving it. There is a direct analogy here to the practice of psychotherapy: The client or patient must actively seek help in finding a solution to his problems. This indicates a willingness on the part of the client organization to accept help and assures the organization that management is actively concerned.

=== Applied behavioral science ===
One of the outstanding characteristics of OD that distinguishes it from most other improvement programs is that it is based on a "helping relationship". Some believe that the change agent is a physician to the organization's ills; that s/he does not examine the "patient", make a diagnosis, and write a prescription. Nor does s/he try to teach organizational members a new inventory of knowledge which they then transfer to the job situation. Using theory and methods drawn from such behavioral sciences as industrial/organizational psychology, industrial sociology, communication, cultural anthropology, administrative theory, organizational behavior, economics, and political science, the change agent's main function is to help the organization define and solve its own problems. The basic method used is known as action research. This approach, which is described in detail later, consists of a preliminary diagnosis, collecting data, feedback of the data to the client, data exploration by the client group, action planning based on the data, and taking action.

=== The holistic and futuristic view of organization ===
OD deals with a total system—the organization as a whole, including its relevant environment—or with a subsystem or systems—departments or workgroups—in the context of the total system. Parts of systems—for example, individuals, cliques, structures, norms, values, and products—are not considered in isolation; the principle of interdependency—that change in one part of a system affects the other parts—is fully recognized. Thus OD interventions focus on the total cultures and cultural processes of organizations. The focus is also on groups, since the relevant behavior of individuals in organizations and groups is generally a product of the influences of groups rather than of personalities.

== Improved organizational performance ==
The objective of OD is to improve the organization's capacity to handle its internal and external functioning and relationships. This includes improved interpersonal and group processes, more effective communication, and enhanced ability to cope with organizational problems of all kinds. It also involves more effective decision processes, more appropriate leadership styles, improved skill in dealing with destructive conflict, as well as developing improved levels of trust and cooperation among organizational members. These objectives stem from a value system based on an optimistic view of the nature of man—that man in a supportive environment is capable of achieving higher levels of development and accomplishment. Essential to organization development and effectiveness is the scientific method—inquiry, a rigorous search for causes, experimental testing of hypotheses, and review of results.

Self-managing workgroups allow the members of a work team to manage, control, and monitor all facets of their work, from recruiting, hiring, and new employees to deciding when to take rest breaks. An early analysis of the first-self-managing work groups yielded the following behavioral characteristics (Hackman, 1986):

- Employees assume personal responsibility and accountability for the outcomes of their work.
- Employees monitor their own performance and seek feedback on how well they are accomplishing their goals.
- Employees manage their performance and take corrective action when necessary to improve their and the performance of other group members.
- Employees seek guidance, assistance, and resources from the organization when they do not have what they need to do the job.
- Employees help members of their workgroup and employees in other groups to improve job performance and raise productivity for the organization as a whole.

=== Organizational self-renewal ===
The ultimate aim of OD practitioners is to "work themselves out of a job" by leaving the client organization with a set of tools, behaviors, attitudes, and an action plan with which to monitor its own state of health and to take corrective steps toward its own renewal and development. This is consistent with the systems concept of feedback as a regulatory and corrective mechanism. To this end, OD scholars and practitioners use tools such as simulations with their clients, to be used in workshops and classroom settings. One example of a self-renewal simulation, authored by researchers from Cornell University and Indiana University, can be found here (see citation).

The study of organizational effectiveness and improving organizational performance has developed alongside the study of leadership development with a greater focus on leadership development programs that focus on the development of the individual. See .Emotional intelligence in relation to leadership development.

== Understanding organizations ==
Weisbord presents a six-box model for understanding organizations:

1. Purposes: The organization members are clear about the organization's mission and purpose and goal agreements, whether people support the organization's purpose.
2. Structure: How is the organization's work divided up? The question is whether there is an adequate fit between the purpose and the internal structure.
3. Relationship: Between individuals, between units or departments that perform different tasks, and between the people and requirements of their jobs.
4. Rewards: The consultant should diagnose the similarities between what the organization formally rewarded or punished members for.
5. Leadership: Is to watch for blips among the other boxes and maintain balance among them.
6. Helpful mechanism: What must the organization attend to in order to survive and thrive—procedures such as planning, control, budgeting, and other information systems.

=== Modern development ===
In recent years, serious questioning has emerged about the relevance of OD to managing change in modern organizations. The need for "reinventing" the field has become a topic that even some of its "founding fathers" are discussing critically.

With this call for reinvention and change, scholars have begun to examine organizational development from an emotion-based standpoint. For example, deKlerk (2007) writes about how emotional trauma can negatively affect performance. Due to downsizing, outsourcing, mergers, restructuring, continual changes, invasions of privacy, harassment, and abuses of power, many employees experience the emotions of aggression, anxiety, apprehension, cynicism, and fear, which can lead to performance decreases. de Klerk (2007) suggests that in order to heal the trauma and increase performance, O.D. practitioners must acknowledge the existence of the trauma, provide a safe place for employees to discuss their feelings, symbolize the trauma and put it into perspective, and then allow for and deal with the emotional responses. One method of achieving this is by having employees draw pictures of what they feel about the situation, and then having them explain their drawings with each other. Drawing pictures is beneficial because it allows employees to express emotions they normally would not be able to put into words. Also, drawings often prompt active participation in the activity, as everyone is required to draw a picture and then discuss its meaning...

The use of new technologies combined with globalization has also shifted the field of organizational development. Roland Sullivan (2005) defined Organization Development with participants at the 1st Organization Development Conference for Asia in Dubai-2005 as "Organization Development is a transformative leap to a desired vision where strategies and systems align, in the light of local culture with an innovative and authentic leadership style using the support of high tech tools. Bob Aubrey (2015) introduced Key Development Indicators to help organizations go beyond performance and align strategy, organizations, and individuals and argued that fundamental challenges such as robotics, artificial intelligence, and genetics prefigure a regeneration of the field.

== Action research ==
Wendell L French and Cecil Bell defined organization development (OD) at one point as "organization improvement through action research". If one idea can be said to summarize OD's underlying philosophy, it would be action research as it was conceptualized by Kurt Lewin and later elaborated and expanded on by other behavioral scientists. Concerned with social change and, more particularly, with effective, permanent social change, Lewin believed that the motivation to change was strongly related to action: If people are active in decisions affecting them, they are more likely to adopt new ways. "Rational social management", he said, "proceeds in a spiral of steps, each of which is composed of a circle of planning, action, and fact-finding about the result of action".

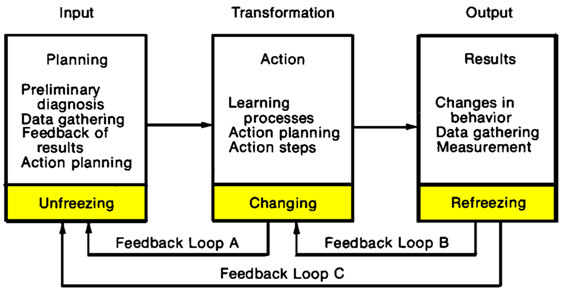
Figure 1: Systems Model of Action-Research Process

Lewin's description of the process of change involves three steps:

"Unfreezing": Faced with a dilemma or disconfirmation, the individual or group becomes aware of a need to change.

"Changing": The situation is diagnosed and new models of behavior are explored and tested.

"Refreezing": Application of new behavior is evaluated, and if reinforced, adopted.

Figure 1 summarizes the steps and processes involved in planned change through action research. Action research is depicted as a cyclical process of change. The cycle begins with a series of planning actions initiated by the client and the change agent working together. The principal elements of this stage include a preliminary diagnosis, data gathering, feedback of results, and joint action planning. In the language of systems theory, this is the input phase, in which the client system becomes aware of problems as yet unidentified, realizes it may need outside help to effect changes, and shares with the consultant the process of problem diagnosis.

The second stage of action research is the action, or transformation, phase. This stage includes actions relating to learning processes (perhaps in the form of role analysis) and to planning and executing behavioral changes in the client organization. As shown in Figure 1, feedback at this stage would move via Feedback Loop A and would have the effect of altering previous planning to bring the learning activities of the client system into better alignment with change objectives. Included in this stage is action-planning activity carried out jointly by the consultant and members of the client system. Following the workshop or learning sessions, these action steps are carried out on the job as part of the transformation stage.

The third stage of action research is the output, or results, phase. This stage includes actual changes in behavior (if any) resulting from corrective action steps taken following the second stage. Data are again gathered from the client system so that progress can be determined and necessary adjustments in learning activities can be made. Minor adjustments of this nature can be made in learning activities via Feedback Loop B (see Figure 1). Major adjustments and reevaluations would return the OD project to the first, or planning, a stage for basic changes in the program. The action-research model shown in Figure 1 closely follows Lewin's repetitive cycle of planning, action, and measuring results. It also illustrates other aspects of Lewin's general model of change. As indicated in the diagram, the planning stage is a period of unfreezing, or problem awareness. The action stage is a period of change, that is, trying out new forms of behavior in an effort to understand and cope with the system's problems. (There is inevitable overlap between the stages since the boundaries are not clear-cut and cannot be in a continuous process). The results stage is a period of refreezing, in which new behaviors are tried out on the job and, if successful and reinforcing, become a part of the system's repertoire of problem-solving behavior.

Action research is problem-centered, client-centered, and action-oriented. It involves the client system in a diagnostic, active-learning, problem-finding, and problem-solving process. Data are not simply returned in the form of a written report but instead are fed back in open joint sessions, and the client and the change agent collaborate in identifying and ranking specific problems, in devising methods for finding their real causes, and in developing plans for coping with them realistically and practically. Scientific method in the form of data gathering, forming hypotheses, testing hypotheses, and measuring results, although not pursued as rigorously as in the laboratory, is nevertheless an integral part of the process. Action research also sets in motion a long-range, cyclical, self-correcting mechanism for maintaining and enhancing the effectiveness of the client's system by leaving the system with practical and useful tools for self-analysis and self-renewal.

== Interventions ==
"Interventions" are principal learning processes in the "action" stage (see Figure 1) of organization development. Interventions are structured activities used individually or in combination by the members of a client system to improve their social or task performance. They may be introduced by a change agent as part of an improvement program, or they may be used by the client following a program to check on the state of the organization's health or to effect necessary changes in its own behavior. "Structured activities" mean such diverse procedures as experiential exercises, questionnaires, attitude surveys, interviews, relevant group discussions, and even lunchtime meetings between the change agent and a member of the client organization. Every action that influences an organization's improvement program in a change agent-client system relationship can be said to be an intervention. The change agent may opt for setting up an episodic intervention organization within the client organization as part of the OD action plan.

There are many possible intervention strategies from which to choose. Several assumptions about the nature and functioning of organizations are made in the choice of a particular strategy. Beckhard lists six such assumptions:

1. The basic building blocks of an organization are groups (teams). Therefore, the basic units of change are groups, not individuals.
2. An always relevant change goal is the reduction of inappropriate competition between parts of the organization and the development of a more collaborative condition.
3. Decision making in a healthy organization is located where the information sources are, rather than in a particular role or level of hierarchy.
4. Organizations, subunits of organizations, and individuals continuously manage their affairs against goals. Controls are interim measurements, not the basis of managerial strategy.
5. One goal of a healthy organization is to develop generally open communication, mutual trust, and confidence between and across levels.
6. People support what they help create. People affected by a change must be allowed active participation and a sense of ownership in the planning and conduct of the change.

Interventions range from those designed to improve the effectiveness of individuals through those designed to deal with teams and groups, intergroup relations, and the total organization. There are interventions that focus on task issues (what people do), and those that focus on process issues (how people go about doing it). Finally, interventions may be roughly classified according to which change mechanism they tend to emphasize: for example, feedback, awareness of changing cultural norms, interaction and communication, conflict, and education through either new knowledge or skill practice.

One of the most difficult tasks confronting the change agent is to help create in the client system a safe climate for learning and change. In a favorable climate, human learning builds on itself and continues indefinitely during man's lifetime. Out of new behavior, new dilemmas and problems emerge as the spiral continues upward to new levels. In an unfavorable climate, in contrast, learning is far less certain, and in an atmosphere of psychological threat, it often stops altogether. Unfreezing old ways can be inhibited in organizations because the climate makes employees feel that it is inappropriate to reveal true feelings, even though such revelations could be constructive. In an inhibited atmosphere, therefore, necessary feedback is not available. Also, trying out new ways may be viewed as risky because it violates established norms. Such an organization may also be constrained because of the law of systems: If one part changes, other parts will become involved. Hence, it is easier to maintain the status quo. Hierarchical authority, specialization, span of control, and other characteristics of formal systems also discourage experimentation.

The change agent is to be prepared for having to address all of the above hazards and obstacles. Some of the things which will help the change agent are:

1. A real need in the client system to change
2. Genuine support from management
3. Setting a personal example: listening, supporting behavior
4. A sound background in the behavioral sciences
5. A working knowledge of systems theory
6. A belief in man as a rational, self-educating being fully capable of learning better ways to do things.

A few examples of interventions include team building, coaching, Large Group Interventions, mentoring, performance appraisal, downsizing, TQM, and leadership development.

== See also ==
- Employee research
- Experimental organisational development
- Facilitation
- Georges Romme (involved in designing OD education)
- Human relations movement
- Large-group capacitation
- Organizational communication
- Organizational diagnostics
- Organizational engineering
- Performance improvement
- Social development theory
