= The Traveler's Gift =

- Front Cover
- Author: Andy Andrews
- Language: English
- Publisher: Thomas Nelson
- Publication date: November 5, 2002
- Media type: Hardcover
- Pages: 211
- ISBN: 978-0-7852-6428-6

The Traveler's Gift - Seven Decisions That Determine Personal Success is a book released in 2002 by author Andy Andrews. The book was featured in the book selection of ABC's Good Morning America. The Traveler's Gift weaves a business fable about a man who loses his job and money, but finds his way after he is magically transported into seven key points in history. At each location, the man meets historical figures such as Abraham Lincoln, Anne Frank, King Solomon, Harry Truman and Christopher Columbus. The book has also been adapted as a DVD.
