= Herbert A. Shepard =

Herbert Allen Shepard (1919–1985) was a Canadian-born American organization behaviorist and economist who made a significant contribution to Organization Development He held faculty posts at several universities including M.I.T., where he received his doctorate in Industrial Economics. He founded and directed the first doctoral program in Organization Development at Case Western Reserve; developed a residency in administrative psychiatry at Yale University School of Medicine, and was also President of The Gestalt Institute of Cleveland and The Professional Development Institute PDI Inc..

Shepard conducted the first large-scale experiments in Organization Development, while at Esso in the late fifties, and served as principal consultant to TRW Systems in the applications of behavioral science to organizations and teams. He has published widely and was chairman of the Douglas Memorial Award Committee of the Journal of Applied Behavioral Science. His research advanced our understanding of human behavior and social systems from dyads (doctor-patient or consultant-client) to organizations (synergy, alternative dispute resolution, structure, building consensus and caring about the powerless). It opened the way for further developments in the psychology of teams, leadership and interpersonal compatibility; cognitive behavior therapy, social cognitive theory (educational psychology); choice theory;"Principled Negotiation". 26 September 2022., positive psychology and organization development.

In management consulting, Shepard's clients included Bell-Northern Research, Syncrude, Esso (U.S., Canada, Japan), TRW, Connecticut General Life Insurance Company, Union Carbide, USAID and most of the departments of the federal governments of the US and Canada. He was instrumental in orchestrating the graceful termination of "Cold Lake 1.0" Esso's (Imperial Oil Canada) first oil-sand mega-project in Alberta Canada.
