= Ken Blanchard =

American motivational speaker and author

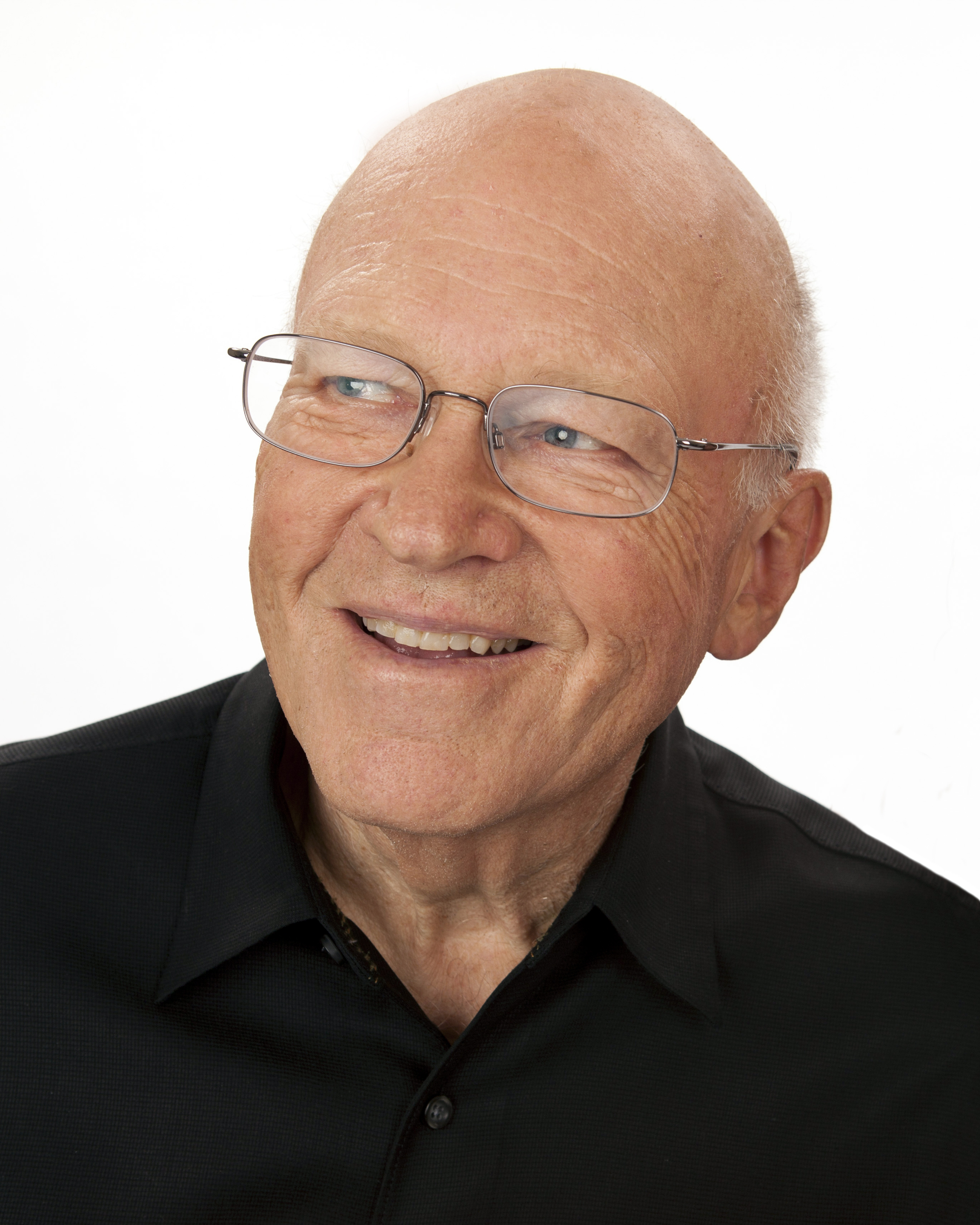
- Ken Blanchard
- Born: May 6, 1939 (age 87); Orange, New Jersey, U.S.
- Education: Cornell University, 1961; Colgate University, 1963
- Occupations: Author; motivational speaker; consultant; management expert
- Notable work: The One Minute Manager, 1982; Leadership and the One Minute Manager, 1985; Raving Fans, 1993; Gung Ho!, Legendary Service: The Key is to Care, 1996; The Secret: What Great Leaders Know and Do, 2004; Refire! Don't Retire, 2015
- Spouse: Marjorie Blanchard

Kenneth Hartley Blanchard (born May 6, 1939) is an American author, business consultant and motivational speaker who has written more than 70 books, most of which were co-authored. His most successful book, The One Minute Manager, has sold more than 15 million copies and been translated into many languages. He is the co-creator with Paul Hersey of Situational Leadership, a theory they developed while working on the textbook Management of Organizational Behavior.

Blanchard is the chief spiritual officer of Blanchard, an international management training and consulting firm which he and his wife, Marjorie Blanchard, co-founded in 1979 in San Diego, California.

== Education ==
Blanchard attended New Rochelle High School in New Rochelle, New York and graduated in 1957. He completed a BA degree in government and philosophy at Cornell University in 1961, an MA degree in sociology and counseling at Colgate University in 1963 and received a PhD degree in education administration and leadership at Cornell University in 1967.

Blanchard is a Cornell University trustee emeritus and visiting professor at the Cornell University School of Hotel Administration. He and his wife were named Cornell Entrepreneurs of the Year in 1991.

== Books ==
Blanchard has written over 70 books. Some are:

- The One Minute Manager (co-author Spencer Johnson, 1982) combines Blanchard's management theory with the parable writing style Johnson established in his Value Tales for children in the 1970s. In 2001, an article in The Wall Street Journal said that The One Minute Manager bore a resemblance to an article written by Blanchard's former colleague, Arthur Elliott Carlisle. In 2015 the book was revised and released as The New One Minute Manager.
- Leadership and the One Minute Manager: Increasing Effectiveness Through Situational Leadership® (1985) (in which he coined the term seagull manager)
- Raving Fans: A Revolutionary Approach to Customer Service (1993)
- Gung Ho! Turn On the People in Any Organization (1997)
- Whale Done! The Power of Positive Relationships (2002)
- The Secret: What Great Leaders Know and Do (2004)
- Leading at a Higher Level: Blanchard on Leadership and Creating High Performing Organizations (2006).

== See also ==
- Business fable
- Situational leadership theory
- Spencer Johnson

== Bibliography ==
- Servant Leadership in Action: How You Can Achieve Great Relationships and Results (edited by Ken Blanchard and Renee Broadwell) (2018), Berrett-Koehler Publishers; ISBN 9781523093960.
- One Minute Mentoring: How to Find and Work With a Mentor--and Why You'll Benefit from Being One (with Claire Diaz-Ortiz, 2017), William Morrow; ISBN 978-0062429308ISBN 9781626566668ISBN 9781626568518.
- Collaboration Begins with You: Be a Silo Buster (with Jane Ripley and Eunice Parisi-Carew, 2015), Berrett-Koehler Publishers; ISBN 9781626566170.
- Refire! Don't Retire: Make the Rest of Your Life the Best of Your Life (with Morton Shaevitz, 2015), Berrett-Koehler Publishers; ISBN 9781626563339.
- The Secret: What Great Leaders Know and Do, 3rd Edition (with Mark Miller, 2014), Berrett-Koehler Publishers; ISBN 9781626561984.
- Fit at Last: Look and Feel Better Once and for All (with Tim Kearin, 2014), Berrett-Koehler Publishers; ISBN 9781626560604ISBN 9781626562431.
- Great Leaders Grow: Becoming a Leader for Life (with Mark Miller, 2012), Berrett-Koehler Publishers; ISBN 9781609943035.
- Lead With LUV (with Colleen Barrett, 2011); ISBN 978-0-13-703974-6.
- Full Steam Ahead!: Unleash the Power of Vision in Your Work and Your Life, 2nd Edition (with Jesse Lyn Stoner, 2011), Berrett-Koehler Publishers, ISBN 9781609945503.
- Whale Done Parenting: How to Make Parenting a Positive Experience for You and Your Kids (with Thad Lacinak, Chuck Tompkins, and Jim Ballard, 2009), Berrett-Koehler Publishers; ISBN 9781605093482.
- Who Killed Change?: Solving the Mystery of Leading People Through Change (with John Britt, Pat Zigarmi, and Judd Hoekstra, 2009) ISBN 978-0-06-177893-3
- Helping People Win at Work: A Business Philosophy Called Don't Mark My Paper, Help Me Get an A (with Garry Ridge, 2009) ISBN 978-0-13-701171-1
- The One Minute Entrepreneur (with Don Hutson and Ethan Willis, 2008) ISBN 978-0-385-52602-9
- 4th Secret of the One Minute Manager: A Powerful Way to Make Things Better (with Margret McBride, 2008) ISBN 978-0-06-147031-8
- The Mulligan: A Parable of Second Chances (with Wally Armstrong) (Thomas Nelson, 2007) ISBN 978-0-8499-0323-6
- Go Team!: Take Your Team to the Next Level (with Alan Randolph, and Peter Grazier, 2007), Berrett-Koehler Publishers; ISBN 9781576754474.
- Know Can Do!: Put Your Know-How Into Action (with Paul J Meyer and Dick Ruhe, 2007), Berrett-Koehler Publishers; ISBN 9781576754689
- Leading at a Higher Level: Blanchard on Leadership and Creating High Performing Organizations (FT Press, 2006) ISBN 978-0-13-234772-3
- Lead Like Jesus: Lessons from the Greatest Leadership Role Model of All Time (with Phil Hodges) (Thomas Nelson, 2006) ISBN 978-0-8499-0040-2ISBN 9781576753606.
- The Simple Truths of Service (with Barbara Glanz) (Blanchard Family Partnership, 2005) ISBN 1-4013-0135-5
- Self Leadership and the One Minute Manager: Increasing Effectiveness Through Situational Self Leadership (with Susan Fowler and Laurence Hawkins) (William Morrow, 2005) ISBN 978-0-06-079912-0
- One Solitary Life (HarperCollins Business, 2005) ISBN 1-4041-0172-1
- The On-time, On-Target Manager (One Minute Manager) (with Steve Gottry) (HarperCollins Entertainment, 2004) ISBN 978-0-00-719035-5, ISBN 0-06-057459-3
- Heart of a Leader: Insights on the Art of Influence (HarperCollins Business, 2004) ISBN 0-7814-4543-4ISBN 0-7432-7028-2
- Customer Mania! It's Never Too Late to Build a Customer-Focused Company (Free Press, 2004) ISBN 978-0-7432-7028-1
- The Leadership Pill: The Missing Ingredient in Motivating People Today (HarperCollins Business, 2003) ISBN
- Servant Leader (HarperCollins Business, 2003) ISBN
- Managing By Values: How to Put Your Values into Action for Extraordinary Results (with Michael O'Connor, 2003) Berrett-Koehler Publishers; ISBN 9781576752746.
- Whale Done! : The Power of Positive Relationships (with Thad Lacinak, Chuck Tompkins, and Jim Ballard, HarperCollins Business, 2002) ISBN
- The One Minute Apology: A Powerful Way to Make Things Better (with Margaret McBride, HarperCollins Business, 2002) ISBN
- The Generosity Factor (TM), The (HarperCollins Business, August 1 2002) ISBN
- High Five! The Magic of Working Together (with Sheldon Bowles, HarperCollins Business, January 1 2001) ISBN
- Empowerment Takes More Than a Minute (with John P. Carlos and Alan Randolph, 2001), Berrett-Koehler Publishers, ISBN 9781576751534.
- The 3 Keys to Empowerment: Release the Power Within People for Astonishing Results (with John P. Carlos, and Alan Randolph, 2001), Berrett-Koehler Publishers, ISBN 9781576751602.
- Big Bucks! (with Sheldon Bowles, William Morrow, 2000) ISBN 0-688-17035-8
- The One Minute Manager Balances Work and Life (One Minute Manager Library) (HarperCollins Business, 1999) ISBN
- The One Minute Golfer: Enjoying the Great Game More (One Minute Manager Library) (HarperCollins Business, 1999) ISBN
- The 3 Keys to Empowerment: Release the Power Within People for Astonishing Results (HarperCollins Business, 1999) ISBN
- Leadership by the Book: Tools to Transform Your Workplace (with Bill Hybels and Phil Hodges, HarperCollins Business, 1999) ISBN
- Gung Ho! Turn On the People in Any Organization (with Sheldon Bowles, HarperCollins Business, 1998) ISBN
- Mission Possible: Becoming A World-Class Organization While There's Still Time (HarperCollins Business, 1996) ISBN
- Empowerement Takes More than a Minute (with John P Carlos and Alan Randolph, 1996) ISBN
- Raving Fans a Revolutionary Approach to Customer Service (with Sheldon Bowles, HarperCollins Business, 1993) ISBN
- Playing the Great Game of Golf: Making Every Minute Count (1992)
- The One Minute Manager Builds High Performing Teams (with Don Carew and Eunice Parisi-Carew, William Morrow & Co, 1990, 3rd ed, 2009)
- One Minute Manager Meets The Monkey, The (HarperCollins Business, 1989) ISBN
- Management of Organizational Behavior: Utilizing Human Resources (with Paul Hersey, 5th ed, 1988)
- The Power of Ethical Management (with Norman Vincent Peale, HarperCollins Business, 1988) ISBN
- The One Minute Manager Gets Fit (with D.W. Edington and Marjorie Blanchard, 1986) ISBN
- Leadership and the One Minute Manager: Increasing Effectiveness Through Situational Leadership (with Patricia Zigarmi and Drea Zigarmi, HarperCollins Business, 1985)

ISBN

- Organizational Change Through Effective Leadership (with Robert H. Guest and Paul Hersey, 2nd ed 1985) ISBN
- Putting the One Minute Manager to Work (with Robert Lobrber, William Morrow & Co, 1984) ISBN
- The One Minute Manager: The Quickest Way to Increase Your Own Prosperity (with Spencer Johnson, William Morrow & Co, 1982) ISBN 0-06-008579-7
- The Family Game: A Situational Approach to Effective Parenting (with Paul Hersey, 1979) ISBN
