= Communication and leadership during change =

Communication and leadership during change encompasses topics of communication (transmission of information) and leadership (influence or guidance) during change. The goal of leader development is "the expansion of the person's capacity to be effective in leadership roles and processes". The two central elements to this are leadership can be learned, people do learn, grow, and change, and that leader development helps to make a person effective in a variety of formal and informal leadership roles.

Leader development promotes personal growth by helping individuals develop their abilities to manage themselves, to work effectively with others, and to ensure that the work gets done. Leadership development promotes organizational growth, helping the group as a whole develop the leaders it needs to carry out such tasks, such as securing the commitment of members and setting direction.

Establishing connections between people who can help achieve someone's goals will increase your chances of emerging as a leader in an organizational context. A great deal of a leader's development happens internally.

== The difference between inside-out versus outside-in thinking ==
Leadership development is referred to as an inside-out process, which means it is based on internal thinking and intuition. This process starts within the leader and then moves outward to impact others. Whereas the outside-in thinking process takes its starting point from the employee's perspective and considers what is best for them and their needs. Outside-in thinking focuses more on improving efficiency for the customer’s sake, while inside-out thinking does not put the customer at the forefront of the experience. Unlike outside-in, the inside-out process is motivated by the “belief that the inner strengths and capabilities of the organization will make the organization prevail”. An easy way to differentiate these two processes is to think about the conditions surrounding a specific situation. To do this, you may ask yourself, is the coach an expert? Can the coach effectively communicate their knowledge? Is the performer interested in what the coach has to say? Does the performer have enough awareness to act on the advice? If the answer to all of these questions is yes, the outside in method is the most effective choice. If the answer to even just one of these questions is no, the inside out approach is the best option. Inside-out thinking can have a negative impact on opportunities, because this type of thinking can cause a person to miss out on opportunities as they are not considering external factors or ideas. Outside-in thinking tends to come with more benefits for a company, included but not limited to “reduced complaints, increased satisfaction, improved ease of doing business”.

== Habits and character principles ==
A leader's effectiveness is based on character principles like fairness, integrity, honesty, service, excellence, and growth. According to Stephen Covey's The Seven Habits of Highly Effective People, habits are a combination of knowledge (what to do and why to do it), skill (how to do it), and motivation (wanting to do it).

- Habit 1 – to be proactive: Proactive leaders realize that they can choose how they respond to events.
- Habit 2 – to begin with the end in mind: Effective leaders always keep their ultimate goals in mind.
- Habit 3 – to put first things first. Leader's time should be organized around priorities.
- Habit 4 – to think win/win: Those with win/win perspectives take a mutual gains approach to communication, believing that the best solution benefits both parties.
- Habit 5 – to seek first to understand, and then to be understood: Effective leaders put aside their personal concerns to engage in empathetic listening.
- Habit 6 – is to synergize: Synergy creates a solution that is greater than the sum of its parts.
- Habit 7 – is to sharpen the saw: Continual renewal of the physical, social/emotional, spiritual, and mental dimensions of the self.

Spirituality or other values has played a critical role in leaders development, helping them to make and follow through on their moral choices, develop virtues and character, identify their values and purpose, completing job assignments and handle hardships. There are some common spiritual practices that promote leader effectiveness, such as

- Treating others fairly
- Expressing care and concern
- Listening responsively
- Appreciating the contributions of others
- Engaging in reflective practice (reflecting over ones actions as a part of continuous learning), also known as "personal mastery" and the first pathway in Kevin Cashman's book Seven Pathways to Mastery (1998).

== Self-leadership ==
Kevin Cashman argued that leadership should be looked at from within. According to Cashman, leadership can be defined as the "authentic self-expression that creates value." This form of leadership can be found at all levels within an organization. He identifies seven pathways for individuals to lead from the inside out. Instead of a hierarchical order, these pathways are created holistically.

Pathway one: Personal mastery

- Exploring and getting to know yourself and what is important to you.

Pathway two: Purpose mastery

- Focusing on understanding and using your gifts and talents to add value to those around you
- Identifying activities that are energizing and exciting

Pathway three: Change mastery

- Letting go of old patterns to enhance creativity
- Being adaptable and willing to change
- Changing current reality allows a leader to see a new reality

Pathway four: Interpersonal mastery

- Focusing on the development of interpersonal competencies
- Seeking feedback from others will help to improve personal relationships

Pathway five: Being mastery

- Using periods of peace and silence to understand one's inner most being

Pathway six: Balance mastery

- Taking time for self, family and friends is critical to maintaining balance in life
- Achieving balance may be one of the most difficult pathways to master, but is viewed by Cashman as the most important

Pathway seven: Action mastery

- Leading as a whole person by getting in touch with one's authentic self and expressing it to others

== Leading followers through change ==
According to Steven Klepper (1997), there are four main periods organizations go through in the organizational life cycle when there is change within.

- The formative period is when a new organization is just getting started. Although there is a founding vision, there are no formal definitions. This is just as well because normally there are a lot of experimentation and innovation taking place. These activities of creative changes and discovery are needed to overcome obstacles and accomplish breakthroughs.
- The rapid growth period is when direction and coordination is added to the organization to sustain growth and solidify gains. Change is focused on defining the purpose of the organization and on the mainstream business.
- The mature period is when the strong growth curve levels off to the overall pace of the economy. Changes are needed to maintain established markets and assuring maximum gains are achieved.
- The declining period will for many organizations mean downsizing and reorganization. To survive, changes include tough objectives and compassionate implementation. The goal is to get out of the old and into something new. Success in this period means that the four periods start over again.

Because organizational change is inevitable, leaders must be open to adapting. In order to handle change, organizations need flexible leaders to help guide them through uncertainty. It is vital that the leader keeps the core values of the company intact while they handle change to ensure that the company still meets the needs of its customers. Some leaders will take note of previous leaders and adopt certain things that were successful that those other leaders did when they went through change. The leader needs to keep the other employees focused during this change period.

== Communication and leadership as an internal process ==
According to Hackman and Johnson, communication is an integral part of the internal process of leaders. Leaders must face many obstacles and challenging situations that can lead to personal growth. Much of the personal development that occurs for leaders is done as an internal process.

As they personally deal with issues, they make decisions that affect their lives and the lives of others. Intrapersonal communication plays an important role in the decision-making process and for personal development of the leader. This inwardly communication does eventually manifest itself in outward effects.

=== Personal development as an internal process ===
Personal development is an important aspect of leadership. The need for programs and courses specializing in personal development is widely accepted across a variety of fields from science to religion.

Leadership programs focus on both the outward display or leadership and the inward attitudes, behaviors, and beliefs. Many of the authors of leadership books around the turn of the century began highlighting the internal process side of leadership development including Stephen Covey, author of The 7 Habits of Highly Effective People, and Kevin Cashman, author of Leadership from the Inside Out. Both were widely successful best-sellers which focused on internal concepts such as "Being Proactive", Habit 1 in Covey's 7 Habits, or "Personal Mastery", the first pathway in Cashman's Seven Pathways to Mastery.

=== Role of intrapersonal communication ===
When leaders begin self-reflective analysis of themselves, they begin to engage in intrapersonal communication. Intrapersonal communication is defined as communication occurring within the individual mind or self. It can be as simple as internal thoughts or more complex neurophysiological means of examining our self. There is a long history of research on intrapersonal communication and its connection to internal development. Individuals frequently engage in intrapersonal communication as a means of self-awareness and it is an internal process related to personal development.

For leaders, there are many benefits with intrapersonal communication. Intrapersonal communication can increase self-awareness. It can give the leader a better view of their self. Research shows it is a means of overcoming communication apprehension, for both interpersonal and public communication. These are some of the benefits for the leader who engages in intrapersonal communication as an internal process for personal development.

== Innovative leadership and change ==
There is little peer-reviewed material on the intermingling of innovation and leadership. It is, however, very evident that great innovation comes from great leaders. Steve Jobs is an example of one of the great technological innovators of our time. As a new phenomenon and thought, many are seeking out how leadership effects innovation and vice versa. Many acknowledge the need for public sector support and societal support of innovation in order for funding to occur, and in turn, innovation to occur, many universities are implementing innovation networks, and the necessity for unique and independent thinkers is apparent. Google says, "Our commitment to innovation depends on everyone being comfortable sharing ideas and opinions".

=== Transformational leadership and innovation ===
Transformational leadership, a type of leadership that has an ability to change an organization, would likely produce innovation. Since innovation is more than simply invention, the process of leadership can in and of itself be innovative. Innovation is a crucial part of being an effective and productive transformational leader. A transformational leader is creative, interactive, visionary, empowering, and passionate. The subordinates self-concept function determines how the follower will react to the leader. The capabilities and strengths of a leader to be a leader have a direct effect on an organization's success. Oftentimes, leaders are not trained well in leadership development, leaving them unprepared to foster an environment of innovation. An innovative leader is a transformational leader.
