= Organizational diagnostics =

In organizational development, corporate diagnostics provides tools for the effective diagnosis of organizational culture, and structural and operational strengths and weaknesses.

As Beckhard said in the preface to his seminal work:

... in our rapidly changing environment, new organization forms must be developed; more effective goal-setting and planning processes must be learned, and practiced teams of independent people must spend real time improving their methods of working, decision-making and communicating. Competing or conflicting groups must move towards a collaborative way of work. In order for these changes to occur and be maintained, a planned, managed change effort is necessary - a program of organizational development.

Since the beginnings of organizational development as a profession, diagnosis has moved from the purely behavioral towards a strategic and holistic business diagnostic approach, and from looking at human interventions in isolation to exploring the interactions of people in the context in which they operate. As organizations are more collaborative in nature, the traditional silo approach to diagnostics is becoming increasingly rare. Organizational development and in particular the diagnostic phase of activities is spreading from the occupational psychologists towards mainstream business. This is important for OD practitioners as the role is increasingly holistic.

== The organizational diagnosis models ==
The following models have been introduced for organizational diagnosis:

1. Force Field Analysis (1951)
2. Leavitt's model (1965)
3. Likert system analysis (1967)
4. Weisbord's six-box model; (1976) defined by focusing on one major output, exploring the extent to which consumers of the output are satisfied with it, and tracing the reasons for any dissatisfaction.
5. Congruence model for organization analysis (1977)
6. Mckinsey 7s framework (1981-1982)
7. Tichy's technical political cultural (TPC) framework (1983)
8. High-performance programming (1984)
9. Diagnosing individual and group behavior (1987)
10. Burke–Litwin model of organizational performance and change (1992)
11. Ad Valoris's Holistis model (2014) focuses on internal capabilities and strength of an organisation performance component such as tools, processes, competencies, structure and monitoring. It has been developed by the company Ad Valoris in Switzerland.

All models are based on open system (Open System Theory, OST): From the General System Theory defined by Von Bertalanffy (a system complex of interacting elements), Katz and Kahn (1978) apply the concept of Open System Theory (OST), looking at the relationship between the organizations and the environment in which they are involved. This focus reflects on the organization's ability to adapt to changes in environment conditions (with or without the need for information processing). (Boulding, 1956; Katz and Kahn, 1978)

1. Falletta's organizational intelligence model (2008)
2. Semantic Network Analysis (2014) (by Zarei, Chaghouee and Ghapanchi)

== The consulting process ==
The organizational diagnostic phase is often integrated within an overall OD process, commonly called 'a consulting process'. An example of such a process is:

Entry → Diagnosis → Action Planning → Implementation → Termination

As the second phase in the consulting cycle, it is also the first fully operational phase of the consulting process or cycle. The purpose of the diagnosis is to examine the problem faced by the organization in detail, to identify factors and forces that are causing the problem and to prepare the collected information to decide how to implement possible solutions to the identified problems.

The diagnosis of the problem is a separate phase from the solutions themselves.

== See also ==
- Managing change
- Organizational communication
- Organizational culture
- Organizational development
- Organizational learning
- Organizational performance
- Outline of consulting
- Performance improvement
- Sociomapping
- SWOT Analysis
