= Change management =

Management discipline studying human transformational processes within organizations

Change management (CM) is a discipline that focuses on managing changes within an organization. Change management involves implementing approaches to prepare and support individuals, teams, and leaders in making organizational change. Change management is useful when organizations are considering major changes such as restructure, redirecting or redefining resources, updating or refining business process and systems, or introducing or updating digital technology.

Organizational change management (OCM) considers the full organization and what needs to change, while change management may be used solely to refer to how people and teams are affected by such organizational transition. It deals with many different disciplines, from behavioral and social sciences to information technology and business solutions.

As change management becomes more necessary in the business cycle of organizations, it is beginning to be taught as its own academic discipline at universities. There are a growing number of universities with research units dedicated to the study of organizational change. One common type of organizational change may be aimed at reducing outgoing costs while maintaining financial performance, in an attempt to secure future profit margins.

In a project management context, the term "change management" may be used as an alternative to change control processes wherein formal or informal changes to a project are formally introduced and approved.

Drivers of change may include the ongoing evolution of technology, internal reviews of processes, crisis response, customer demand changes, competitive pressure, modifications in legislation, acquisitions and mergers, and organizational restructuring.

== History ==
=== Pre-1960s ===
Kurt Lewin was a social scientist who researched learning and social conflict. Lewin's first venture into change management began with his research on field theory in 1921. Five years later, Lewin began a series of about 20 articles to explain field theory. He later published Principles of Topological Psychology in 1936, which was his most in-depth look at field theory. Shortly before his death, Lewin wrote two articles titled Human Relations which form the foundation of his three-step model.

In 1934, Lewin set up a proposal to create an action research-orientated department of psychology at the Hebrew University of Jerusalem. Shortly after, Lewin moved to America and started up other action research initiatives with children, housewives, religious groups, racial intolerance, and leadership. During this time, Lewin became the first psychologist to study group dynamics. His definition of a "group" from this project is still used today; "It is not the similarity or dissimilarity of individuals that constitutes a group, but interdependence of fate."

=== 1960s ===
Many change management models and processes have their roots in grief studies. As consultants observed a correlation between grieving due to health-related issues and grieving among employees in organizations because of the loss of jobs and departments, many early change models captured the full range of human emotions as employees mourned job-related transitions.

In his work on diffusion of innovations, Everett Rogers posited that change must be understood in the context of time, communication channels, and its impact on all affected participants. Placing people at the core of change thinking was a fundamental contribution to developing the concept of change management. He proposed the descriptive Adopter groups of how people respond to change: Innovators, Early Adopters, Early Majority, Late Majority and Laggards.

=== 1980s ===
McKinsey & Company consultant Julien Phillips published a change management model in 1982 in the journal Human Resource Management.

Robert Marshak has since credited the big six accounting and consulting firms with adopting the work of early organizational change pioneers, such as Daryl Conner and Don Harrison, thereby contributing to the legitimization of a whole change management industry when they branded their re-engineering services as change management in the 1980s.

In the late 1980s, General Electric under Jack Welch was somewhat shell-shocked and demoralized following several years of organizational restructuring and de-layering that resulted in far fewer people but the same amount of work, while saddled with a stifling bureaucracy. Welch directed a team that ultimately included Dave Ulrich, Todd Jick, Steve Kerr, and Ron Ashkenas among others, to create a process to "get unnecessary work out of the system." The process became known as Work-Out, which was similar in concept to Quality Circles that were made popular by Japanese companies in the 1980s. “In small teams, people challenge prevailing assumptions about ‘the way we've always done things’ and come up with recommendations for dramatic improvements in organizational processes. The Work-Out teams present their recommendations to a senior leader in a Town Meeting where the manager engages the entire group in a dialog about the recommendations and then makes a yes-no decision on the spot. Recommendations for changing the organization are then assigned to ‘owners’ who have volunteered to carry them out and follow through to get results. That's Work-Out in a nutshell.” “[Work-Out] is also a catalyst for creating an empowered workforce that has the self-confidence to challenge the inevitable growth of organizational bureaucracy. It can help create a culture that is fast-moving, innovative, and without boundaries.”

=== 1990s ===
In 1990, The Fifth Discipline: The Art and Practice of the Learning Organization by Peter Senge was published. In 1997, Harvard Business Review identified The Fifth Discipline as one of the seminal management books of the previous 75 years. For this work, he was named "Strategist of the Century" by the Journal of Business Strategy, which said that he was one of a very few people who "had the greatest impact on the way we conduct business today." According to Senge, there are four challenges in initiating changes: 1. There must be a compelling case for change. 2. There must be time to change. 3. There must be help during the change process. 4. As the perceived barriers to change are removed, it is important that some new problem, not before considered important or perhaps not even recognized, doesn't become a critical barrier.

The first edition of Managing Transitions: Making the Most of Change by William Bridges was published in 1991. Bridges emphasized the importance of managing the psychology of transitions, consisting of three phases: letting go of the past, the "neutral zone" where the past is gone but the new isn't fully present, and making the new beginning.

The 1990 oil price shock occurred as a result of the Iraqi invasion of Kuwait on August 2, 1990 and contributed to the recession of the early 1990s in the United States. At General Electric, Jack Welch and the senior leadership team were forced to abandon methodically developed strategic plans. Welch recognized the obvious problem with long-term planning – no one can predict the future. Welch has been quoted by Steve Kerr as saying, “It's not that we're surprised that bugs me, it's that we're surprised that we're surprised that bugs me.” He recognized the advantage of being able to react to change faster than GE's competitors. Welch commissioned a team, including Dave Ulrich and Steve Kerr, to create a process to "accelerate change" throughout GE. “Thus in 1992 and 1993, some of the external faculty, in collaboration with Crotonville staff, developed and implemented the Change Acceleration Process (CAP) as a follow-up to Work-Out. In this process, drawn from experiences with other companies, teams of managers from a business took on major change projects and learned how to orchestrate an entire change effort.”

In his 1993 book, Managing at the Speed of Change, Daryl Conner coined the term 'burning platform' based on the 1988 North Sea Piper Alpha oil rig fire. He went on to found Conner Partners in 1994, focusing on the human performance and adoption techniques that would help ensure technology innovations were absorbed and adopted as best as possible. The first State of the Change Management Industry report was published in the Consultants News in February 1995.

In the mid-90s, John Kotter authors arguably the most influential publications in the history of Change Management. Leading Change: Why Transformation Efforts Fail appeared in a 1995 issue of the Harvard Business Review, and his follow-up book, Leading Change published in 1996.

Who Moved My Cheese? An Amazing Way to Deal with Change in Your Work and in Your Life, published in 1998, is a bestselling seminal work by Spencer Johnson. The text describes the way one reacts to major change in one's work and life, and four typical reactions to those changes by two mice and two "Littlepeople," during their hunt for "cheese." A New York Times business bestseller up on release, Who Moved My Cheese? remained on the list for almost five years and spent over 200 weeks on Publishers Weekly's hardcover nonfiction list.

=== 2000s ===
Linda Ackerman Anderson states in Beyond Change Management that in the late 1980s and early 1990s, top leaders, growing dissatisfied with the failures of creating and implementing changes in a top-down fashion, created the role of the change leader to take responsibility for the human side of change.

=== 2010s ===
In response to lack of understanding in how to manage change in large projects and programs of work, Christina Dean (author of RIMER Managing Successful Change Professional Edition), established the Australian Government National Competency Standards at Diploma Level, and RIMER as the Australian National Competency Standard Certification. RIMER is a Project Based approach to managing change, which introduced the concept of Enterprise Change Management. Christina also influenced the Human Resource Management Institute and Project Management Institute Industry Associations to include Change Management in their Academic programmes to Masters Level. By 2016, all Australian Universities offered programs that provided a formal vocational pathway, through a HRM or Project Management.

In response to continuing reports of the failure of large-scale top-down plan-driven change programmes, innovative change practitioners have been reporting success with applying Lean and Agile principles to the field of change management.

=== 2020s ===
The 2020s have seen a marked evolution in change management, shaped by global disruptions and rapid technological adoption. The COVID-19 pandemic accelerated the need for agile and digitally enabled change practices, as organisations adapted to remote and hybrid work models, supply chain instability, and new employee wellbeing priorities.

During this period, change management increasingly intersected with digital transformation and organisational resilience disciplines. Many organisations integrated change approaches into broader enterprise agility frameworks such as Scaled Agile Framework (SAFe) and DevOps. The emphasis shifted from managing discrete projects to enabling continuous change, supported by digital tools for communication, analytics, and feedback.

Advancements in artificial intelligence (AI), automation, and data analytics have also influenced the field. Practitioners began using AI-enabled sentiment analysis, predictive analytics, and adaptive learning platforms to monitor change adoption and engagement.

Now, scholars, practitioners and organizations in the 2020s suggest organizational practices emphasizing dynamic, participatory, and evidence-based approaches, compared to previously held static top-down models.

== Approach ==
Organizational change management employs a structured approach to ensure that changes are documented and implemented smoothly and successfully to achieve lasting benefits.

=== Reasons for change ===
Globalization and accelerated innovation of technology result in a constantly evolving business environment. Phenomena such as social media and mobile adaptability have revolutionized business and the effect of this is an ever-increasing need for change, and therefore change management. The growth in technology also has a secondary effect of increasing the availability and therefore accountability of knowledge. Easily accessible information has resulted in unprecedented scrutiny from stockholders and the media and pressure on management. With the business environment experiencing so much change, organizations must then learn to become comfortable with change as well. Therefore, the ability to manage and adapt to organizational change is an essential ability required in the workplace today. However, major and rapid organizational change is profoundly difficult because the structure, culture, and routines of organizations often reflect a persistent and difficult-to-remove "imprint" of past periods, which are resistant to radical change even as the current environment of the organization changes rapidly.

Due to the growth of technology, modern organizational change is largely motivated by exterior innovations rather than internal factors. When these developments occur, the organizations that adapt quickest create a competitive advantage for themselves, while the companies that refuse to change get left behind. This can result in drastic profit or market-share losses. Organizational change directly affects all departments and employees. The entire company must learn how to handle changes to the organization. The effectiveness of change management can have a strong positive or negative impact on employee morale.

=== Change models ===
There are several models of change management:

==== Human-Centred Design Change ====
Human-centred design (HCD) has emerged as a significant approach within change management, emphasising empathy, co-creation and iterative feedback with the individuals impacted by change rather than adopting only a top-down model.

Drawing upon design-thinking principles, HCD seeks to engage stakeholders actively in defining the problem, exploring solutions and shaping the change experience.

Proponents argue that by involving employees and other stakeholders in designing the change, not just executing it, organisations can enhance buy-in, reduce resistance and accelerate adoption. Academics note the “intersection of change management and human-centred design” as a growing focus for effective transformation.

Practically, HCD change approaches emphasise three core capabilities:

1. Co-creation and stakeholder engagement – engaging diverse groups in problem-framing and ideation rather than only communicating predetermined plans;
2. Continuous learning and adaptation – treating change as an iterative process with frequent feedback loops and adjustments;
3. Human experience focus – shifting from purely process, technology or system change to attending to behaviours, emotions, empathy and meaning for individuals.

This shift complements existing change frameworks (e.g., those derived from organisational development or project-based change) and reflects an increasing organisational emphasis on the human dimension of transformation.

=== Accelerating Implementation Methodology (AIM) ===
Accelerating Implementation Methodology (AIM) was developed by Don Harrison at Implementation Management Associates (IMA) in the 1980s, now called IMA Worldwide. AIM draws a distinction between installation (the technical deployment of a change) and implementation, which it defines as the point at which affected individuals consistently perform new behaviors in their daily work. The framework identifies sponsorship, target readiness, and reinforcement as the primary drivers of adoption, and treats resistance as a predictable, manageable variable rather than an obstacle. AIM has been applied across industries including healthcare, finance, and technology, and is used by both internal change practitioners and external consultants. AIM provides a structured framework of exactly 10 practice areas that can be applied to any category of organizational change.

- Define the Change
- Build Agent Capacity
- Assess the Climate
- Generate Sponsorship
- Determine Change Approach
- Develop Target Readiness
- Build Communication Plan
- Develop Reinforcement Strategy
- Create Cultural Fit
- Prioritize Action

==== Lean Change Management ====
Lean Change Management is an ecosystem of modern change management ideas created by Jason Little. Inspired by Lean Startup, Agile, and Design Thinking, Lean Change Management is designed to help change agents create an adaptable, and contextual approach to change

- focus on creating shared purpose over creating false urgency
- focus on enabling meaningful dialogue over broadcasting change communications
- focus on experimentation over executing tasks in the plan
- focus on understanding the response to change over blaming people for resisting
- focus on co-creation of change over getting buy-in

Jason began developing Lean Change Management in 2009 as a response to outdated traditional change management approaches designed in a pre-digital world.

==== Kurt Lewin's 3-step change model ====
Kurt Lewin, a German-American psychologist, developed this 3-step model to implement change. The model consists of three steps:

- Unfreezing, which "destabilizes the equilibrium", that is, breaking down the old attitude and behaviours, customs and traditions, and "unleashes some energy for change", that is, making members willing and ready to accept the change by promoting the new ideas
- Changing, which involves entering the change using collaboration and action research
- Refreezing, the stabilizing stage in which new policies and standards becomes normal way of life

Some scholars have criticised Lewin's model as simplistic — Kanter, Stein and Jick described it as 'quaintly linear and static'. This original model, "developed in the 1920s and fully articulated in Lewin's ... book Principles of Topological Psychology" (1936), paved the way for other change models to be developed in the future. Burnes argues that Lewin's model was "far from being simplistic".

==== The Change Acceleration Process ====
- Setting up for success – Convene a team that includes senior leadership and representatives from all affected stakeholder groups. Establish ground rules and promote communication.
- Leading Change – Ensure that leaders commit to being visible and supportive of the initiative throughout the duration.
- Creating A Shared Need – Ensure there are compelling reasons for change that will appeal to all stakeholders not just to the leadership team.
- Shaping a Vision - Leadership must articulate a clear and legitimate vision of the organization after the change. All stakeholders should be able to see how they fit in the future state.
- Mobilizing Commitment - Once you have leadership support, compelling logic for change, and a clear vision of the future, you have the necessary ingredients to roll out your initiative. Leverage “early adopters,” to pilot the initiative and build momentum. Plan and execute a change strategy.
- Making Change Last – Leverage early wins. Assess what is helping and hindering the initiative and adjust your plans. Use the knowledge gained in your pilots and transfer learning and best practices to your broader rollout. Plan for integrating with other existing, potentially competing, initiatives.
- Monitoring Progress - Plan for measuring the progress of your change initiative. Set benchmarks — realize them – share results and celebrate.
- Changing Systems and Structures - Every business has underlying systems and structures that support the current state of the business (For example: hiring & staffing, training & development, resource allocation, organizational design, codified processes, etc.). Change them as necessary to support the desired future state and ensure that the changes become permanent.

==== John Kotter's 8-Step Process for Leading Change ====
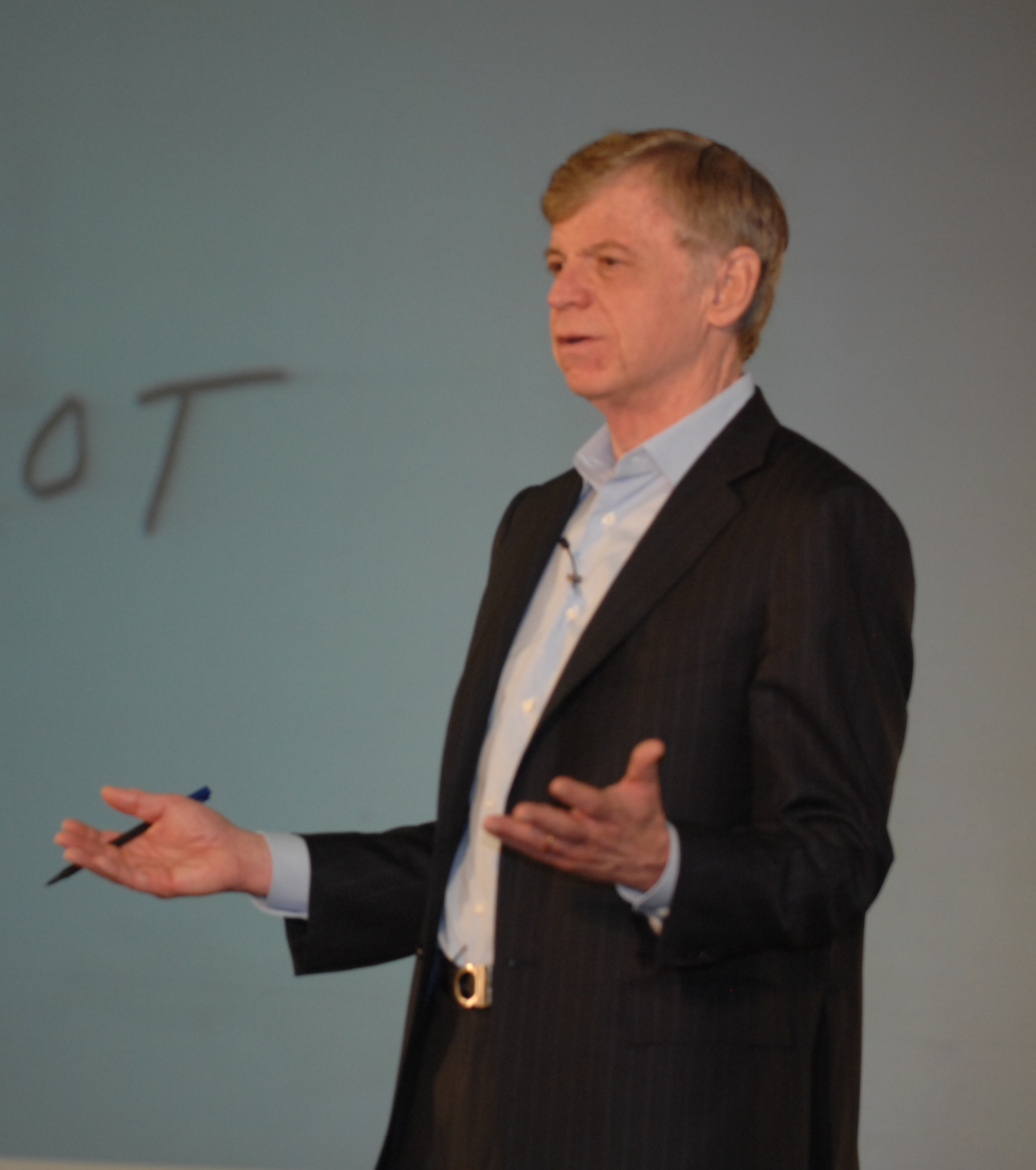
John P. Kotter, a pioneer of change management, invented the 8-Step Process for Leading Change.

John P. Kotter, the Konosuke Matsushita Professor of Leadership, Emeritus, at the Harvard Business School is considered the most influential expert of change management. He invented the 8-Step Process for Leading Change. It consists of eight stages:

- Create a Sense of Urgency
- Build a Guiding Coalition
- Form a Strategic Vision and Initiatives
- Enlist a Volunteer Army
- Enable Action by Removing Barriers
- Generate Short-Term Wins
- Sustain Acceleration
- Institute Change

These steps are very much tied to Lewin's model and build upon his simplistic process of creating change. They follow the same general steps of Lewin's model: Unfreezing, Changing, and Refreezing.

==== Change Management Foundation and Model ====
The Change Management Foundation is shaped like a pyramid with project management managing technical aspects and people implementing change at the base and leadership setting the direction at the top. The Change Management Model consists of four stages:

- Determine Need for Change
- Prepare & Plan for Change
- Implement the Change
- Sustain the Change

==== The Prosci ADKAR Model ====
The Prosci ADKAR Model is an individual change framework created by Jeff Hiatt. ADKAR is an acronym that represents the five building blocks of successful change for an individual:

- Awareness of the need for change
- Desire to participate and support in the change
- Knowledge of what to do during and after the change
- Ability to realize or implement the change as required
- Reinforcement to ensure the results of a change continue

The ADKAR Model is prescriptive and goal-oriented, each milestone must be achieved to define success. It uses a 1–5 scale to determine how strongly an individual meets the requirements of each milestone. If a person scores a three or below, that specific step must be addressed before moving forward, Prosci defines this as a barrier point.

=== The Plan-Do-Check-Act Cycle, and choosing which changes to implement ===
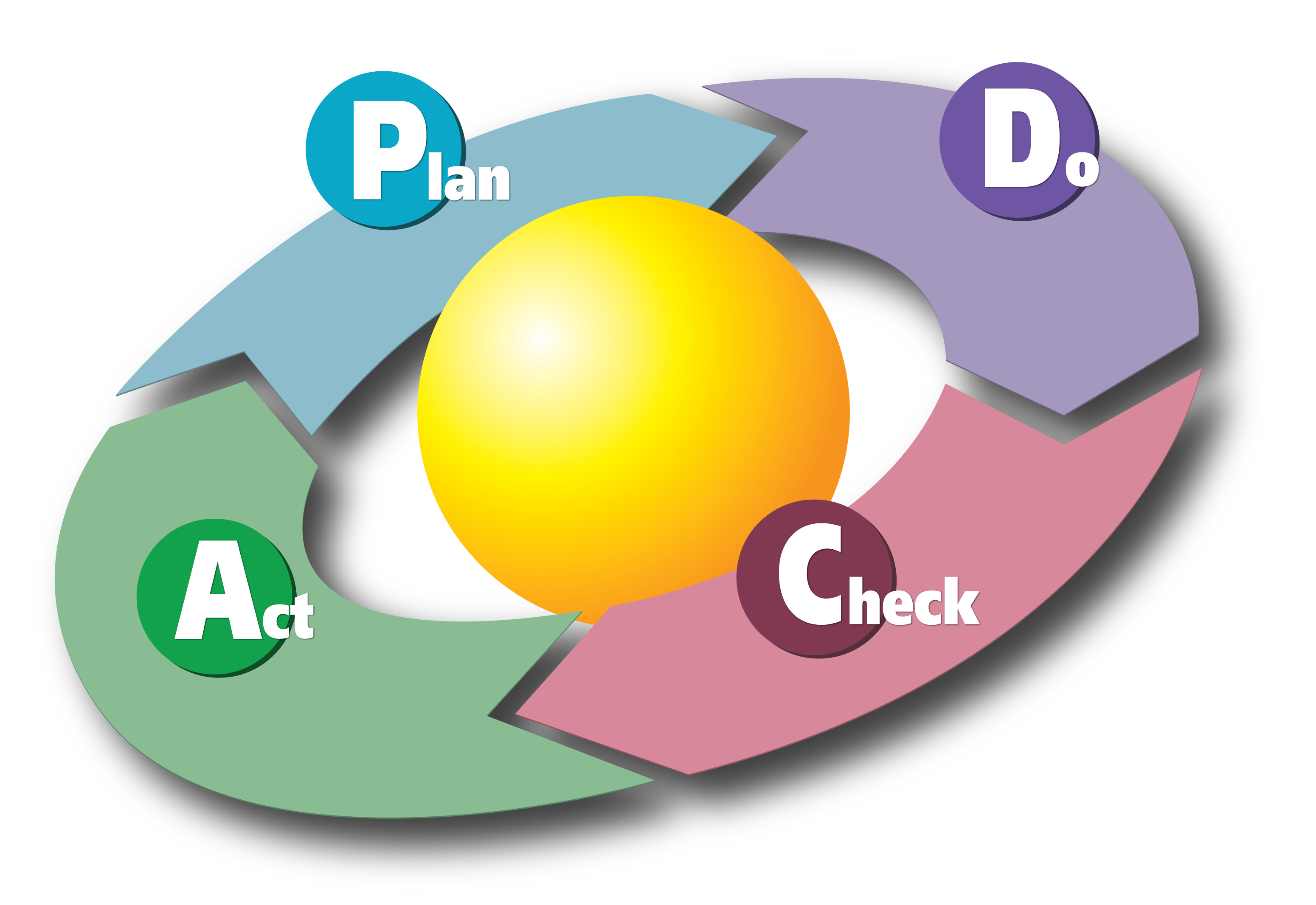
The Plan-Do-Check-Act (PDCA) Cycle created by W. Edwards Deming

The Plan-Do-Check-Act Cycle, created by W. Edwards Deming, is a management method to improve business method for control and continuous improvement of choosing which changes to implement. When determining which of the latest techniques or innovations to adopt, there are four major factors to be considered:

- Levels, goals, and strategies
- Measurement system
- Sequence of steps
- Implementation and organizational changes

The Plan-Do-Check-Act (PDCA) cycle, often referred to as the Deming Cycle, is a scientific method for testing concepts and putting changes into action that helps make better decisions. The focus on small-scale plan testing initially, which lowers the possibility of broad problems and encourages fault avoidance, is what distinguishes PDCA. By gathering data to evaluate the efficacy of improvements, it also promotes ongoing progress. Organizations may practice scientific management and promote continuous improvement by employing PDCA, which focuses on finding and fixing the underlying causes of issues.

=== Balogun and Hope Hailey types of change ===
Balogun and Hope identified four different classifications of change that depend on the speed of change and the extent of change:

- Evolution, involves implementing change slowly through interrelated initiatives.
- Adaption, involves undertaking a series of steps to realign the company culture.
- Revolution, involves taking huge steps to change company culture.
- Reconstruction is change undertaken to realign the company culture and is often forced and reactive, involving many initiatives.

=== Managing the change process ===
Although there are many types of organizational changes, the critical aspect is a company's ability to win the buy-in of their organization's employees on the change. Effectively managing organizational change is a four-step process:

- Recognizing the changes in the broader business environment
- Developing the necessary adjustments for their company's needs
- Training their employees on the appropriate changes
- Winning the support of the employees with the persuasiveness of the appropriate adjustments

As a multi-disciplinary practice that has evolved as a result of scholarly research, organizational change management should begin with a systematic diagnosis of the current situation in order to determine both the need for change and the capability to change. The objectives, content, and process of change should all be specified as part of a change management plan. Change management processes should include creative marketing to enable communication between changing audiences, as well as deep social understanding about leadership styles and group dynamics. As a visible track on transformation projects, organizational change management aligns groups' expectations, integrates teams, and manages employee training. It makes use of performance metrics, such as financial results, operational efficiency, leadership commitment, communication effectiveness, and the perceived need for change in order to design appropriate strategies, resolve troubled change projects, and avoid change failures.

=== Factors of successful change management ===
Successful change management is more likely to occur if the following are included:

- Define measurable stakeholder aims and create a business case for their achievement (which should be continuously updated)
- Monitor assumptions, risks, dependencies, costs, return on investment, dis-benefits and cultural issues
- Effective communication that informs various stakeholders of the reasons for the change (why?), the benefits of successful implementation (what is in it for us, and you) as well as the details of the change (when? where? who is involved? how much will it cost? etc.)
- Devise an effective education, training and skills-upgrading scheme for the organization
- Counter resistance from the employees of companies and align them to overall strategic direction of the organization
- Provide personal counseling (if required) to alleviate any change-related fears
- Monitoring implementation and fine-tuning as and when required

=== Reasons for failure ===
Research into change management has identified a number of reasons why change might fail:

- Inappropriate executive sponsorship, in particular where the executive sponsor does not have a sufficiently senior position within the organisation
- Starting on a solution before the underlying problem [that requires the change] is fully understood
- Failure to spend time on systematically analyzing the people and styles that are involved
- Jumping to a solution to the problem
- Failure to validate the proposed solutions
- Failure to communicate what is happening and why
- Failure to plan for certainty
- Failure to define measurable outcomes and way-points
- Absence of strong governance in place, particularly around dependencies
- Not dealing properly with risk and contingency
- Lack of shared commitment and leadership
- Lack of a clear sense of urgency when warning signs are clear
- Lack of ability to recognize obstacles to the vision
- Lack of planning for and creating short-term wins
- When firms are very complex—for example, when they are strongly diversified in unrelated industries
- Poor anchoring of changes within an organisation's culture
- Change fatigue

== Challenges ==
Change management is faced with the fundamental difficulties of integration and navigation, and human factors. Change management must also take into account the human aspect where emotions and how they are handled play a significant role in implementing change successfully.

=== Integration ===
Traditionally, organizational development (OD) departments overlooked the role of infrastructure and the possibility of carrying out change through technology. Now, managers almost exclusively focus on the structural and technical components of change. Alignment and integration between strategic, social, and technical components requires collaboration between people with different skill-sets.

=== Navigation ===
Managing change over time, referred to as navigation, requires continuous adaptation. It requires managing projects over time against a changing context, from interorganizational factors to marketplace volatility. It also requires a balance in bureaucratic organizations between top-down and bottom-up management, ensuring employee empowerment and flexibility.

=== Human factors ===
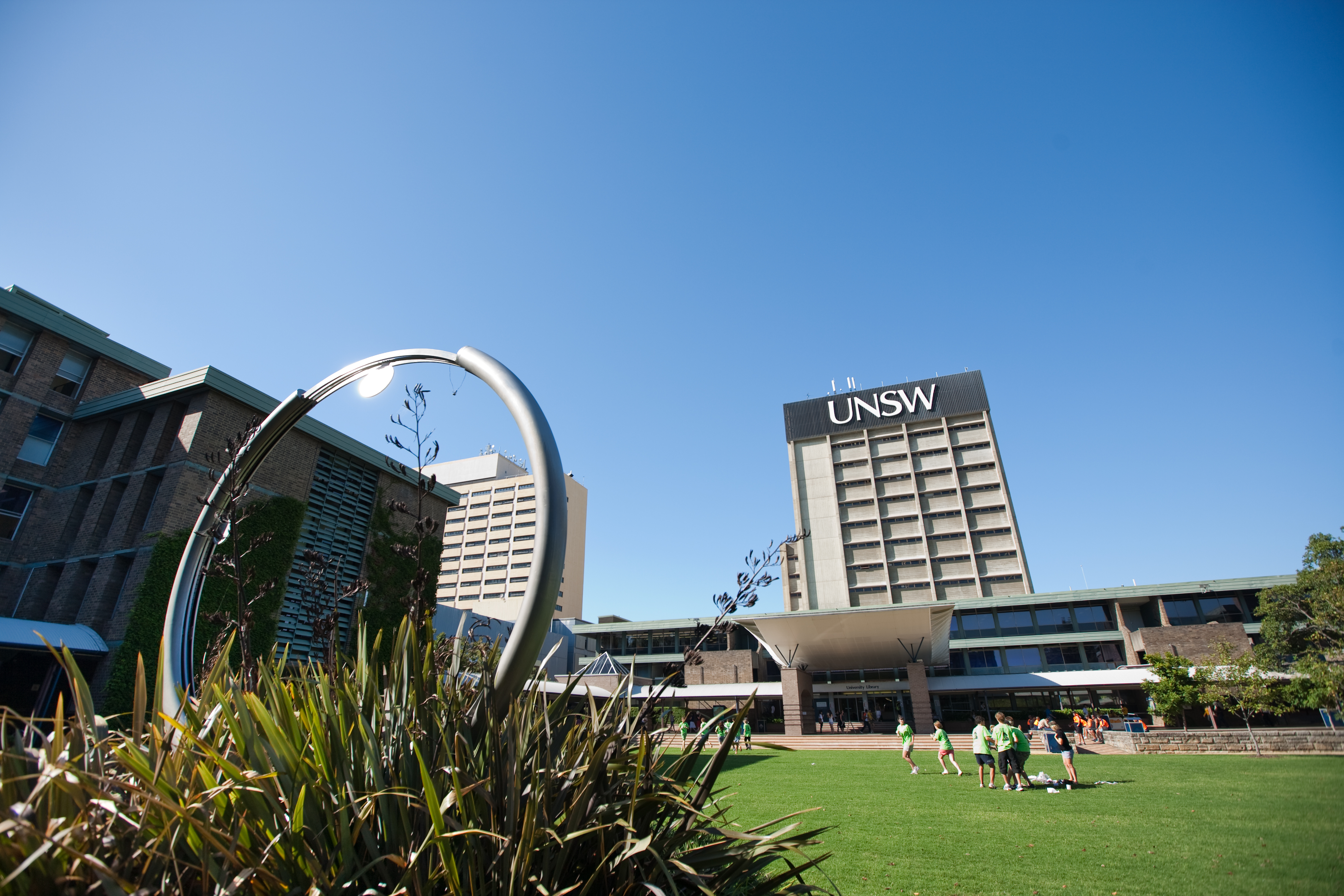
The University of New South Wales offers a Graduate Certificate in Change Management (GCCM).

One of the major factors which hinders the change management process is people's natural tendency for inertia. Just as in Newton's first law of motion, people are resistant to change in organizations because it can be uncomfortable. The notion of doing things this way, because 'this is the way we have always done them,' can be particularly hard to overcome. Furthermore, in cases where a company has seen declining fortunes, for a manager or executive to view themselves as a key part of the problem can be very humbling. This issue can be exacerbated in countries where "saving face" plays a large role in inter-personal relations. As mentioned above, there are some groups that prioritize their own benefits above organizations' benefits, and involving such groups into organizational change will naturally create obstacles, and some departments may directly or indirectly resist organizational change due to the conflicts of their interests.

To assist with this, a number of models have been developed which help identify their readiness for change and then to recommend the steps through which they could move. A common example is ADKAR, an acronym which stands for Awareness, Desire, Knowledge, Ability and Reinforcement. This model was developed by researcher and entrepreneur Jeff Hiatt in 1996 and first published in a white paper entitled The Perfect Change in 1999. Hiatt explained that the process of becoming ready for change is sequential, starting from the current level of each individual, and none of the five steps could be avoided: "they cannot be skipped or reordered."

=== Transformation saturation ===
Transformation saturation is the threshold where an individual or organization can no longer effectively process or integrate any more change. When the capacity for tolerating disruption is exceeded, entities may exhibit maladaptation, and becomes overwhelmed, leading to exhaustion, resistance, and a decline in efficiency and performance. This may result in individual and organizational apathy, confusion, disengagement, and opposition.

The rate at which transformation saturation is reached is determined by the timing of when the change begins, the pace of change, and the length and magnitude of the transformation.

=== Threat rigidity ===
Threat rigidity is inflexibility to change in the face of threats that may justify change. It is an organizational behavior where the response to perceived threats is an inflexible adherence to established routines and behaviors, even when change may be more appropriate.

Threat rigidity can lead to employee disengagement. The return to office initiative has been in part attributed to threat rigidity. The contingency theory provides an alternative to threat rigidity enabling changes to occur. The term was coinned in a 1981 paper Threat Rigidity Effects in Organizational Behavior: A Multilevel Analysis.

== Solutions to overcoming challenges and avoiding failure ==
When going through change, many organizations and individuals fail and are faced with challenges when implementing change. There are many measures organizations and individuals can take to avoid failure and overcome challenges.

=== Human factors ===
When faced with a resistance to change by individuals, there are many strategies to get individuals to change. Morten T. Hansen proposed the following ten methods to induce personal change.

- Embrace the power of one – Focus on one behavior to change at a time. This is because people are not good at multi-tasking.
- Make it sticky – With the goal to change behavior, to do this effectively the goal must be measurable and concrete.
- Paint a vivid picture – To be effective in getting change for people, tap into their emotions and paint them a picture of where they currently are and offer up the vision of where they should want to get to.
- Activate peer pressure – As individuals people look to others in their immediate circle for approval. These peers can set the expectations to what is acceptable behavior. Leaders can implore these people to apply pressure and get the change that is desired.
- Mobilize the crowd – When individuals embrace a new behavior it typically follows a pattern – early adopters, safe followers, and late-comers. To get a change in the group it is imperative that a leader gets a few early adopters on board with a changed behavior. Then have them influence and convince the rest of the group to come and adopt said behavior.
- Tweak the situation – People tend to go with the default option. To influence change, an organization can nudge them and indirectly shape their choices. This can be done by changing the default option which in turn shapes individual behavior.
- Subtract, not just add – Instead of trying to add something in to solve the problems, rather removing the enablers, triggers, and barriers that cause these problems.
- Dare to link carrots and sticks (and follow through) – To motivate individuals to change behavior, offer incentives for both performance related objectives and behavior related objectives.
- Teach and coach well – Developing certain behaviors have a skill dimension. Time is needed for people to develop desired behaviors. As a leader it is important to guide individuals to the desired end result.
- Hire and fire based on behaviors – Some people may or may not be able to or want to adopt these new behaviors and change. Instead leaders should look to bring in people that embody these desired behaviors and are able change.

These tactics can be helpful when faced with resistance from individuals with implementing change into a group. The tactics can be helpful with either implementing a behavioral change among the group or a procedural or managerial change in the group.

=== On an organizational level ===
When trying to change at an organizational level, these tactics developed by Irving Calish and Donald Gamache help companies in trying to enter into new markets and with creating new products.

- Welcome the opportunity for change
- Creating an environment that does not punish mistakes
- Clearly define a growth plan that will enable management to zero in company resources on meaningful targets
- Set realistic criteria for new opportunities
- Avoid trying for short-term financial success
- Remember that a good idea can be identified only after the fact. An idea is "good" only when it is the right fit for the company, its resources, and its goals
- Have a fund of ideas; a choice of opportunities fosters objectivity and helps prevent falling hopelessly in love with one
- Make sure the rewards for success are far greater than the penalties for failure

These tactics implored on an organizational level aid in overcoming resistance and challenges when it comes to change. These tactics are more optimal for when an organization is trying to implement change at an organizational level or trying to enter into a new product space, but still work for other avenues.

=== Avoiding failure ===
Based upon the reasons for failure, there are many actions a leader can take to avoid these failures when it comes to change. They can:

- Create a clearly defined and organized plan
- Communicate this plan effectively to the group
- Define measurable goals
- Create a solid management structure
- Properly manage risk

The antithesis for this is doing the opposite of what causes failure in the first place. Following these steps in combination with the other suggestions will aid in avoiding failure and overcoming challenges. Additionally, to be successful with change, it is imperative to follow the change models to get actions right and avoid failure in the first place.

== Case studies ==
There are many situations in which the change models have been implemented successfully. Two of the following case studies below highlight these examples.

=== Lewin's change-theory example ===
At a Vietnamese University there was a desire to use Lewin's change theory to create a more "effective working environment where lecturers collaborate in a constructive spirit to improve their teaching practices and learning outcomes." To start this process of implementing change, they began by observing how the teachers at this university taught their class, and by giving questionnaires and interviews about how the teachers conducted their jobs. After receiving the feedback about how the teachers conducted their lectures and where they needed to improve, the administration communicated to the teachers how to fix these problems. They began by offering professional seminars as a way for the teachers to improve and refine their knowledge. Additionally the university also brought in professionals that introduced them to alternative ways of teaching. After the teachers had learned this new information they then implemented this into the classes they teach. To monitor the transition and the implementation of these new tactics, the classes were once again observed and feedback was provided through questionnaires and interviews. This data was sent to the administration after the second review and later was organized to show the feedback before and after the changes were implemented in the class room. The data ultimately revealed that after this change was conducted, satisfaction among the students was far greatly improved. This university followed Lewin's model when trying to implement change at their university and the result was a success.

=== Kotter's change-theory example ===
The Centers for Disease Control and Prevention (CDC) conducted an analysis at a federally qualified health center in Kentucky and looked to "improve its delivery of preventive care services, close care gaps, and reduce health disparities among its patient population." With understanding the goal in mind, they utilized Kotter's change theory as a model to attain this goal and implement the change needed at this facility. They began this process to change, by creating a climate for change within the health center. To do this they interviewed employees on how well this facility implemented certain protocols, how high these standards were held, and how well these standards were being enforced. This was done to gain insight on where the organization currently is and where it should be going. Once this knowledge was attained, the organization then implemented the change into the care facility with higher quality standards. After this was complete, the employees were interviewed again and this time the questions shifted to how leadership engaged and enabled the whole organization. This was done to look at how well the organization was implementing the new standards at the care facility. The final phase of questioning was about how the implementation of these standards could have gone better and if there were any unanticipated challenges that came with implementing these standards. These interviews gave the CDC a read on how well the implementation of new health standards at this care facility went well and where they could have improved. This example is one of many of how organizations can use Kotter's change model to correctly implement change.

== See also ==
- Accountability § Individuals within organizations
- Business process reengineering – Business management strategy
- Business transformation – Business strategy
- Change management (ITSM) – IT service management discipline
- Communication and leadership during change
- Einstellung effect – Development of a mechanized state of mind
- Employee engagement – Relationship between an organization and its employees
- Human resource management – Approach to the effective management of people in a company
- Leadership development – Training process to develop leading abilities
- Learning cycle – How people learn from experience
- Industrial and Organizational Psychology – Branch of psychology
- Organization studies – Academic field
- Organizational culture – Customary behaviours in an organization
- Organizational structure – Way in which an organization is structured
- Performance management – Processes to bring output into alignment with goals
- Stakeholder management – Business practice
- Strategic management § Strategy as adapting to change
- Talent management – Aspect of organizational planning
- Training and development – Improving the effectiveness of organizations and the individuals and teams within them
- Transparency (behavior) § Management
- Transtheoretical model – Integrative theory of therapy
- Turnaround management – Strategy to regenerate a company's performance
- Workers' self-management – Form of organizational management
