= The Chicken and the Pig =

Business fable about levels of commitment

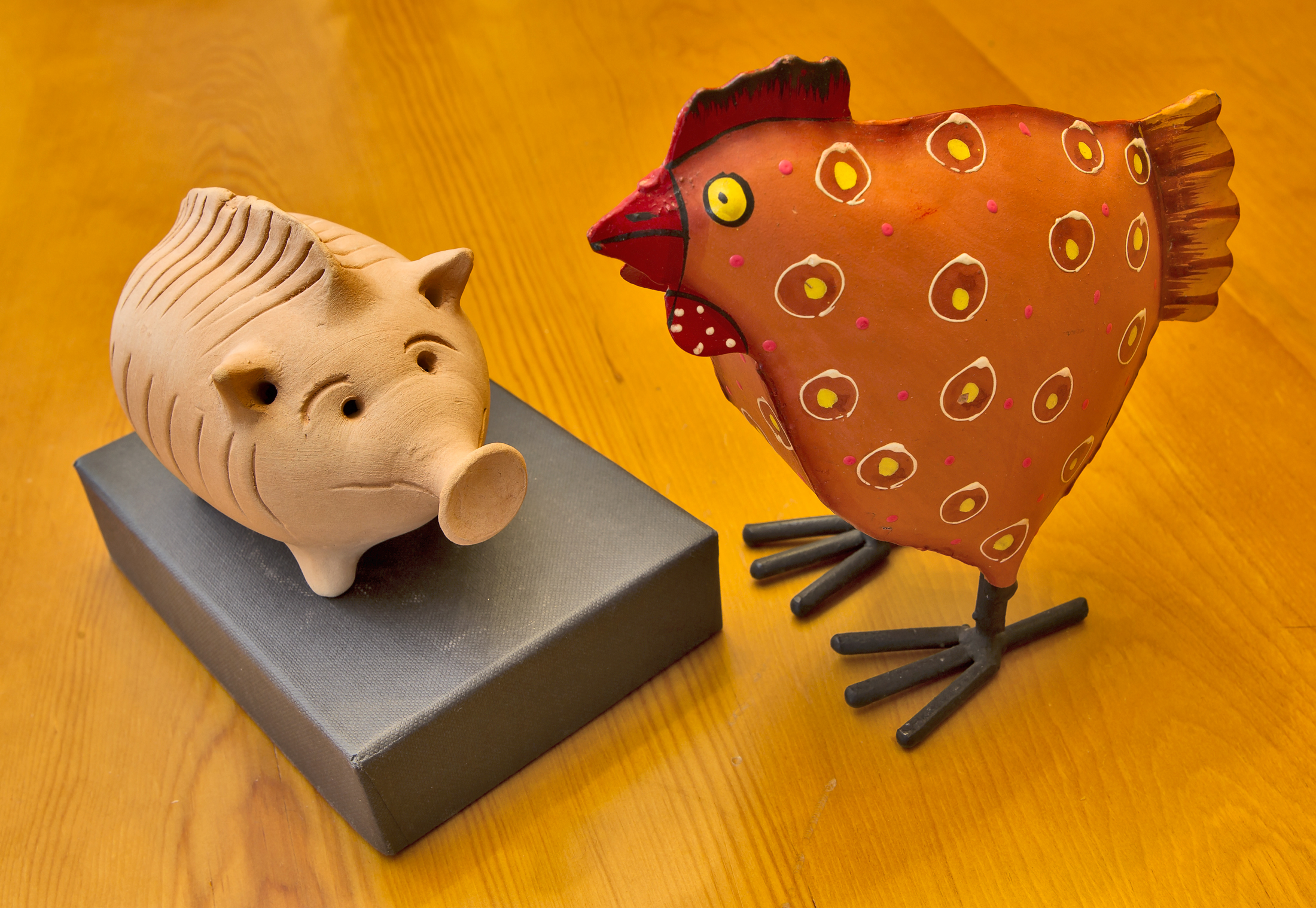

The business fable of The Chicken and the Pig is about commitment to a project or cause. When producing a dish made of eggs with ham or bacon, the pig provides the ham or bacon which requires their sacrifice and the chicken provides the eggs which are not difficult to produce. Thus the pig is really committed to that dish ("has skin in the game"), while the chicken is only involved, yet both are needed to produce the dish.

== Content ==
The fable of the Chicken and the Pig is used to illustrate the differing levels of commitment from project stakeholders involved in a project. The basic fable runs:

A Pig and a Chicken are walking down the road.
The Chicken says: "Hey Pig, I was thinking we should open a restaurant!"
Pig replies: "Hm, maybe, what would we call it?"
The Chicken responds: "How about 'ham-n-eggs'?"
The Pig thinks for a moment and says: "No thanks. I'd be committed, but you'd only be involved."

Sometimes, the story is presented as a riddle:

Question: In a bacon-and-egg breakfast, what's the difference between the Chicken and the Pig?
Answer: The Chicken is involved, but the Pig commits!

== Interpretation and lessons ==
The fable has been used mostly in contexts where a strong team is needed for success, for example in sports or in Agile software development.

=== Agile project management ===
The fable was referenced to define two types of project members by the scrum framework: pigs, who are totally committed to the project and accountable for its outcome, and chickens, who consult on the project and are informed of its progress. This analogy is based upon the pig's ability to provide bacon (a sacrificial offering necessitating the pig's death) versus the chicken's ability to provide eggs (non-sacrificial).

For a Scrum project the Development Team, Product Owners & Scrum Masters are considered as people who are committed to the project while stakeholders, customers and executive management are considered as involved but not committed to the project.

As of 2011, the fable has been removed from the official Scrum framework.

=== Sports ===
The fable also is used as an analogy for levels of commitment to a game, team etc. For example, variations of this quote have been attributed to football coach Mike Leach who said, on the officials in the 2007 Tech-Texas game in Austin: "It's a little like breakfast; you eat ham and eggs. As coaches and players, we're like the ham. You see, the chicken's involved but the pig's committed. We're like the pig, they're like the chicken. They're involved, but everything we have rides on this."

=== Entertainment ===
In Muppet Treasure Island (1996), the character Benjamina Gunn (played by Miss Piggy) has the line, "I'm a pig! I need commitment!"

=== Politics ===
In 2019, Australian Prime Minister Scott Morrison used the fable (attributed to his rugby coach) to make the case that ministers should decide policy, not the public service.
