= Fish! Philosophy =

Technique for creating a positive workplace environment

"Fish!" logo used by ChartHouse Learning

The Fish! Philosophy (styled FISH! Philosophy), modeled after the Pike Place Fish Market, is a business technique that is aimed at creating happy individuals in the workplace. John Christensen created this philosophy in 1998 to improve organizational culture. The central four ideas are: "play", "be there", "make their day" and "choose your attitude".

== History ==
On a visit to Seattle in 1997, John Christensen, owner of ChartHouse Learning, observed fish sellers at Pike Place Fish Market tossing trout and salmon through the air at the market, providing high energy that energized many pedestrians passing by on their lunch breaks. They gave their complete attention to each customer and ensured each had an enjoyable visit.

Christensen noticed that selling fish was repetitive, cold and exhausting. It occurred to him that the fishmongers might not enjoy every part of their job, but they chose to bring joy to how they approached it. They also sold a lot of fish. He asked the fishmongers if he could film them and they agreed. Lee Copeland Gladwin reports that these events led to a film entitled Fish, released in June 1998. John Christensen created the Fish! Philosophy in 1998. From the film, a book was written by Stephen C. Lundin, Harry Paul and John Christensen entitled Fish! A Remarkable Way to Boost Morale and Improve Results. When Christensen and his team examined the footage, they identified four simple practices anyone could apply to their work and life. Karen Boynes asserts that once application of the four concepts—choosing your attitude, play, make someone's day, and be there—starts, the environment changes to welcome positivity into the workplace. ChartHouse Learning called these concepts The Fish! Philosophy.

== Examples ==
A number of organizations have used The Fish! Philosophy language to guide how they approach work.

Stephania Davis reports that the P.T. Barnum pediatric unit at Bridgeport Hospital applied the four beliefs to the team to help ease the patients' and families' stay. Each principle was assigned to a group of the pediatric team that Ms. Gomez, charge nurse of the unit, had divided. The feedback from the parents after the change was very promising. Ms. Gomez has stated, "They [the employees] like coming to work again...".

Wild Wadi Water Park, in Dubai, United Arab Emirates, uses the video and principles in the socialization process of each of its new hires. In 2004, the water-park won the SWIM Award for their Front Line Employee Training Program using "The Fish Philosophy".

Customers such as Bill Bean are well aware of when the energy in a business is negative. In an article, he wrote for "The Recorder" he talked about how when he usually visits Ontario Ministry of Health the atmosphere is very dark and cold. On his last visit, the team excitedly welcomed him into the office to renew his Ontario Health Card. The sudden change in staff attitude was due to implementing the Fish! philosophy in daily operations.

Charlotte Tucker believes Industrial Piping Systems has fully embraced the Fish! ideology, as fish replicas hang from the ceilings and are attached to walls to prove it. Christine Wardrop, president of IPS, describes the idea by saying, "They're the rules of Life... You should focus on them and keep them in your mind".

In April 2000, the Ford Motor Company decided to incorporate the Fish Philosophy in their training programs. This decision came about as a result of the lack of motivation in a certain division of the company.

== K-12 education use ==
Educators may use The Fish! Philosophy to build supportive relationships with students and help students practice personal responsibility. Both are keys in creating effective classrooms. The Fish! Philosophy is thought to spark creativity in the schoolhouse and the workplace.

== Criticism ==
In his book Organization Theory: A Libertarian Perspective, Kevin Carson calls Fish! "vile" and a "lesson from the powerful to the powerless", adding:

To grasp just how presumptuous Fish! really is, just try a thought experiment: imagine management's reaction if the circumstances were reversed. Imagine the bosses' reaction if you and your coworkers matter-of-factly announced that, henceforth, you would be working at a slower pace for the same amount of money, or that you would be receiving a higher hourly wage. Imagine telling the boss "you can't do anything about these changes, but you can choose to have a good attitude about them!" My guess is your boss would demonstrate in short order that he does have control over events, and that it's not his attitude that has to be adjusted. That's because, while you may be powerless, your bosses most certainly are not.

This asymmetrical power relationship is implicit in Fish! Philosophy. And you'd better believe that the people who push it are fully aware of their agenda. [...] They are the ones who do things. We are the ones that things are done to. Learn to enjoy it, or else. That's the message of Fish! Philosophy.
