= Management fad =

Pejorative term for organizational practice

Management fad is a term used to characterize a change in philosophy or operations implemented by a business or institution. It amounts to a fad in the management culture of an institution.

The term is subjective and tends to be used in a pejorative sense, as it implies that such a change is being implemented (often by management on its employees, with little or no input from them) solely because it is (at the time) "popular" within managerial circles, and not necessarily due to any real need for organizational change. The term further implies that once the underlying philosophy is no longer "popular", it will be replaced by the newest "popular" idea, in the same manner and for the same reason as the previous idea.

Alternatively, the pejorative use of the term expresses a cynical belief that the organization desires change that would be resisted by the rank and file if presented directly, so it is dressed up in a dramatic change of management style, to remain in place only as long as it serves the underlying agenda.

Several authors have argued that new management ideas should be subject to greater critical analysis, and for the need for greater conceptual awareness of new ideas by managers. Authors Leonard J. Ponzi and Michael Koenig believe that a key determinant of whether any management idea is a "management fad" is the number and timing of published articles on the idea. In their research, Ponzi and Koenig argue that once an idea has been discussed for around 3–5 years, if after this time the number of articles on the idea in a given year decreases significantly (similar to the right-hand side of a bell curve), then the idea is most likely a "management fad".

== Origins ==
Consultants and even academics have developed new management ideas. Journalists may popularize new concepts.

Like other fashions, trends in management thought may grow, decline, and recur. Judy Wajcman sees the human relations movement of the 1930s as a precursor of the later fashion of "transformational management".

== Examples ==
The following management theories and practices appeared on a 2004 list of management fashions and fads compiled by Adrian Furnham, who arranged them in rough chronological order by their date of appearance, 1950s to 1990s:

- Management by objectives
- Matrix management
- Theory Z
- One-minute management
- Management by wandering around
- Total quality management
- Business process reengineering
- Delayering
- Empowerment
- 360-degree feedback

Other theories and practices which observers have tagged as fads include:

- Six Sigma
- Knowledge management
- DevOps
- Transformational leadership
- Agile software development
- Enterprise architecture frameworks
- Thriving on chaos
- Open-plan offices
- Consensus management
- Best practice

== See also ==
- Philosophy of business
- Organizational performance
- Management consulting: Criticism section
- Dilbert
- Hype cycle
- Business fable
