= GRADE (CERN research programme) =

GRADE (Generic pre-R&D at IdeaSquare) is a CERN research programme. The programme was approved by the CERN Research Board in December 2015.

== GRADE Research Programme ==
LHC experiments
Experiment	Contact person	Description	Status	Link
GR1 (SIMPLE)	Markus Yrjo Nordberg	Silicon photo multipliers for generic detector R&D	Completed April 2019	Grey Book
GR02 (TT-PET)	Giuseppe Iacobucci	Thin time-of-flight PET project		Grey Book
GR03 (AUGMENT)	Olga Beltramello	Generic R&D and augmented reality techniques	Completed December 2019	Grey Book
GR04 (HEALTH)	Marco Silari	Detectors for health and safety		Grey Book

== Reletated web sites and further reading ==
- IdeaSquare
- IdeaSquare and GRADE Advisory Board
- Challenge Based Innovation
- CERN IdeaSquare Journal of Experimental Innovation
