= Employee research =

Finding out employees' views

In organizational development (OD), employee research involves the use of surveys, focus groups and other data-gathering methods to find out the attitudes, opinions and sentiments of members of an organization.

== See also ==
- Employee survey
- Interviewing
- Focus group
- Customer satisfaction
