= The One Minute Manager =

1982 book by Blanchard and Johnson

- Author: Ken Blanchard; Spencer Johnson
- Language: English
- Genre: Business / Self-help / Motivational
- Publisher: William Morrow & Co
- Publication date: 1982
- Publication place: United States
- Pages: 112
- ISBN: 978-0-688-01429-2

The One Minute Manager is a short book by Ken Blanchard and Spencer Johnson. The brief volume tells a story, recounting three techniques of an effective manager: one minute goals, one minute praisings, and one minute reprimands. Each of these takes only a minute but is purportedly of lasting benefit. Shortly after publication the book became a New York Times bestseller. The One Minute Manager has sold 15 million copies and been translated into 47 languages.

== Content ==
If you were the manager of a company and given a minute, what would you do? In the story The One Minute Manager, describe a motivated young man is trying to find an effective manager. But after several searches, the results were always empty and disappointing. One day, he heard about a manager known as The One Minute Manager, and he visited the "one-minute manager" with suspicion, and finally realized that the true meaning of management comes from three secrets:

Secret type	Narrative
One minute goals	If you want to achieve great results for an organization, the first step is to set clear goals and tasks. Communicating these tasks, benchmarks, and results to an organization's employees is the most critical component of leading an organization in the right direction. 99% of problems in organizations are preventable, as long as the communication between the manager and staff is honest, open, and early. Keeping in mind the 80/20 principle (80 percent of the result are driven by 20 percent of the tasks), every staff member should have his/her responsibilities and consequences established upfront and discussed until both parties understand their responsibilities. Each of these goals should be less than 250 words and can be read daily within one minute. This gives them of sense of ownership and knows that they are trusted. Once both parties have a good understanding of what is expected and what the results should look like, it should be recorded on no more than a single page. From then on, the staff member knows what is expected of them and will rarely come to the manager with problems – they know they are hired to solve the organizational problems.
One minute praisings	Manager should catch staff when they're doing something right and recognize them for it. After praising the staff, take a slight pause to let the compliment sink in and give the person pat on the back or give them a hand to congratulate them on doing such a great job.
One minute reprimands (One minute redirect)	On the opposite end of praise, organizations also have reprimands(redirect). Just as organizations are taking a few moments to praise, but the reprimands (redirect) happens at about the same time instead of longer. This is important because the staff may begin to think they have more shortcomings than strengths, and that will never end well. During the 'one minute redirect,' we want to catch unproductive or negative behavior immediately, and explain to the employee the consequences and to emphasize the issue with the work, not the person. Note: A problem always has a solution. If organizations can't identify the solution, then don't waste time talking about the "problems". Don't tell someone what they're doing wrong until organizations can tell them what they should be doing right.

== Sequels ==
The book was followed by a sequel, Leadership and the One Minute Manager: Increasing Effectiveness Through Situational Leadership II, by Ken Blanchard, Patricia Zigarmi and Drea Zigarmi, which laid out Blanchard's SLII concept.

== New edition ==
An updated edition of the book, The New One Minute Manager, was published in 2015. In the new edition, the third technique, the one minute reprimand, was changed to the one minute redirect.

== Reception ==
The One Minute Manager has been widely praised for its universal appeal and for reducing esoteric management theory into simple, actionable techniques. Time magazine cited it as one of the 25 Most Influential Business Management Books.

The concept has also been called a management fad, and derivative of management by objectives, itself derived from the business planning literature. One critic called it "the executive equivalent of paper-training your dog". In 2001 the Wall Street Journal ran an article noting that The One Minute Manager bore a resemblance to an article written by Blanchard's former colleague, Arthur Elliot Carlisle.
