= Spencer Johnson (writer) =

American writer

- Born: November 24, 1938; Watertown, South Dakota, US
- Died: July 3, 2017 (aged 78); San Diego, California, US
- Education: University of Southern California; Royal College of Surgeons in Ireland
- Occupation: Writer
- Notable work: Who Moved My Cheese?, ValueTale series
- Spouse: Lesley
- Website: spencerjohnson.com

Patrick Spencer Johnson (November 24, 1938 – July 3, 2017) was an American writer. He was known for the ValueTales series of children's books, and for his 1998 self-help book Who Moved My Cheese?, which recurred on the New York Times Bestseller list, on the Publishers Weekly Hardcover nonfiction list. Johnson was the chairman of Spencer Johnson Partners.

== Biography ==
Spencer Johnson was born in Watertown, South Dakota, graduated from Notre Dame High School of Sherman Oaks, California, in 1957, received a Bachelor of Arts degree in psychology from the University of Southern California in 1963, and his medical degree from the Royal College of Surgeons in Ireland. Johnson lived in Hawaii and New Hampshire. He was employed by the Harvard Business School and the John F. Kennedy School of Government. He died in San Diego on July 3, 2017, at the age of 78.

== Notable works ==
Johnson wrote the book "Yes" or "No": The Guide to Better Decisions (1992).

He co-authored the One Minute Manager series of books with management writer Ken Blanchard, though each author has added their own books to the series.

Johnson's last book, Out of the Maze, is a sequel to Who Moved My Cheese that references Johnson's struggle with cancer (which ultimately ended with his death in 2017) and was published posthumously in 2018.

Johnson's books have been translated into twenty-six languages.

== See also ==
- Business fable

== Bibliography ==
- The ValueTale of Elizabeth Fry: the value of kindness (La Jolla, California: Value Communications, 1975)
- The ValueTale of the Wright brothers: the value of patience (La Jolla, California: Value Communications, 1975)
- The Valuetale of Louis Pasteur: the value of believing in yourself (La Jolla, California: Value Communications, 1975)
- The value of believing in yourself: the story of Louis Pasteur (La Jolla, California: Value Communications, 1976)
- The value of patience: the story of the Wright brothers (La Jolla, California: Value Communications, 1976)
- The value of humor: the story of Will Rogers (La Jolla, California: Value Communications, 1976)
- The value of kindness: the story of Elizabeth Fry (La Jolla, California: Value Communications, 1976)
- The value of imagination: the story of Charles Dickens (La Jolla, California: Value Communications, 1977)
- The value of courage: the story of Jackie Robinson (La Jolla, California: Value Communications, 1977)
- The value of curiosity: the story of Christopher Columbus (La Jolla, California: Value Communications, 1977)
- The value of saving: the story of Benjamin Franklin (La Jolla, California: Value Communications, 1978)
- The value of sharing: the story of the Mayo brothers (La Jolla, California: Value Communications, 1978)
- The value of understanding: the story of Margaret Mead (La Jolla, California: Value Communications, 1979)
- The value of dedication: the story of Albert Schweitzer (La Jolla, California: Value Communications, 1979)
- The value of fairness: the tale of Nellie Bly (with Ann Donegan Johnson, Emerson Johnson and Steve Pileggi) (Orem, Utah: ValueTales Publishing, 2007)
- The value of fantasy: the story of Hans Christian Andersen (La Jolla, California: Value Communications, 1979)
- The value of honesty: the story of Confucius (La Jolla, California: Value Communications, 1979)
- The One Minute Manager(with Ken Blanchard, William Morrow & Co, 1982) ISBN 0-06-008579-7
- The One Minute Father: the quickest way for you to help your children learn to like themselves and want to behave themselves (New York: W. Morrow, 1983)
- The One Minute Mother: the quickest way for you to help your children learn to like themselves and want to behave themselves (New York: Morrow, 1983)
- The Precious Present (Garden City, N.Y.: Doubleday, 1984)
- The One Minute $ales Person: The Quickest Way to Sell People on Yourself, Your Services, Products, or Ideas--at Work and in Life (New York: W. Morrow, 1984)
- One Minute for Myself (New York: W. Morrow, 1985) [retitled One Minute for Yourself]
- The One Minute Teacher: How to Teach Others to Teach Themselves (with Constance Johnson) (New York: W. Morrow, 1986)
- "Yes" or "No": The Guide to Better Decisions (New York, NY: HarperCollins Publishers, 1992)
- Who Moved My Cheese?: An Amazing Way to Deal with Change in Your Work and in Your Life (New York, Putnam, 1998)
- The Cheese Experience: an amazing way to deal with change in your work and in your life ... presenters handbook to direct people through the maze (with Spencer Johnson Company. (Salt Lake City, Utah: Spencer Johnson Co., 1999)
- An A-mazing Change Profile: discovering who you are and how you can enjoy more success with less stress in changing times (Salt Lake City, Utah: Spencer Johnson Co., 2000)
- Paradoxical Commandments: finding personal meaning in a crazy world (with Kent M. Keith) (London: Hodder & Stoughton, 2002)
- Who Moved My Cheese? For Teens: an a-mazing way to change and win! (New York: G.P. Putnam's Sons, 2002)
- The Present: The Secret to Enjoying Your Work And Life, Now! (New York, Doubleday, 2003)
- The Value of Learning: the tale of Marie Curie (with Ann Donegan Johnson) (Orem, Utah: Candle Publishing, 2007)
- The Value of Friendship: the tale of Jane Addams (with Ann Donegan Johnson) (Orem, Utah: Candle Publishing, 2007)
- The Value of Helping: the tale of Harriet Tubman (with Ann Donegan Johnson) (Orem, Utah: Candle Publishing, 2007)
- The Value of Respect: the tale of Abraham Lincoln (with Ann Donegan Johnson) (Orem, Utah: Candle Publishing, 2007)
- Peaks and Valleys: Making Good And Bad Times Work For You--At Work And In Life (New York: Atria Books, 2009)
