= ValueTales =

Series of children's books

ValueTales is a series of 43 simple biographical children's books published primarily by Value Communications, Inc. in La Jolla, California. Dr. Spencer Johnson and Ann Donegan Johnson wrote them and they are illustrated by Stephen Pileggi. Each book has a simplified and semi-fictionalized biography of a historical figure as an allegory, illustrating the value of a characteristic. Each volume is a white pictorial glossy hardback book around 60 pages long with a brightly colored cartoon of the figure, along with some anthropomorphic item or animal which narrates the subject's life throughout the book.

The title of each book is The Value of x: The story of y, where x is the characteristic exemplified and y is the exemplary person (i.e. The Value of Determination: The Story of Helen Keller). Early editions of the books use a different format: The Valuetale of y: The value of x. The first edition of the Helen Keller book is called The ValueTale of Helen Keller : the value of determination. The books were quite popular in homes, elementary school libraries, pediatric offices, and Sunday schools across North America. Most are out of print. In October 2010, Simon & Schuster Children's Books published an anthology containing five of the ValueTales books, with new illustrations by Dan Andreasen.

== Books ==
Value	Subject	Sex	Author	Publication Date	ISBN	Notes
Adventure	Sacagawea	F	Ann Donegan Johnson	1981 February 1	0-916392-59-7	
Believing in Yourself	Louis Pasteur	M	Spencer Johnson, Steve Pileggi	1977 March	0-916392-06-6; 0-916392-01-5	a.k.a. Believing
Boldness	Captain Cook	M	Johnson, Ann Donegan Johnson	1986 June	0-7172-8188-4	
Caring	Eleanor Roosevelt	F	Ann D. Johnson, Steve Pileggi (Illustrator)	1977 July	0-916392-11-2	
Charity	Paul-Emile Léger	M	Ann Donegan Johnson	1983	0-7172-1884-8	
Commitment	Jacques Cousteau	M	Ann Donegan Johnson	1998	0-7172-8820-X	
Compassion	Florence Nightingale	F	Ann Donegan Johnson	1987 July	0-7172-8482-4	
Conviction	Cesar Chavez	M	Ann Donegan Johnson	1995	0-7172-8482-4	
Courage	Jackie Robinson	M	Spencer Johnson	1977 August	0-916392-12-0	
Creativity	Thomas Edison	M	Ann Donegan Johnson, Steve Pileggi (Illustrator)	1984 November	0-916392-72-4	
Curiosity	Christopher Columbus	M	Spencer Johnson	1977 November	0-916392-13-9	
Dedication	Albert Schweitzer	M	Spencer Johnson, Steve Pileggi	1980 February	0-916392-44-9	
Determination	Helen Keller	F	Ann Donegan Johnson	1977 March	0-916392-02-3; 0-916392-07-4	
Dignity	Arthur Ashe	M	Ann Donegan Johnson	1994	0-7172-8339-9	
Discipline	Alexander Graham Bell	M	Ann D. Johnson, Steven Pileggi (Illustrator)	1985 April	0-7172-1887-2; 0-7172-8176-0	a.k.a. Self-Discipline, June 1985
Facing a Challenge	Terry Fox	M	Ann Donegan Johnson	1985 November 1	0-7172-8134-5	
Fairness	Nellie Bly	F	Ann Donegan Johnson	1977 December	0-916392-16-3	
Fantasy	Hans Christian Andersen	M	Spencer Johnson, Steve Pileggi	1980 February	0-916392-43-0	
Foresight	Thomas Jefferson	M	Ann Donegan Johnson, Steve Pileggi	1980 February	0-916392-42-2	
Friendship	Jane Addams	F	Ann Donegan Johnson, Steve Pileggi (Illustrator)	1980 February	0-916392-45-7	
Giving	Beethoven	M	Ann Donegan Johnson	1979 June	0-916392-34-1	
Helping	Harriet Tubman	F	Ann Donegan Johnson, Steve Pileggi	1980 February	0-916392-41-4	
Honesty	Confucius	M	Steve Pileggi, Spencer, M.D. Johnson	1979 June	0-916392-36-8	
Humility	Mother Teresa	F	Ann Donegan Johnson	1993	0-7172-8316-X	
Humor	Will Rogers	M	Spencer Johnson, Steve Pileggi	1977 March	0-916392-05-8	
Imagination	Charles Dickens	M	Spencer Johnson, Steve Pileggi	1977 December	0-916392-15-5	
Imagination	Jim Henson	M	Ann Donegan Johnson	1992	978-0-7172-8253-1	
Kindness	Elizabeth Fry	F	Spencer Johnson, Steve Pileggi	1977 March	0-916392-09-0; 0-916392-04-X	
Laughter	Lucille Ball	F	Ann Donegan Johnson	1990 May	0-7172-8217-1	
Leadership	Winston Churchill	M	Ann Donegan Johnson, Steve Pileggi (Illustrator)	1989 August	0-86679-046-2	
Learning	Marie Curie	F	Spencer Johnson, Ann D. Johnson	1979 June	0-686-98175-8; 0-916392-18-X	
Love	Johnny Appleseed	M	Ann Donegan Johnson, Steve Pileggi	1979 June	0-916392-35-X	
Optimism	Amelia Earhart	F	Ann Donegan Johnson	1997	0-7172-8780-7	
Overcoming Adversity	Wilma Rudolph	F	Ann Donegan Johnson	1996	0-7172-8731-9	
Patience	Wright Brothers	M	Spencer Johnson, Steve Pileggi	1977 March	0-916392-08-2	
Positive Attitude	Michael Landon	M	Ann Donegan Johnson	1992 January 1	0-7172-8263-5	
Respect	Abraham Lincoln	M	Ann Donegan Johnson, Steve Pileggi	1977 June	0-916392-14-7	
Responsibility	Ralph Bunche	M	Ann Donegan Johnson	1978 November	0-916392-29-5	
Saving	Benjamin Franklin	M	Spencer Johnson, Steve Pileggi	1978 August	0-916392-17-1	
Sharing	Mayo Brothers	M	Spencer Johnson, Steve Pileggi	1978 November	0-916392-28-7	
Tenacity	Maurice Richard	M	Ann Donegan Johnson, Steve Pileggi	1984 June	978-0-7172-8143-5	
Truth and Trust	Cochise	M	Spencer Johnson, Steve Pileggi	1980 January	0-307-69957-9; 0-916392-10-4	
Understanding	Margaret Mead	F	Spencer Johnson, Steve Pileggi (Illustrator)	1979 June	0-916392-37-6	
