= John Kotter =

Author of books about leadership

John Paul Kotter
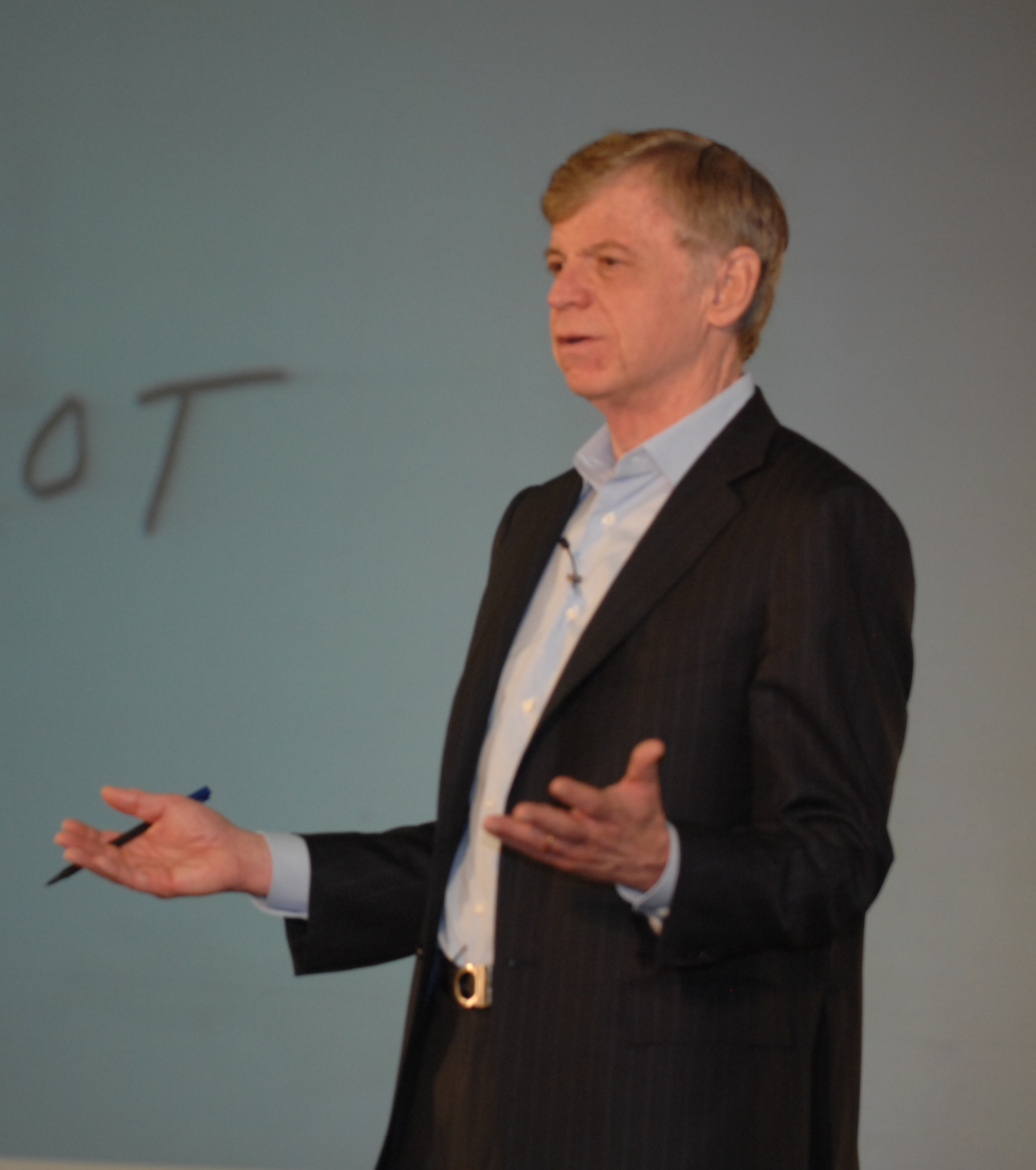
- Born: February 25, 1947 (age 79); San Diego, California, U.S
- Education: Massachusetts Institute of Technology; Harvard Business School
- Occupations: author, educator, management consultant, scholar
- Spouse: Nancy Dearman
- Website: www.kotterinc.com

John Paul Kotter is the Konosuke Matsushita Professor of Leadership, Emeritus at the Harvard Business School, an author, and the founder of Kotter International, a management consulting firm based in Seattle and Boston. He is a thought leader in business, leadership, and change.

== Personal life ==
Kotter lives in Boston, Massachusetts with his wife, Nancy Dearman. They have two children, Caroline and Jonathan.

== Career ==
John Kotter is an emeritus from Harvard Business School where he started teaching in 1972. He is the founder of Kotter International, and started his business in 2010 with locations in Cambridge Massachusetts and Seattle Washington. He currently serves as Chairman of Kotter International alongside CEO, Rick Western, Chief Commercial Officer, Kathy Gersch, Chief Financial Officer, Tanya Kruger and many more.

Kotter is also an author, speaker, and entrepreneur in the lines of business and leadership.

=== Successful change ===
In Leading Change (1996), and subsequently in The Heart of Change (2002), Kotter describes an eight stage model of successful change in which he seeks to support managers to lead change and to understand how people accept, engage with and maintain successful organisational change. The eight stages or steps include the creation of "a sense of urgency" and the use of "short-term wins".

Short-term wins, within a 6–18 month window, are considered necessary because "[an] organization has to realize some benefits from [a] change effort to maintain stakeholder commitment". Kotter asserts that to be useful or influential, short-term wins need to be "visible and unambiguous" as well as "closely related to the change effort". Arguing against a belief that there is a "trade-off" between wins in the short-term and wins in the long-term, Kotter argues from experience that both are achievable.

== Written work ==
Kotter is the author of 21 books, as listed below. 12 of these have been business bestsellers and two of which are overall New York Times bestsellers.

- Kotter, John P. (1974). Mayors In Action. John Wiley & Sons Inc. ISBN 047150540-4.
- Kotter, John P. (1979). Power in Management. Amacom Books. ISBN 0814455077.
- Kotter, John P. (1979). Organization - Texts, Cases, and Readings on the Management of Organizational Design and Change. R. D. Irwin. ISBN 0256022267.
- Kotter, John P. (1986). The General Managers. Free Press. ISBN 0029182301.
- Kotter, John P. (1988). The Leadership Factor. Free Press. ISBN 0029183316.
- Kotter, John P. (1990). A Force for Change. Free Press. ISBN 0029184657.
- Kotter, John P. (1991) [1978]. Self Assessment & Career Development. Prentice Hall. ISBN 0138031487.
- Kotter, John P. (1995). The New Rules. Free Press. ISBN 0029175860.
- Kotter, John P. (1996). Leading Change. Harvard Business School Press. ISBN 978-0-87584-747-4.
- Kotter, John P. (1997). Matsushita Leadership: Lessons from the 20th Century's Most Remarkable Entrepreneur. New York: The Free Press. ISBN 9780684834603. OCLC 35620432.
- Kotter, John P. (1999). John P. Kotter on What Leaders Really Do.
- Kotter, John P. (2002). The Heart of Change.
- Kotter, John P. (2006). Our Iceberg is Melting.
- Kotter, John P. (2008) [1985]. Power and Influence. Free Press. ISBN 978-1439146798.
- Kotter, John P. (2008). A Sense of Urgency. United States: Harvard Business School Publishing. ISBN 978-1-4221-7971-0.
- Kotter, John P. (2008). Managing Your Boss. ISBN 9781422122884.
- Kotter, John P. (2010). Buy In. ISBN 9781422157299.
- Kotter, John P. (2011) [1992]. Corporate Culture and Performance. Free Press. ISBN 978-1451655322.
- Kotter, John P. (2014). Accelerate: Building Strategic Agility for a Faster-Moving World. p. 224. ISBN 978-1625271747.
- Kotter, John P. (2016). That's Not How We Do It Here!: A Story about How Organizations Rise and Fall--and Can Rise Again. p. 176. ISBN 978-0399563942.
- Kotter, John P. (2021). CHANGE: How Organizations Achieve Hard-to-Imagine Results Despite Uncertain and Volatile Times. p. 240. ISBN 978-1119815846.

== See also ==
- Rosabeth Moss Kanter
- Peter Senge
- Chris Argyris
- Edgar Schein
- Henry Mintzberg
- James MacGregor Burns
- Warren Bennis
