= Group dynamics =

System of behaviors within or between social groups

Group dynamics is a system of behaviors and psychological processes occurring within a social group (intragroup dynamics), or between social groups (intergroup dynamics). The study of group dynamics can be useful in understanding decision-making behavior, tracking the spread of diseases in society, creating effective therapy techniques, and following the emergence and popularity of new ideas and technologies. These applications of the field are studied in psychology, sociology, anthropology, political science, epidemiology, education, social work, leadership studies, business and managerial studies, as well as communication studies.

== History ==
The history of group dynamics (or group processes) has a consistent, underlying premise: "the whole is greater than the sum of its parts." A social group is an entity that has qualities which cannot be understood just by studying the individuals that make up the group. In 1924, Gestalt psychologist Max Wertheimer proposed "There are entities where the behaviour of the whole cannot be derived from its individual elements nor from the way these elements fit together; rather the opposite is true: the properties of any of the parts are determined by the intrinsic structural laws of the whole".

As a field of study, group dynamics has roots in both psychology and sociology. Wilhelm Wundt (1832–1920), credited as the founder of experimental psychology, had a particular interest in the psychology of communities, which he believed possessed phenomena (human language, customs, and religion) that could not be described through a study of the individual. On the sociological side, Émile Durkheim (1858–1917), who was influenced by Wundt, also recognized collective phenomena, such as public knowledge. Other key theorists include Gustave Le Bon (1841–1931) who believed that crowds possessed a 'racial unconscious' with primitive, aggressive, and antisocial instincts, and William McDougall, who believed in a 'group mind,' which had a distinct existence born from the interaction of individuals.

Eventually, the social psychologist Kurt Lewin (1890–1947) coined the term group dynamics to describe the positive and negative forces within groups of people. In 1945, he established The Group Dynamics Research Center at the Massachusetts Institute of Technology, the first institute devoted explicitly to the study of group dynamics. Throughout his career, Lewin was focused on how the study of group dynamics could be applied to real-world, social issues.

Increasingly, research has applied evolutionary psychology principles to group dynamics. As humans' social environments became more complex, they acquired adaptations by way of group dynamics that enhance survival. Examples include mechanisms for dealing with status, reciprocity, identifying cheaters, ostracism, altruism, group decision, leadership, and intergroup relations.

== Key theorists ==
=== Gustave Le Bon ===
Gustave Le Bon was a French social psychologist whose seminal study, The Crowd: A Study of the Popular Mind (1896) led to the development of group psychology.

=== William McDougall ===
The British psychologist William McDougall in his work The Group Mind (1920) researched the dynamics of groups of various sizes and degrees of organization.

=== Sigmund Freud ===
In Group Psychology and the Analysis of the Ego, (1922), Sigmund Freud based his preliminary description of group psychology on Le Bon's work, but went on to develop his own, original theory, related to what he had begun to elaborate in Totem and Taboo. Theodor Adorno reprised Freud's essay in 1951 with his Freudian Theory and the Pattern of Fascist Propaganda, and said that "It is not an overstatement if we say that Freud, though he was hardly interested in the political phase of the problem, clearly foresaw the rise and nature of fascist mass movements in purely psychological categories."

=== Jacob L. Moreno ===
Jacob L. Moreno was a psychiatrist, dramatist, philosopher and theoretician who coined the term "group psychotherapy" in the early 1930s and was highly influential at the time.

=== Kurt Lewin ===
Kurt Lewin (1943, 1948, 1951) is commonly identified as the founder of the movement to study groups scientifically. He coined the term group dynamics to describe the way groups and individuals act and react to changing circumstances.

=== William Schutz ===
William Schutz (1958, 1966) looked at interpersonal relations as stage-developmental, inclusion (am I included?), control (who is top dog here?), and affection (do I belong here?). Schutz sees groups resolving each issue in turn in order to be able to progress to the next stage.

Conversely, a struggling group can devolve to an earlier stage, if unable to resolve outstanding issues at its present stage. Schutz referred to these group dynamics as "the interpersonal underworld," group processes which are largely unseen and un-acknowledged, as opposed to "content" issues, which are nominally the agenda of group meetings.

=== Wilfred Bion ===
Wilfred Bion (1961) studied group dynamics from a psychoanalytic perspective, and stated that he was much influenced by Wilfred Trotter for whom he worked at University College Hospital London, as did another key figure in the Psychoanalytic movement, Ernest Jones. He discovered several mass group processes which involved the group as a whole adopting an orientation which, in his opinion, interfered with the ability of a group to accomplish the work it was nominally engaged in. Bion's experiences are reported in his published books, especially Experiences in Groups. The Tavistock Institute has further developed and applied the theory and practices developed by Bion.

=== Bruce Tuckman ===
Bruce Tuckman (1965) proposed the four-stage model called Tuckman's Stages for a group. Tuckman's model states that the ideal group decision-making process should occur in four stages:

- Forming (pretending to get on or get along with others)
- Storming (letting down the politeness barrier and trying to get down to the issues even if tempers flare up)
- Norming (getting used to each other and developing trust and productivity)
- Performing (working in a group to a common goal on a highly efficient and cooperative basis)

Tuckman later added a fifth stage for the dissolution of a group called adjourning. (Adjourning may also be referred to as mourning, i.e. mourning the adjournment of the group). This model refers to the overall pattern of the group, but of course individuals within a group work in different ways. If distrust persists, a group may never even get to the norming stage.

=== M. Scott Peck ===
M. Scott Peck developed stages for larger-scale groups (i.e., communities) which are similar to Tuckman's stages of group development. Peck describes the stages of a community as:

- Pseudo-community
- Chaos
- Emptiness
- True Community

Communities may be distinguished from other types of groups, in Peck's view, by the need for members to eliminate barriers to communication in order to be able to form true community. Examples of common barriers are: expectations and preconceptions; prejudices; ideology, counterproductive norms, theology and solutions; the need to heal, convert, fix or solve and the need to control. A community is born when its members reach a stage of "emptiness" or peace.

=== Richard Hackman ===
Richard Hackman developed a synthetic, research-based model for designing and managing work groups. Hackman suggested that groups are successful when they satisfy internal and external clients, develop capabilities to perform in the future, and when members find meaning and satisfaction in the group. Hackman proposed five conditions that increase the chance that groups will be successful. These include:

1. Being a real team: which results from having a shared task, clear boundaries which clarify who is inside or outside of the group, and stability in group membership.
2. Compelling direction: which results from a clear, challenging, and consequential goal.
3. Enabling structure: which results from having tasks which have variety, a group size that is not too large, talented group members who have at least moderate social skill, and strong norms that specify appropriate behaviour.
4. Supportive context: which occurs in groups nested in larger groups (e.g. companies). In companies, supportive contexts involves a) reward systems that reward performance and cooperation (e.g. group based rewards linked to group performance), b) an educational system that develops member skills, c) an information and materials system that provides the needed information and raw materials (e.g. computers).
5. Expert coaching: which occurs on the rare occasions when group members feel they need help with task or interpersonal issues. Hackman emphasizes that many team leaders are overbearing and undermine group effectiveness.

== Intragroup dynamics ==
Intragroup dynamics (also referred to as in-group, within-group, or commonly just ‘group dynamics’) are the underlying processes that give rise to a set of norms, roles, relations, and common goals that characterize a particular social group. Examples of groups include religious, political, military, and environmental groups, sports teams, work groups, and therapy groups. Amongst the members of a group, there is a state of interdependence, through which the behaviours, attitudes, opinions, and experiences of each member are collectively influenced by the other group members. In many fields of research, there is an interest in understanding how group dynamics influence individual behaviour, attitudes, and opinions.

The dynamics of a particular group depend on how one defines the boundaries of the group. Often, there are distinct subgroups within a more broadly defined group. For example, one could define U.S. residents ('Americans') as a group, but could also define a more specific set of U.S. residents (for example, 'Americans in the South'). For each of these groups, there are distinct dynamics that can be discussed. Notably, on this very broad level, the study of group dynamics is similar to the study of culture. For example, there are group dynamics in the U.S. South that sustain a culture of honor, which is associated with norms of toughness, honour-related violence, and self-defence.

=== Group formation ===
Group formation starts with a psychological bond between individuals. The social cohesion approach suggests that group formation comes out of bonds of interpersonal attraction. In contrast, the social identity approach suggests that a group starts when a collection of individuals perceive that they share some social category (smokers, nurses, students, hockey players), and that interpersonal attraction only secondarily enhances the connection between individuals. Additionally, from the social identity approach, group formation involves both identifying with some individuals and explicitly not identifying with others. So to say, a level of psychological distinctiveness is necessary for group formation. Through interaction, individuals begin to develop group norms, roles, and attitudes which define the group, and are internalized to influence behaviour.

Emergent groups arise from a relatively spontaneous process of group formation. For example, in response to a natural disaster, an emergent response group may form. These groups are characterized as having no preexisting structure (e.g. group membership, allocated roles) or prior experience working together. Yet, these groups still express high levels of interdependence and coordinate knowledge, resources, and tasks.

=== Joining groups ===
Joining a group is determined by a number of different factors, including an individual's personal traits; gender; social motives such as need for affiliation, need for power, and need for intimacy; attachment style; and prior group experiences. Groups can offer some advantages to its members that would not be possible if an individual decided to remain alone, including gaining social support in the forms of emotional support, instrumental support, and informational support. It also offers friendship, potential new interests, learning new skills, and enhancing self esteem. However, joining a group may also cost an individual time, effort, and personal resources as they may conform to social pressures and strive to reap the benefits that may be offered by the group.

The Minimax Principle is a part of social exchange theory that states that people will join and remain in a group that can provide them with the maximum amount of valuable rewards while at the same time, ensuring the minimum amount of costs to themselves. However, this does not necessarily mean that a person will join a group simply because the reward/cost ratio seems attractive. According to Howard Kelley and John Thibaut, a group may be attractive to us in terms of costs and benefits, but that attractiveness alone does not determine whether or not we will join the group. Instead, our decision is based on two factors: our comparison level, and our comparison level for alternatives.

In John Thibaut and Harold Kelley's social exchange theory, comparison level is the standard by which an individual will evaluate the desirability of becoming a member of the group and forming new social relationships within the group. This comparison level is influenced by previous relationships and membership in different groups. Those individuals who have experienced positive rewards with few costs in previous relationships and groups will have a higher comparison level than a person who experienced more negative costs and fewer rewards in previous relationships and group memberships. According to the social exchange theory, group membership will be more satisfying to a new prospective member if the group's outcomes, in terms of costs and rewards, are above the individual's comparison level. As well, group membership will be unsatisfying to a new member if the outcomes are below the individual's comparison level.

Comparison level only predicts how satisfied a new member will be with the social relationships within the group. To determine whether people will actually join or leave a group, the value of other, alternative groups needs to be taken into account. This is called the comparison level for alternatives. This comparison level for alternatives is the standard by which an individual will evaluate the quality of the group in comparison to other groups the individual has the opportunity to join. Thiabaut and Kelley stated that the "comparison level for alternatives can be defined informally as the lowest level of outcomes a member will accept in the light of available alternative opportunities.”

Joining and leaving groups is ultimately dependent on the comparison level for alternatives, whereas member satisfaction within a group depends on the comparison level. To summarize, if membership in the group is above the comparison level for alternatives and above the comparison level, the membership within the group will be satisfying and an individual will be more likely to join the group. If membership in the group is above the comparison level for alternatives but below the comparison level, membership will be not be satisfactory; however, the individual will likely join the group since no other desirable options are available. When group membership is below the comparison level for alternatives but above the comparison level, membership is satisfying but an individual will be unlikely to join. If group membership is below both the comparison and alternative comparison levels, membership will be dissatisfying and the individual will be less likely to join the group.

=== Types of groups ===
Groups can vary drastically from one another. For example, three best friends who interact every day as well as a collection of people watching a movie in a theater both constitute a group. Past research has identified four basic types of groups which include, but are not limited to: primary groups, social groups, collective groups, and categories. It is important to define these four types of groups because they are intuitive to most lay people. For example, in an experiment, participants were asked to sort a number of groups into categories based on their own criteria. Examples of groups to be sorted were a sports team, a family, people at a bus stop and women. It was found that participants consistently sorted groups into four categories: intimacy groups, task groups, loose associations, and social categories. These categories are conceptually similar to the four basic types to be discussed. Therefore, it seems that individuals intuitively define aggregations of individuals in this way.

==== Primary groups ====
Primary groups are characterized by relatively small, long-lasting groups of individuals who share personally meaningful relationships. Since the members of these groups often interact face-to-face, they know each other very well and are unified. Individuals that are a part of primary groups consider the group to be an important part of their lives. Consequently, members strongly identify with their group, even without regular meetings. Cooley believed that primary groups were essential for integrating individuals into their society since this is often their first experience with a group. For example, individuals are born into a primary group, their family, which creates a foundation for them to base their future relationships. Individuals can be born into a primary group; however, primary groups can also form when individuals interact for extended periods of time in meaningful ways. Examples of primary groups include family, close friends, and gangs.

==== Social groups ====
A social group is characterized by a formally organized group of individuals who are not as emotionally involved with each other as those in a primary group. These groups tend to be larger, with shorter memberships compared to primary groups. Further, social groups do not have as stable memberships, since members are able to leave their social group and join new groups. The goals of social groups are often task-oriented as opposed to relationship-oriented. Examples of social groups include coworkers, clubs, and sports teams.

==== Collectives ====
Collectives are characterized by large groups of individuals who display similar actions or outlooks. They are loosely formed, spontaneous, and brief. Examples of collectives include a flash mob, an audience at a movie, and a crowd watching a building burn.

==== Categories ====
Categories are characterized by a collection of individuals who are similar in some way. Categories become groups when their similarities have social implications. For example, when people treat others differently because of certain aspects of their appearance or heritage, for example, this creates groups of different races. For this reason, categories can appear to be higher in entitativity and essentialism than primary, social, and collective groups. Entitativity is defined by Campbell as the extent to which collections of individuals are perceived to be a group. The degree of entitativity that a group has is influenced by whether a collection of individuals experience the same fate, display similarities, and are close in proximity. If individuals believe that a group is high in entitativity, then they are likely to believe that the group has unchanging characteristics that are essential to the group, known as essentialism. Examples of categories are New Yorkers, gamblers, and women.

=== Group membership and social identity ===
The social group is a critical source of information about individual identity. We naturally make comparisons between our own group and other groups, but we do not necessarily make objective comparisons. Instead, we make evaluations that are self-enhancing, emphasizing the positive qualities of our own group (in-group bias). In this way, these comparisons give us a distinct and valued social identity that benefits our self-esteem. Our social identity and group membership also satisfies a need to belong. Of course, individuals belong to multiple groups. Therefore, one's social identity can have several, qualitatively distinct parts (for example, one's ethnic identity, religious identity, and political identity).

Optimal distinctiveness theory suggests that individuals have a desire to be similar to others, but also a desire to differentiate themselves, ultimately seeking some balance of these two desires (to obtain optimal distinctiveness). For example, one might imagine a young teenager in the United States who tries to balance these desires, not wanting to be ‘just like everyone else,’ but also wanting to ‘fit in’ and be similar to others. One's collective self may offer a balance between these two desires. That is, to be similar to others (those who you share group membership with), but also to be different from others (those who are outside of your group).

=== Group cohesion ===
In the social sciences, group cohesion refers to the processes that keep members of a social group connected. Terms such as attraction, solidarity, and morale are often used to describe group cohesion. It is thought to be one of the most important characteristics of a group, and has been linked to group performance, intergroup conflict and therapeutic change.

Group cohesion, as a scientifically studied property of groups, is commonly associated with Kurt Lewin and his student, Leon Festinger. Lewin defined group cohesion as the willingness of individuals to stick together, and believed that without cohesiveness a group could not exist. As an extension of Lewin's work, Festinger (along with Stanley Schachter and Kurt Back) described cohesion as, “the total field of forces which act on members to remain in the group” (Festinger, Schachter, & Back, 1950, p. 37). Later, this definition was modified to describe the forces acting on individual members to remain in the group, termed attraction to the group. Since then, several models for understanding the concept of group cohesion have been developed, including Albert Carron's hierarchical model and several bi-dimensional models (vertical v. horizontal cohesion, task v. social cohesion, belongingness and morale, and personal v. social attraction). Before Lewin and Festinger, there were, of course, descriptions of a very similar group property. For example, Emile Durkheim described two forms of solidarity (mechanical and organic), which created a sense of collective conscious and an emotion-based sense of community.

=== Black sheep effect ===
Beliefs within the in-group are based on how individuals in the group see their other members. Individuals tend to upgrade likeable in-group members and deviate from unlikeable group members, making them a separate out-group. This is called the black sheep effect. The way a person judges socially desirable and socially undesirable individuals depends upon whether they are part of the in-group or out-group.

This phenomenon has been later accounted for by subjective group dynamics theory. According to this theory, people derogate socially undesirable (deviant) in-group members relative to out-group members, because they give a bad image of the in-group and jeopardize people's social identity.

In more recent studies, Marques and colleagues have shown that this occurs more strongly with regard to in-group full members than other members. Whereas new members of a group must prove themselves to the full members to become accepted, full members have undergone socialization and are already accepted within the group. They have more privilege than newcomers but more responsibility to help the group achieve its goals. Marginal members were once full members but have lost membership because they failed to live up to the group's expectations. They can rejoin the group if they go through re-socialization. Therefore, full members' behavior is paramount to define the in-group's image.

Bogart and Ryan surveyed the development of new members' stereotypes about in-groups and out-groups during socialization. Results showed that the new members judged themselves as consistent with the stereotypes of their in-groups, even when they had recently committed to join those groups or existed as marginal members. They also tended to judge the group as a whole in an increasingly less positive manner after they became full members. However, there is no evidence that this affects the way they are judged by other members. Nevertheless, depending on the self-esteem of an individual, members of the in-group may experience different private beliefs about the group's activities but will publicly express the opposite—that they actually share these beliefs. One member may not personally agree with something the group does, but to avoid the black sheep effect, they will publicly agree with the group and keep the private beliefs to themselves. If the person is privately self-aware, he or she is more likely to comply with the group even if they possibly have their own beliefs about the situation.

In situations of hazing within fraternities and sororities on college campuses, pledges may encounter this type of situation and may outwardly comply with the tasks they are forced to do regardless of their personal feelings about the Greek institution they are joining. This is done in an effort to avoid becoming an outcast of the group. Outcasts who behave in a way that might jeopardize the group tend to be treated more harshly than the likeable ones in a group, creating a black sheep effect. Full members of a fraternity might treat the incoming new members harshly, causing the pledges to decide if they approve of the situation and if they will voice their disagreeing opinions about it.

=== Group influence on individual behaviour ===
Individual behaviour is influenced by the presence of others. For example, studies have found that individuals work harder and faster when others are present (see social facilitation), and that an individual's performance is reduced when others in the situation create distraction or conflict. Groups also influence individuals' decision-making processes. These include decisions related to in-group bias, persuasion (see Asch conformity experiments), obedience (see Milgram Experiment), and groupthink. There are both positive and negative implications of group influence on individual behaviour. This type of influence is often useful in the context of work settings, team sports, and political activism. However, the influence of groups on the individual can also generate extremely negative behaviours, evident in Nazi Germany, the My Lai massacre, and in the Abu Ghraib prison (also see Abu Ghraib torture and prisoner abuse).

=== Group structure ===
A group's structure is the internal framework that defines members' relations to one another over time. Frequently studied elements of group structure include roles, norms, values, communication patterns, and status differentials. Group structure has also been defined as the underlying pattern of roles, norms, and networks of relations among members that define and organize the group.

Roles can be defined as a tendency to behave, contribute and interrelate with others in a particular way. Roles may be assigned formally, but more often are defined through the process of role differentiation. Role differentiation is the degree to which different group members have specialized functions. A group with a high level of role differentiation would be categorized as having many different roles that are specialized and narrowly defined. A key role in a group is the leader, but there are other important roles as well, including task roles, relationship roles, and individual roles. Functional (task) roles are generally defined in relation to the tasks the team is expected to perform. Individuals engaged in task roles focus on the goals of the group and on enabling the work that members do; examples of task roles include coordinator, recorder, critic, or technician. A group member engaged in a relationship role (or socioemotional role) is focused on maintaining the interpersonal and emotional needs of the groups' members; examples of relationship role include encourager, harmonizer, or compromiser.

Norms are the informal rules that groups adopt to regulate members' behaviour. Norms refer to what should be done and represent value judgments about appropriate behaviour in social situations. Although they are infrequently written down or even discussed, norms have powerful influence on group behaviour. They are a fundamental aspect of group structure as they provide direction and motivation, and organize the social interactions of members. Norms are said to be emergent, as they develop gradually throughout interactions between group members. While many norms are widespread throughout society, groups may develop their own norms that members must learn when they join the group. There are various types of norms, including: prescriptive, proscriptive, descriptive, and injunctive.

- Prescriptive norms: the socially appropriate way to respond in a social situation, or what group members are supposed to do (e.g. saying "thank you" after someone does a favour)
- Proscriptive norms: actions that group members should not do; prohibitive (e.g. not belching in public)
- Descriptive norms: describe what people usually do (e.g. clapping after a speech)
- Injunctive norms: describe behaviours that people ought to do; more evaluative in nature than a descriptive norm

Intermember relations are the connections among the members of a group, or the social network within a group. Group members are linked to one another at varying levels. Examining the intermember relations of a group can highlight a group's density (how many members are linked to one another), or the degree centrality of members (number of ties between members). Analysing the intermember relations aspect of a group can highlight the degree centrality of each member in the group, which can lead to a better understanding of the roles of certain group (e.g. an individual who is a "go-between" in a group will have closer ties to numerous group members which can aid in communication, etc.).

Values are goals or ideas that serve as guiding principles for the group. Like norms, values may be communicated either explicitly or on an ad hoc basis. Values can serve as a rallying point for the team. However, some values (such as conformity) can also be dysfunction and lead to poor decisions by the team.

Communication patterns describe the flow of information within the group and they are typically described as either centralized or decentralized. With a centralized pattern, communications tend to flow from one source to all group members. Centralized communications allow standardization of information, but may restrict the free flow of information. Decentralized communications make it easy to share information directly between group members. When decentralized, communications tend to flow more freely, but the delivery of information may not be as fast or accurate as with centralized communications. Another potential downside of decentralized communications is the sheer volume of information that can be generated, particularly with electronic media.

Status differentials are the relative differences in status among group members. When a group is first formed the members may all be on an equal level, but over time certain members may acquire status and authority within the group; this can create what is known as a pecking order within a group. Status can be determined by a variety of factors and characteristics, including specific status characteristics (e.g. task-specific behavioural and personal characteristics, such as experience) or diffuse status characteristics (e.g. age, race, ethnicity). It is important that other group members perceive an individual's status to be warranted and deserved, as otherwise they may not have authority within the group. Status differentials may affect the relative amount of pay among group members and they may also affect the group's tolerance to violation of group norms (e.g. people with higher status may be given more freedom to violate group norms).

=== Group performance ===
Forsyth suggests that while many daily tasks undertaken by individuals could be performed in isolation, the preference is to perform with other people.

==== Social facilitation and performance gains ====
In a study of dynamogenic stimulation for the purpose of explaining pacemaking and competition in 1898, Norman Triplett theorized that "the bodily presence of another rider is a stimulus to the racer in arousing the competitive instinct...". This dynamogenic factor is believed to have laid the groundwork for what is now known as social facilitation—an "improvement in task performance that occurs when people work in the presence of other people".

Further to Triplett's observation, in 1920, Floyd Allport found that although people in groups were more productive than individuals, the quality of their product/effort was inferior.

In 1965, Robert Zajonc expanded the study of arousal response (originated by Triplett) with further research in the area of social facilitation. In his study, Zajonc considered two experimental paradigms. In the first—audience effects—Zajonc observed behaviour in the presence of passive spectators, and the second—co-action effects—he examined behaviour in the presence of another individual engaged in the same activity.

Zajonc observed two categories of behaviours—dominant responses to tasks that are easier to learn and which dominate other potential responses and nondominant responses to tasks that are less likely to be performed. In his Theory of Social Facilitation, Zajonc concluded that in the presence of others, when action is required, depending on the task requirement, either social facilitation or social interference will impact the outcome of the task. If social facilitation occurs, the task will have required a dominant response from the individual resulting in better performance in the presence of others, whereas if social interference occurs the task will have elicited a nondominant response from the individual resulting in subpar performance of the task.

Several theories analysing performance gains in groups via drive, motivational, cognitive and personality processes, explain why social facilitation occurs.

Zajonc hypothesized that compresence (the state of responding in the presence of others) elevates an individual's drive level which in turn triggers social facilitation when tasks are simple and easy to execute, but impedes performance when tasks are challenging.

Nickolas Cottrell, 1972, proposed the evaluation apprehension model whereby he suggested people associate social situations with an evaluative process. Cottrell argued this situation is met with apprehension and it is this motivational response, not arousal/elevated drive, that is responsible for increased productivity on simple tasks and decreased productivity on complex tasks in the presence of others.

In The Presentation of Self in Everyday Life (1959), Erving Goffman assumes that individuals can control how they are perceived by others. He suggests that people fear being perceived as having negative, undesirable qualities and characteristics by other people, and that it is this fear that compels individuals to portray a positive self-presentation/social image of themselves. In relation to performance gains, Goffman's self-presentation theory predicts, in situations where they may be evaluated, individuals will consequently increase their efforts in order to project/preserve/maintain a positive image.

Distraction-conflict theory contends that when a person is working in the presence of other people, an interference effect occurs splitting the individual's attention between the task and the other person. On simple tasks, where the individual is not challenged by the task, the interference effect is negligible and performance, therefore, is facilitated. On more complex tasks, where drive is not strong enough to effectively compete against the effects of distraction, there is no performance gain. The Stroop task (Stroop effect) demonstrated that, by narrowing a person's focus of attention on certain tasks, distractions can improve performance.

Social orientation theory considers the way a person approaches social situations. It predicts that self-confident individuals with a positive outlook will show performance gains through social facilitation, whereas a self-conscious individual approaching social situations with apprehension is less likely to perform well due to social interference effects.

== Intergroup dynamics ==
Intergroup dynamics (or intergroup relations) refers to the behavioural and psychological relationship between two or more groups. This includes perceptions, attitudes, opinions, and behaviours towards one's own group, as well as those towards another group. In some cases, intergroup dynamics is prosocial, positive, and beneficial (for example, when multiple research teams work together to accomplish a task or goal). In other cases, intergroup dynamics can create conflict. For example, Fischer & Ferlie found initially positive dynamics between a clinical institution and its external authorities dramatically changed to a 'hot' and intractable conflict when authorities interfered with its embedded clinical model. Similarly, underlying the 1999 Columbine High School shooting in Littleton, Colorado, United States, intergroup dynamics played a significant role in Eric Harris’ and Dylan Klebold's decision to kill a teacher and 14 students (including themselves).

=== Intergroup conflict ===
According to social identity theory, intergroup conflict starts with a process of comparison between individuals in one group (the ingroup) to those of another group (the outgroup). This comparison process is not unbiased and objective. Instead, it is a mechanism for enhancing one's self-esteem. In the process of such comparisons, an individual tends to:

- favour the ingroup over the outgroup
- exaggerate and overgeneralize the differences between the ingroup and the outgroup (to enhance group distinctiveness)
- minimize the perception of differences between ingroup members
- remember more detailed and positive information about the ingroup, and more negative information about the outgroup

Even without any intergroup interaction (as in the minimal group paradigm), individuals begin to show favouritism towards their own group, and negative reactions towards the outgroup. This conflict can result in prejudice, stereotypes, and discrimination. Intergroup conflict can be highly competitive, especially for social groups with a long history of conflict (for example, the 1994 Rwandan genocide, rooted in group conflict between the ethnic Hutu and Tutsi). In contrast, intergroup competition can sometimes be relatively harmless, particularly in situations where there is little history of conflict (for example, between students of different universities) leading to relatively harmless generalizations and mild competitive behaviours. Intergroup conflict is commonly recognized amidst racial, ethnic, religious, and political groups.

The formation of intergroup conflict was investigated in a popular series of studies by Muzafer Sherif and colleagues in 1961, called the Robbers Cave Experiment. The Robbers Cave Experiment was later used to support realistic conflict theory. Other prominent theories relating to intergroup conflict include social dominance theory, and social-/self-categorization theory.

=== Intergroup conflict reduction ===
There have been several strategies developed for reducing the tension, bias, prejudice, and conflict between social groups. These include the contact hypothesis, the jigsaw classroom, and several categorization-based strategies.

==== Contact hypothesis (intergroup contact theory) ====
In 1954, Gordon Allport suggested that by promoting contact between groups, prejudice can be reduced. Further, he suggested four optimal conditions for contact: equal status between the groups in the situation; common goals; intergroup cooperation; and the support of authorities, law, or customs. Since then, over 500 studies have been done on prejudice reduction under variations of the contact hypothesis, and a meta-analytic review suggests overall support for its efficacy. In some cases, even without the four optimal conditions outlined by Allport, prejudice between groups can be reduced.

==== Superordinate identities ====
Under the contact hypothesis, several models have been developed. A number of these models utilize a superordinate identity to reduce prejudice: that is, a more broadly defined, umbrella group or identity that includes the groups that are in conflict. By emphasizing this superordinate identity, individuals in both subgroups can share a common social identity. For example, if there is conflict between White, Black, and Latino students in a high school, one might try to emphasize the high school group/identity that students share to reduce conflict between the groups. Models utilizing superordinate identities include the common ingroup identity model, the ingroup projection model, the mutual intergroup differentiation model, and the ingroup identity model. Similarly, recategorization is a broader term used by Gaertner et al. to describe the strategies aforementioned.

==== Interdependence ====
There are techniques that utilize interdependence, between two or more groups, with the aim of reducing prejudice. That is, members across groups have to rely on one another to accomplish some goal or task. In the Robbers Cave Experiment, Sherif used this strategy to reduce conflict between groups. Elliot Aronson’s Jigsaw Classroom also uses this strategy of interdependence.

== Selected academic journals ==
- Group Processes & Intergroup Relations
- Group Dynamics: Theory, Research, and Practice
- Small Group Research
- Group Analysis
- International Journal of Group Psychotherapy
- The Journal for Specialists in Group Work
- Social Work With Groups
- International Journal on Minority and Group Rights
- Group Facilitation: A Research and Applications Journal
- Organizational and Social Dynamics

== See also ==
- Cog's ladder
- Collaboration
- Collaborative method
- Decision downloading
- Ethnic identity development
- Facilitator
- Frog pond effect
- Group narcissism
- Groupware
- High-performance teams (HPT)
- Intergroup dialogue
- Intergroup relations
- Interpersonal relationships
- Maintenance actions
- Organization climate
- Out-group homogeneity
- Political identity development
- Small-group communication
- Social psychology
- Social psychology (sociology)
- Social tuning
- Team effectiveness
- Team-based learning
