= Small group =

Small group may refer to:

- Communication in small groups, a group of three or more people who share a common goal and communicate collectively to achieve it
- List of small groups, a list of finite groups of small order up to group isomorphism
- Small group learning, an educational approach that focuses on individuals learning in small groups and is distinguished from learning climate and organizational learning
- Small Group Research, an American academic journal
- Cell group, a form of church organization that is used in many Christian churches
