= Process consultant =

A process consultant is a highly qualified professional that has insights into and understands the psychological and social dynamics of working with various client systems such as whole organizations, groups, and individuals. Part of the field called Human Systems Intervention, process consultation is a philosophy of helping, a general theory and methodology of intervening (e.g. Schein 1999).

== Skills ==
Given the complex nature of intervening, a process consultant's expertise includes the following (and many other) skills:

- Works concomitantly with groups and individuals (managers/directors) towards a larger change process such as strategic visioning, strategic planning, etc.
- Based on the context, selects from a variety of methods, tools and change theories a facilitative intervention that will most benefit the client system.
- Stays aware of covert organizational processes, group dynamics, and interpersonal issues.

== Role in organizational development ==
In organization development, a process consultant is a specialized type of consultant who acts as a facilitator to help groups deal with issues involving the process in a meeting, rather than with the actual tasks themselves.

== Role in small group development ==
A process consultant may be used at any time during the Stages of Group Development. Occasionally, a process consultant is used when a group is either in its formative stage, or normative stage. However, more often than not, they participate when the group is in conflict.

== Role in conflict resolution ==
Often a group finds itself in conflict over facts, goals, methods or values. It is the role of the process consultant to help the group reach consensus over the type of conflict it faces.

Once the type of conflict is identified, the process consultant then helps the group work through the steps required to break the impasse.

The process consultant's role is not to solve the problem, but to help the group solve its own problem. The reason for this is because it is the group, not the consultant who will have to live with the consequences of its decision.

== Role in conflict management ==
Occasionally, due to the nature of conflict, the process consultant may need to guide the group toward conflict management rather than conflict resolution.

== Techniques used ==
Initially a process consultant will not lead or participate in a group meeting, but rather will act as an observer. During this time, they observe the group dynamics to determine what interpersonal relationships may contribute to the group's issues.

At some point, they will begin to actively participate in the meeting, by asking clarifying questions or paraphrasing. Eventually, they will make their observations known by giving the group feedback.

== Education required ==
To enter this field, a background in psychology and small group learning is helpful. Experience in reading body language and possessing analytical skills are also useful. However, receiving some training in experiential education will probably be the most beneficial.
