= WisCEL =

Program at the University of Wisconsin-Madison, United States of America

The Wisconsin Collaboratory for Enhanced Learning, WisCEL, is a new program at the University of Wisconsin-Madison, USA, initiated by faculty from various departments. WisCEL's goal is use classroom innovation to lead all students to academic success. There are currently two WisCEL Centers located on UW-Madion's campus, at Helen C. White College Library and in Kurt F. Wendt Commons.

== WisCEL Pedagogy and Course Design ==
The educators involved in the WisCEL program are encouraged to use non-traditional methods of teaching and a course design built around technology and collaboration-friendly learning spaces. (See WisCEL Center Layout and Usage for technology examples).

In a WisCEL class, emphasis is placed on individualized learning even while class sizes continue to increase. WisCEL doesn't specify any particular course design, but supports faculty in their use of teaching strategies such as flipped classroom Flip teaching, problem based learning, students working together spontaneously, instructor-as-coach models, self-paced learning opportunities, immediate learning progress feedback, and increased instructor time with students. Traditional lecture is replaced with reading and online materials such as short video lectures watched outside of class time. With the lecture material delivered, students can spend class time doing practical activities with the instructor to apply their knowledge of the course material. Computerized homework and exams free up instructor and teaching assistant time to spend directly with the students to help them learn. Digital signs allow the students to easily access the schedule so that they are aware of which seats they can use, when, and for how long.

Other universities have also adopted similar programs, such as SCALE-UP at North Carolina State, and the University of Minnesota's Active Learning Classrooms.

== WisCEL Center Layout and Usage ==
Recent research has shown that learning environments have a statistically significant effect on students' level of success in the classroom. Because of this, an important part of the WisCEL Centers approach is to use multi-use space that students already embrace as "their own" place to encourage informal learning, and to combine this with state-of-the-art classroom technologies and formal classroom instruction. The resulting collaboration-friendly Centers provide environments conducive to active learning and student success.

Each WisCEL Center contains a large active learning lab, consultations room(s), breakout rooms, staff office, and student lounge area. Food and drinks are welcome at the WisCEL Centers and students are encouraged to feel comfortable and to think of the space as theirs.

Active Learning Labs
Providing seating for over 100 students, six-person tables are spaced so that instructors can easily walk throughout the room as they mentor and coach students. Although the room is equipped with projectors, projection screens, an instructor computer, a SMART Podium, and a wireless microphone with audio system, the room is not conducive to lecture. Instead, these technologies allow instructors to give quick instructions (5–10 minutes) and then let students get to work applying and practicing concepts. Each student seat is equipped with a computer on which technology-assisted course software is available for homework and test completion. Courses use a variety of software and applications such as SMARTsync by SMART Technologies, Moodle, and textbook-specific software like Pearson's MyMathLab and McGraw-Hill's Connect. Other packages are used as well as each course has its own design and requirements. The software is used to help the students work together on concepts but to deliver individual questions so that individual work is required and assessed. Software also provides immediate feedback to the students so that they immediately know if they need help understanding a concept and can ask an instructor right away as well as the ability to practice at home with feedback. Presentation displays and mobile whiteboards are spread throughout the space to help students work together. Mobile whiteboards are also used as temporary space dividers to allow more than one activity to be scheduled at a time.

Consultation Rooms
Instructors and teaching assistants meet in the consultations space with individual students or small student groups. Mobile tables and multimedia displays can be found here, and each instructor sharing the space is given a mobile, lockable filing cabinet. Consultation rooms are also available for student study when not reserved for formal instructional activities.

Breakout Rooms
Breakout rooms of varying size allow groups of students to separate from the active learning lab to work on specialized material or group projects. Each breakout room is equipped with presentation equipment, mobile tables and chairs to make collaboration quick and easy. Breakout rooms of varying size allow groups of students to separate from the active learning lab to work on specialized material or group projects.

Staff Office
A lockable office is shared by WisCEL faculty and staff.

Student Lounge
Student lounge areas are composed of comfortable furnishings and an abundance of power outlets throughout. The spaces are designed to host informal gatherings, collaborative or individual study or simply some “down time” for students.

== Learning Outcome Improvement ==
Early evaluation results show that students in WisCEL sections consistently achieve grade outcomes of A, AB, and B and fewer grade outcomes of D, and F than in non-WisCEL sections of the same course and students feel more engaged in WisCEL courses. Research shows that 'flipping' allows instructors to make the traditional lecture model more productive.

== WisCEL Today ==
Fall of 2012 was the first non pilot semester for WisCEL, where the program included involvement from Colleges and departments across the university. A proposal process is used to schedule space in the Centers and a goal is to use all seats at all times for instruction. It is common for more than one class to be occurring in the same space at the same time when there are no lectures given during class time.

== Additional Links featuring WisCEL ==
http://www.news.wisc.edu/20349/
http://edinnovation.wisc.edu/innovations/wiscel-classes-create-unique-learning-commons/
http://discovery.wisc.edu/home/discovery/recorded-lectures/carl-wieman-32012/
http://badgerherald.com/news/2012/02/27/uw_launches_improved.php
