= 21K School World Campus =

Online school

Information
- Established: 2020; 6 years ago
- Website: www.21kschool.com/in/

21K School World Campus is an online school. Started in 2020, it is the largest global online school with approximately 10,000 members globally , with around 8,000 students from 74 countries in addition to 500 facilitators. Members are the accounts in total in the google contacts directory. The school is designed to cater to requirements of students from Europe, Asia Pacific, the Middle East and Africa. The school is planned to cover 1.5 billion students from 205 countries.

== History and objective ==
21K School World Campus was started with the objective of providing the students a channel of learning, being innovative, building and developing themselves from their homes.

== Syllabus ==
21K School World Campus' goal is to increase educational quality and follows Cambridge Assessment International Education (CAIE) and Pearson Edexcel qualifications. It uses Oxford books and it has British Curriculum, Indian Curriculum and American Curriculum

== See also ==
- Virtual Education
