= Competition-based learning =

Competition-based learning (CBL) is a student-centered pedagogy that combines project-based learning and competitions. This can sometimes be referred to as game-based learning as well, which is different than gamification. CBL also utilizes team-based learning (or Active Collaborative Learning, ACL) and problem-based learning paradigms. Competition-based learning involves a team of students in an open-ended assignments or projects that resembles some problems students may face at the work place or in the real-world. However, the performance is being evaluated on the final completion of the project or task assigned in the course as a comparison to other groups. The aspiration is to create motivation in the students to come up with the best overall project. CBL learning relies on the competition results. Furthermore, CBL implements a reward system upon the completion of the task assigned to reinforce desired behaviors in learning environments.

== Background and advantages ==
The real-world is competitive and competition has been used in teaching and learning throughout the human history around the world. Countries such as England, Singapore, and South Korea have special education programs which cater for specialist students, prompting charges of academic elitism. Currently, academic competitions are popular. According to The Institute of Competition Sciences retrieved on May 30, 2020, over 4,000,000 students participate in educational competitions in over 500 competitions across all academic subject they monitor in their network.

Many practitioners in education claim that CBL can enhance students' motivation to work harder and the learning outcomes since they are more excited about the project and potential rewards. Competition is good in the sense that it discourages complacency and raises students' consciousness of the value of good outcomes. As a result, the keener the competition, the higher the output among students. This is manifested not only in high individual averages, but in overall high class averages. It is, therefore, a very effective tool to keep your high achievers achieving. Other benefits of CBL include the enhancement of problem-solving, creative thinking, and teamwork skills.

== Examples ==
Some articles reporting competitions in across various academic subjects include

- EFFECTS OF COMPETITION IN EDUCATION: A CASE STUDY IN AN E-LEARNING ENVIRONMENT - by Iván Cantador, José M. Conde, Departamento de Ingeniería Informática, Universidad Autónoma de Madrid
- Learning through Competitions – Competition-Based Learning (CBL) - by CJ Chung, from CTL (Center for Teaching & Learning) Conference at Lawrence Technological University, April 2008
- Utilizing Project-Based Learningand Competition to DevelopStudent Skills and Interest inProducing Quality Food Items - by Willard, M.W. Duffrin, from Vol. 2, 2003—JOURNAL OF FOOD SCIENCE EDUCATION
- The Big List of Student Contests and Competitions - from We Are Teachers, weareteachers.com

Here is a comprehensive list of competitions that can be used for classes or after-school extracurricular programs. Hackathons can be examples of CBL. The purpose of a hackathon is a for a group of software developers to work together on a collaborative project. Most hackathons are competitions where several teams are competing to create prototypes that innovate on a theme or improve upon an existing project.

== Criticism ==
Some people think in class competition is not good, since it is discouraging when others always seem to do better than you. Critics of competition as a motivating factor in education systems, such as Alfie Kohn, argue that competition actually has a net negative influence on the achievement levels of students. Competition can easily lead to stress, anxiety and disappointment, especially if it promotes academic competition between "individual" students. This stress can force students to push back other interests and extracurricular activities, leading to an unbalanced school life. A poor competition result may affect students' emotions or hurt their confidence. If a competition does not provide students with a goal that is attainable for nearly everyone, the activity becomes unbalanced, with some jumping ahead and others ending up left in the dust. This is the kind of competition that will lead to a diminished desire to participate in related activities or subject fields. An unhealthy competition may be one that is focused on winning instead of moving toward on learning a new skill or working as a team. Therefore, the design of CBL methodologies needs to focus on driving students to collaboratively achieve learning outcomes, not just winning the competition.
