= Drive theory =

Psychological theory

In psychology, a drive theory, theory of drives or drive doctrine is a theory that attempts to analyze, classify or define the psychological drives. A drive is an instinctual need that has the power of influencing the behavior of an individual; an "excitatory state produced by a homeostatic disturbance".

Drive theory is based on the principle that organisms are born with certain psychological needs and that a negative state of tension is created when these needs are not satisfied. When a need is satisfied, drive is reduced and the organism returns to a state of homeostasis and relaxation. According to the theory, drive tends to increase over time and operates on a feedback control system, much like a thermostat.

In 1943 two psychologists, Clark Hull and Kenneth Spence, put forward a drive theory as an explanation of all behavior. In a study conducted by Hull, two groups of rats were put in a maze, group A was given food after three hours and group B was given food after twenty-two hours. Hull had decided that the rats that were deprived of food longer would be more likely to develop a habit of going down the same path to obtain food.

== Psychoanalysis ==
In psychoanalysis, drive theory (German: Triebtheorie or Trieblehre) refers to the theory of drives, motivations, or instincts, that have clear objects. When an internal imbalance is detected by homeostatic mechanisms, a drive to restore balance is produced. In 1927, Sigmund Freud said that a drive theory was what was lacking most in psychoanalysis. He was opposed to personality systematics in psychology, rejecting it as a form of paranoia, and instead classified drives with dichotomies like Eros/Thanatos drives (the drives toward life and death, respectively) and sexual/ego drives.

Freud's Civilization and Its Discontents was published in Germany in 1930, when the rise of fascism in that country was well under way, and the warnings of a second European war were leading to opposing calls for rearmament and pacifism. Against this background, Freud wrote "In face of the destructive forces unleashed, now it may be expected that the other of the two 'heavenly forces,' eternal Eros, will put forth his strength so as to maintain himself alongside of his equally immortal adversary."

In 1947, Hungarian psychiatrist and psychologist Leopold Szondi aimed instead at a systematic drive theory. Szondi's drive diagram has been described as a revolutionary addition to psychology, and as paving the way for a theoretical psychiatry and a psychoanalytical anthropology.

== Early attachment theory ==
In early attachment theory, behavioral drive reduction was proposed by Dollard and Miller (1950) as an explanation of the mechanisms behind early attachment in infants. Behavioural drive reduction theory suggests that infants are born with innate drives, such as hunger and thirst, which only the caregiver, usually the mother, can reduce. Through a process of classical conditioning, the infant learns to associate the mother with the satisfaction of reduced drive and is thus able to form a key attachment bond. However, this theory is challenged by the work done by Harry Harlow, particularly the experiments involving the maternal separation of rhesus monkeys, which indicate that comfort possesses greater motivational value than hunger.

== Social psychology ==
In social psychology, drive theory was used by Robert Zajonc in 1965 as an explanation of the phenomenon of social facilitation. The audience effect notes that, in some cases, the presence of a passive audience will facilitate the better performance of a task, while in other cases the presence of an audience will inhibit the performance of a task. Zajonc's drive theory suggests that the variable determining direction of performance is whether the task is composed of a correct dominant response (that is, the task is perceived as being subjectively easy to the individual) or an incorrect dominant response (perceived as being subjectively difficult).

In the presence of a passive audience, an individual is in a heightened state of arousal. Increased arousal, or stress, causes the individual to enact behaviours that form dominant responses, since an individual's dominant response is the most likely response, given the skills which are available. If the dominant response is correct, then social presence enhances performance of the task. However, if the dominant response is incorrect, social presence produces an impaired performance. Increasing performance of well learned tasks and impairing performance on poorly learned tasks.

=== Corroborative evidence ===
Such behaviour was first noticed by Triplett (1898) while observing the cyclists who were racing together versus cyclists who were racing alone. It was found that the mere presence of other cyclists produced greater performance. A similar effect was observed by Chen (1937) in ants building colonies. However, it was not until Zajonc investigated this behaviour in the 1960s that any empirical explanation for the audience effect was pursued.

Zajonc's drive theory is based on an experiment involving the investigation of the effect of social facilitation in cockroaches. Zajonc devised a study in which individual cockroaches were released into a tube, at the end of which there was a light. In the presence of other cockroaches as spectators, cockroaches were observed to achieve a significantly faster time in reaching the light than those in the control, no-spectator group. However, when cockroaches in the same conditions were given a maze to negotiate, performance was impaired in the spectator condition, demonstrating that incorrect dominant responses in the presence of an audience impair performance.

=== Evaluation apprehension ===
Cottrell's evaluation apprehension model later refined this theory to include yet another variable in the mechanisms of social facilitation. He suggested that the correctness of dominant responses only plays a role in social facilitation when there is an expectation of social reward or punishment based on performance. His study differs in design from Zajonc's as he introduced a separate condition in which participants were given tasks to perform in the presence of an audience that was blindfolded, and thus unable to evaluate the participant's performance. It was found that no social facilitation effect occurred, and hence the anticipation of performance evaluation must play a role in social facilitation. Evaluation apprehension, however, is only key in human social facilitation and is not observed in other animals.
