= Small group learning =

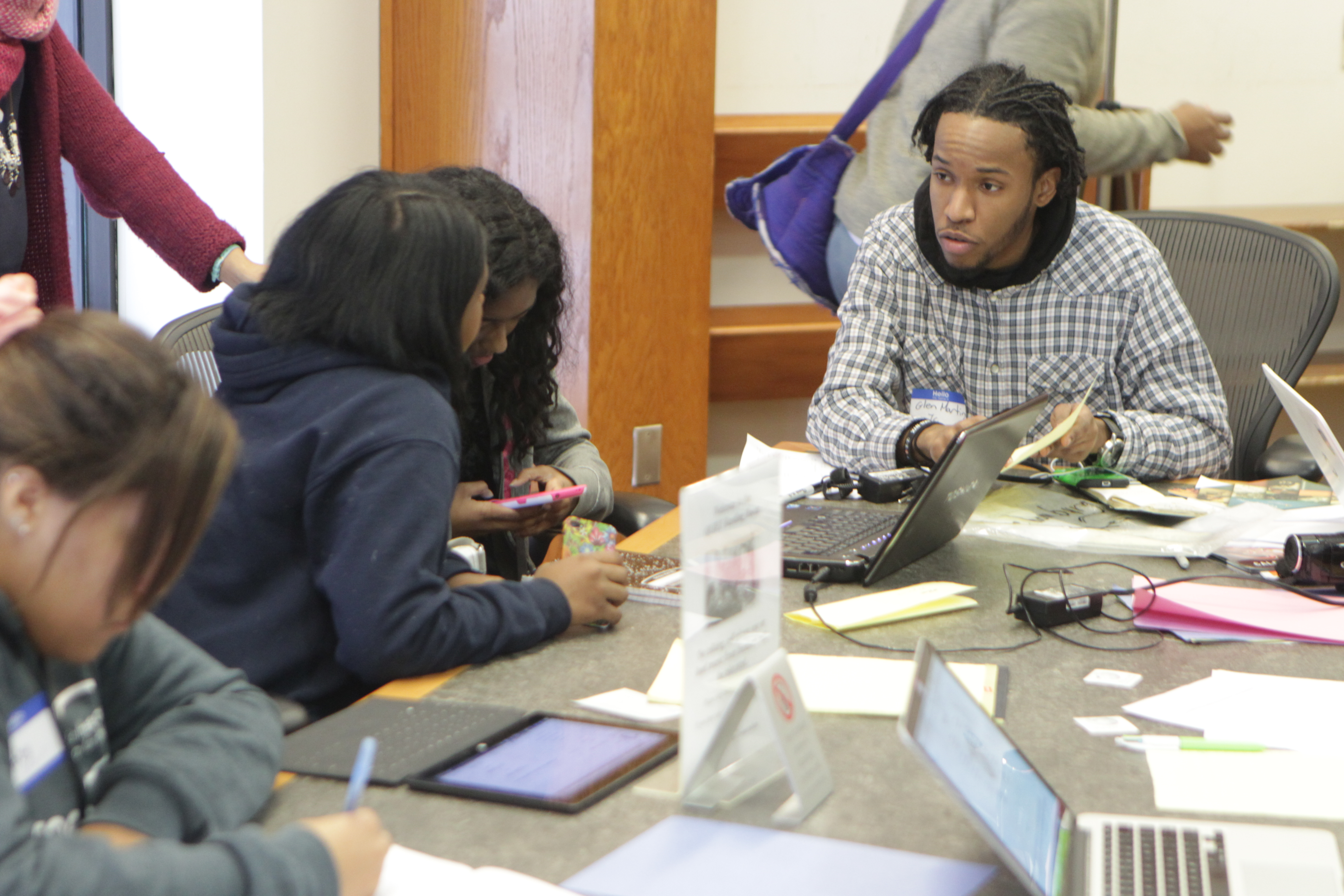
People Learning Together

Small group learning is an educational approach that focuses on individuals learning in small groups and is distinguished from learning climate and organizational learning. It is also described as a team-based approach to learning where students work together towards shared learning objectives.

== Concept ==
This model is based on the idea that the small group learning format encourages learners not only to express their understanding of a topic but also compare their ideas, allowing for a deeper and more meaningful learning. It is also expected to develop personal generic attributes such as communication, team-working, presentation, and debating skills.

Small group learning can take the form of a classroom-based training through experiential learning activities such as case study analysis, role plays, games, simulations, and brainstorming, among others. These activities require the learners to work together to achieve a learning goal. This is seen as a powerful learning method for students of all ages and linked to the active learning research showing increased student motivation and attainment. In a recent meta analysis of group learning studies based on 49 independent samples, from 37 studies encompassing 116 separate findings, students who learned in small groups demonstrated greater achievement. However, studies that do produce positive outcomes are not always received with so positively by those in the teaching profession because of classroom management issues.

Small-group learning is closely related to research on cooperative learning and social interdependence theory. Johnson and Johnson argue that cooperative learning is most effective when learners have positive interdependence, individual accountability, promotive interaction, appropriate social skills and group processing. In higher education, Johnson, Johnson and Smith describe cooperative learning as an instructional approach based on structured interaction rather than simply placing students in groups.

== Approach ==
The group work has to be carefully planned and frequently requires a facilitator to ensure group progress. In addition, the group function and the learning that takes place needs to be assessed and evaluated. In important part of this process is planning purposeful questions and getting students to talk to each other and within the class. The material learned is just as important as the group's ability to achieve a common goal. Facilitatory skills are important and require the teacher to ensure that both the task is achieved and the group functioning is maintained. One of the key issues is the way one or two people can begin to dominate the possible 'airtime' by doing 50-70% of the talking. Another important area of research is the group allocation method or make up of the group, and the possible benefits of multicultural, different skills, or educational attainment.

Group size can also effect the way small group share and learning together, for instance a size of group over 7 tends to split into smaller groups, and may need a student to act as a chairperson to help facilitate the learning. The SCALE-UP process recommends groups no larger than three students, and arranges them around round tables of nine students for wider discussions. However one study finds the best size is five students.

Practical techniques or technologies that the group can used to share their understand with each other and their teacher include, mindmapping, delphi technique or software solutions.

== Advantages & Disadvantages ==
Small group learning allows students to develop problem-solving, interpersonal, presentational and communication skills, all beneficial to life outside the classroom. These generic skills are difficult to develop in isolation and require feedback and interaction with other individuals. Specific advantages of this learning model for the group of learners include the opportunity to compare learning performance with peers and the development of a sense of responsibility for their learning progress. The small group learning is also used for adult learning because it is associated with active involvement, collaboration, and problem-solving.

Although this practice is not the best way for students to develop and improve on these skills there are some ways to make this effective for both the student and the instructor. According to Francine Armenth-Brothers in her article, "How to Make Small-Group Learning Work," one thing to keep in mind when implementing this practice is to not start without directions that would help alleviate confusion in a group. Also, the instructor should choose the members in a group, keeping learning levels and student diversity in mind when doing so.

Some experts have criticized small group learning, especially that which consists of extremely small groups, for reducing learn-responsibility and thereby reducing the motivation to learn. When learning in a group, individuals can lose sight of their learning objectives and prioritize those they have in common in others. In addition, they may be subject to the free-rider effect in groups that have a few highly skilled members. However, educational researchers have explored and developed techniques to reduce these effect such as the Jigsaw Process amongst others.

One of the most difficult issues with in group work is when the group is marked for their performance as a whole. Allowing the student to use a process by which they allocate a percentage of the marks can help prevent 'social loafing' and make those students who are putting in more effort feel more in control of the process. Some researchers have developed online technologies to help organise and mediate these processes, such as Webpa. Research into this approach has been shown to help reduce these factors, although students may intentionally or unintentionally pick on one student.

Group learning is perceived as a necessary life-and-employment skill to be developed throughout a students career, and can help with making friends, motivation and improved performance through division of labour.

== See also ==
- Small group communication
- Jigsaw Method
- Brainstorming
- Debate
- Problem Based Learning
- SCALE-UP
- Active Learning
