= Larry Michaelsen =

- Occupation: Professor of management
- Known for: Team-based learning

Larry K. Michaelsen is a David Ross Boyd Professor Emeritus of Management at the University of Oklahoma. He is also a Professor Emeritus at the University of Central Missouri, a Carnegie Scholar, a Fulbright Senior Scholar, and former Editor of the Journal of Management Education.
