= Social facilitation =

Effect of social factors on behavior

Social facilitation is a social phenomenon in which being in the presence of others improves individual task performance. That is, people do better on tasks when they are with other people rather than when they are doing the task alone. Situations that elicit social facilitation include coaction and performing for an audience, and appears to depend on task complexity.

Norman Triplett's early investigations describe social facilitation to occur during instances of coaction, which is performing a task in the presence of other people performing a similar task, while not necessarily engaging in direct interactions with each other. Triplett first observed this in cyclists, finding that cyclists rode at faster speeds when competing against other cyclists compared to when cycling alone. Social facilitation has also been known to occur when performing a task in front of an audience, or during periods of observation, sometimes referred to as audience effects. For instance, during exercise Meumann (1904) found that when being watched, individuals could lift heavier weights compared to when they were not being watched. Research on the effects of coaction and audience effects on social facilitation have been mixed. In an attempt to discover why these types of situations do not always trigger social facilitation, Robert Zajonc (1965) theorized that perhaps task complexity, or how simple versus complex a task is, could influence whether or not social facilitation occurs.

Zajonc predicted that simple tasks would result in social facilitation within group settings, whereas more complicated tasks would not. According to Zajonc, some tasks are easier to learn and perform than others because they require dominant responses. Dominant responses are behavioral responses at the top of an organism's behavioral repertoire, making them more readily available, or 'dominant', above all other responses. Tasks that elicit dominant responses are typically simpler, less effortful, and easier to perform compared to tasks eliciting non-dominant responses. Non-dominant responses are harder to carry out. In sum, simple tasks require dominant responses whereas complex tasks require non-dominant responses. When performing tasks in groups then, simple tasks will be associated with social facilitation. However, complex tasks will not because the presence of others becomes distracting when attempting to elicit non-dominant responses that require more effort to use.

Later research develops the idea of coaction, audience effects, and task complexity. For instance, the Yerkes-Dodson law, when applied to social facilitation, states that "the mere presence of other people will enhance the performance in speed and accuracy of well-practiced tasks, but will degrade in the performance of less familiar tasks." Compared to their performance when alone, when in the presence of others they tend to perform better on simple or well-rehearsed tasks and worse on complex or new ones.

The audience effect attempts to explain psychologically why the presence of an audience leads to people performing tasks better in some cases and worse in others. This idea was further explored when some studies showed that the presence of a passive audience facilitated the better performance of a simple task, while other studies showed that the presence of a passive audience inhibited the performance of a more difficult task or one that was not well practiced, possibly due to psychological pressure or stress.

Many factors contribute to social facilitation, and many theories have been proposed to try to explain the phenomena.

== History ==
Social facilitation can be defined as a tendency for individuals to perform differently when in the mere presence of others. Specifically, individuals perform better on simpler or well-rehearsed tasks and perform worse on complex or new ones. In relation to this, there are three main empirical relationships which are the activation, evaluation, and attention theories. The activation theory describes how we are physiologically aroused and how that affects our functioning. The evaluation theory relates to the systematic assessment of the worth or merit of some object. The attention theory takes into account possession in the mind including focalization and concentration of consciousness.

In 1897, Triplett studied the effect on performance of having an audience. Triplett's experiment had a simple design; a cyclist's performance when alone was compared with a cyclist's performance when racing against another cyclist. He found that the cyclist was slowest when he was only racing the clock and not another cyclist. He attributed these results to a competitive instinct which releases energy that was not available when pedaling alone. Triplett's study started off a revolution of studies attempting to examine the theory that people's performance is influenced by the presence of others. In 1898, while studying the competitive nature of children, he found that children were much faster at completing their given activity (winding string) while they were competing, which caused him to wonder whether or not simply having another individual there would have the same effect. To determine this, Triplett studied the race time of cyclists and found that cyclists had faster race times when in the presence of other cyclists. He theorized that the faster times were because the presence of others made individuals more competitive, and further research led Triplett to theorize that the presence of others increases individuals' performances in other noncompetitive situations as well.

In 1924, Floyd Allport coined the term social facilitation. Allport conducted studies in which participants sat either alone or with other participants and did a variety of tasks such as word association tasks and multiplication assessments. He found that people performed better when in a group setting than when alone for the majority of tasks. However, at this time, social facilitation simply meant an "increase in response merely from the sight or sound of others making the same movement."

Hazel Markus of the University of Michigan conducted an experiment to test the hypothesis that the mere presence of others can influence an individual's performance. A task that lacked a rubric structure and was likely to cause the subject to be apprehensive of how they would be evaluated was used. Performance times on the task of dressing and undressing in familiar and unfamiliar clothing were compared with subjects working alone, working in the presence of a passive inattentive person, and working in the presence of an attentive spectator. Compared to the alone condition, both social conditions (audience and incidental audience) enhanced performance on the well-learned aspects of the task of dressing and undressing with the subject's own familiar clothing and hindered the subject's performance on the more complex aspects of the task of dressing and undressing using unfamiliar clothing. It was concluded that the presence of others is a sufficient condition for social facilitation and social interference effects. Therefore, the presence of an audience causes an individual to do better on a simple task or worse on a more complicated task.

In a 2010 study, donation rates increased with the presence of observers, and neuroimaging revealed that the presence of observers significantly affected activation in the ventral striatum before the choice of whether or not to donate.

In Raefeli's meta-analysis of the social facilitation phenomenon in 2002, three conclusions are made. Firstly, the presence of others heightens an individual's physiological arousal only if the individual is performing a complex task. Moreover, the mere presence of others increases the speed of simple task performance and decrease the speed of complex task performance. Lastly, social facilitation effects are surprisingly unrelated to the performer's evaluation apprehension.

A study was done in 2014 that compared the performance of individuals with autism spectrum disorder (ASD) to typically developing (TD) individuals on a task with the presence of another. The experiment conducted tested the hypothesis that an individual with ASD will respond to the presence of experimenters, thus altering the results of the experiment.

== Major theoretical approaches ==
The major three approaches to social facilitation are the activation, evaluation, and attention theories. The activation theory describes how arousal relates to social facilitation. The evaluation theory discusses how being assessed by an audience affects to social facilitation. The attention theory takes into account the effect of distractions in the environment on social facilitation.

=== Activation theory ===
In 1956, Robert Zajonc was trying to figure out why some studies showed people's performance being hindered by the presence of others rather than being made more accurate. He designed an experiment that would examine the performance of someone doing a simple vs. complex task in front of others. He found that, when people were performing a simple task in the presence of others, they could complete it with greater accuracy than when they were alone. This was something most psychologists were aware of at this time. However, what Zajonc found that was revolutionary in this time period was that, when people attempt to perform tasks which are more complex or with which they are not familiar, they complete it with less accuracy when in the presence of others than when they alone. Thus, social inhibition was born.

In 1965, Zajonc developed the stern activation theory, by proposing his generalized drive hypothesis for social facilitation. Zajonc's generalized drive hypothesis was the first theory that addressed why the presence of others increased performance sometimes yet decreased it at other times. He argued that the presence of others serves as a source of arousal, and heightened arousal increases the likelihood of an organism to do better on well-learned or habitual responses. For this reason, arousal improves performance on simple, or well-learned tasks, but impairs performance on complex, or not well-learned tasks. Zajonc's reasoning was based on the Yerkes-Dodson law, which holds that performance works like an inverse "U" function. This means that an individual's optimal drive is higher for simpler, or well-practiced tasks, and that the same individual's optimal drive is lower for more complex, or less-practiced tasks. The presence of other people further arouses us and increases our drive level, and so an individual's performance will be enhanced if a task is simple (because of the high levels of energy) but diminished if the task is complex. He tested his theories by having people complete word association tasks alone and again in the presence of others, and found that the tasks were done much faster while in the presence of others.

Other activation theories include the alertness hypothesis, the monitoring hypothesis, and the challenge and threat hypothesis.

==== Alertness hypothesis ====
The alertness hypothesis says that people are uncertain of how observers will act while in the presence of others, so they become more alert (because the performer will be uncertain about how the observers will act in the situation). It is this heightened alertness which causes them to perform better on tasks.

==== Monitoring hypothesis ====
The monitoring hypothesis posits that social facilitation effects do not occur when the performer is familiar with the observers or the situation. This is because, in those cases, the performer knows how the observer will respond or how the situation will take place. Therefore, in such situations the performer's arousal will not increase. So, if the person is unfamiliar with the observers or the situation, he/she will experience uncertainty and arousal will increase, but not if he/she is familiar with them.

==== Challenge and threat hypotheses ====
The challenge and threat hypothesis states that people perform worse on complex tasks and better on simple tasks when in the presence of others because of the type of cardiovascular response to the task. When performing a simple task in the presence of others, people show a normal cardiovascular response. However, when performing a complex task in the presence of others, the cardiovascular response is similar to that of a person in a threatening position. The normal cardiovascular response serves to improve performance, but the threat-like cardiovascular response serves to impede performance.

=== Evaluation approach ===
In 1968, Henchy and Glass proposed the evaluation approach to social facilitation. Their evaluation apprehension hypothesis states that it is not the mere presence of others that increases individual activation/arousal, but rather the fear of being evaluated by an audience. They studied the reactivity of male high school and college students, where their responses were based on the strength they developed through prior training, and found that the groups who felt their performance was being evaluated had more dominant responses than the groups who were simply in the presence of an audience without being evaluated, or those that were alone.

==== Evaluation apprehension theory ====
In 1972, Nickolas Cottrell came up with evaluation apprehension theory. This theory also explains the evaluative pressure as the source of increased productivity in presence of others rather than the arousal response identified by Zajonc. The theory assumes that people learn from experience that the source of most reward and punishments are other people they interact with. Therefore, people associate social situations with evaluation and hence, feel apprehensive in presence of other people. The evaluation apprehension improves performance on simple tasks but is debilitating in more complex and difficult tasks.

==== Self-presentation theory ====
Self-presentation theory is another evaluation approach to social facilitation. The theory posits that social facilitation is a product of people's motivation to maintain positive self-image or face in presence of others. This motivation leads people to behave in ways to form good impressions and therefore results in social facilitation in evaluative situations. In situations that were non-evaluative or less evaluative, social facilitation effects were often eliminated. In addition, when individuals were more confident, they performed better in evaluative situations in presence of others as compared to working alone.

==== Learned drive hypothesis ====
A further extension of the evaluation approach is the learned drive hypothesis, which was developed by Cottrell, Wack, Sekerak, and Rittle, and states that activation only increases when actors feel that the audience is capable of evaluating their performance. In other words, it implies that the cause of evaluation apprehension comes from a learned audience. They studied how a participant performed on well-learned tasks while in the presence of an audience focused on another event, and in the presence of an audience focused on the tasks being performed. They found that participants performing in the latter group, with the audience that was focused on what the participants were doing, largely gave dominant responses.

Weiss and Miller furthered developed the evaluation approach by hypothesizing that activation only increases when the actors fear a negative evaluation. This theory suggests that activation increases when the audience or other competitors cause negative feelings, such as anxiety, in the actor. However, Good's development of evaluation apprehension takes the opposite approach, where he hypothesizes that activation increases when actors expect a positive evaluation.

Because of the conflicting theories under the evaluation approach, there has been controversy over its reliability. A meta-analysis done by Bond found that even when individuals are in the presence of a non-visible or non-evaluative audience, activation still occurs for an increase in dominant responses.

=== Social orientation theory ===
The social orientation theory of social facilitation suggests that people differ in their orientation toward social situations and that these individual differences predicts who will show social facilitation or impairment in performance. The theory states that individuals with positive orientation are more likely to display social facilitation effects whereas individuals with negative orientation are likely to experience impairment in performance. Those with positive orientation are individuals who are self confident and who react positively to challenges. The theory states that these individuals find "safety in numbers". On the other hand, individuals with negative orientation are defined by characteristics such as low self esteem, inhibited and feeling threatened by presence of other people.

=== Attention approach ===
In the 1980s, explanations shifted from activation theories to attention theories, which imply that withdrawal from some things is necessary in order to deal effectively with others. Attention theories that explain social facilitation include the distraction-conflict hypothesis, the overload hypothesis, the feedback-loop model, and the capacity model.

==== Distraction-conflict theory ====
In his distraction-conflict theory, Robert Baron proposed that the level of performance on a task is predicted by the amount of distractions in the environment surrounding the task. The theory states distraction can be a source of social facilitation on simple tasks, as it can cause attentional conflict that can increase motivation which increases the drive proposed by Zajonc. On more complex and difficult tasks, however, the increase in drive is not enough to counteract the detrimental effects of distraction and therefore results in impaired performance.

Distraction as the source of social facilitation is demonstrated in Stroop task, a color and word association task. In Stroop task, participants are shown a color name word, printed in different color and the participants job is to provide the color of the word that the word is printed in. The reaction time is slower and more errors arise when the word and color of the word does not match. However, when the task is completed with other people, these errors decrease. In these situations the presence of others may help by narrowing the focus of attention.

==== Overload hypothesis ====
The overload hypothesis works according to the distraction-conflict hypothesis, saying that distracters do not lead to increased arousal, but rather to cognitive overload (when an individual is bombarded with excessive information in their working memory), and while in cognitive overload, individuals will do worse on complex tasks and better on more simple tasks. Performance increases on simple tasks because the performers focus their attention on the new stimuli, instead of the irrelevant stimuli that is characteristic of simple tasks. Performance decreases on complex tasks because the performers focus on the distracters, but also need to focus on the relevant stimuli that are characteristic of complex tasks, and they cannot handle all of the information they are being presented with.

==== Feedback-loop model ====
The feedback-loop model postulates that when people feel they are being observed, they focus attention on themselves. While in this state, individuals become aware of the differences between their actual behavior and anticipated behavior. So, by feedback-loop model, people do better in the presence of others because of this increased awareness about their behavior.

==== Capacity model ====
The capacity model of social facilitation focuses on the role of types of information processing on performance in front of an audience, rather than the performance on different type of tasks (simple or complex) in front of an audience. The capacity model suggests that for tasks that require automatic information processing, the presence of others does not cause problems because the short-term memory is not required for automatic information processing, so performance quality increases. However, for tasks that require controlled information processing, the presence of others does impede the level of performance because the short-term memory is necessary to both focus attention on the audience, as well as the task at hand.

=== Self-presentation approach ===
The self-presentation approach to social facilitation has two main theories: one regarding arousal or drive, and one without. The first theory argues that in the presence of an audience, individuals become concerned with self-presentation. The possible embarrassment that occurs with negative evaluation leads to activation of arousal, or increased drive which will cause more dominant effects. The second theory argues that it is not an issue of arousal, but rather of simple responses, because the individual wants to appear competent in the presence of others. If the task is easy, the individual will want to make him/herself appear even more competent by doing exceptionally well on the task. However, if the task is difficult, they will fear that they will present themselves as incompetent, which will in turn make them embarrassed, and further impede their performance.

However, there has not been significant research done or evidence supporting the self-presentation approach. The main study looking at this approach was done by Bond in 1982, but it did not include independent measures of self-presentation, so it was not able to conclusively prove the validity of this approach.

== Major empirical findings ==
=== Age ===
In 1898, Norman Triplett pioneered research on social facilitation by studying the competitive nature of children. In this study, each child was given a string and was told to wind it. He found that children performed much better while they were competing with one another, and further research led Triplett to theorize that the presence of others increases individuals' performances in other noncompetitive situations as well.

In 1973, Chapman ran an experiment and found that levels of laughter among 7–8 year-old children were highest when two children listened to funny material together (coaction condition). Furthermore, levels of laughter were higher when one child listened to funny material in the presence of another child (audience condition) than when one child listened to the funny material alone (alone condition). These results indicate that laughter is also socially facilitated.

=== Prejudice ===
Prejudice is often considered an easily learned and performed response. Therefore, following the logic of Zajonc's drive theory of social facilitation, prejudice then, is also likely to be socially facilitated. That is, individuals may be more likely to express prejudicial views in presence of others than in private.

=== Gender ===
In 1994, De Castro demonstrated that social facilitation affects food intake by extending the time spent eating a meal. His results also showed that the presence of family and friends, in comparison with the presence of mere companions, increases food intake to a greater degree, possibly due to the "release of inhibitory restraints on intake" that occurs when people feel more comfortable around people they are familiar with. Furthermore, males ate 36% more food when with other people than when alone, and females ate 40% more food when with other people than when alone. De Castro attributes this to the time-extension model of social facilitation, as the time spent at a meal increased when the meal was a social occasion. These results suggest that the presence of other people at a meal increases intake by extending the time spent at the meal, probably as a result of social interaction, and that family and friends have an even larger effect, probably by producing relaxation and a consequent disinhibition of restraint on intake. Furthermore, these results also suggest that social facilitation has very similar effects on both men and women.

=== Performance ===
In 1920, when asked to write out as many words as possible in response to a given word, 93% of participants produced more words in the presence of another person than alone. However, when this study was replicated with individuals who stuttered when they spoke, 80% of the participants produced more words when alone rather than in the presence of another person.

Lee Edward Travis conducted a study to find what kind of effect an audience has on an individual. Travis used an eye–hand coordination test (holding a flexible pointer on a revolving target) for his study. Twenty freshmen males, one sophomore male, and one junior male were used as the subjects. The small audience consisted of four to eight upper classmen and graduate students and was an equal number of men and women. Each observer practiced in the presence of the experimenter, and their learning curve was plotted each day. When the subject attained his maximum efficiency, the passive audience was brought in. Some of the subjects showed superior coordination when the audience was present.

In June 1980, Forgas et al. conducted a field study of audience effects, looking at the performance of expert and novice squash players when observed by no audience, a male audience, and a female audience. Contrary to Zajonc's drive-arousal theory, it was found that the effect of an audience on performance did not differ significantly between novice and expert players. This indicates that the other factors, such as cognitive variables and players' interpretation of the audience's presence, also influence players' reactions to the presence of an audience in a natural setting.

In 1982, people playing pool were being surreptitiously watched in order to identify skilled and unskilled players. Skilled players made at least two-thirds of their shots whereas unskilled players missed at least two-thirds of their shots. When the observer moved closer to the pool table and continued to watch, skilled players' performance improved by 14% and the unskilled players' performance dropped by more than 30%.

In 2007, Rosenbloom et al. studied archival data from Jerusalem in 2004 and found that the presence of an additional person in the car during a driving license test decreased the likelihood that the testee would pass the driving test. Although the nature of the study made it impossible to distinguish one explanation of social facilitation from another, the findings generally support the basic premise of social facilitation theory.

In 2008, college students were given a list of words and told to copy them as quickly as they could. The "easy task" was to write out one list with their dominant hand and the "hard task" was to write out another list with their nondominant hand. While completing the task, they were in the presence of an image of their favorite television personality (displayed on a computer screen) or an image of another character from the same show. When given the easy task, they wrote more words in the presence of their favorite character and when given the hard task, the favorite character inhibited their performance. As shown, while the college students were given tasks, their favorite television characters are perceived as "real" in a social facilitation paradigm which gives evidence as to how social facilitation can affect performance.

In 2008, Hill, Hanton, Matthews, and Fleming studied sub-optimal performance in sports, also known as the phenomenon of "choking". They determined that when individuals were worried about negative evaluations by the audience, and performing tasks that they were not familiar with, they often would perform at a lower level than when they did without an audience.

In 2011, Anderson-Hanley, Snyder, Nimon, and Arciero found that older adults riding "cybercycles", virtual-reality enhanced stationary bikes with interactive competitions, exercised at higher rates than adults riding stationary bikes.

In 2012, Murayama and Elliot conducted a meta-analysis where they found that the effects on performance commonly attributed to competition are actually due to performance goals. Competition prompts either performance-approach goals, which are what facilitate performance improvements, or performance-avoidance goals, which undermine performance.

=== Animals ===
Social facilitation in animals is when the performance of a behaviour by an animal increases the probability of other animals also engaging in that behaviour or increasing the intensity of the behaviour.

In 2009, Dindo, Whiten, and de Waal studied the effect of social facilitation in capuchin monkeys. The monkeys in this study were required to complete a new foraging task, either alone or in a social group. While both sets of monkeys completed the task, those in the social group completed it three times faster than those monkeys that were alone. This increase in speed was attributed to "observational learning and synchronization of behavior between group mates." This experiment lends support to the idea that the presence of others leads to social facilitation effects in animals similar to those found in humans.

In 1969, Zajonc, Heingartner, and Herman found evidence for social facilitation in animals with limited or no cognitive processing. They observed that cockroaches will reach the end of a straight runway faster in the presence of other cockroaches compared to a cockroach running the same track alone. However, a direct replication of this study in 2020 found no evidence of this social facilitation effect on the same species of cockroach.

== Electronic performance monitoring ==
Researchers have used electronic performance monitoring (EPM) to examine the effects of social facilitation. This trend had previously been limited to face-to-face or group settings, but electronic performance monitoring establishes the impact of social facilitation in a virtual sense. EPM is the utilization of information technologies (e.g. computer networks) to track, evaluate, analyze, and report information regarding an employee's performance. Many businesses have adopted this method in which workers activity is automatically monitored throughout the workday. This topic is of substantial interest to those in the field of social psychology due to underlying mechanism at work; namely, the phenomenon of social facilitation.

One study found that EPM did enhance productivity, but only in ways that are consistent with the effects of social facilitation. Employees working on a data entry task were monitored while working alone, with others, or as part of a cohesive group. Results indicated that EPM improved the performance of highly skilled workers, but interfered with the performance of those who were less skilled. Moreover, with the exception of those working in a cohesive group, monitoring was found to increase workers' feelings of stress and anxiety. On the other hand, participants responded more favorably to performance monitoring when they believed that they could turn off the monitoring and that only their job-related activities were being evaluated. Also, EPM was viewed more positively when workers were given the opportunity to participate in decisions regarding the use of the system. Results support that the effect of social facilitation is not just limited to the physical presence of others, but also extends to presence in a virtual sense as well.

In 2009, Thompson, Sebastienelli and Murray conducted an experiment to determine the effect of electronic monitoring on students who used web-based training to learn new online search skills. They found that participants who were explicitly told that their training was being monitored performed markedly worse on a post-training skills test than participants who were unaware that their training was being monitored. These findings adhere to the basic premise of social facilitation and reveal that the heightened awareness of evaluation on complex tasks significantly hinders performance.

== In educational settings ==
Groups are formed in a variety of educational settings around the world. Some examples include a group of physics students completing a laboratory exercise, a team of touch rugby players, a set of high school prefects, a group of students formed to brainstorm ideas for energy saving techniques, and study groups.

Some groups enhance members' motivation and help students stay focused on their academic goals. However, a study group may inhibit the acquisition of new information, concepts, and skills, as the presence of others can be distracting. These distractions can interfere during the early phases of learning, both in overt and covert practicing. In a study in which participants had to learn a list of words, they were too embarrassed to rehearse the material out aloud and as a consequence of this group pressure, their performance suffered.

Zajonc suggested that the student study alone, preferably in an isolated cubicle, and arrange to write examinations surrounded by many other students, on stage, and in the presence of a large audience. The results of the examination would be beyond the student's wildest expectations, assuming that the material had been thoroughly learned beforehand.

== Contributing factors ==
Contributing factors to the audience effect could include what kind of crowd is present, such as a supportive crowd (e.g., the crowd at a team's home ground) or a hostile crowd (e.g., the crowd when a team is playing an away game). Also, the proximity of the crowd or the size of the crowd could influence the result of the audience effect. More factors such as nature of the task, coping skills with potential negative effects of audience, and even the playing venue (home or away) could be things to consider when examining the audience effect.

Social facilitation is a widespread phenomenon in society. Many public tasks demonstrate the effects, both the costs and benefits, of social facilitation. From taking exams in a high school or college environment to performing in sporting events, people may perform better or fall short depending on the task's complexity. In many experiments, people display signs of social facilitation even in everyday tasks, such as driving. This effect can even be seen in animals, as displayed by Zajonc, Heingarter, and Herman's study on cockroaches.

Business can also use social facilitation to their advantage, specifically in online auctions, which takes into the account the emergence of instant messaging and communication availability technologies. The interaction between buyers and sellers in traditional, face-to-face markets creates phenomena such as social facilitation, where the presence of others impacts behaviour and performance. In the study involving Java-based Internet Dutch auction, the findings indicated that social facilitation does indeed occur and participants improve their results and stay longer in the auction under conditions of higher virtual presence. Participants also indicate a preference for auction arrangements with higher degrees of virtual presence.

== Controversies ==
Social facilitation's definition and explanations are not without controversy. Social psychologists first debate whether social facilitation in humans can be through mere presence, or whether it must be through evaluation. It was concluded that although the influence of the mere presence of others can be easily concealed by many other complex social factors, it is one of the variables that contributes to the power of others to influence an individual's performance.

One of the greatest controversies surrounding social facilitation is its origination. Psychologists continue to debate whether social facilitation is adopted through the innate biology of humans and animals, or through social learning, either from interaction with society or from individual interaction with other people, and not society in general. Further research and expansion of experiments and theories may begin to resolve, or further complicate, these issues.

In light of certain weaknesses and inadequacies of drive theory explanation, social facilitation is argued to be in need for a more cognitive approach. A more cognitive model constructed in an expectancy theory framework is shown as a plausible alternative explanation for employee performance and the effects of social facilitation. While there is not much evidence presented by this controversy it is recommended that direction of future research should test this model.

Furthermore, there is difficulty in determining which social facilitation approach is the most accurate. The biggest conflict comes between the activation (or mere presence) and evaluation approaches, with the activation approach stating that the mere presence of an audience leads to social facilitation, and the evaluation approach stating that it is the fear of being judged by a capable audience that leads to social facilitation. Despite the two clearly conflicting schools of thought, researchers have not been able to conclusively prove which one is correct.

== See also ==
- Ringelmann effect
- Social inhibition
