= Cybercycle =

Exercise game

A cybercycle is a type of exergame which combines a traditional stationary bike with virtual reality tours, competitive avatars, and videogame features.

== History ==
The term "cybercycle" has been used to refer to a futuristic vehicle in science fiction stories and video games. Stationary bicycles in combination with 2D or 3D displays have been in existence since the early days of personal computers, developing into virtual reality systems as graphic capabilities improved. Cay Anderson-Hanley of Union College and Paul Arciero of Skidmore College labeled the bicycle-virtual-reality combination a "cybercycle" in 2008 when they began conducting research on the benefits cycling exergames, to avoid referring to specific brand names.

== Cybercycles and health ==
Anderson-Hanley and Arciero's research found increased cognitive benefits when older adults used cybercycles for exercise rather than ordinary stationary bicycles. These results have been written about in news media around the world, including The Wall Street Journal, Press Association, Medscape Medical News, Additional research has been published on the benefits of cybercycling for college students and also for children on the autism spectrum.

Based on this research, some retirement communities have added cybercycles to their exercise equipment.
