= Distraction-conflict =

Concept in social psychology

Distraction-conflict (also distraction/conflict) is a term used in social psychology. Distraction-conflict is an alternative to the first tenet in Zajonc's theory of social facilitation. This first tenet currently seems to be more widely supported than the distraction-conflict model. Zajonc formulates that the presence of an individual generates arousal, and this arousal facilitates well-learned tasks and inhibits complex tasks. The distraction-conflict model states, "in the presence of others there is a conflict between attending to the person and attending to the task". The distraction-conflict model calls this attentional conflict, and says that it is responsible for the arousal of the subject.

An attentional conflict occurs between multiple stimuli when the subject is interested in paying attention to each stimulus. The task that is unrelated to the subject's primary goal is referred to as the distraction. This conflict only occurs when the pressure to attend to each input is equal and the individual's cognitive capacities to do so are inadequate.

It has been argued that the distraction-attention theory suggests that "distraction during a simple task will improve performance if it triggers attentional conflict". As with Zajonc's theory of social facilitation, the distraction-conflict theory observes that an individual's performance on simple tasks is facilitated by arousal, whereas an individual's performance on complex tasks is hindered by this same arousal. For this to occur, the level of distraction must be related to performance so that benefits of increased drive outweigh the costs of disruption. Distraction-conflict, as well as social uncertainty and self-attention, may "provoke resource overload because they absorb attentional capacity".

This model more broadly predicts that any attentional conflict will produce drive. Distraction-conflict has been supported by several studies which have produced results showing that "distractions, such as noise or flashing lights, have the same drivelike effects on task performance that audiences do". This is because "our attention is divided between the task at hand and observing the reactions of the people in the audience" in much the same way how one is distracted from the task at hand by sounds or flashing lights. The effects of distraction-conflict are also shown to be the strongest when there is a sense of urgency.

== Major empirical findings ==
In their initial research in 1978, Sanders, Baron, and Moore hypothesized that subjects would be more distracted when performing a task with a coactor or an audience than when working alone. The researchers hoped to demonstrate this through a paired-word task.

In this study, subjects first had anticipation trials on a practice list, where the lead word in a pair was presented and subject attempted to guess the attached response word. Subjects were assigned a competitional list (a complex list where the lead words were associated) or a noncompetitional list (a simple list where the pairs of words were related). An audience was introduced between the practice and subsequent test trials.

The measure of performance was the total errors divided by the word pairs on the list. The distraction experienced by the subject was measured by a self-report of task attention and the recall errors. The researchers found that the presence of audiences impaired performance on the complex list and assisted performance on the simpler task. Sanders, Baron, and Moore asserted that this data indicated increased distraction in the presence of an audience. The researchers concluded that the subject's arousal and the accompanying effects were due in part to distraction.

=== Others as distractors ===
One question surrounding this theory was what the actual source of distraction was when in the presence of another person. In 1978, Sanders, Baron, and Moore argued that distraction could occur if "subjects wanted to get social comparison information from the other person. In an experiment, they set up a copying task in three different conditions: alone, with someone else doing the same task, and with someone else doing a different task, and hypothesized that only in the case where the other person present was doing the same task would social comparison, and therefore distraction, be occurring. The researchers hypothesized people are distracting because of the pressure to engage in social comparison, and this pressure enhances social facilitation effects.

Participants performed a copying task in two conditions. Some participants were told the study was about their impressions of the task, so that the subject experienced little comparison pressure. The other participants were told the study was about the ability to defer gratification, thus making it likely students would compare their performances with a coactor.

Sanders, Baron, and Moore found that subjects were motivated to compare their performances with coactors, causing distraction. They observed that social facilitation effects were connected to this distraction.

== Recent findings ==
Huguet et al. (1999) examined the effects of social presence in the Stroop test. The researchers had participants complete this task alone or with a coactor. This coactor worked on the task more slowly, worked at the same speed, or worked faster than the participant. The researchers found that Stroop interference decreased for participants who worked with a similarly paced or more quickly paced coactor. The results indicate that participants engaged in social comparison with the coactor, and that this comparison created distraction.

A 2004 study performed by Muller, Atzeni, and Butera found support for the attentional conflict hypothesis of the distraction-conflict model. Subjects were randomly assigned a condition: alone, upward social comparison (the coactor was better at task) or downward social comparison (the coactor was worse at task) and were asked to complete a task indicating the presence of "$" in various pictures. The researchers found that coaction decreased the errors committed by the subjects when in the condition of upward social comparison. The authors concluded that it is possible for coactors to be objects of social comparison, and thus, distracting.

== Shortcomings of the distraction-conflict model ==
The major shortcomings of distraction-conflict theory result from limitations in data and possible alternative interpretations. The 1978 study performed by Sanders, Baron, and Moore recognizes that the outcomes do not establish distraction as the only feature increasing arousal. Furthermore, the authors note:

The measures [of distraction] did not correlate significantly with each other or with performance; they often did not produce significant differences between conditions; they occasionally failed to parallel and even reversed the trends from relevant performance data.

Current research has not yet definitely identified distraction as the primary cause of increased drive.
