= Cog's ladder =

Cog's ladder of group development is based on the work, "Cog's Ladder: A Model of Group Growth", by George O. Charrier, an employee of Procter and Gamble, published in a company newsletter in 1972. The original document was written to help group managers at Procter and Gamble better understand the dynamics of group work, thus improving efficiency. It is now also used by the United States Naval Academy, the United States Air Force Academy, and other businesses – to help in understanding group development.

== Stages ==
The basic idea of Cog's ladder is that there are five steps necessary for a small group of people to be able to work efficiently together. These stages are the polite stage, the why we're here stage, the power stage, the cooperation stage and the esprit stage. Groups can only move forward after completing the current stage as in Jean Piaget's stage model.

=== Polite stage ===
An introductory phase where members strive to get acquainted or reacquainted with one another. During this phase, the basis for the group structure is established and is characterized by polite social interaction. All ideas are simple, controversy is avoided and all members limit self-disclosure. Judgements of other members are formed, and this sets the tone for the rest of the group's time.

=== Why we're here stage ===
Group members will want to know why they have been called together. The specific agenda for each planning session will be communicated by the moderator or leader. In this phase, individual need for approval begins to diminish as the members examine their group's purpose and begin to set goals. Often, social cliques will begin to form as members begin to feel as though they "fit in."

=== Power stage ===
Bids for power begin between group members in an effort to convince each other that their position on an issue is correct. Often, the field of candidates vying for leadership narrows, as fewer members strive to establish power. Some of those who contributed freely to the group discussion in earlier stages now remain silent, wishing not to engage in a power struggle. It is noted that interactions arising out of this phase do not usually result in optimum solutions. Hence, there is a great need for structure and patience in this stage.*

=== Cooperation stage ===
Members not only begin to accept that others have an opinion worth expressing, but a team spirit replaces vested interests. Often, new levels of creativity are achieved, and the group's productivity soars. If new individuals are introduced into the membership at this point, they will be viewed as outsiders or intruders, and the group will have to evolve again, much as it did initially.

=== Esprit stage ===
Esprit de corps: a golden rule by Henri Fayol is closely associated with this stage of Cog's, which says that nothing has higher pinnacles to reach than spirit of corps.

Mutual acceptance with high cohesiveness and a general feeling of esprit. Charrier states that the planning team can do its finest work and be most productive in this final stage in the model. It is also noted that this stage will not always be achieved; however, for this level of cooperation, as well as productivity, the other four stages must be met.

== Comparisons ==
Cog's ladder is very similar to Tuckman's stages, another stage model of groups, which lacks the "Why We're Here" stage, and calls the remaining four stages "Forming", "Storming", "Norming", and "Performing". There are also other similar models, some of which are cyclic rather than reaching an end state.
