= Social tuning =

Adopting another person's attitudes for social cohesion

Social tuning, the process whereby people adopt other people's attitudes, is cited by social psychologists to demonstrate an important lack of people's conscious control over their actions.

The process of social tuning is particularly powerful in situations where one person wants to be liked or accepted by another person or group. However, social tuning occurs both when people meet for the first time, as well as among people who know each other well. Social tuning occurs both consciously and subconsciously. As research continues, the application of the theory of social tuning broadens.

Social psychology bases many of its concepts on the belief that a person's self concept is shaped by the people with whom he or she interacts. Social tuning allows people to learn about themselves and the social world through their interactions with others. People mold their own views to match those of the people surrounding them through social tuning in order to develop meaningful relationships. These relationships then play an integral role in developing one's self-esteem and self-concept.

== Theoretical approaches ==
Social tuning theory describes the process whereby people adopt another person's attitudes or opinions regarding a particular subject. This phenomenon is also termed "shared reality theory." The study of this occurrence began in 1902 when Charles Cooley coined the term "looking glass self", stating that people see themselves and their own social world through the eyes of others. Research further discovered that people create their self-images through their beliefs of how others perceive them. Many people adopt the views of those surrounding them in an effort to feel like they belong and feel liked. In 1934, Mead determined that not only do individuals shape their self-concepts according to the perspectives of others, but also that people's views of themselves are continually maintained according to these adopted ideas.

Later research showed that social tuning tends to be a particularly strong phenomenon when two people want to get along with each other. This is shown through social bonds which can be strengthened and reinforced through a perceived sense of shared beliefs. In addition, these shared ideas create a person's comprehension of their environment and world as a whole. Individuals believe that they have the same attitudes regarding certain ideas and experiences as the other.

One particular aspect of social tuning, stereotyping, has been a popular theme in this field's research over time. One specific method explores the idea that individuals of a certain group are influenced by the ideas of others from the out-group (Crocker, Major & Steele, 1998). These interactions yield the particular stereotyped group to internalize and believe the way others view them. Therefore, self-stereotyping manifests in certain individuals. However, in this case, the presence of self-stereotyping is immensely determined by the relationship with whom the stereotyped individual interacts with.

In 2006, Sinclair and Huntsinger explored the idea of why other people will change their beliefs and attitudes in order to get along with others and feel accepted. Their research focuses on why individuals from targeted groups will act and behave according to "cultural stereotypes". They used two hypotheses originally coined by Hardin & Conley in 2001, "Affiliative Social-Tuning" and "Domain Relevance Hypothesis". The first of these, "Affiliative Social-Tuning Hypothesis", pertains to the idea that certain concepts will be shared between individuals especially when affiliative motivation is high. For example, in a situation with a member from a targeted group and a member from a neutral group, the former will act accordingly to how the latter stereotypes his group. However, this is contingent on the fact that affiliative motivation is high, in other words, if there is a desire for the former to create a bond with the latter. The second, "Domain Relevance Hypothesis", explains that "when confronted with multiple applicable views on which to construct a shared understanding with another person, an individual will choose to social tune toward only those views that will lead to the development of the most precise shared understanding with the person". In other words, when many views are available to be socially tuned between individuals, only certain concepts will be shared. The concepts chosen are the ideas that yield the best common understanding between the two individuals.

== Empirical approaches ==
One of the most famous experiments demonstrating the social tuning phenomenon was done by Stacey Sinclair. Her research reveals the effect of likability on people's drive to social tune. Participants engaged with researchers who were either likable or non-likable and who were either wearing a shirt stating anti-racist thoughts, specifically a shirt with the word "Eracism", or a blank shirt. The participants were then asked to complete a subconscious prejudice test, and when the researcher was likable, participants demonstrated significantly less racist attitudes on the test, than if that researcher was unlikable. Since the participants seemed to shape their views to that of the experimenter only when he or she was "likable", this study can be shown to reveal that people are more prone to adopt the views of others through social tuning when they like that person. This aspect of social tuning could be explained by the psychological assumption that people want to be liked by those that they themselves like, and therefore people will shape their views to match those of a person from whom they seek social acceptance.

A similar study by Janetta Lun demonstrates another aspect of social tuning with respect to racism, and suggests that people who do not already hold strong beliefs about social prejudice are more likely to socially tune their beliefs with others around them than those who do already hold strong opinions. In this study, participants were given an implicit attitude test to determine their existing levels of implicit prejudice. Next they were taken into another room with either an experimenter who had the word "ERACISM" on their shirt, or with an experimenter in a plain T-shirt for the control condition. In the first condition, participants were asked to read the word "ERACISM" off the experimenter's T-shirt, and then in the control they were asked to read a series of nonsense letters. They were then given another implicit attitudes test to determine their implicit prejudice.

Lun found that people who had less accessible attitudes (determined by the first implicit attitudes test) had lower implicit prejudice after interacting with the experimenter who held clear egalitarian views. Alternatively, those who already held strong beliefs about prejudice did not change their implicit prejudice after interacting with the egalitarian experimenter. This study demonstrates that when individuals do not hold already strong beliefs, they are more likely to seek knowledge from those around them, and therefore more likely to engage in social tuning. Lun's experiment suggests the likelihood of social tuning when people seek knowledge on a particular subject. In this case, the participants who did not hold strong opinions on the subject of prejudice, and thus presumably had less knowledge on the subject, molded their opinions to match the information they were given by the experimenter in the form of the word "ERACISM" on her shirt, and therefore they demonstrated stronger egalitarian views than they had when initially arriving at the experiment. People who are uncomfortable in situations where they feel they do not have enough information will attempt to get information through their interactions with others. Lun's experiment reveals how social tuning is a part of such a process, in which people with less knowledge are more likely to mold their beliefs to that of others.

Further research by Aaron Root has been completed, examining opinions on homosexuality. During this experiment, the researcher, who always wore a pro-homosexuality shirt, followed a script that was designed to control the participant's desire to get along with the researcher. In the high-level condition, the experimenter was friendly and amiable; he offered candy at the beginning of the study and spoke enthusiastically about the experiment. In the low-level condition, the experimenter's dialogue was concise (to the point of rudeness) and he even made a point of putting away the candy basket without offering any. To emphasize this action, the experimenter made a comment about not knowing why the other experimenters insisted on giving candy out. In the trials with an amicable experimenter, the participants were more gay-friendly on the implicit attitudes tests. The opposite resulted from the interaction with a less-likable experimenter. The subject would adopt the views of the message printed on the experimenter's shirt if he was nicer.

Curtis Hardin, co-author of "Shared Reality, System Justification, and the Relational Basis of Ideological Beliefs", has performed numerous experiments in social tuning across a wide variety of ideals. His experiments explore how individual experience reflects a kind of tension among relationships. In one experiment, automatic homophobic attitudes manifest in the participant after an interaction with an evidently gay experimenter, but only for subjects who do not have gay friends. In another study by Hardin, unconscious threats to religious experience reduce commitment for participants who do not share the experience with their father or minister. For those who do perceive the religious experience to be shared, the unconscious threat causes increased religious commitment. In a third study, people become more anti-black when they are included (as opposed to excluded) in a game played with ostensible racists. The effect is reversed when the participants have are extra motivated to engage with the racists. Similar studies have been performed with gender.

In an experiment by Hardin and Higgins (1996), participants were given information about a "target" which they would inform a perceived audience about. The "communicators" changed the different summaries of information (sometimes to incorrect information) to best correspond with the attitudes of the audience which they were informed of by the researchers. The motivation of the communicator determined the extent to which they would alter their message to suit the audience. However, the communicator soon began believing their edited information about the target as a direct source of information. The memory and beliefs towards the target were then influenced. As time passed, communicators' belief that their message as a source of information about the target increased and their memory was altered. Thus the communicator adopted the believed beliefs of the audience which he was trying to inform.

== Applications ==
Social tuning has resounding influences on both the memory and cognition of those affected by this process. Though social tuning could potentially aid memory and cognition should the views of the other person be correct, this phenomenon could also impede memory and cause incorrect cognition. For example, if an individual seeks a relationship with another individual who holds negative opinions about homosexuality, the first individual could be at risk for mirroring those negative opinions in order to be liked by the second individual. Such phenomenon can be harmful, in that they can cause people to hold opinions on subjects that are not based on concrete information, but on the opinions of others.

== Controversies ==
Social tuning can be particularly strong when in relation to controversial topics. Judgments based on sexual orientation, race, religion and even a politics can be substantially altered based on the opinions of those around a subject. The result being that it is not only highly unlikely that a subject would openly disagree with these feelings, but actually adopt them and proclaim them as genuinely their own. In addition, social tuning is a large contributor to prejudice and racism. For example, many individuals adopt their views about race or about their out-groups according to the ideas of those surrounding them. Social tuning with respect to race often occurs through parental influence. A child without sufficient information about race, and who seeks the approval of his or her parent will likely shape their own beliefs about race based on the beliefs of their parents.

As noted earlier (see "Major Theoretical Approaches"), self tuning has been linked to many issues regarding stereotyping. For example, individuals of commonly stereotyped groups are at risk of social tuning in certain situations. For example, Michael Inzlicht coined the term "threatening environments", which pertain to occasions when individuals perceive that they are being "devalued, stigmatized, or discriminated against" by a non-stereotyped group. In this environment, it is common that the individuals of a perceived "lower-status" will social tune to the ideas of the "higher-status". This results in internalized racism of the former group. However, it has been noted that under certain conditions interactions between heterogeneous groups can result more in a more positive manner. For example, situations that are perceived as "safe and nonthreatening", by both the stigmatized and non-stigmatized group "are likely to lead to positive self-expansion and social tuning, reduced prejudice and discrimination, and positive group attitudes".

On the other hand, research has shown that self tuning to ideas of one's ingroup, and not one's outgroup can often lead to more damaging results. Due to the fact that members of the same group are closer and trust one another, they are more likely to tune to the ideas of each other. Therefore, a member that holds a negative self-stereotype of himself and his own group is more dangerous to his comrades than an individual on the outside who shares the same views. Research has been conducted on how an individual from a stereotyped group can best avoid the dangers of self-tuning from an out-group. As Sinclair suggests, "members of stigmatized groups need to be careful with whom they develop relationships", and thus they "can reduce the likelihood of negative social tuning by remaining interpersonally distant from those with stereotypical views".

== Conclusion ==
Social tuning is an intriguing social phenomenon that affects our personal beliefs and views both on a long-term and short-term basis. It impacts many important aspects of an individual's life, and can even play a role in determining a person's beliefs on a variety of important subjects. For example, it plays a large role in our self-concept and our views of others. There are certain situations which heighten the likelihood that a person will engage in social tuning, for example when an individual wants to be liked by another or when an individual does not already hold strong opinions on a subject. Overall, social tuning is an important social psychological theory as it explains the many beliefs we hold about ourselves, others, and the world around us.
