= Evaluation apprehension model =

The evaluation apprehension theory was proposed by Nickolas B. Cottrell in 1972. He argued that we quickly learn that the social rewards and punishments (for example, in the form of approval and disapproval) that we receive from other people are based on their evaluations of us. On this basis, our arousal may be modulated. In other words, performance will be enhanced or impaired only in the presence of persons who can approve or disapprove of our actions.

For example, a person who is trying out for cheerleading will feel a heightened sense of arousal leading to incompetence not just because others are around, but because of the fear that others are observing and ridiculing them.

Feelings of concern about evaluation nearly always occur when in the presence of others. However, in 1968, Cottrell tried to separate these variables in an experiment. He found that there was no social facilitation effect on three well-learned tasks performed by a participant when there were two other persons (part of the study) blindfolded and supposedly preparing for a perception study. The participants would perform the same as the participants who were to perform the three well-learned tasks alone. Dominant responses (sharper and quicker) were given mainly by participants who had to perform the three tasks in the presence of spectators who seemed interested and who were able to see the participant perform the tasks.

People may experience evaluation apprehension when they are part of a negatively stereotyped group and involved in a stereotype-linked activity. For example, women taking a math test may not perform to their full potential because of concerns regarding women's stereotyped difficulties with math. In this situation, evaluation apprehension is called stereotype threat. Stereotype threat can also occur in private, whereas evaluation apprehension cannot.

Evaluation apprehension can affect subjects' behavior in psychological experiments, and can lead to invalid causal inference. Rosenberg defined evaluation apprehension as "an active, anxiety-toned concern that he [the subject] win a positive evaluation from the experimenter, or at least that he provide no grounds for a negative one." As a result, subjects have conformed less in conformity studies and exhibited quicker conditioning in conditioning studies as part of a positive self-presentation.

Other research on evaluation apprehension has shown that, when they must make a choice, subjects are more concerned with presenting themselves in a favorable light (this has been called the apprehensive hypothesis, the "good subject role").

Concern with giving a positive self-presentation is also implicit in the social desirability bias. This bias is the tendency to give the "socially desired response" (e.g., a response that would typically be considered well-adjusted) in answering items on personality measures. This response set is important for personality researchers because it threatens valid interpretation of test results.

== The manipulation of evaluation apprehension ==
To study the causal influence of evaluation apprehension in experimental designs, experimenters frequently have to try to manipulate this variable. By creating differing levels of evaluation apprehension, researchers can assess its effect on, and interaction with, other variables, such as self-esteem and manifest anxiety. To heighten participants' evaluation apprehension, experimenters create situations in which participants perceive themselves as being publicly judged. For example, Kim et al. (2010)'s tested the effect of apprehension on making positive self-evaluations. Specifically, they studied the effect of evaluation apprehension between two groups: people from collectivistic cultures and people from individualistic cultures. To manipulate evaluation apprehension, they raised and lowered the level of evaluation apprehension depending on if participants were alone or with a group of people when they were asked to make positive self-evaluations.

An indirect manipulation of evaluation apprehension is demonstrated in Leary et al. (1987)'s study of evaluation apprehension on social-esteem and self-esteem. One's social-esteem is how one is evaluated by others, or at least how one perceives that one is being perceived by others. Until recently, scholars hypothesized that the model of social-esteem directly contrasted the model of self-esteem, one's evaluation of oneself. There is some consensus that social-esteem is influenced by evaluation apprehension given that they are both related to a person's apprehension of being evaluated by others. However, recent research shows that evaluation apprehension can also influence general self-esteem. Leary et al. conducted an experiment in which participants were told that they would be taking a test that could threaten their ego and that either "only they, only another individual, both they and the other individual, or no one would see their test score". By varying the perceived audience, the researchers indirectly manipulated evaluation apprehension. Leary et al. thus hoped to create conditions that tested the effects of differing levels of evaluation apprehension on social-esteem and self-esteem. Before the test began, the participants were all assessed on their level of evaluation apprehension. The purpose of the study was then to determine how one's evaluation apprehension was affected by a threat to one's self-esteem, social-esteem, both, or neither.

The results of Leary et al. (1987)'s study showed a significant increase in evaluation apprehension for participants with both the self-viewing condition and the peer-viewing condition. Participants in the peer-viewing condition were told that they would be evaluated by others; participants in the self-viewing condition were told that they would be evaluated by themselves. This effect was similarly found for the self-viewing and social-viewing condition, but not for the condition in which no one would view the results. These results demonstrate that one may be able to alter evaluation apprehension by manipulating social-esteem and self-esteem.

== Evaluation apprehension as a moderator ==
Recent research has shown that there is a negative correlation between social desirability and manifest anxiety. Studies have demonstrated that evaluation apprehension may moderate this relationship. When evaluation apprehension is lowered, a much smaller relationship between these two variables is found. Therefore, evaluation apprehension is positively correlated to the relationship between social desirability and manifest anxiety. This does not imply that evaluation apprehension is the reason why a person has more anxiety when they have more social desirability. However, this correlation does imply that someone with high desirability is more likely to have manifest anxiety when there is high evaluation apprehension rather than in cases of low evaluation apprehension.

Other studies have revealed that there is a relationship between collectivism and corruption. Recent research has shown that evaluation apprehension may moderate this association. Collectivistic values and one's willingness to act in a corrupted way positively correlate in some studies and negatively correlate in others. Researchers are unsure how to interpret these mixed results. However, Huang et al. (2015) believed that evaluation apprehension was the third variable that was moderating the relationship. They hypothesized that there would be a negative correlation between collectivism and corruption when evaluation apprehension was high because of the fear of being judged for being corrupt by the other people of one's culture. On the other hand, they hypothesized that there would be a positive correlation when evaluation apprehension was low because people would have low fear of judgment from others for being corrupt. Therefore, the researchers conducted an experiment that tested the relationship between collectivism and corruption with the independent variable being evaluation apprehension. All of the conditions in the experiment contained situations where collectivistic values and one's willingness to act corruptly were tested, the conditions only differed in the amount of evaluation apprehension they contained. Numerous experiments were completed by Huang et al. and the experiment based on bribery scenarios found corroborating results with the experiment based on a bribery game containing real money. Both experiments produced significant results which indicate that collectivism only facilitated corruption when there was low evaluation apprehension. Although this is only one study, the fact that high levels of evaluation apprehension inhibit collectivism facilitating corruption provides further supporting evidence that evaluation apprehension can sometimes act as a moderator.

== The effects of evaluation apprehension on behavior ==
The presence of evaluation apprehension can cause some people to act abnormally. Their behavior may be altered from the norm by increasing evaluation apprehension even if the rest of the context remains unchanged. Evaluation apprehension can change behavior both beneficially and detrimentally in laboratory and work settings. Recent research has suggested that at times the true effects of a treatment being tested in an experiment can be influenced by evaluation apprehension. Sometimes, the participants' knowledge that they are in an experiment leads them to experience evaluation apprehension. Their apprehensive feelings of being evaluated results in them acting in a different manner than they would in normal life, thereby leading to false data.

Evaluation apprehension can affect the behavior of people differently depending on their culture and other factors. Research indicates that evaluation apprehension is a primary determinant of individual differences in the ability to make positive self-evaluations among Western and Eastern cultures. Western cultures tend to be more individualistic in nature and therefore the people of those cultures have an easier time making public, positive self-evaluations. The individualistic nature of those cultures encourages people who reside in them to make public, positive self-evaluations because of a lack of social/societal judgment when they do. Eastern cultures, on the other hand, tend to be more collectivistic in nature and therefore the people of those cultures are less likely to make public, positive self-evaluations than they are to make private self-evaluations. This may be due to evaluation apprehension. The collectivistic nature of those cultures discourages praising oneself, so such people are discouraged from public self-praise from fear of being evaluated negatively. Studies have revealed that when these people are in a more private setting where they do not have evaluation apprehension they are more likely to make positive self-evaluations.

== Benefits and detriments of evaluation apprehension ==
Although it is commonly believed that evaluation apprehension is largely detrimental, research demonstrates that evaluation apprehension can have both positive and negative effects on social interactions. Evaluation apprehension can be useful at times in spite of its tendency to create anxiety. At high levels, evaluation apprehension can inform people that the situation is important and that they should focus attention on whatever stressor is causing the heightened levels of evaluation apprehension. Research indicates that a person is less easily distracted when they have a heightened level of evaluation apprehension and can therefore be more easily persuaded. Eliminating such distraction creates a higher level of understanding of the presented argument. At the same time, this heightened level of attention can create anxiety. Thus, evaluation apprehension leads to an amplified level of attention that is both beneficial and detrimental.

== See also ==
- Audience effect
- Drive theory
