= Facilitator =

Person who helps a group understand common objectives & reach them

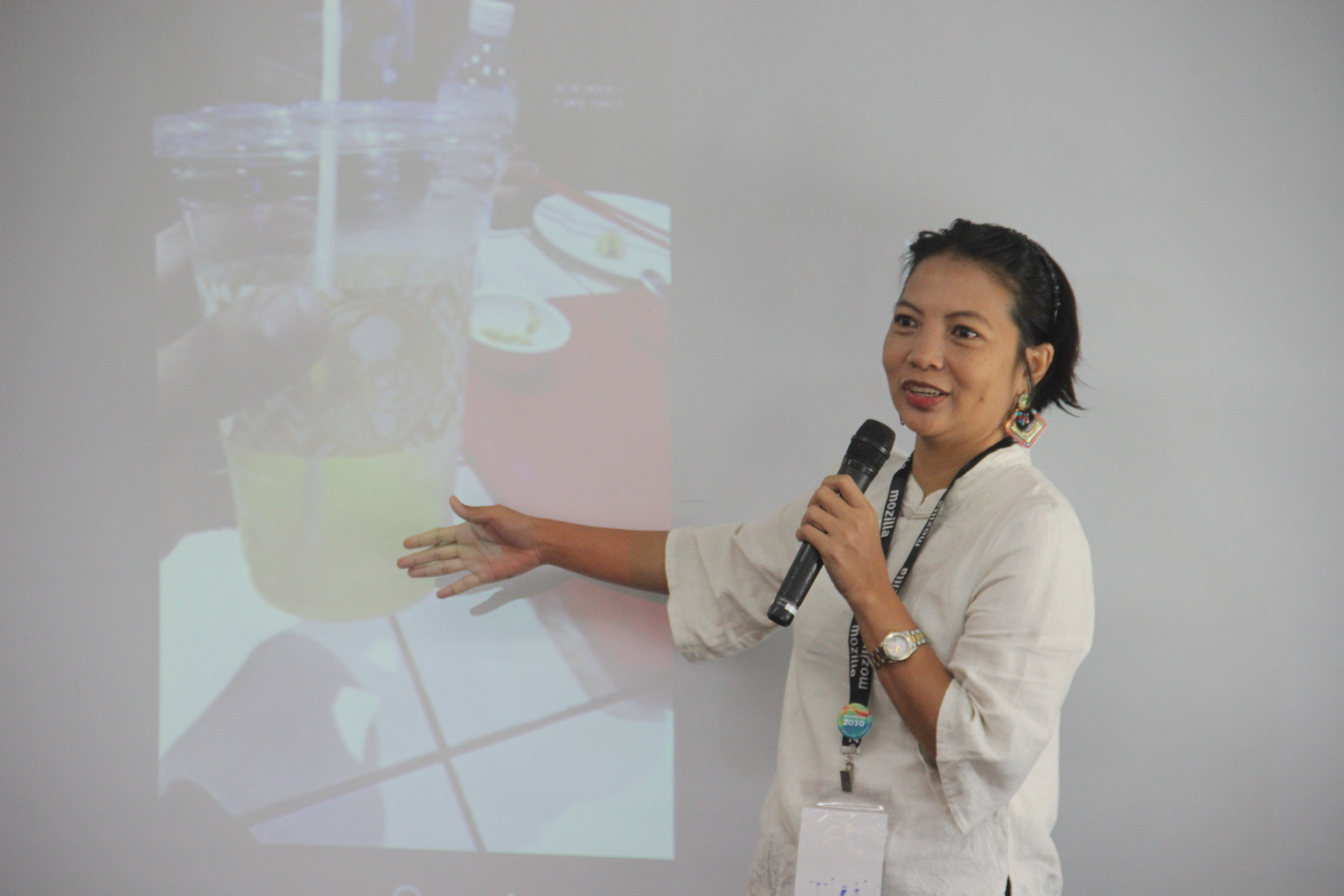
A facilitator leading a discussion at a summit meeting

A facilitator is a person who helps a group of people to work together better, understand their common objectives, and plan how to achieve these objectives, during meetings or discussions. In doing so, the facilitator remains "neutral", meaning they do not take a particular position in the discussion. Some facilitator tools will try to assist the group in achieving a consensus on any disagreements that preexist or emerge in the meeting so that it has a solid basis for future action.

== Definitions ==
There are a variety of definitions for facilitator:

- "An individual who enables groups and organizations to work more effectively; to collaborate and achieve synergy. He or she is a 'content neutral' party who by not taking sides or expressing or advocating a point of view during the meeting, can advocate for fair, open, and inclusive procedures to accomplish the group's work" – Michael Doyle
- "One who contributes structure and process to interactions so groups are able to function effectively and make high-quality decisions. A helper and enabler whose goal is to support others as they pursue their objectives." – I. Bens, p.viii.
- "The facilitator's job is to support everyone to do their best thinking and practice. To do this, the facilitator encourages full participation, promotes mutual understanding and cultivates shared responsibility. By supporting everyone to do their best thinking, a facilitator enables group members to search for inclusive solutions and build sustainable agreements" – Kaner et al

== Authority ==
The concept of authority (of the facilitator) is one which can cause confusion. John Heron espouses three alternates (initially in the educational context) as being:

- Tutelary authority – based on the credentials, competences and skills of the tutor/facilitator. A professor with a PhD in her specialty brought in to a facilitate a meeting would get tutelary authority from her knowledge and credentials.
- Political authority – involving the exercise of decision-making with respect to the objectives, programme, methods, resources and assessment of learning. This manifests particularly in the planning dimension.
- Charismatic authority – influence by presence, style and manner. It manifests particularly through the feeling, confronting and valuing dimensions.

== Types ==
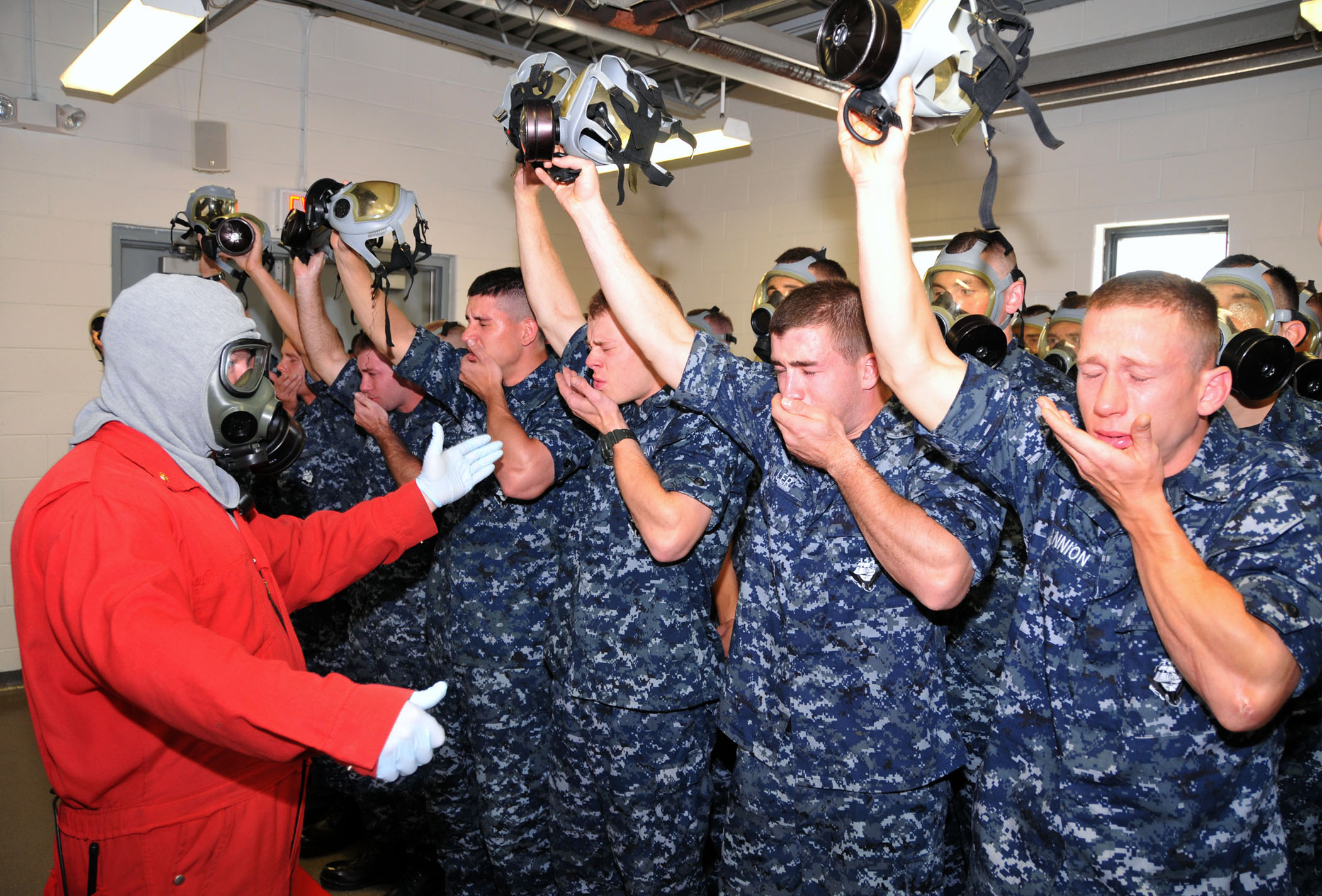
US Navy training facilitator in action

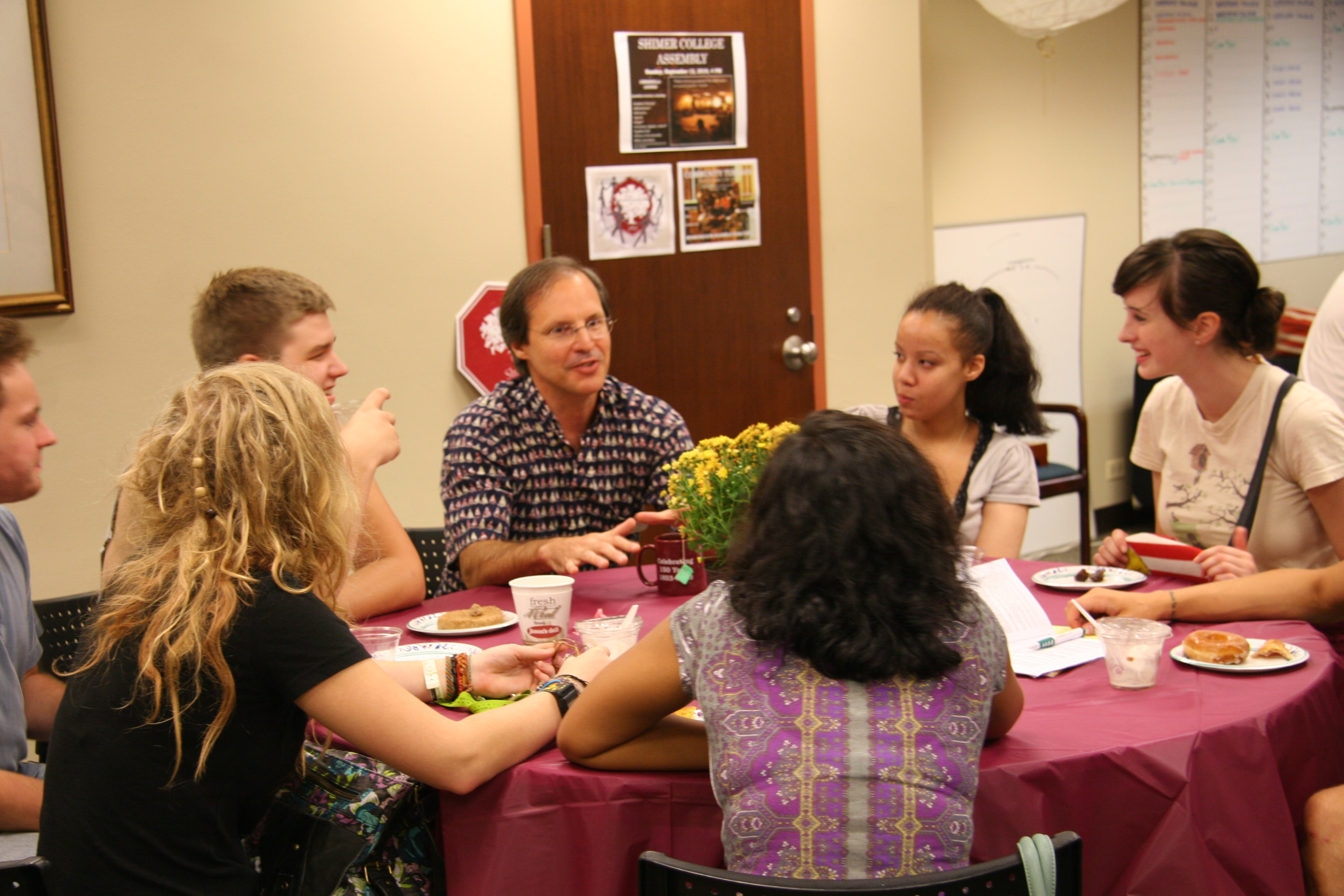
Shimer College facilitator conversing with students

=== Business facilitators ===
Business facilitators work in business, and other formal organizations but facilitators may also work with a variety of other groups and communities. It is a tenet of facilitation that the facilitator will not lead the group towards the answer that they think is best even if they possess an opinion on the facilitation subject. The facilitator's role is to make it easier for the group to arrive at its own answer, decision, or deliverable.

This can and does give rise to organizational conflict between hierarchical management and theories and practice of empowerment. Facilitators often have to navigate between the two, especially where overt statements about empowerment are not being borne out by organizational behaviors.

=== Conflict resolution facilitators ===
Conflict resolution facilitators are used in peace and reconciliation processes both during and after a conflict. They support constructive and democratic dialogue between groups with diverse and usually diametrically opposite positions. Conflict resolution facilitators must be impartial to the conflicting groups (or societies) and must adhere to the rules of democratic dialogue. They may not take sides or express personal opinions. Their role is to support groups develop shared vision for the future, learn to listen to each other, and understand and appreciate the feelings, experiences and positions of the opposing side.

=== Educational facilitators ===
Educators in dialogic learning and other peer instruction approaches often serve as facilitators. According to one common definition, an educational facilitator has the same level of knowledge about both education and the subject matter as a teacher, but works with the goal of having students take as much responsibility for their own learning as possible. Instructors at Shimer College, for example, are often referred to as facilitators due to their role in provoking learning by facilitating a conversation among students about the text rather than instructing the students directly. In language teaching, teachers may shift to a facilitative role to increase student ownership of the learning process. Effective facilitation requires self-monitoring and careful attention to the details of interaction as well as the content of the material.

=== Small group facilitators ===
Facilitators can help participants in small and medium-sized groups to work through a meeting agenda. The facilitator is often appointed in place of what would once have been a chairperson's role. Along with other officers, the facilitator is appointed at the group's annual general meeting to fill the role for the year ahead. Groups that have adopted this model include prayer groups, men's groups, writing groups and other community organisations.

=== Training facilitators ===
Training facilitators are used in adult education. These facilitators are not always subject experts, and attempt to draw on the existing knowledge of the participant(s), and to then facilitate access to training where gaps in knowledge are identified and agreed on. Training facilitators focus on the foundations of adult education: establish existing knowledge, build on it and keep it relevant. The role is different from a trainer with subject expertise. Such a person will take a more leading role and take a group through an agenda designed to transmit a body of knowledge or a set of skills to be acquired. (See tutelary authority above.)

=== Wraparound facilitators ===
Wraparound facilitators are facilitators in the social services community. The term "wraparound" refers to the broad, holistic approach used by the facilitators, taking into account a range of factors. They originally served disabled teens who were transitioning into adulthood. Now they include facilitators serving children between the ages of 0–3 years who are in need of services. Outside the meetings, the facilitator organizes meetings, engages team members and conducts follow through. During meetings the facilitator leads and manages the team by keeping the participants on track and encourages a strength-based discussion addressing the child's needs. The facilitator encourages equal participation among team members.

== Skills ==
See Facilitation (business) for a view of specific skills and activities.

Many skills are required to be a good facilitator. The basic skills of a facilitator are about following good meeting practices: timekeeping, following an agreed-upon agenda, and keeping a clear record. The higher-order skills involve watching the group and its individuals in light of group dynamics. In addition, facilitators also need a variety of listening skills including ability to paraphrase; stack a conversation; draw people out; balance participation; and make space for more reticent group members (Kaner, et al., 1996). It is critical to the facilitator's role to have the knowledge and skill to be able to intervene in a way that adds to the group's creativity rather than taking away from it.

A successful facilitator must respect others and be aware of the group's dynamics.

In the event that a consensus cannot be reached then the facilitator would assist the group in understanding the differences that divide it.

Facilitators also require good understanding of processes – how to enable group decision-making, structuring agendas for appropriate results, problem-solving, etc.

== Associations and organizations ==
The International Association of Facilitators (IAF) was founded in 1994 to promote and support facilitation as a profession. The IAF maintains the Certified Professional Facilitator program. The competencies of a Certified Professional Facilitator can be found on the IAF website. These core competencies are: (1) Create collaborative client relationships; (2) Plan appropriate group processes; (3) Create and sustain a participatory environment; (4) Guide group to appropriate and useful outcomes; (5) Build and maintain professional knowledge and; (6) Model positive professional attitude.

The International Institute for Facilitation (INIFAC) was founded in 2003 to maintain and promote a program of certification for facilitation, the Certified Master Facilitator program. The competencies of a Certified Master Facilitator can be found on the INIFAC website.

== See also ==
- Meeting
- Process consultant

== Bibliography ==
- Bens, I. Facilitating With Ease!: A Step-by-Step Guidebook with Customizable Worksheets on CD-ROM, (2000) Jossey-Bass, ISBN 0-7879-5194-3
- Group Facilitation: A Research and Applications Journal, IAF, ISSN 1534-5653 (Print) & ISSN 1545-5947 (Online)
- Hogan, C.F. (1999), Facilitating Learning, Melbourne, Australia: Eruditions, ISBN 1-86491-005-4
- Hogan, C.F. (2000), Facilitating Empowerment, London: Kogan Page, ISBN 978-0749432973
- Hogan, C.F. (2002), Understanding Facilitation, London: Kogan Page, ISBN 0 7494 3826 6
- Hogan, C.F. (2003), Practical Facilitation, London: Kogan Page, ISBN 0 7494 3827 4
- Hogan, C.F. (2007), Facilitating Multicultural Groups: A Practical Guide, London: Kogan Page, ISBN 0749444924
- Kaner, S. with Lind, L., Toldi, C., Fisk, S. and Berger, D. Facilitator's Guide to Participatory Decision-Making, (2007) Jossey-Bass; ISBN 0-7879-8266-0
- Schuman, S. (Ed) The IAF Handbook of Group Facilitation: Best Practices from the Leading Organization in Facilitation, (2005) Jossey-Bass ISBN 0-7879-7160-X
- Schuman, S. (Ed) Creating a Culture of Collaboration: The IAF Handbook, (2006) Jossey-Bass ISBN 0-7879-8116-8
- Schwarz, R. The Skilled Facilitator, (3rd Edition 2017) Jossey-Bass ISBN 978-1119064398
- Seifert, J.W. Visualisation – Presentation – Facilitation: Translation of the German Classic, (2012) Gabal, ISBN 978-3-86936-394-3
- Wilkinson, M. The Effective Facilitator, (2004) Jossey-Bass ISBN 0-7879-7578-8
