= Political identity development =

Political identity development focuses on the process by which an individual decides on how they define themselves. Political identity development is the process how an individual decides on their identity around political issues. Political identity is not limited to partisan identification, but deals with many aspects of how individuals define their political beliefs, attitudes, issue preferences and how an individual relates to their political environment.

== History of identity development ==
Erik Erikson's original work on identity development (1968) focused on how young people develop their ego identity through crisis and individuation, meaning how the individual distinguishes themselves from others. James Marcia expanded Erik Erikson's work on identity development and expanded identity into different roles such as occupational, religious, relationship, and political identities.

Marcia argued that individuals went through identity statuses: Identity Diffusion, Moratorium, Foreclosure, and Achievement. However, Marcia's early measurements on identity development within politics did not result in substantive differences between individuals or identity statuses. For many people, developing an identity is easier in aspects of their lives that are meaningful to them. Politics is not central to many people's lives, and therefore is not a developed as their occupational or religious identities.

== Recent research ==
While much of the work on identity development is found in the discipline of psychology, since the 2000s work is more interdisciplinary with political psychologists adding to the conversation. Social psychologists have focused on examining people in their social and political settings. An expansion of Marcia's work includes application of identity statuses to explain youth voting behavior.

== Youth voter turnout ==
Young people are more likely to participate in elections if they have a fully developed identity. The process to achieve that identity is not linear and can have several crises, such as disagreeing with parents about politics or an individual's political party not representing what the person believes. When young people have a political identity, they are more likely to vote. However, when young people do not have a fully developed identity, they tend to not vote.

=== Five stages of development ===
As a person develops their identity, they go through a process. The same is true with political identity development. Researchers identify five stages including: Socialization, Exploration, Judgment of Others' politics, Self Questioning, and Coherence with the political environment. Socialization is the process by which an individual learns the norms, beliefs, and attitudes about engaging politically. Exploration is the stage where an individual tries out different identities to see which ones fit. The third stage judging others' politics and accepting others' political identity as their own or doubting others politics and developing one's own politics. Next is self questioning where a person questions their beliefs, attitudes and perspectives on politics. The last stage is how an individual fits into their political environment.

=== Four identity statuses applied to youth politics ===
Gentry adapted Marcia's statuses to apply to youth political identity development in modern times. The lowest level of development is Diffusion, where young people avoid engaging in politics and their communities. The next level is Explorer, where youth are looking at different identities and trying out different identities as their own. If a young person does not explore, but has decided upon an identity, these can be Somewhat Developed Identities. Somewhat developed means that the young person has an identity, but it is not necessarily their own; they may have adopted their parent's identity or another role model. The final stage of development is Fully Developed status. For this stage, young people can choose how they fit into their environment. Either young people choose an identity that fits within the environment or they reject the identity options available in the environment. For those who accept the environment, they typically identify with a political party in the environment. For those who reject, they are more likely to be independents.

== Possibilities for future work ==
Future work in the area of political identity development can include comparison of environmental factors, identifying as a political independent or how role models impact identity development.
