= Team-based learning =

Learning and teaching strategy

Team-based learning (TBL) is a collaborative learning and teaching strategy that enables people to follow a structured process to enhance student engagement and the quality of student or trainee learning. The term and concept was first popularized by Larry Michaelsen, the central figure in the development of the TBL method while at University of Oklahoma in the 1970s, as an educational strategy that he developed for use in academic settings, as in medical education. Team-based learning methodology can be used in any classroom or training sessions at school or in the workplace.

== How it works ==
Team-based learning consists of modules that can be taught in a three-step cycle: preparation, in-class readiness assurance testing, and application-focused exercise. It consists of five essential components, with an optional last stage called peer evaluation.

=== Individual pre-work ===
Students are expected to peruse a set of preparatory materials, which can take the form of readings, presentation slides, audio lectures or video lectures. They should be set at a suitable level for the students of the course.

=== Individual Readiness Assurance Test (IRAT) ===
In class, students complete an individual quiz called the IRAT, which consists of 5–20 multiple-choice questions based on the pre-work materials.

=== Team Readiness Assurance Test (TRAT) ===
After submitting the IRAT, students form teams and take the same test and submit answers—on a scratch card or using TBL-enabled software—as a team. Both IRAT and TRAT scores count toward the student's final grade.

=== Clarification session ===
After taking both the IRAT and TRAT, students will have the opportunity to raise points of clarification or question the quality of multiple-choice questions in the tests. Instructors can then address the questions and facilitate a discussion regarding the topics and concepts covered.

=== Application exercises ===
Finally, students work in teams to solve application problems that allow them to apply and expand on the knowledge they have just learned and tested. They must arrive at collective response to the application question and display their answer choice in an e-gallery walk in the classroom. Instructors then facilitate a discussion or debate among teams to consider the possible solutions to the application problem.

=== Peer evaluation ===
This last stage is an optional component of the team-based learning process. At the middle or end of the course, some faculty members do a peer evaluation for their teams.

== Principles ==
The implementation of TBL is based on four underlying principles according to Michaelsen & Richards, 2005:

1. Groups should be properly formed and groups should have an evenly distributed number of talented people among them. According to Michaelsen, "most of the reported "problems" with learning groups (free-riders, member conflict, etc.) are the direct result of inappropriate group assignments".
2. Students are accountable for their pre-learning and team work.
3. Team assignments should promote learning and team development.
4. Students must receive frequent and immediate feedback.

== Benefits ==
Team-Based Learning has been suggested to help students who seem uninterested in subject material, do not do their homework, and have difficulty understanding material. TBL can transform traditional content with application and problem solving skills, while developing interpersonal skills. Vaughn et al. (2019) stated that team-based learning is an effective method for gaining better “content acquisition, vocabulary growth, and reading comprehension” (p. 121). Jakobsen and Knetemann (2017) further add that team-based learning allows students to take a much deeper look at course content and serve to hold their attention better than traditional methods. Its implementation in education can also be important for developing skills and abilities that are useful for businesses, organizations, careers, and industries where many projects and tasks are performed by teams. Learning how to learn, work, interact, and collaborate in a team is essential for success in this kind of an environment. Many of the medical schools have adopted some version of TBL for several of the benefits listed above, and also for greater long-term knowledge retention. According to a study done by the Washington University School of Medicine, individuals who learned through an active team based learning curriculum had greater long-term knowledge retention compared to a traditional passive lecture curriculum. Evidently, faculty of professional schools are thus directing their focus towards developing application and integration of knowledge beyond the content-based curricula, rather than simple course objectives such as simply memorizing a concept. Michaelsen adds that "assignments that require groups to make decisions and enable them to report their decisions in a simple form, will usually generate high levels of group interaction" and are:

- significant (correlated to important course objectives, meaningful to the future work that the course might prepare a student for),
- the same for all teams in the course,
- about making a decision – providing a simple answer – based on complex analysis of data or application of course principles, and
- simultaneously reported to the whole class and evaluated then and there by the instructor.

Controlled studies of initial implementations of team learning have shown increases in student engagement and mixed results for other outcomes.

The World Economic Forum identified Top 10 skills required in its "The Future of Jobs and Skills" report, namely complex problem solving, critical thinking, creativity, people management, coordinating with others, emotional intelligence, judgement and decision making, service orientation, and negotiation, and cognitive flexibility. TBL is often compared to the traditional one-way lecture format that does not develop those skills in students. On the other hand, TBL can engage students and provide an environment of collaborative learning and discussion. More than 500 publications in the Education Resource Information Center (ERIC) provide evidence for the positive educational outcomes of TBL-use in the classroom.

TBL is resource efficient. In digitally-enabled classroom settings, the use of TBL cuts the amount of paper used for the lesson. Instructors also do not need to prepare the materials in hardcopy and can easily make changes to the questions to be discussed in class, remotely or on the go. Since most of the learning happens in the form of discussions and feedback sessions in class, unnecessary paperwork is left out of the equation altogether. In addition, instructors can gather data on the performance of a class and automate student grading.

== Prevalence ==
=== Academic ===
Team-Based Learning has been gaining traction in academic institutions, especially in the field of medicine in the US. Out of all 144 medical schools there, at least 83% use TBL pedagogy. 44 of those institutions also have faculty or staff who are part of the Team-Based Learning Collaborative (TBLC), an international collaborative that focuses on connecting TBL practitioners, sharing TBL resources, and promoting best practices. Within the top 50 medical schools in the US, 92% use TBL pedagogy.

=== Training / coaching ===
Given its effectiveness in most teaching scenarios, team-based learning can also be used in institution-wide training programmes.

== History ==
Team-based learning has in recent years been advanced by Duke Corporate Education and PricewaterhouseCoopers. In 2005, Judy Rosenblum, then President of Duke Corporate Education, and Tom Evans, Chief Learning Officer of PricewaterhouseCoopers, began to explore the learning environment in teaching hospitals and its possible transferability to corporate environments.
