= Group Facilitation: A Research and Applications Journal =

Group Facilitation
- Discipline: Management, business
- Language: English
- Edited by: Stephen Thorpe

Publication details
- History: 1999-present
- Publisher: International Association of Facilitators
- Frequency: Annual

Standard abbreviations
- ISO 4: Group Facil.

Indexing
- ISSN: 1534-5653 (print); 1545-5947 (web)
- LCCN: 2001213705
- OCLC no.: 476092163

Links
- Journal homepage

Group Facilitation: A Research and Applications Journal is a peer-reviewed academic journal covering all aspects of group facilitation and the repercussions for the individuals, groups, organizations, and communities involved. It is published by the International Association of Facilitators and the current editor-in-chief is Stephen Thorpe.

== Overview ==
The journal has the following sections: Application and Practice, containing articles that reflect on the facilitator experience; Theory and Research, containing articles that explore, propose, or test practices, principles, or other aspects of facilitation models; Edge Thinking, containing commentaries on new concepts and issues; and Book Reviews.

== History ==
The journal originally started production during 1996 when the IAF website was first launched. The first issue of the journal was officially published during the fall of 1999. Since this date, eleven issues have been published.

== Abstracting and indexing ==
The journal is abstracted and indexed in Business Source, ABI/INFORM, and ProQuest Central.
