= SCALE-UP =

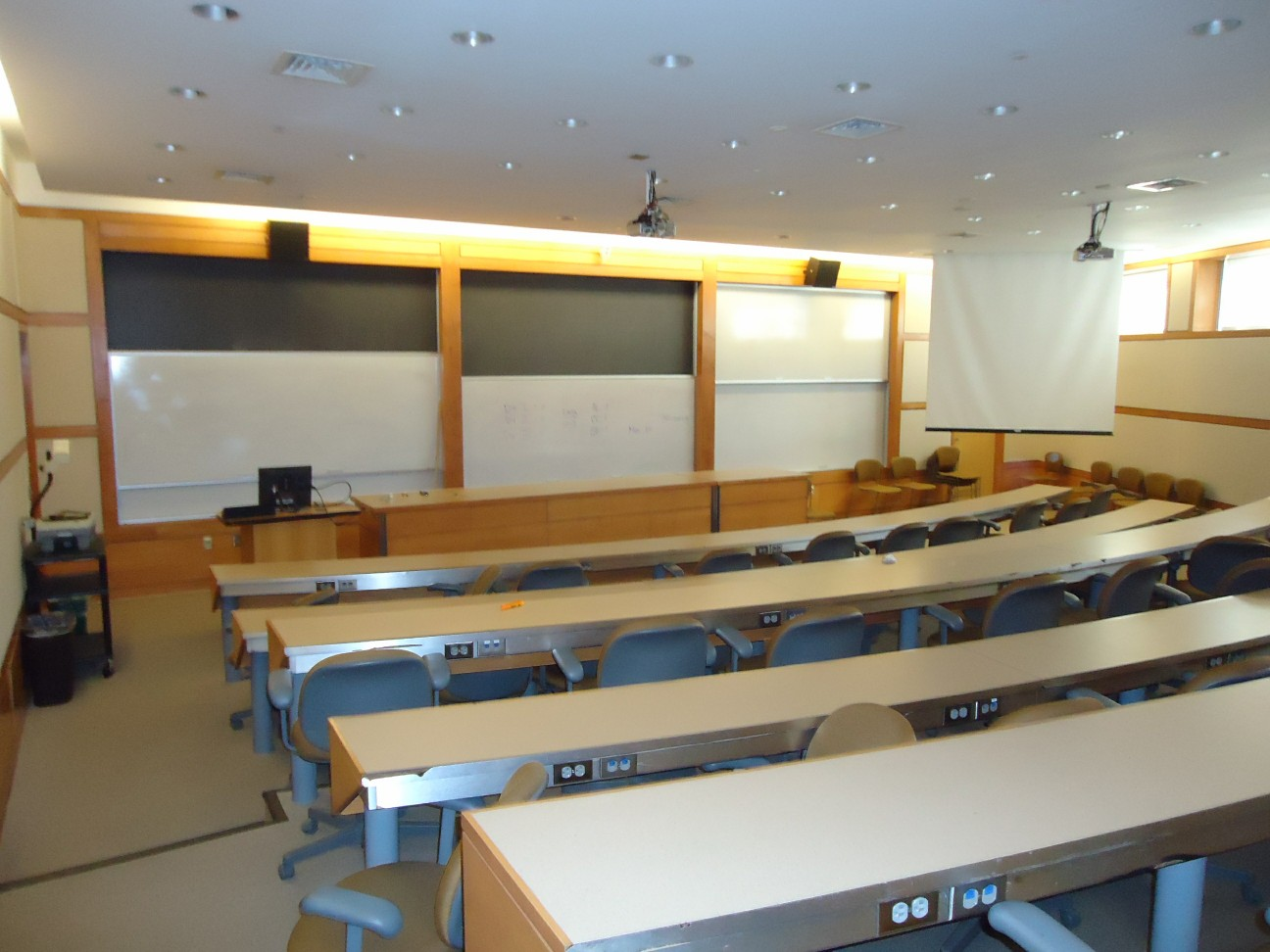
Typical large enrollment classroom in a college

SCALE-UP, Student-Centered Active Learning Environment with Upside-Down Pedagogies, is a classroom specifically created to facilitate active, collaborative learning in a classroom. The spaces are carefully designed to facilitate interactions between teams of students who work on short, interesting tasks revolving around specific content. Some people think the rooms look more like restaurants than classrooms.

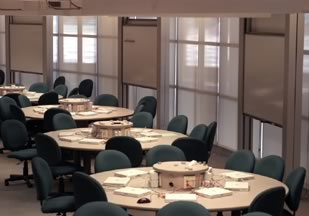
A 99-seat room at NCSU

== History ==
Originally developed in 1997 by Robert Beichner at North Carolina State University to help with large enrollment physics courses. At this time, SCALE-UP stood for 'Student-Centered Activities for Large Enrollment Undergraduate Physics.' Although originated at North Carolina State University, more than five hundred colleges across the US and around the world are known to have directly adopted the SCALE-UP model and adapted it to their particular needs. When SCALE-UP was incorporated in different disciplines then the name was changed to 'Student-Centered Active Learning Environment for Undergraduate Programs.' Now, because of the increasing number of pre-college installations, plus to draw attention to the instruction pedagogy as well as the space, the name has become "Student-Centered Active Learning Environment with Upside-down Pedagogies."

The basic idea is that students are given something interesting to investigate. While they work in teams on these "tangibles" (hands-on measurements or observations) and "ponderables" (interesting, complex problems), the instructor is free to roam around the classroom–--asking questions, sending one team to help another, or asking why someone else got a different answer. There is no separate lab class and most of the "lectures" are actually class-wide discussions. The groups are carefully structured and give students many opportunities to interact. Three teams (labelled a, b, and c) sit at each round table and have white boards nearby. Each team has a laptop in case they need web access. The original design called for 11 round tables of nine students, but many schools have smaller classes while a few have even larger ones.

== Components ==
Tables that encourage group collaboration and interactions

Tables can have multiple shapes. The original SCALE-UP tables called for a decagon shaped table where students sat on one side of the table in "pods." There are modifications to the original tables which were D-shaped tables that sit six students (2 on each side) all facing the front of the classroom or the main projector. There is another option in which the tables are round and students can sit in groups of 3 (3 groups at the table).

Technology

Technology includes: video screens, computers for the students, instructor station, document camera, projectors. In a high-tech classroom there are individual computers that can be plugged into mounted monitors that can show the table or the whole class. In a low tech classroom there is only a main projector at the front of the classroom.

Student Whiteboards

There are whiteboards given to each table. These whiteboards can be mounted on a wall or a board that can be placed on the table in the middle.

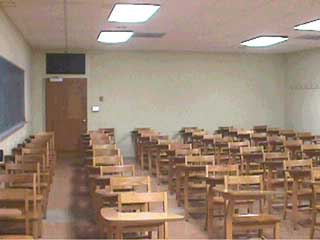
NCSU Pilot Room before modifications, seating 55 students

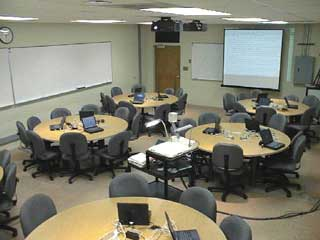
NCSU Pilot room after modifications, seating 54 students]

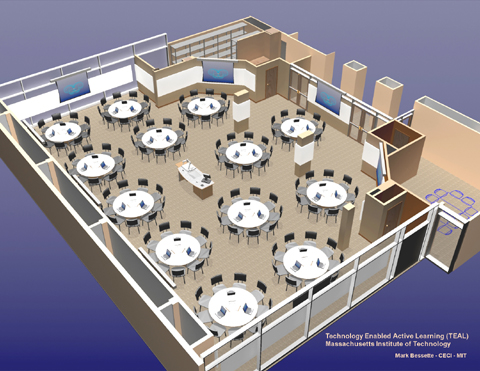
MIT The d'Arbeloff Studio Classroom, seating 117 students
