= Small Group Research =

- Discipline: Social psychology
- Language: English
- Edited by: Aaron M. Brower, Joann Keyton

Publication details
- History: 1970-present
- Publisher: SAGE Publications
- Frequency: Bimonthly
- Impact factor: 1.163 (2017)

Standard abbreviations
- ISO 4: Small Group Res.

Indexing
- ISSN: 1046-4964 (print); 1552-8278 (web)
- LCCN: 90643145
- OCLC no.: 41205740

Links
- Journal homepage; Online access; Online archive

Small Group Research is a peer-reviewed academic journal that covers research in the field of social psychology, dealing with the psychology and organizational behavior of small groups and communication processes within them. The editors-in-chief are Dennis Kivlighan (University of Maryland) and Lyn Van Swol (University of Wisconsin-Madison). It was established in 1970 and is currently published by SAGE Publications.

== Abstracting and indexing ==
Small Group Research is abstracted and indexed in Scopus and the Social Sciences Citation Index. According to the Journal Citation Reports, its 2017 impact factor is 1.163, ranking it 51st out of 64 journals in the category "Psychology, Social", 161th out of 209 journals in the category "Management", and 59th out of 82 journals in the category "Psychology, Applied".
