= Norman Triplett =

American psychologist (1861–1934)

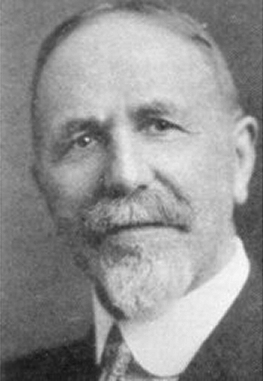
Norman Triplett

Norman Triplett (October 1, 1861 – 1934) was a psychologist at Indiana University. He is best known for conducting one of the earliest experiments in social psychology, on the phenomenon of social facilitation.

== Biography ==
Triplett was born on a farm near Perry, Illinois in 1861. In 1898, he conducted what Gordon Allport called the first experiment in social psychology, though this claim has been challenged in recent years. His experiment was on the social facilitation effect. Triplett noticed that cyclists tend to have faster times when riding in the presence of a counterpart as opposed to riding alone. He then demonstrated this effect in a controlled, laboratory experiment and concluded that children perform a simple lab task faster in pairs than when performing by themselves.

In addition to his pioneering work in social and sport psychology, Triplett was also interested in the psychology of magic. He developed an extensive list of conjuring tricks and detailed some of the principles involved, such as concealment and suggestion.

Triplett was Granville Stanley Hall's second doctoral student. He retired from active service in 1931. In 1934, Triplett died in a hospital in Manhattan, Kansas. Norman Triplett and his wife Laura were buried in Maplewood memorial cemetery in Emporia, Kansas.

== Social facilitation experiment ==
In his experiment, Triplett arranged for 40 children to play a game that involved turning a small fishing reel as quickly as possible. He found that those who played the game in pairs turned the reel faster than those who were alone. Triplett's design involved the creation of two groups (A and B) with the sequence of trials differing for each.

Group A
1. alone
2. competition
3. alone
4. competition
5. alone
6. competition

Group B
1. alone
2. alone
3. competition
4. alone
5. competition
6. alone

The rationale for this design was to eliminate practice and fatigue effects. He concluded that moving from isolation to a group context can reduce our sense of uniqueness, but at the same time it can enhance our ability to perform simple tasks rapidly.

Triplett discussed several possible explanations for his findings and concluded that the "bodily presence of another contestant participating simultaneously in the race serves to liberate latent energy not ordinarily available" (Triplett, 1898). Social facilitation has received much attention from social psychologists since Triplett's time, with a number of causal factors implicated, including mere presence, evaluation apprehension, competition, attention, and distraction. Although the phenomenon of social facilitation is now well established, Triplett's original experiment did not produce strong results, at least by modern standards in psychology.

== Reanalysis ==
Triplett did not have the advantage of sophisticated statistical procedures available today and for his study he simply eyeballed the data. He decided that some children performed better when competing, some performed worse, and others were not affected. The fact that half of his participants showed no evidence of social facilitation would suggest that one should avoid overstating these findings. In 2005 Michael Strube reanalyzed the data from the original 1898 study. First he conducted a between-group analysis and found no evidence of significance. The results show that in 4 of 5 of the between group comparisons, the performance of participants in the presence of a co-acting peer was faster than the performances of the participants winding the fishing reel alone. The differences however are quite small and none of them are close to statistically significant. He also conducted two within subjects comparisons. A trial main effect was found that showed better performance on later trials, however the Trial X Order interaction was not significant. The analyses of Triplett's data indicated little effect of social facilitation.
