= Team =

Group linked in a common purpose

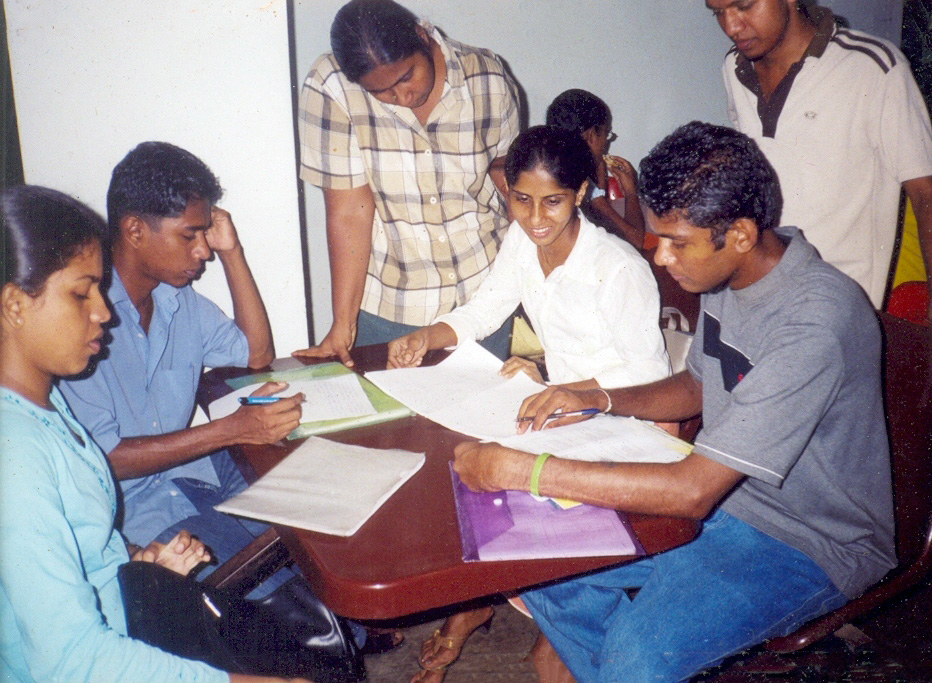
A team at work

A team is a group of individuals (human or non-human) working together to achieve their goal.

As defined by Professor Leigh Thompson of the Kellogg School of Management, "[a] team is a group of people who are interdependent with respect to information, resources, knowledge and skills and who seek to combine their efforts to achieve a common goal".

A group does not necessarily constitute a team. Teams normally have members with complementary skills and generate synergy through coordinated efforts that allow each member to maximize their strengths and minimize their weaknesses. According to Naresh Jain (2009):

Team members need to learn how to help one another, help other team members realize their true potential, and create an environment that allows everyone to go beyond their limitations.

While academic research on teams and teamwork has grown consistently and has shown a sharp increase over the past recent 40 years, the societal diffusion of teams and teamwork actually followed a volatile trend in the 20th century. The concept was introduced into business in the late 20th century, which was followed by a popularization of the concept of constructing teams. Differing opinions exist on the efficacy of this new management fad. Some see "team" as a four-letter word: overused and under-useful.

Others see it as a panacea that realizes the Human Relations Movement's desire to integrate what that movement perceives as best for workers and as best for managers.

Many people believe in the effectiveness of teams, but also see them as dangerous because of the potential for exploiting workers — in that team effectiveness can rely on peer pressure and peer surveillance. However, Hackman sees team effectiveness not only in terms of performance: a truly effective team will contribute to the personal well-being and adaptive growth of its members.

English-speakers commonly use the word "team" in today's society to characterise many types of groups. Peter Guy Northouse's book Leadership: theory and practice discusses teams from a leadership perspective. According to the team approach to leadership, a team is a type of organizational group of people that are members. A team is composed of members who are dependent on each other, work towards interchangeable achievements, and share common attainments. A team works as a whole together to achieve certain things. A team is usually located in the same setting as it is normally connected to a kind of organization, company, or community. Teams can meet in-person (directly face-to-face) or virtually when practicing their values and activities or duties. A team's communication is significantly important to their relationship. Ergo, communication is frequent and persistent, and as well are the meetings. The definition of team as an organizational group is not completely set in stone, as organizations have confronted a myriad of new forms of contemporary collaboration. Teams usually have strong organizational structured platforms and respond quickly and efficiently to challenges as they have skills and the capability to do so. An effective organizational team leads to greater productivity, more effective implementation of resources, better decisions and problem-solving, better-quality products/service, and greater innovation and originality.

Alongside the concept of a team, compare the more structured/skilled concept of a crew, the advantages of formal and informal partnerships, or the well-defined – but time-limited – existence of task forces.

A team becomes more than just a collection of people when a strong sense of mutual commitment creates synergy, thus generating performance greater than the sum of the performance of its individual members.

Thus teams of game players can form (and re-form) to practise their craft/sport. Transport logistics executives can select teams of horses, dogs, or oxen for the purpose of conveying passengers or goods.

== Types ==
Of particular importance is the concept of different types of teams.

=== Categories by subject ===
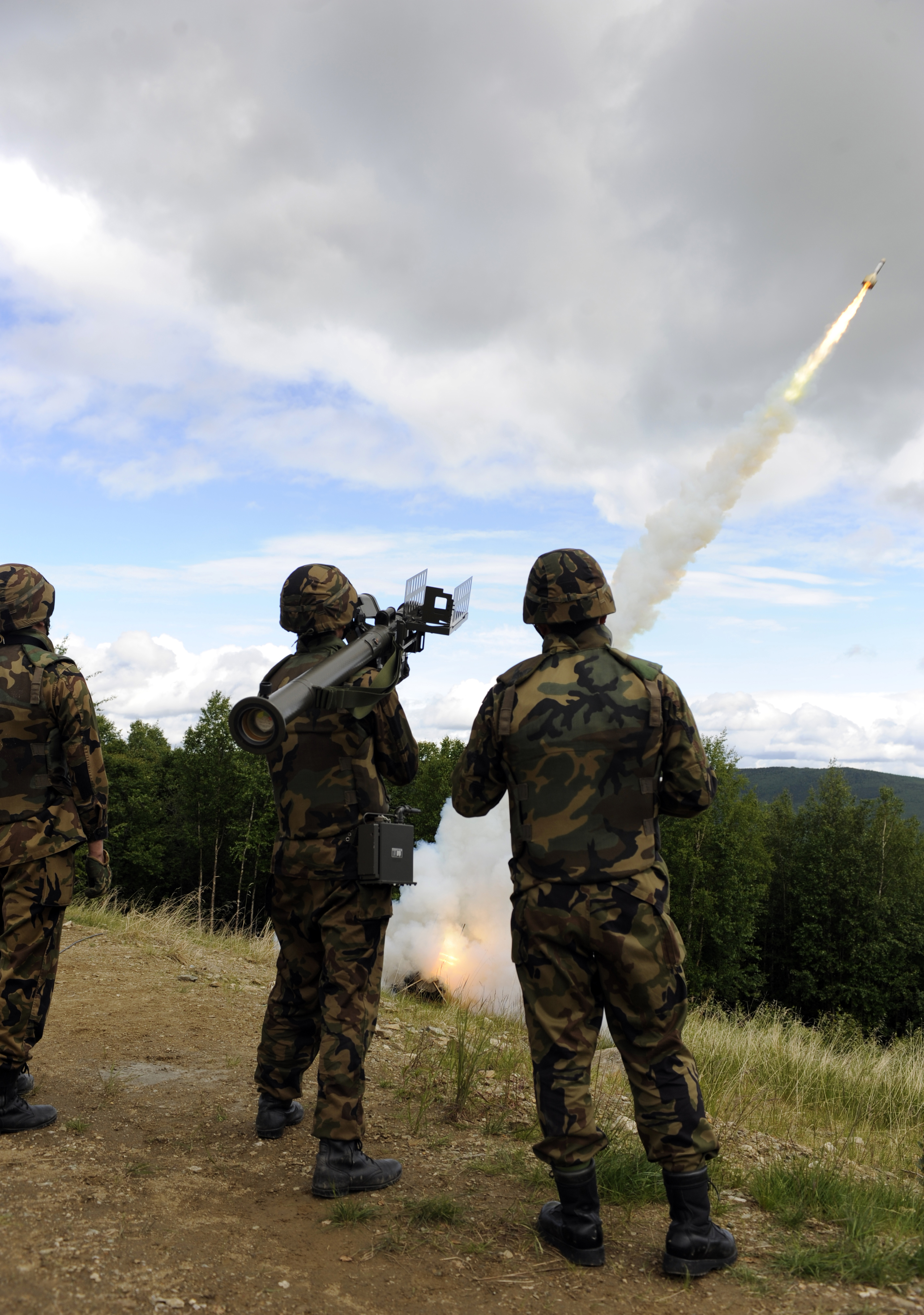
A Japan Air Self-Defense Force (JASDF) team looks on after the Type 91 Kai MANPAD fires a rocket at a mock airborne target.

Although the concept of a team is relatively simple, social scientists have identified many different types of teams. In general, teams either act as information processors, or take on a more active role in the task and actually perform activities. Common categories and subtypes of teams include:

==== Action teams ====
An action team is a group of people with leadership skills. It devises strategies, analyze situations and execute needed actions.

==== Advisory teams ====
Advisory teams make suggestions about a final product. For instance, a quality-control group on an assembly line would be an example of an advisory team: they may examine the products produced and make suggestions about how to improve the quality of the items being made. A product reaches the final stage and is put for sales after getting approved by the advisory teams. The advisory team consists of experts who possess extraordinary skills.

==== Command team ====
The goal of the command team is to combine instructions and to coordinate action among management. In other words, command teams serve as the "middle man" in tasks. For instance, messengers on a construction site, conveying instructions from the executive team to the builders, would be an example of a command team.

==== Executive team ====
An executive team is a management team that draws up plans for activities and then directs these activities. An example of an executive team would be a construction team designing blueprints for a new building, and then guiding the construction of the building using these blueprints.

==== Project teams ====
A team used only for a defined period of time and for a separate, concretely definable purpose, often becomes known as a project team. This category of team includes negotiation-, commission- and design-team subtypes. In general, these types of teams are multi-talented and composed of individuals with expertise in many different areas. Members of these teams might belong to different groups, but receive assignment to activities for the same project, thereby allowing outsiders to view them as a single unit. In this way, setting up a team allegedly facilitates the creation, tracking and assignment of a group of people based on the project in hand. The use of the "team" label in this instance often has no relationship to whether the employees work as a team.

Lundin and Soderholm define project teams as a special case in the more general category of temporary organizations which also includes task forces, program committees, and action groups. All of these are formed to "make things happen". This emphasis on action leads to a demarcation between the temporary organization and its environment. The demarcation is driven by four interrelated concepts (the four T's):

1. Time – the time horizons and limits are crucial to the existence of temporary organizations "whose very existence helps spread a sense of urgency".
2. Task – the raison d` ètre for the temporary organization; no other party is attending to the same task at the same time in the same way
3. Team – provides the human resources to accomplish the task in the time available
4. Transition – an accomplishment or some sort of qualitative difference is expected after the time horizon

"The concepts also differ from the crucial concepts that define the permanent organization. Permanent organizations are more naturally defined by goals (rather than tasks), survival (rather than time), working organization (rather than team) and production processes and continual development (rather than transition)"

==== Sports teams ====
A sports team is a group of people which play sports (often team sports) together. Members include all players (even those who are waiting their turn to play), as well as support members such as a team manager or coach.

==== Virtual teams ====
Developments in information and communications technology have seen the emergence of the virtual work-team. A virtual team is a group of people who work interdependently and with shared purpose across space, time, and organisational boundaries using technology to communicate and collaborate. Virtual team members can be located across a country or across the world, rarely meet face-to-face, and include members from different cultures.

In their 2009 literature-review paper, Ale Ebrahim, N., Ahmed, S. and Taha, Z. added two key issues to definition of a virtual team: "as small temporary groups of geographically, organizationally and/ or time dispersed knowledge workers who coordinate their work predominantly with electronic information and communication technologies in order to accomplish one or more organization tasks". Many virtual teams are solving customer problems or generating new work processes.

==== Work teams ====
Work teams are responsible for the actual act of creating tangible products and services. The actual workers on an assembly line would be an example of a production team, whereas waiters and waitresses at a diner would be an example of a service team.

=== Interdependent and independent ===
One common distinction is drawn between interdependent and independent teams. The difference is determined by the actions that the team members take while working.

==== Interdependent teams ====
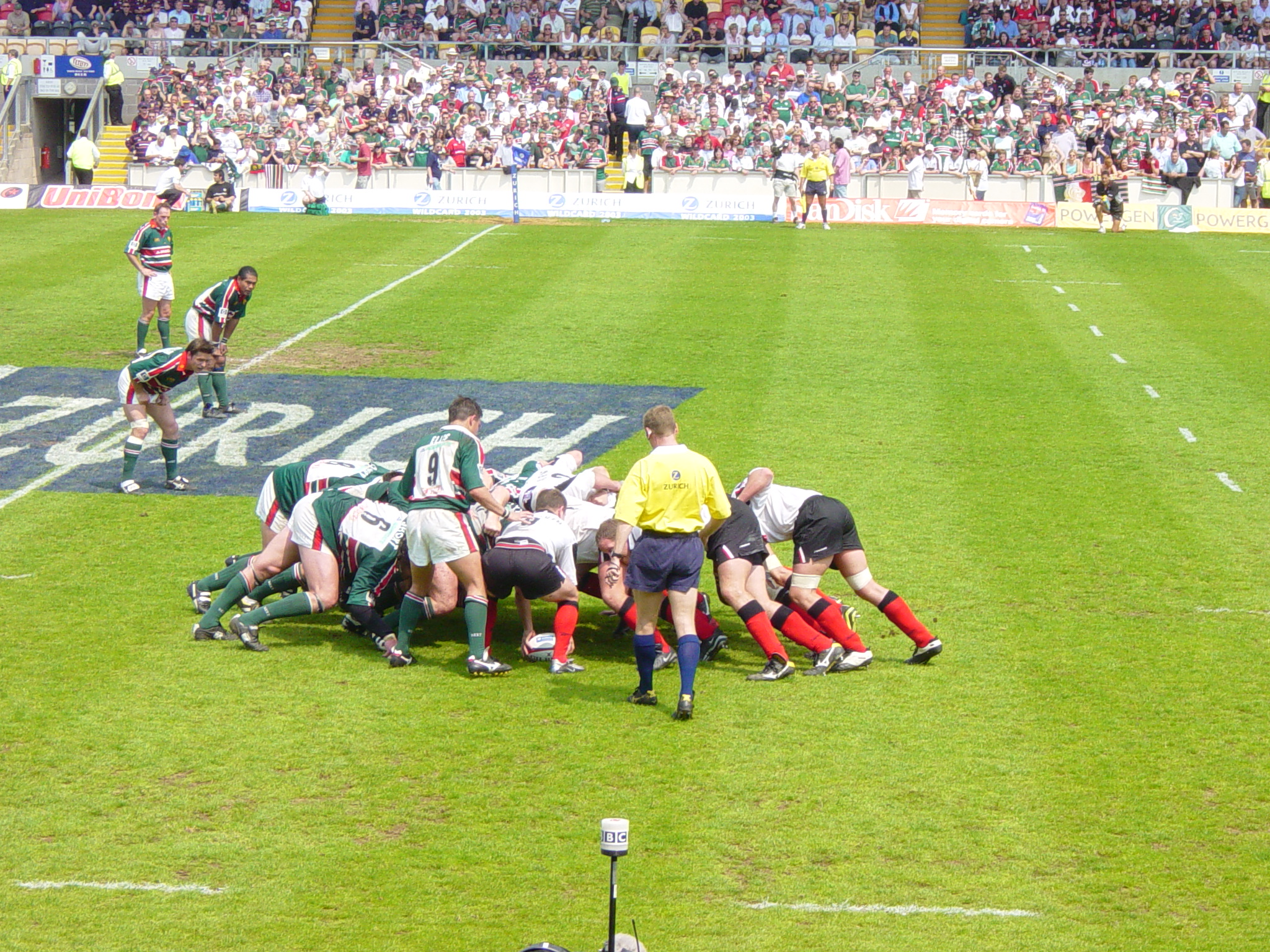
A rugby union scrum

A rugby team provides a clear example of an interdependent team:

- no significant task can be accomplished without the help and cooperation of every member;
- within their team members typically specialize in different tasks (r.r the ball, goal kicking and scrum feeding), and
- the success of every individual is inextricably bound to the success of the whole team. No rugby player, no matter how talented, has ever won a game by playing alone.

==== Independent teams ====
On the other hand, a track-and-field team is a classic example of an independent team:

- races are run, or points are scored, by individuals or by partners
- every person in a given job performs basically the same actions
- how one player performs has no direct effect on the performance of the next player

If all team members each perform the same basic tasks, such as students working problems in a maths class, or outside sales employees making phone calls, then it is likely that this team is an independent team. They may be able to help each other—perhaps by offering advice or practice time, by providing moral support, or by helping in the background during a busy time—but each individual's success is primarily due to each individual's own efforts. Runners do not win their own races merely because the rest of their teammates did, and maths students do not pass tests merely because their neighbours know how to solve equations.

In the business environment, sales teams and traditional professionals (such as doctors, lawyers, and teachers), work in independent teams. Most teams in a business setting are independent teams.

==== Coaching differences between interdependent and independent teams ====
Coaching an interdependent team like a football team necessarily requires a different approach from coaching an independent team like a gymnastics team, because the costs and benefits to individual team members—and therefore the intrinsic incentives for positive team behaviors—differ markedly. An interdependent team benefits from members getting to know the other team members socially, from developing trust in each other, and from conquering artificial collective challenges (such as those offered in outdoors ropes courses). Interdependent teams respond well to collective rewards, and independent teams perform better with individual rewards.

Hybrid teams and hybrid rewards, which try to combine characteristics of both, are sometimes created in the hope of getting the best of both types. However, instead, they tend instead to produce the negative features of each and none of the benefits, and consequently under-perform.

Pressuring teams to become independent or interdependent, on the grounds that management has decided that one type is intrinsically better than the other, results in failure. The nature of the team is defined by the type of work that is done, and not by management's wishes or by the fashions of the latest management fad.

=== Multidisciplinary and interdisciplinary ===
Teams in areas of work or study such as in the medical field, may be multidisciplinary or interdisciplinary.

Multidisciplinary teams involve several professionals who independently treat various issues a patient may have, focusing on the issues in which they specialise. The problems that are being treated may or may not relate to other issues being addressed by individual team members.

The interdisciplinary team approach involves all members of the team working together towards the same goal. In an interdisciplinary team approach, members of the core team will often rôle-blend, taking on tasks usually filled by people in different roles on the team.

=== Self-directing or self-designing teams ===
These types of teams result in the highest potential for innovative work and motivation among its members. Team members determine the team's objectives and the means to achieve them. The management's only responsibility among self-directing teams is the creating the team's organizational context. Self-directed teams offer the most potential for innovation, enhance goal commitment and motivation, and provide opportunity for organizational learning and change.

== Team size, composition, and formation ==
Team size and team composition affect team processes and team outcomes. The optimal size (and composition) of teams is debated and will vary depending on the task at hand. At least one study of problem-solving in groups showed an optimal size of groups at four members. Other works estimate the optimal size between 5–12 members or a number of members that can consume two pizzas. The following extract is taken from Chong (2007):

The interest in teams gained momentum in the 1980s with the publication of Belbin's (1981) work on successful teams. The research into teams and teamwork followed two lines of inquiry. Writers such as Belbin (1981, 1993), Woodcock (1989), Margerison and McCann (1990), Davis et al. (1992), Parker (1990), and Spencer and Pruss (1992) focused on team roles and how these affected team performance. These studies suggested that team performance was a function of the number and type of roles team members played. The number of roles for optimal performance varied from 15 (Davis et al., 1992) to four (Parker, 1990). This variation has been attributed to how roles were defined. Lindgren (1997) believed that, in a social psychological sense, 'roles' were behaviours one exhibited within the constraints assigned by the outside world to one's occupational position e.g. leader, manager, supervisor, worker etc. Personality traits, on the other hand, were internally driven and relatively stable over time and across situations. These traits affected behavioural patterns in predictable ways (Pervin, 1989) and, in varying degrees, become part of the 'role' definition as well.
The other line of inquiry focused on measuring the 'effectiveness' of teams. Writers such as Deihl and Stroebe (1987), Gersik (1988), Evenden and Anderson (1992), Furnham et al. (1993), Cohen and Ledford (1994) and Katzenbach (1998) were concerned with high performing teams and the objective measurement of their effectiveness. McFadzean (2002) believed that the appearance of a number of models of team effectiveness was indicative of a variety of variables such as personality, group size, work norms, status relationships, group structure etc. that can impact on team 'effectiveness' and its measurement.

David Cooperrider suggests that the larger the group, the better. This is because a larger group is able to address concerns of the whole system. So while a large team may be ineffective at performing a given task, Cooperider says that the relevance of that task should be considered, because determining whether the team is effective first requires identifying what needs to be accomplished.

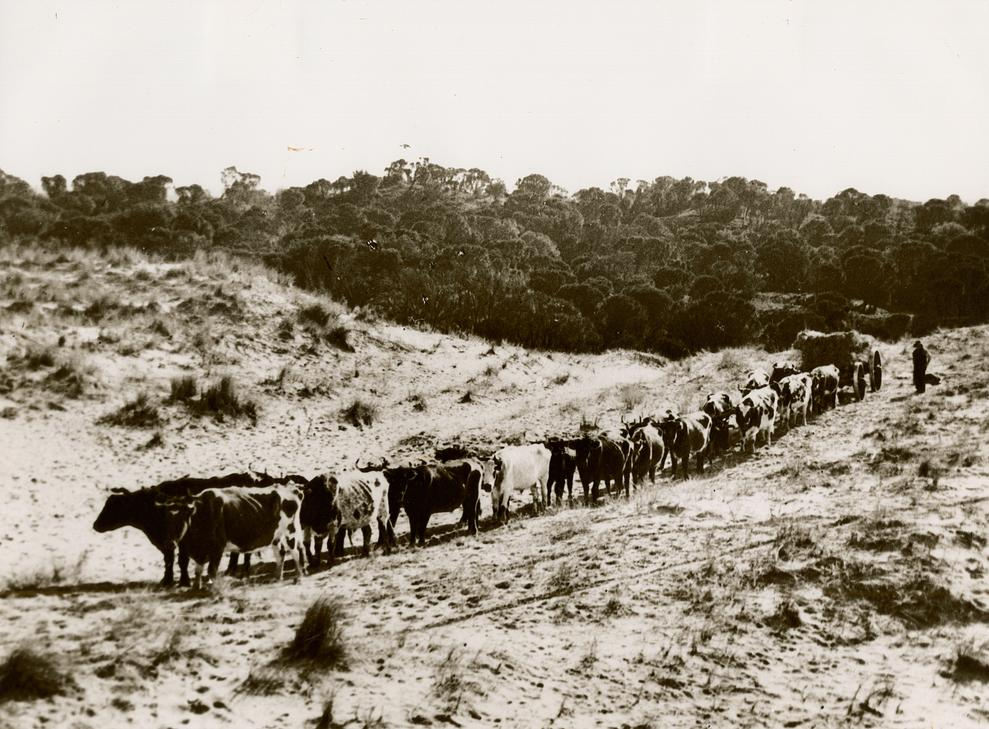
A team of oxen yoked together

Regarding composition, all teams will have an element of homogeneity and heterogeneity. The more homogeneous the group, the more cohesive it will be. The more heterogeneous the group, the greater the differences in perspective and increased potential for creativity, but also the greater potential for conflict.

Team members normally have different roles, like team leader and agents. Large teams can divide into subteams according to need.

Many teams go through a life-cycle of stages, identified by Bruce Tuckman as: forming, storming, norming, performing and adjourning.

== Team cognition ==
Team cognition has been defined as an "emergent state that refers to the manner in which knowledge important to team functioning is organized, represented, and distributed within team." This emergent state can manifest in two ways. Compositional emergence occurs when individual level cognition is similar in form and function to its manifestation at team-level. Compilational emergence, on the other hand, represents a greater degree of synergy among team members and represents a new-team level construct. As such, higher degrees of compilational emergence are more closely related to team process and performance than is compositional emergence.

Research into team cognition has focused on how teams develop mental models and transactive memory systems. Mental models refer to the degree in which team members have similar cognitive understanding of the situation and performance goals which include shared representations of the task. Transactive memory systems relate to how knowledge is distributed among team members and retrieved in a coordinated fashion, the way that team member rely on knowledge that is possessed by other members and how knowledge sets are differentiated within a team. The emergence of team cognition is thought to impact team effectiveness because it can positively affect a team's behavioural process, motivational states, and performance.

Team cognition consists of two broad types of content. Task related models are related to knowledge of the major duties and resources possessed by the team. Team-related models refer to interactions and interdependence among the team members.

== Team effectiveness ==
When companies are in trouble, they often restructure into teams. However, putting people into teams does not solve problems; if not done thoughtfully, this may even cause more problems. The formation of teams is most appropriate for tasks that are difficult, complex and important. These types of tasks are often beyond the skills and abilities of any single individual. However, the formation of a team to complete such tasks does not guarantee success. Rather, the proper implementation of teams is positively related to both member satisfaction and increased effectiveness. Organizations who want to receive the benefits afforded by teams need to carefully consider how teams are built and implemented. Often, teams are created without providing members any training to develop the skills necessary to perform well in a team setting. This is critical, because teamwork can be cognitively and interpersonally demanding. Even when a team consists of talented individuals, these individuals must learn to coordinate their actions and develop functional interpersonal interactions. In their review of the relevant scientific literature, Kozlowski and Ilgen demonstrated that such training can greatly benefit team effectiveness. Finally, teams are more likely to be successful when they are fully supported by the organization. Take for example New United Motor Manufacturing Inc (NUMMI). Originally it was a General Motors automotive manufacturing plant that had to close due to numerous issues, causing it to be the worst performing GM plant. NUMMI was the collaborative creation of General Motors and Toyota. These two companies took most of the same work force and created one of the most productive automotive plants, producing high quality cars. They did this by implementing a new team structure, where management and the company was more supportive of the union workforce.

== Not all groups are teams ==
Some people use the word "team" when they mean "employees". A "sales team" is a common example of this loose or perhaps euphemistic usage, though inter-dependencies exist in organisations, and a sales group can be let down by poor performance in other parts of the organisation upon which sales depend, like delivery, after-sales service, etc. However "sales staff" is a more accurate description of the typical arrangement.

Groups develop into teams in four stages:

1. dependency and inclusion
2. counter dependency and fighting
3. trust and structure
4. work

In the first stage, group development is characterized by members' dependency on the designated leader (identical to 'Forming' in Tuckman's model). In the second stage, the group seeks to free itself from its dependence on the leader and groups have conflicts about goals and procedures (identical to 'Storming' in Tuckman's model). In the third stage, the group manages to work through the conflicts (identical to 'Norming' in Tuckman's model). And in the last stage, groups focus on team productivity (identical to 'Performing' in Tuckman's model).

One aspect of teams that can set them apart from other groups is their level of autonomy. Hackman developed a hierarchical model of team autonomy which consists of four levels of team self-management. It is imagined along a continuum, starting with a manager-led team in which team members complete the required tasks but someone outside the team performs the executive functions. As the person's job it is who performs the executive functions is to define the goals and methods for the team, the team itself holds the sole responsibility of the execution of the work that needs to be performed. Next in the hierarchy are self-managing teams, followed by self-designing teams. Finally, at the top of the hierarchy, come self-governing teams. The model describes four different types of control that fully self-governing teams can possess. These include control over the execution of the task, monitoring and managing work processes, control over the design and performance of a team, and setting the overall direction of the team.

To understand how teams deliver extra performance, we need to distinguish between teams and working groups. A working group's performance is made up of the individual results of all its individual members. A team's performance is made up of both individual results and collective results. Teams produce work products/results though the joint contributions of team members. This is what makes the team's collective performance greater than the sum of all individual members' best performance. In short, a team is more than the sum of its parts.

== Leadership ==
The "team" portion of team leadership is based on individuals and how each share the work between one another. First, individuals must see that they are a team, not simply a group. Each member takes on a portion of the group's leadership and responsibility. Each member helps other members to see their strengths and how they complement each other.

Second, the team sets result driven goals. To achieve this, the designated leader guides the team based decision making process. The team clarifies or agrees on attainable goals. Additionally, they agree on steps to obtain them. Furthermore, the team determines if they need to take an immediate action, or if they can simply watch a situation for a period of time.

Third, if the team decides to take an action, it may be something they change internally, such as clarifying their goals, receiving training, collaborating, or building commitment as a team. If not internally, this action can be something they will act on outside of the team, such as networking with others or negotiating for support.

Lastly, the team's leader will contribute by finding ways to improve team work. This may be done through questionnaires given to the team. These can address any problems, or seek avenues the team would like to see improved. A strength of the team is its continuous stride for improvement and openness to interventional assistance.

In Leadership – Theory and Practice 7th Edition by Peter G. Northouse, he states that, "A team is a type of organizational group that is composed of members who are interdependent, who share common goals, and who must coordinate their activities to accomplish these goals," (Northouse, 363). Overall, the team will lead each other to bring forth their own individual ideas and strengths, which create opportunities for great success.

A common myth is that to function effectively, teams need a strong, powerful, and charismatic leader. In general, leaders who control all the details, manage alle the key relationships in the team, have all the good ideas, and use the team to execute their "vision" are usually overworked and underproductive.

Teams are in need of transformational leaders not more managers, with the important caveat that the world does not function well without managers. Transformational leaders engage in the following behaviors:

- Idealized Influence: The ability to engage other people by your actions. They like the way that you do things, they like the way the you treat people, and they like your approach to problems. Charisma is often associated with idealized influence.
- Inspirational Motivation: The ability to inspire others with your vision. Those who lead with inspirational motivation will enable their followers to achieve things they did not believe were possible.
- Intellectual Stimulation: The ability to stimulate others to be creative and challenge preconceptions they possess. This behavior enables a leader to tap into creativity as a competitive advantage.
- Individualized Consideration: The ability to truly know those that you wish to lead. This behavior enables leaders to realize and draw out the full potential of others.

== See also ==
- Air-defense experiments
- Coalition
- Collective intelligence
- Community
- Driving (horse)
- Forming-storming-norming-performing
- Group (sociology)
- Groups of people
- Judge–advisor system
- Multiteam system
- Player
- Super-team
- Team building
- Team composition
- Team management
- Teamwork
- The Five Dysfunctions of a Team
- The Wisdom of Crowds
