= Team management =

Ability to administer and coordinate a group to perform a task

Team management is the ability of an individual or an organization to administer and coordinate a group of individuals to perform a task. Team management involves teamwork, communication, objective setting, and performance appraisals. Moreover, team management is the capability to identify problems, and resolve conflicts within a team. Teams are a popular approach to many business challenges. They can produce innovative solutions to complex problems. There are various methods and leadership styles a team manager can take to increase personnel productivity and build an effective team. In the workplace teams can come in many shapes and sizes who all work together and depend on one another. They communicate and all strive to accomplish a specific goal. Management teams are a type of team that performs duties such as managing and advising other employees and teams that work with them. Whereas work, parallel, and project teams hold the responsibility of direct accomplishment of a goal, management teams are responsible for providing general direction and assistance to those teams.

== Elements of a healthy and successful team ==
=== Cohesive leadership ===
In any functional team, cohesion amongst team leaders and decision makers is vital. Cohesive leadership means that team leaders act together as a unit and make decisions as a team instead of each branching off into their own work and operating individually. It ensures that the team will be steered in one direction instead of multiple directions due to team leaders not being concise and consistent with their instructions. Cohesive leadership will require team leaders to have strong communication skills. Lastly, motivation fosters a sense of purpose, bringing individuals towards a common goal. When team members are driven by a passion, it creates a cohesive environment. Cohesiveness promotes collaboration support, and synergy which brings motivation and strength that can bond the overall group's cohesiveness.

=== Effective communication ===
Effective communication is the centerstone of successful team management. Ensuring clear goals and expectations opens opportunities that enables a collaborative environment, allowing team members to share ideas and feedback seamlessly. A well communicated team is better prepared to overcome challenges and make informed decisions. There must be an effective channel of communication(or Organizational communication) from the top to the bottom of the chain of command and vice versa. An effective channel of communication will allow messages to be transferred accurately without delay to the intended recipient, which will speed up decision making processes and the operations of the team. Furthermore, effective communication will increase the flexibility of an organization and cause it to be less susceptible to changes in the external environment, as a faster decision making process will allow organizations a longer time period to adapt to the changes and execute contingency plans. The use of social media at work positively influences three team processes, specifically the effective communication, knowledge sharing and coordination.

=== Common goal ===
In a group setting, common goals act as a binding force. Aligning skills and efforts towards a shared objective provides a cohesive setting. Ensuring everyone is working towards a unified purpose creates common goals that enhance group efficiency, foster teamwork, and contribute to a sense of camaraderie, ultimately leading to success. When team members first come together, they will each bring different ideas; however, the key to a successful team is the alignment of its objectives. It is essential that the team leader sets a common goal the entire team is willing to pursue. This way, all of the team members will put in effort in order to attain the goal. If there is not a common goal, team members who disagree with the objective in hand will feel reluctant to utilize their full effort, leading to failure to achieve the goal. In other cases, team members might divert themselves to other tasks due to a lack of belief or interest in the goal.

=== Defined team roles and responsibilities ===
Poorly defined roles are often the biggest obstacle to a successful team. If team members are unclear what their role is, their contributions will be minimal, therefore it is the team leader's duty to outline the roles and responsibilities of each individual within the team and ensure that they work together as an integral unit.

In a successful team, a leader will first evaluate the team's mission to understand what is needed to accomplish the task. Then, they will identify the strengths and weaknesses of the team members and assign roles accordingly. Lastly, they must ensure that all team members know what each other's responsibilities are to avoid confusion and to create an effective channel of communication.

Individuals in a team can take on different roles that have their own unique responsibilities. A task-oriented role occurs when the individual offers new ideas, coordinates activities, or tries to find new information to share with the team. A social-oriented role occurs when an individual encourages the members of the team to be united. They also encourage participation and communication. An individual role occurs when an individual blocks the team's activities. They tend to call attention to themselves and avoid interaction with others. Another occurrence is role conflict, which is a situation where an individual faces divergent role expectation. This means they are being pulled in various directions and hold different roles simultaneously.

== Methods of team management ==
=== Command and Control ===
The "command and control” method as an approach to team management is based on the concept of military management. It was a commonly used system in the private sector during the 21st century. In this method, the team leader instructs their team members to complete a task and if they refuse, they will punish employees until they comply. The team leader has absolute authority and utilises an autocratic leadership style. There are considerable drawbacks to this team management method. First, morale is lowered due to team members being belittled for the slightest mistakes; punishments lead to a lack of confidence resulting in poor performance. Second, in modern organisations roles are often specialised, therefore managers will require the expertise of the employee, elevating the value of the employee. Implementing this team management method leads to a high rate of employee turnover. In addition, in large organisations managers don't have the time to provide instructions to all employees and continuously monitor them; this will impede an organisation's performance as managers are not spending time on their core responsibilities.

=== Engage and Create ===
Due to the limiting nature of the "command and control” method, managers developed an alternative management strategy known as “engage and create”. In this method team members are encouraged to participate in discussions and contribution.This yield better results. Engaged employees are inspiring to be around, excellent at their jobs, and essential to the success. Engagement and creating share similarities as both involve participation and support. When team members are engaged, they are invested in their work and the overall goals of the team. Creating, on the other hand, often involves generating new ideas and solutions. Together, they form a solid combination for team management. Engaged team members are more likely to contribute creatively which can lead to problem solving, productivity, and a positive work environment. Ultimately enhancing overall team performance to reach the team's goals.

=== Econ 101 ===
In the “econ 101” method of team management, the team leader makes the baseline assumption that all team members are motivated by reward in the form of money, and that the best way to manage the team is to provide financial rewards for performance and issue punishments for failure. This method of team management uses material gains in the place of intrinsic motivation to drive team members. This is similar to Frederick Taylor's theory of scientific management which claims the main form of motivation for employees is money. The main drawback of this method is that it does not take into account other forms of motivation besides money such as personal satisfaction and ambition. Moreover, using reward and punishment as a method of team management can cause demotivation as everyone is motivated by different factors and there is no one way to satisfy all team members; the negative effect is further compounded by punishment leading to demoralisation and loss of confidence.

== Problems in team management ==
=== Absence of trust ===
In Patrick Lencioni's book The Five Dysfunctions of a Team, the absence of vulnerability-based trust – where team members are comfortable being vulnerable with each other, trust each other to help when asking for guidance, and are willing to admit their mistakes – within a team is detrimental to a team. Team leaders have to assist each other when they are vulnerable and also allow team members to see their vulnerable side, which is contradictory to the orthodox belief. If a team lacks vulnerability-based trust, team members will not be willing to share ideas or acknowledge their faults due to the fear of being exposed as incompetent, leading to a lack of communication and the hindering of the team. To make vulnerability-based trust part of who you are, practice following these three steps. First, understand your vulnerabilities by looking at your past experiences and how they’ve affected you. Second, take that and create open communication where you and others can share thoughts and feelings. Lastly, view vulnerability as a way to grow stronger. By doing these things, you will build trust within yourself and your colleagues, making it a natural part of your personality and forming meaningful connections throughout your time.

=== Fear of conflict ===
Contrary to general belief, conflict is a positive element in a team as it drives discussion. The fear of conflict is the fear of team members to argue with one another or disagree with the team leader. If team members hold back and are afraid of confronting their leader or teammates, then the concept of a team is non-existent because there is only one person who contributes and no new ideas are generated from discussions.

The fear of conflict in a team stems from an absence of trust, more specifically vulnerability-based trust. If team members are afraid to be vulnerable in front of one another, disputes can be manipulative and a means to overthrow and shame the other team member. However, if team members trust each other and are comfortable being vulnerable in front of one another, then debates can be a pursuit of a better and more effective method to achieve a task.

=== Lack of commitment ===
When team members don't provide input on a decision, it shows that they do not agree or approve of the decision, leading to a halt in team activity and progress. Furthermore, when team members don't express their opinions, views and potential ideas are lost, hurting the project and the team. Effective communication is crucial for the success of any team. Poor communication leads to missed deadlines, conflict, and unhappy individuals. Team members should feel free to bounce ideas off of each other and provide feedback to improve the team.

=== Avoidance of accountability ===
The avoidance of accountability in a team is the failure of team members to be accountable for the consequences of their actions. When team members do not commit to a decision, they will be unwilling to take responsibility for the outcomes of the decision.

In addition, if a lack of trust exists within the team then there will be an absence of peer to peer accountability; team members will not feel accountable towards their team members and hence will not put effort into their tasks. The team must trust and hold each other responsible so that the intention will always be for the benefit of the team and for the team to succeed.

Team leaders who are afraid of confrontation might avoid holding team members accountable when in fact they have made a mistake. Team leaders must develop the confidence to hold team members accountable so that they will feel the sense of responsibility and entitlement to the team, and learn from their mistakes. If not, then errors will not be corrected and might lead to worse problems, causing a defective team.

=== Inattention to results ===
If team leaders and team members do not hold each other accountable then they will not be concerned about the outcome of the team and whether they have achieved their goal, as they do not have a drive to obtain great results. Inattention to results causes a loss of purpose and brings into question the existence of the team.

== Resolving problems through team management ==
=== Building trust ===
An approach to resolving fundamental trust problems within teams is to build trust amongst team members. A team leader can build trust by persuading team members to ask questions and seek guidance from other team members so that they are more familiar and comfortable in being vulnerable with one another. This may include questions such as “Could you teach me how to do this?” or statements like “You are better than me at this”. However, in order to achieve vulnerability-based trust within the team, the team leader must be vulnerable first. If the team leader is unwilling to be vulnerable, the rest of the team will be unwilling to follow.

=== Appraisals ===
Appraisals can be a way for team members to provide feedback to one another or for team members to provide advice to the leader. This allows individual members of the team to reflect on their performance and aim to do better by amending their mistakes; furthermore appraisals create an environment where the chain of command is non-existent and team members can be honest towards one another. This is effective in a way that the team can provide progressive feedback towards other members and can advise the leader on how he or she can improve their leadership. After each member reads their appraisals, they will understand how they can strive to improve, benefitting the team in reaching its objectives. The commonly used forms of appraisals are performance appraisals, peer appraisals and 360 degree feedback.

=== Team building activities ===
Team-building activities are a series of simple exercises involving teamwork and communication. The main objectives of team building activities are to increase trust amongst team members and allow team members to better understand one another. When choosing or designing team-building activities it is best to determine if your team needs an event or an experience. Generally an event is fun, quick and easily done by non-professionals. Team building experiences provide richer, more meaningful results. Experiences should be facilitated by a professional on an annual basis for teams that are growing, or changing.

=== What makes teams effective ===
Team effectiveness occurs when the team has appropriate goals to complete and the confidence to accomplish those goals. Communication is also a large part of effectiveness in a team because in order to accomplish tasks, the members must negotiate ideas and information. Another aspect of effectiveness is reliability and trust. When overcoming the “storming” phase of Bruce Tuckman's stages of group development, trust is established, and it leads to higher levels of team cohesion and effectiveness. If there is a conflict, effectiveness allows cohesion and the ability to overcome conflict. Specifically in management teams, more weight falls on their shoulders because they have to direct and lead other teams. Being effective is a main priority for the team or teams involved. Unlike non-managerial teams, in which the focus is on a set of team tasks, management teams are effective only insofar as they are accomplishing a high level of performance by a significant business unit or an entire firm. Having support from higher-up position leaders can give teams insight on how to act and make decisions, which improves their effectiveness as well.

== See also ==
- Economics
- Leadership
- Leadership style
- Management
- Socionics
- Teamwork
