= Organizational ethics =

Field of ethics focusing on organizations

Organizational ethics is the ethics of an organization, and it is how an organization responds to an internal or external stimulus. Organizational ethics is interdependent with the organizational culture. Although it is to both organizational behavior and industrial and organizational psychology as well as business ethics on the micro and macro levels, organizational ethics is neither organizational behavior nor industrial and organizational psychology, nor is it solely business ethics (which includes corporate governance and corporate ethics). Organizational ethics express the values of an organization to its employees and/or other entities irrespective of governmental and/or regulatory laws.

Ethics are the principles and values used by an individual to govern their actions and decisions. An organization forms when individuals with varied interests and different backgrounds unite on a common platform and work together towards predefined goals and objectives. A code of ethics within an organization is a set of principles that is used to guide the organization in its decisions, programs, and policies. An ethical organizational culture consists of leaders and employees adhering to a code of ethics.

== Overview ==
An organization's ethical philosophy can affect the organization in many ways including its reputation, productivity, and bottom line. Ethics within an organization can offer many benefits. A positive ethical corporate culture improves the morale among the workers in an organization, which could increase productivity, employee retention and loyalty. Higher productivity improves the efficiency of the organizations and increased employee retention reduces the cost of replacing employees. Other essential benefits of an ethical culture include better internal communication and wider community development through corporate social responsibility. In the US, the Foreign Corrupt Practices Act restricts United States business firms from engaging in bribery and other illegal practices internationally. There are laws that have the same type of prohibition for European companies which creates a disadvantage competitively for both European and U.S. firms. Such laws are not a restricting element to organizations that have highly elevated ethical behavior as part of their values. Organizations that lack ethical practices as a mandatory basis of their business structure and corporate culture, have commonly been found to fail due to the absence of business ethics. Corporate downfalls would include, but are not limited to, the recent Enron and WorldCom scandals, two primary examples of unethical business practices concerning questionable accounting transactions.

Organizations focusing on encouraging ethical practices are commonly viewed with respect by their employees, the community, and corresponding industries. Ethical business practices of organizations have resulted in a solid financial bottom-line. This has been seen through greater sales and increased revenue by companies retaining talented personnel and attracting new skilled employees. More importantly, an ethical organization will have the ability to retain employees that are experienced and knowledgeable (generally referred to as human capital). This human capital results in less employee turnover, less training time for new employees, and greater output regarding services (or production of goods).

== Basic ethical elements ==
There are at least four elements that aim to create an ethical culture and behavior of employees within an organization. These elements are:

1. a written code of ethics and standards (ethical code)
2. ethics training for executives, managers, and employees
3. the availability of ethical situational advice (i.e. advice lines or offices)
4. confidential reporting systems

Organizations are constantly striving for a better ethical atmosphere within the business climate and culture. Businesses must create an ethical business climate in order to develop an ethical organization. Otherwise said, companies must focus on the ethics of employees in order to create an ethical business. Employees must know the difference between what is acceptable and unacceptable in the workplace. These standards are found in the written code of ethics or may be referred to as the employee handbook. These standards are a written form of employee conduct and performance expectations.

Employee handbooks also commonly include rules concerning expectations and consequences that follow misconduct. Handbooks normally will clearly state the rules, guidelines, and standards of an organization as well as possible rules, regulations, and laws that they are bound by. Many company handbooks will include laws regarding sexual harassment, alcohol abuse, and drug/substance abuse.
For more information regarding situational ethical principles, refer to "Situational Ethics."

== Intrinsic and extrinsic organizational rewards ==
The intrinsic and extrinsic rewards of an ethical organization are bound to an organization's culture and ethics. Based on the reliability and support structure of each of the four areas needed for ethical behavior, the organizational ethics will be evident throughout the organization. The organization including the employees, managers, suppliers, customers, and other entities, will receive intrinsic and extrinsic rewards. Actions of employees can range from whistle blowing (intrinsic) to the extraordinary actions of hourly employee purchasing all the recently produced peanut butter (as produced by his employer), that has no resale value due to mislabeled jars. This employee was aware that his employer (extrinsic) would reimburse him in full for purchasing the mislabeled peanut butter.
For more information regarding intrinsic and extrinsic motivation, see "Intrinsic and Extrinsic Motivation."

== Ethical theory and leadership empowerment ==
There are many theories and organizational studies that are related to “organizational ethics,” but "organizations" and "ethics" are wide and varied in application and scope. These theories and studies can range from individual(s), team(s), stakeholder, management, leadership, human resources, group(s) interaction(s), as well as the psychological framework behind each area to include the distribution of job tasks within various types of organizations. Among these areas, the influence of leadership in any organization cannot go unexamined, because of a clear understanding of the organization's vision, goals (including immediate and long-term strategic plans), and values. Leadership sets the tone for organizational management (strategic actions taken by an organization to create a positive image for both the internal and external public). In turn, leadership directly influences organizational symbolism (which reflects the culture, the language of the members, any meaningful objects, representations, and/or how someone may act or think within an organization). The values and ideals within an organization generally center upon “values for business” as the theoretical approach most leaders use to present to their "co-members" (which in truth may be subordinates).
In fact, an examination of business reveals that most leaders approach the X(?) from the perspective of values for the business. Alongside presenting the vision, values, and goals of the organization, the leader should infuse empowerment and motivation to its members. Leaders using empowerment to motivate their subordinates, is based upon the view of: “Achieving organizational ownership of company values is a continuous process of communication, discussion, and debate throughout all areas of the organization” as.
For more information about organization theory, refer to "Organizational Theory."

== Stakeholder theory ==
Whether it is a team, small group, or a large international entity, the ability of any organization to reason, act rationally, and respond ethically is paramount. Leaders must have the ability to recognize the needs and desires of members (or called “stakeholders” in some theories or models), and how they correspond to the organization. It is the stakeholder theory that implies that all stakeholders (or individuals) must be treated equally, regardless of the fact that some individuals will contribute more than others to the organization.
Leaders who motivate others must present the goals of an organization to the stakeholders with respect to particular benefits of the stakeholders. Leaders must set aside individual (or personal) ambitions (along with any prejudice) in order to present these goals properly. Furthermore, it is leadership that influences stakeholders towards ethical behavior for the organization. They must step behind a veil of ignorance and treat every stakeholder as a means with equal weight. Importantly, the leader (or stakeholder management) must possess the necessary skills and rank to ensure that each stakeholders voice is respected and heard within the organization to ensure that other voices are not expressing views (or needs as with respect to Maslow's Hierarchy of Needs). Therefore, stakeholder management must ensure an ethical system for their own management styles, personalities, systems, performances, plans, policies, strategies, productivity, openness, and even risk(s) within their cultures or industries.

== Ethical system implementation ==
The function of developing and implementing business ethics in an organization is difficult. Due to each organization's culture and atmosphere being different, there is no clear or specific way to implement a code of ethics in an existing business. Business ethics implementation can be categorized into two groups; formal and informal measures. Formal measures include training and courses pertaining to ethics. Informal measures are led by example from either the manager or the social norm of the company.

There are several steps to follow when trying to implement an ethical system. Some of these steps include obtaining a commitment from the board of directors and senior managers, developing resources for ethics initiatives, and determining ethical risks and developing contingency plans. Other steps include developing an ethics program that addresses risks while still maintaining compliance with the ethical standards, providing insight for implementation and audits of the ethical programs, and communicating with stakeholders to create shared commitment and values for ethical conduct.

The implementation should be performed to the entirety of the business including all areas of operations. If it is not implemented pragmatically and with caution for the needs, desires, and personalities (consider the Big Five personality traits) of the stakeholders, the culture, and the employees, then problems may arise. Although a great deal of time may be required, stakeholder management should consider the Rational Decision-Making Model for the implementation of various aspects, details, and standards of an ethical system to the stakeholders. If an implementation has been performed successfully, then all stakeholders have accepted the newly designed ethics system for the organization. With the implementation of an ethical system comes the implementation of new tasks and responsibilities. The responsibilities include leadership in ethics, delegating, and communicating as well as motivating the company's ethical position to its employees.

Some corporations have tried to burnish their ethical image by creating whistle-blower protections, such as anonymity. In the case of Citi, they call this the Ethics Hotline. Though it is unclear whether firms such as Citi take offences reported to these hotlines seriously or not.

== Theories and models ==
Refer to the following theories and models for more information:

- Stakeholder Theory
- Maslow's Hierarchy of Needs
- Rational Decision-Making Model
- Big Five Personality Traits

== See also ==
- Economics
- Ethic of reciprocity
- Functional leadership model
- Golden Rule
- Group Emotion
- Human factors
- Human Resources Development
- Human Resource Management
- Industrial Engineering
- Industrial Sociology
- Organization design
- Organizational development

== Notes ==
- Halbert, Terry, and Ingulli, Elaine, Law & Ethics in the Business Environment, 5th edition (2006). Mason, OH: Thomson Learning.
- Driscoll, Dawn-Marie and Hoffman, W. Michael, Ethics Matters: How to Implement Values-Driven Management (2000). Waltham, MA: Bently College Center for Business Ethics.
