= Leslie DeChurch =

Chair of the Department of Communication Studies at Northwestern University

Leslie A. DeChurch
- Born: September 27, 1974 (age 51); Hollywood, FL
- Citizenship: USA
- Education: University of Miami, Florida International University
- Scientific career
- Fields: Communication Studies, Industrial-Organizational Psychology, Space Psychology
- Workplaces: Northwestern University; Georgia Institute of Technology; University of Central Florida; Florida International University
- Academic advisors: Michelle A. Marks
- Website: atlas.northwestern.edu

Leslie A. DeChurch is an American academic and expert on leadership and team dynamics. She is Chair of the Department of Communication Studies at Northwestern University and holds a courtesy appointment in the Department of Psychology, Weinberg College of Arts & Sciences. She directs the ATLAS lab at Northwestern University, and is former President of the Interdisciplinary Network for Group Research (INGroup).

== Education ==
Professor DeChurch completed her Doctor of Philosophy degree in Industrial-Organizational (I-O) Psychology at the Florida International University (FIU) in Miami, Florida in 2002. Prior to this, she received a Master of Science degree in I-O Psychology from FIU in 2000 and a Bachelor of Science degree in Environmental Science from the University of Miami, Coral Gables, Florida.

== Career ==
=== Research ===
Professor DeChurch has published more than 50 research papers and chapters and 1 edited book in the areas of teams, leadership, and multiteam systems. She is a well-known expert on multiteam system functioning. Her research focuses on the dynamics through which teams form, and how these dynamics affect their performance as teams, and their ability to work as larger organizational systems (multiteam systems) including those with robots and autonomous agents. Her research seeks to build high-functioning teams that work in scientific innovation, space exploration, healthcare, and the military.

== Recognition ==
Professor DeChurch is a Fellow of the American Psychological Association (APA), the Association for Psychological Science (APS), and the Society for Industrial-Organizational Psychology (SIOP). She was awarded a National Science Foundation CAREER Award in 2011 to support her research on leadership for virtual organizational effectiveness.
