= Frances Arick Kolb =

American education consultant

- Born: 1937; Worcester, Massachusetts
- Died: January 12, 1991 (aged 53–54); Marlborough, Massachusetts
- Education: Washington University in St. Louis (BA; Ph.D); University of Pennsylvania (MA)
- Occupation: Education consultant

Frances Arick Kolb (1937 – January 12, 1991) was an American education consultant and activist. She worked as the assistant director of The Network and a consultant with the New Jersey Department of Education and the New England Educational Equity Center. She was a founder of the South Hills chapter of the National Organization for Women (NOW), the Eastern regional director and a member of the national board.

== Early life ==
Kolb was born in 1937 in Worcester, Massachusetts. Her mother was Beth Arick and her brother was Martin R. Arick. She was a student at Brandeis University between 1954 and 1956, although she ultimately graduated with a bachelors' of arts degree in history and secondary education from Washington University in St. Louis in 1958. She received a master's degree in American civilization in 1959 from the University of Pennsylvania before returning to Washington University to receive her Ph.D. in history in 1972.

== Career ==
Kolb began working at Pennsylvania State University in 1971 as a teacher in continuing education. She began working for the University of Pittsburgh in 1973, teaching American history. She was an assistant professor at Montclair State University between 1973 and 1975, and an adjunct professor specializing in women's studies at City College of New York between 1974 and 1975. She attended the 1975 national conference of the American Historical Association, serving as a member of a panel focused on teaching women's history, and attended the Berkshire Conference of Women Historians in June 1975 at Bryn Mawr College where she chaired a panel on funding women's studies.

She worked between 1975 and 1979 as a curriculum coordinator at the Training Institute for Sex Desegregation, which was affiliated with Douglass College at Rutgers University, and was a member of the planning committee of the college's Bicentennial Celebration on Women in March and April 1976. Kolb worked for the New Jersey Department of Education in June and July 1978 as a consultant at the Educational Improvement Center South. She was a consultant for the New England Educational Equity Center, which was a federal program funded by Title IX that assisted schools in sex desegregation, in 1979 and 1980. She was a training specialist with Project Inter-Action between 1980 and 1981, before joining The Network, Inc. in Andover, Massachusetts, in 1982 as their new assistant director. The latter organization was a non-profit focusing on research and training. Kolb advocated for textbooks that included the contributions of minorities and women. She produced the video "Breaking Through – Portraits of Winners" and wrote multiple books, including Portraits of Our Mothers; Using Oral History in the Classroom.

== Activism ==
Kolb was one of the founders of the South Hills chapter of the National Organization for Women (NOW) in Pittsburgh, as well as founding and serving as a director of the South Hills Now Day Nursery School between 1972 and 1973. She was the Eastern regional director from 1973 to 1975, during which time she chaired the regional conference held in Atlantic City in 1974 as the same weekend as the Miss America pageant, entitled 'Wonder Woman Conference; No Myth America'. She was also a member of the New Jersey chapter of NOW.

She was elected as an early national board member in 1975, emphasizing her goal of creating "a society free of sexism, racism, and classism". She held this role until 1977, also serving as the archivist for the organization. She was a member of the rules committee for the 1975 and 1976 national conferences, a member of the budget committee of the national board, the finance coordinator for the NOW Freedom Train in 1976, chair of the arrangements committee for the 1977 International Women's Year Conference, and the first chair of the economic sanctions committee of the ERA Strike Force between 1977 and 1979, which put pressure on states that had yet to ratify the Equal Rights Amendment (ERA). She served as a Bunting fellow at Schlesinger Library at the Radcliffe Institute for Advanced Study at Harvard University in 1979, writing a history of the first decade of NOW.

Kolb was also a member of the Pittsburgh chapter of the Women's Political Caucus (WPC), the National Council of Jewish Women in New Jersey, the Pittsburgh Association for the Advancement of Women, the Women's Liberation Group in East Lansing, Michigan, and chair of a committee on family planning in East Lansing.

== Personal life ==
Kolb married her first husband Zivon Cohen and, following their divorce, married Alfred Kolb, a professor at Quinsigamond Community College, with whom she had one daughter, Sharon. She died of breast cancer on January 12, 1991, at Marlborough Hospital in Marlborough, Massachusetts. Her papers are held by Schlesinger Library.
