= Multiteam system =

Multiteam systems (MTSs) are "two or more teams that interface directly and interdependently in response to environmental contingencies toward the accomplishment of collective goals. MTS boundaries are defined by virtue of the fact that all teams within the system, while pursuing different proximal goals, share at least one common distal goal; and in doing so, exhibit input, process and outcome interdependence with at least one other team in the system". Multiteam systems describe collections of teams that work toward a common goal. MTSs are often conceptualized as larger than a single team, but smaller than the organization within which they are embedded. In fact, MTSs often traverse organizations such that teams embedded within the same MTS may hail from multiple organizations. These systems of teams can be conceptualized as a special type of social network. In particular, MTSs are social networks whose boundaries are based on the shared interdependence of all members toward the accomplishment of a higher-order network-level goal. Multiteam systems are different from teams, because they are composed of multiple teams (called component teams) that must coordinate and collaborate. In MTSs, component teams each pursue proximal team goals (not shared with other teams in the system) and at the same time, work toward the larger system level goal. Because of this dual focus on team goals and systems goals, there are many situations where interventions aimed at improving the internal cohesion of teams will come at a cost to the larger goal. The past decade has witnessed an explosion of interest in the social sciences in understanding multiteam systems. MTSs are thought to explain the dynamics that arise in the public sector such as Provincial Reconstruction Teams, and in the private sector with strategic alliances.

== Examples ==
MTSs are highly visible in the public sector in the form of action teams such as emergency response teams. For instance, a hypothetical MTS could consist of 5 teams: police, firefighters, emergency medical technicians (EMTs), an emergency room team of surgeons, and a recovery team. Each of these teams has a specific, individual goal related to emergency response (i.e. the firefighters' primary goal is to extinguish the fire, while the EMTs' main objective is to rush injured people to the hospitalinferred.

== Gaming testbeds ==
"Computer-based simulations have been used to study MTSs in laboratory settings. Two that have been used frequently are ACES and DELTASim.

== ACES ==
Multi-team Air Campaign Effectiveness Simulation (ACES): ACES is a simulation developed in response to the numerous low-fidelity simulations used in psychological research that have limited external validity. It utilizes a PC-based flight simulation program called Total Air War (TAW), by Digital Image Design, Corp., in which players pilot a F-22 aircraft in the context of a fictional international conflict. In addition to the use of an adapted version of TAW, ACES captures records audio and video of participants, and participants communicate between- and within-groups through the use of microphone-equipped headsets. Up to 16 teams can play ACES at a time, and can be assigned different flight packages, weapons, and responsibilities. Team objectives can also be individual or related, depending on the manipulation. In addition, because ACES is a virtual simulation, teams can be remote.

== DELTASim ==
"DELTASim is a testbed developed by the DELTA research laboratory at the Georgia Institute of Technology. This PC-based simulation models a humanitarian aid multiteam system composed of two to three person component teams working on different functional tasks (e.g. special operations, mobile infantry) in different regions. The MTS goal of DELTASim is to enable a convoy of humanitarian aid trucks to move safely through a hostile area. The DELTASim has been reconfigured to run experiments using different communication modalities, leadership arrangements, degrees of trust, and communication networks within and across teams."

== Leadership of multiteam systems ==
Because of the complexity inherent within MTSs (including the possibility of competing component team goals), these systems present a unique challenge to leadership. Initial experimental results have demonstrated the importance to the success of such systems that component teams be synchronized such that both proximal team goals and higher-level collective outcomes are obtained. For example, laboratory research has demonstrated that effective interaction processes occurring between teams are more essential to MTS performance than are those interaction processes that occur within teams. In other words, component teams within an MTS each could be individually successful while the system as a whole fails to meet its objectives.

In recent team research, functional leadership theory has been presented as especially appropriate for conceptualizing the role of the team leader. This theory addresses the leader’s broad relationship to the team in that the core duty of the leader is "to do, or get done, whatever is not being adequately handled for group needs". The view of team leaders through the functional leadership lens has been extended to the MTS context in recent years. In particular, the MTS leader typically is responsible for interpreting and defining MTS task requirements. Additionally, MTS leadership, consistent with the functional leadership viewpoint, is conceptualized as including discretion and choice in the solutions applied to a given problem. For example, when requirements shift, as is the case in dynamically changing environments, and entrained team/MTS responses are no longer appropriate, MTS leaders must define/redefine directions (e.g. vision, task requirements) for the MTS. Marks and colleagues argued further that effective MTS leadership must balance the management of component team actions while maintaining cross-team interdependencies in response to environmental demands. In other words, MTS leaders must ensure that component team efforts throughout the system are aligned appropriately. Initial laboratory results indicate that MTS leaders can, in fact, be trained to enact functional MTS leader behaviors. In particular, DeChurch and Marks found that training manipulations, focused on leader strategizing and coordinating, enhanced functional MTS leadership behavior and interteam coordination and, in turn, enhanced MTS-level performance.

== See also ==
- Super-team

== Bibliography ==
- Balkundi, P.; Harrison, D.A. (2006). "Ties, leaders, and time in teams: Strong inference about network structure's effects on team viability and performance". Academy of Management Journal. 49: 49–68. doi:10.5465/amj.2006.20785500.
- DeChurch, L.A.; Marks, M.A. (2006). "Leadership in multiteam systems". Journal of Applied Psychology. 91 (2): 311–329. doi:10.1037/0021-9010.91.2.311. PMID 16551186.
- Hackman, J. Richard; Walton, Richard E. (1986). "Leading groups in organizations". In Goodman, P. S. (ed.). Designing effective work groups. Jossey-Bass.
- Lord, Robert G. (1977). "Functional Leadership Behavior: Measurement and Relation to Social Power and Leadership Perceptions". Administrative Science Quarterly. 22 (1). JSTOR: 114–133. doi:10.2307/2391749. ISSN 0001-8392. JSTOR 2391749.
- Marks, M.A.; DeChurch, L.A.; Mathieu, J.E.; Panzer, F.J. (2005). "Teamwork in multiteam systems". Journal of Applied Psychology. 90 (5): 964–971. doi:10.1037/0021-9010.90.5.964. PMID 16162068.
- Marks, M.A.; Luvison, Dave (2011). "Chapter 2: Product Launch and Strategic Alliance MTSs". In Zaccaro, S.J.; Marks, M.A.; DeChurch, L.A. (eds.). Multiteam systems: An organization form for complex, dynamic environments. Taylor & Francis. pp. 33–52. ISBN 978-1848728691.
- Mathieu, J.E.; Marks, M.A.; Zaccaro, S.J. (2001), "Multi-team systems", in N. Anderson; D. Ones; H.K. Sinangil; et al. (eds.), Handbook of Industrial, Work, and Organizational Psychology, vol. 2, London: Sage Publications, pp. 289–313
- Mathieu, J.E.; Cobb, M.G.; Marks, M.A.; Zaccaro, S.J.; Marsh, S. (2004), "Multi-Team ACES: A Research Platform for Studying Multi-Team Systems", in S.G. Schiflett; L.R. Elliot; E. Salas; et al. (eds.), Scaled Worlds: Development, Validation and Application, Aldershot, UK: Ashgate Publishing Limited, pp. 297–315
- McGrath, J. (1962). Leadership behavior: Some requirements for leadership training (Report). Washington, DC: U.S. Civil Service Commission.
- Wasserman, S.; Faust, K. (1994). Social Network Analysis: Methods and Applications. Structural Analysis in the Social Sciences. Cambridge University Press. ISBN 978-0-521-38707-1.
- Zaccaro, S.J.; Marks, M.A.; DeChurch, L.A., eds. (2011). Multiteam systems: An organization form for complex, dynamic environments. Taylor & Francis.
