= John Adair (author) =

British academic (1934–2025)

John Eric Adair (18 May 1934 – 1 November 2025) was a British academic who was a leadership theorist and author of more than 40 books (translated into 18 languages) on business, military and other leadership.

== Life and career ==
Adair was born in Luton and educated at St Paul's School before undertaking his national service as a second lieutenant in the Scots Guards from 1953 to 1955. Unusually, he served as adjutant of a Bedouin regiment in the Arab Legion and was briefly in command of the garrison of Jerusalem in the front line. He also studied at Hull Nautical College (where he qualified as an Arctic trawler deckhand in 1955) and Trinity Hall, Cambridge, obtaining his Bachelor of Arts degree in 1959. He later obtained a doctorate from King's College London in 1966 and a BLitt degree from Jesus College, Oxford, in 1971. He became a fellow of the Royal Historical Society in 1966. After working as a senior lecturer at the Royal Military Academy, Sandhurst from 1961 to 1967, he later worked for the Industrial Society before becoming professor of leadership studies at the University of Surrey in 1979, a post he held until 1984. He was a visiting professor at the University of Exeter from 1990 to 2000. He was a fellow of the Windsor Leadership Trust, where he regularly spoke on leadership development programmes. From 2006, he was honorary professor of leadership at the China Executive Leadership Academy in Pudong. In 2009, he was appointed chair of leadership studies at the United Nations System Staff College in Turin. He was president of Adair International.

Adair died on 1 November 2025, at the age of 91.

== Bibliography ==
- Roundhead General: The Campaigns of Sir William Waller (2nd ed.). 1997 [1962]. ISBN 978-0-7509-1312-6.
- Effective Teambuilding: How to Make a Winning Team (Revised ed.). Pan. 1987 [1968]. ISBN 0-330-29809-7.
- Effective Leadership (New ed.). Pan. 1988 [1983]. ISBN 0-330-30230-2.
- Effective Motivation. Pan. 1996. ISBN 0-330-34476-5.
- How to Grow Leaders: The Seven Key Principles of Effective Leadership Development. Kogan Page Ltd. 2006 [1996]. ISBN 0-7494-4839-3.
- Effective Communication. Pan. 1997. ISBN 0-330-34786-1.
- John Adair's 100 Greatest Ideas for Effective Leadership and Management (100 Greatest Ideas). Capstone Publishing Ltd. 2002 [2001]. ISBN 1-84112-140-1.
- Effective Strategic Leadership: An Essential Path to Success Guided by the World's Great Leaders (New ed.). Pan. 2003 [2002]. ISBN 0-330-48787-6.
- The Inspirational Leader: How to Motivate, Encourage and Achieve Success (New ed.). Kogan Page Ltd. 2005 [2003]. ISBN 0-7494-4456-8.
- The John Adair Handbook of Management and Leadership (New ed.). Thorogood. 2004. ISBN 1-85418-204-8.
- Effective Leadership Development. Adair J. CIPD. 2005. ISBN 1-84398-133-5.
- Adairs Leadership Development Activities Tool kit. Adair J CIPD. 2006. ISBN 1-84398-131-9.
- Leadership and Motivation: The Fifty-fifty Rule and the Eight Key Principles of Motivating Others. Kogan Page Ltd. 2007 [2006]. ISBN 978-0-7494-4798-4.
- The Leadership of Muhammad. Kogan Page. 2010. ISBN 978-0-7494-6076-1.

== See also ==
- Functional leadership model
