= Alasdair A. K. White =

British management theorist (born 1952)

Alasdair White
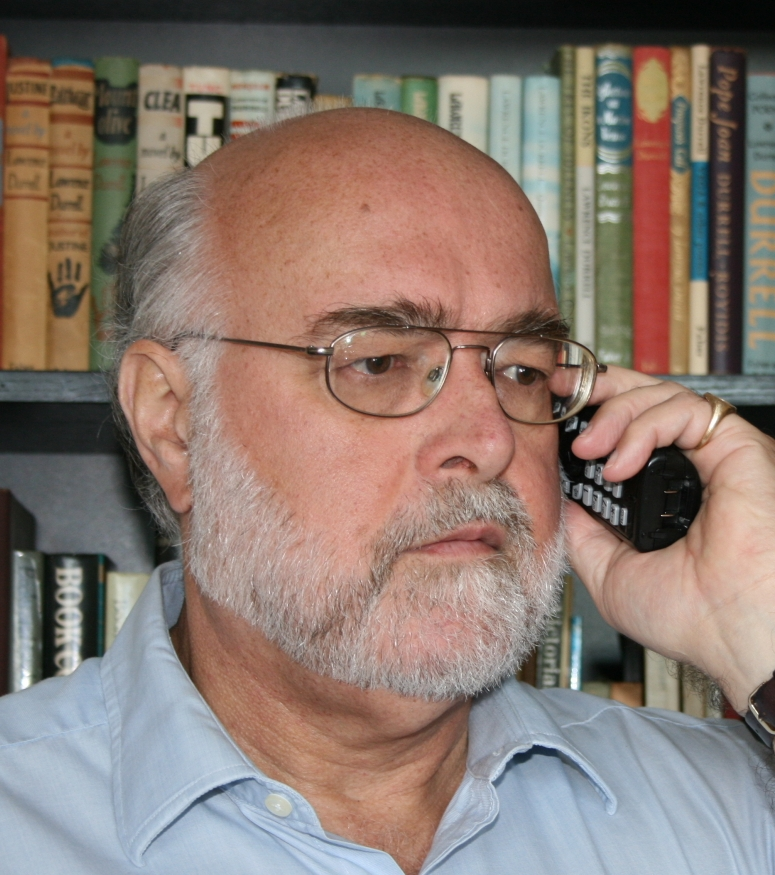
- Born: May 24, 1952 (age 74); England
- Known for: Performance management
- Scientific career
- Fields: Behavioural psychology

Alasdair Antony Kenneth White (born May 24, 1952) is a British management theorist best known for his work on performance management from a behavioural perspective and in the field of deconcentrated and networked organizations. Along with John Fairhurst, White developed the White-Fairhurst Performance Hypothesis relating to the performance life-cycle. He is also the author of Continuous Quality Improvement and The Essential Guide to Developing Your Staff.

== Research ==
In 2006, he worked closely with John Fairhurst and, following various observational studies, they formulated the White-Fairhurst Performance Hypothesis which states that "all performance will initially trend towards a steady state, particularly after a period of performance uplift, and that steady state will then develop a downward curve leading to a significant performance decline".

White-Fairhurst TPR Model

In a paper entitled From Comfort Zone to Performance Management, White examines the hypothesis from a theoretical perspective starting with the Comfort Zone Theory and the work of Robert Yerkes and John Dodson, David McClelland et al., the Tuckman Model and Colin Carnall. This theoretical examination leads White to conclude that the White-Fairhurst Hypothesis broadly holds true and the performance curve is as demonstrated in the White-Fairhurst TPR Life-cycle Model (TPR stands for Transforming, Performing, Reforming). There has been some criticism of White’s approach, suggesting that more recent sources and work would have been more appropriate, but none have been able to offer a counter-argument or to adequately refute or dispute the hypothesis. The fact remains that most of the fundamentals of performance behaviour were established in the last century and that the more recent work is itself based on this earlier work.

White argues that what is important now is to determine trend-change points on the performance curve so that the most appropriate performance management actions can be applied. He conducted research within a university environment in this relation to this and the result is recorded in his 2008 essay Managing Academic Performance the underlying theory of which underpins the approach being adopted by a number of academic institutions.

== Writing ==
In addition to writing on management issues, White is also active in writing and editing fiction for White & MacLean Publishing. Among those writings include the a political and action novel Shadows, written under the pen-name of Alex Hunter.
