= Guy Benveniste =

American organization theorist (1927–2022)

Guy Benveniste (February 27, 1927 - December 3. 2022) was an organization theorist who has written about the politics of planning and ways of encouraging bureaucracies to be more adaptive to change.

== Early life ==
Benveniste was born in Paris, France, on February 27, 1927. He left Vichy France in May 1942 to take refuge in Mexico. He attended Harvard University, where he received a BS and MS in engineering in 1948 and 1950. He worked as a construction engineer and an economist for the Mexican Light and Power Company before emigrating to the United States in 1954. He then joined the Stanford Research Institute in Menlo Park, California, where he undertook economic studies including the economics of solar energy and later became involved in economic development in third world countries.

In 1961, at the beginning of the Kennedy administration, he was named to a task force on the reorganization of the US AID agency. He joined the Kennedy administration in December 1961 working in the State Department on cultural and educational issues.

Benveniste joined the staff of the World Bank in mid-1962 when the Bank began financing education projects in developing countries. He went to Afghanistan and participated in justifying one of the Bank's first low-interest loans for education made to that country. In 1963, the Bank transferred him to Paris. Later that year he joined UNESCO, where he was instrumental in the creation of the UNESCO International Institute for Educational Planning. He remained there until 1965.

Benveniste then obtained a PhD at Stanford University in the sociology of planning and was appointed to the faculty of the Graduate School of Education at the University of California at Berkeley in 1968.

== Intellectual legacy ==
=== Planning theory ===
While at Berkeley, Benveniste published a series of books on the sociology of planning and bureaucracy. His Politics of Expertise and subsequent volumes analyzed the process of planning or of giving technical advice. Benveniste argued that planners and experts had to consider political realities in the context of their technical arguments if their plans were not to be shelved or stay in limbo. In this way, he was an early proponent of and contributor to the literature on the problems of implementing ideas into action.

His first paper on the sociology of planning was published in 1968. He and other early writers argued that planners needed more than a good understanding of the technical problems of planning. They needed to understand the political and organizational context in which planning took place. Benveniste provided a theoretical argument to help articulate the technical reality to its political and organizational context. His work was always somewhat controversial since it suggested bending some truth to power.

His publications span a quarter century. His first book, an analysis of planning in Mexico, was published in 1970. He was one of the first contributors to a better understanding of the political dimensions of planning and reform. As such his work received considerable attention at the time. He thus criticized the rational planning model and contributed to a better understanding of the urban planning process. Later, Benveniste espoused a far more active political role for planners in his Mastering the Politics of Planning (1994). This work received considerable attention, and a 1993 issue of the journal Planning Theory with nine articles was devoted to it.

=== Organization theory ===
Benveniste's contributions to organizational theory included Bureaucracy, published in 1977 and subsequent volumes. Because of his interest with planners he focused on professionals and their roles in rapidly changing environments. In these works, Benveniste focused on the concept of profession and on the role of professionals in creating more flexible and adaptive organizations. He attempted to show that by giving more discretion to better-trained professionals it was possible to decentralize control in organizations. His The Twenty First Century Organization, published in 1994, was translated and published in China.

== Later life ==
Benveniste remained on the faculty at the University of California at Berkeley until his retirement in 1993. He then spent time painting and had several shows. For several years, he was represented in the Artist Gallery at the San Francisco Museum of Modern Art.
