= The Network, Inc. =

Technology Company

The Network, Inc. is a technology and services company that develops and delivers integrated GRC solutions designed to help organizations mitigate risk and promote organizational compliance. The network's solutions are proprietary SaaS-based technology. The company uses the phrase "Protect, Detect, Correct" to describe its solutions.

The Network's current client base includes approximately 3,400 global organizations across a wide variety of industries, representing almost 27 million employees worldwide.

== History ==
The Network was founded in 1982 by Ralph Childs, a former FBI Special Agent, who implemented the first 24/7 anonymous reporting system that allows employees to bring unethical and illegal activities to their employers’ attention without fear of reprisal. Childs, then principal of security consulting firm Childs Associates, incorporated the new venture under the name National Business Crime Information Network, Inc., which soon became known by the shortened name, The Network. Soon thereafter, the company realized the need to make all employees more aware of organizational ethics programs and initiated a series of awareness and communications products (Prevention SystemSM), as well as ethics training materials, to meet these requirements.

== NetClaim ==
In the mid-1990s, The Network expanded its hotline reporting system to include claims reporting for worker compensation and other similar issues. The system it developed to manage claims reporting, NetClaim, remains a viable part of the company’s market mix.

== Incident management ==
In 2005, the company developed its Case Management system (now known as Incident Management), which streamlined the incident and issue management process for corporate investigators and case managers. In May 2010, an enhanced version of the software was released as a replacement of the legacy system.

== Product development ==
In 2011, the company expanded its existing ethics and compliance training offerings with interactive web-based training offerings. That same year, the company introduced an enhanced version of its platform-level Reporting & Analytics engine.

In April 2012, the company released its Policy Management solution, which enables organizations to use platform-level collaboration tools to create, distribute, and manage company policies, track employee attestation, and know which version of a policy was in effect at any given time. In 2013, the company introduced a companion product to the Incident Management solution, CAPA/Remediation, designed to manage investigative follow-up and remedial tasks, as well as a Compliance Management solution designed for compliance risk assessment and employee survey management.

In February 2013, a research firm (GRC 20/20 Research) awarded a Technology Innovator Award to The Network for the company's Integrated GRC Suite, a SaaS-based GRC system designed to deliver seamless native integration of enterprise-level compliance data and provide visibility between incidents, cases, policies, courses, and corrective or preventive action plans. GRC 20/20's chief analyst, Michael Rasmussen, referred to the Integrated GRC Suite as the "Apple of GRC" for its "design and end user experience."

== Compliance benchmarking ==
Since 2006, the company has released an annual Corporate Governance and Compliance Hotline Benchmarking Report, which provides a statistical study of fraud reporting trends across a range of industries and corporate demographics. The 2013 report revealed that incident reporting rates continued to climb, and that 72 percent of participants did not notify management of an issue before submitting a hotline report.

== Products ==
The company markets proprietary solutions which include:

- Integrated GRC Solutions Suite
  - Policy Management – policy management
  - Training & Communications – interactive ethics and compliance courses courseware
  - Compliance Management - confidential phone- and web-based incident reporting (hotline), proactive risk assessments and surveys
  - Incident Management – centralized event and incident management
  - CAPA/Remediation – corrective and preventive action planning, root cause analysis
  - Reporting and Analytics – advanced analytics and data visualization engine
- Creative Services - awareness and communications programs
- Code of Conduct services – writing, design, refresh
- NetClaim® – claims reporting
- Professional Services – implementation, training and client support

== Market and industry recognition ==
The Network has received design and writing awards for its awareness, training and communications, and code of conduct services, including:

- 2008 Stevie Award Winner (American Business Awards) for Best Professional Education - Interactive Multimedia: "Ethics Idol - Episode 2: Hiring Family Members"
- 2011 Stevie Award Finalist (American Business Awards) for Best Professional Education - Interactive Multimedia
- 2012 IABC Gold Quill Award for Creative Communications
- 2013 IAVA Communicator Silver Award of Distinction
- 2013 Horizon Award

== Affiliations ==
- Ethics and Compliance Officer Association (ECOA)
- Open Compliance & Ethics Group (OCEG) – Enterprise Member
- Society of Corporate Compliance and Ethics (SCCE)
- Society for Human Resource Management (SHRM) – Associate-level
