= High-performance team =

Concept within organization development

In organization development, a high-performance team (HPT) is a team, organization, or virtual group that is highly focused on their goals and that achieves superior business results. High-performance teams outperform all other similar teams and they outperform expectations given their composition.

== Definition ==
A high-performance team can be defined as a group of people with specific roles and complementary talents and skills, aligned with and committed to a common purpose, who consistently show high levels of collaboration and innovation, produce superior results, and extinguish radical or extreme opinions that could be damaging. The high-performance team is regarded as tight-knit, focused on their goal and have supportive processes that will enable any team member to surmount any barriers in achieving the team's goals.

Within the high-performance team, people are highly skilled and are able to interchange their roles. Also, leadership within the team is not vested in a single individual. Instead the leadership role is taken up by various team members, according to the need at that moment in time. High-performance teams have robust methods of resolving conflict efficiently, so that conflict does not become a roadblock to achieving the team's goals. There is a sense of clear focus and intense energy within a high-performance team. Collectively, the team has its own consciousness, indicating shared norms and values within the team. The team feels a strong sense of accountability for achieving their goals. Team members display high levels of mutual trust towards each other.

To support team effectiveness within high-performance teams, understanding of individual working styles is important. This can be done by applying Belbin High Performing Teams, DISC assessment, the Myers-Briggs Type Indicator and the Herrmann Brain Dominance Instrument to understand behavior, personalities and thinking styles of team members.

Using Tuckman's stages of group development as a basis, a HPT moves through the stages of forming, storming, norming and performing, as with other teams. However, the HPT uses the storming and norming phase effectively to define who they are and what their overall goal is, and how to interact together and resolve conflicts. Therefore, when the HPT reaches the performing phase, they have highly effective behaviours that allow them to overachieve in comparison to regular teams. Later, leadership strategies (coordinating, coaching, empowering, and supporting) were connected to each stage to help facilitate teams to high performance.

Characteristics

Different characteristics have been used to describe high-performance teams. Despite varying approaches to describing high-performance teams, there is a set of common characteristics that are recognised to lead to success

- Participative leadership – using a democratic leadership style that involves and engages team members
- Effective decision-making – using a blend of rational and intuitive decision making methods, depending on the nature of the decision task
- Open and clear communication – ensuring that the team mutually constructs shared meaning, using effective communication methods and channels
- Valued diversity – valuing a diversity of experience and background in the team, contributing to a diversity of viewpoints, leading to better decision making and solutions
- Mutual trust – trusting in other team members and trusting in the team as an entity
- Managing conflict – dealing with conflict openly and transparently and not allowing grudges to build up and destroy team morale
- Clear goals – goals that are developed using SMART criteria; also each goal must have personal meaning and resonance for each team member, building commitment and engagement
- Defined roles and responsibilities – each team member understands what they must do (and what they must not do) to demonstrate their commitment to the team and to support team success
- Coordinative relationship – the bonds between the team members allow them to seamlessly coordinate their work to achieve both efficiency and effectiveness
- Positive atmosphere – an overall team culture that is open, transparent, positive, future-focused and able to deliver success

There are many types of teams in organizations as well. The most traditional type of team is the manager-led team. Within this team, a manager fits the role of the team leader and is responsible for defining the team goals, methods, and functions. The remaining team members are responsible for carrying out their assigned work under the monitoring of the manager. Self-managing or self-regulating teams operate when the “manager” position determines the overall purpose or goal for the team and the remainder of the team are at liberty to manage the methods needed to achieve the intended goal. Self-directing or self-designing teams determine their own team goals and the different methods needed in order to achieve the end goal. This offers opportunities for innovation, enhancing goal commitment and motivation. Finally, self-governing teams are designed with high control and responsibility to execute a task or manage processes. The board of directors is a prime example of self-governing team.

Given the importance of team-based work in today's economy, much focus has been placed in recent years to use evidence-based organizational research to more accurately pinpoint the defining attributes of high-performance teams. The team at MIT's Human Dynamics Laboratory investigated explicitly observable communication patterns and found energy, engagement, and exploration to be surprisingly powerful predictive indicators for a team's ability to perform.

Other researchers focus on what supports group intelligence and allows a team to be smarter than their smartest individuals. A group at MIT's Center for Collective Intelligence, e.g., found that teams with more women and teams where team members share "airtime" equally showed higher group intelligence scores.

The Fundamental Interpersonal Relations Orientation – Behavior (FIRO-B) questionnaire is a resource that could help the individual identify their personal orientation. In other words, the behavioral tendency of a person in different environments, with different people. The theory of personal orientation was initially shared by Schultz (1958) who claimed personal orientation consists of three fundamental human needs: need for inclusion, need for control, and the need for affection. The FIRO-B test helps an individual identify their interpersonal compatibilities with these needs which can be directly correlated to their performance in a high-performance team.

== Historical development of concept ==
First described in detail by the Tavistock Institute, UK, in the 1950s, HPTs gained popular acceptance in the US by the 1980s, with adoption by organizations such as General Electric, Boeing, Digital Equipment Corporation (now HP), and others. In each case, major change was created through the shifting of organizational culture, merging the business goals of the organization with the social needs of the individuals. Often within less than a year, HPTs achieved a quantum leap in business results in all key success dimensions, including customer, employee, shareholder, and operational value-added dimensions.

Due to its initial success, many organizations attempted to copy HPTs. However, without understanding the underlying dynamics that created them, and without adequate time and resources to develop them, most of these attempts failed. As a result of these failures, HPTs fell out of general favor by 1995, and the term high-performance began to be used in a promotional context, rather than a performance-based one.

Recently, some private sector and government sector organizations have placed new focus on HPTs, as new studies and understandings have identified the key processes and team dynamics necessary to create all-around quantum performance improvements. With these new tools, organizations such as Kraft Foods, General Electric, Exelon, and the US government have focused new attention on high-performance teams.

In Great Britain, high-performance workplaces are defined as being those organizations where workers are actively communicated with and involved in the decisions directly affecting the workers. By regulation of the UK Department of Trade and Industry, these workplaces will be required in most organizations by 2008

== See also ==
- Stakhanovite movement
