= Patrick Lencioni =

American author

- Occupation: Writer, speaker
- Genre: Business, leadership, organizational health
- Notable works: The Five Dysfunctions of a Team; The Advantage; The Ideal Team Player

Website
- tablegroup.com/pat

Patrick Lencioni (born c. 1965) is an American author of books on business management, particularly in relation to team management. He is best known as the author of The Five Dysfunctions of a Team, a popular business fable that explores work team dynamics and suggests methods to help teams perform better. He has also applied his management techniques to families in The Three Big Questions for a Frantic Family.

== Career ==
Lencioni is president of The Table Group, a management consulting firm specializing in executive team development and organizational health. As a consultant and speaker, he has worked with senior executives and executive teams in organizations ranging from Fortune 500s and high tech start-ups to universities and non-profits. He also gives talks on leadership, organizational change, teamwork and corporate culture. He has been interviewed for features in the Wall Street Journal and USA Today. CNN Money listed him in 2008 as one of "10 new gurus you should know".

Previously, Lencioni worked at the management consulting firm Bain & Company, Oracle Corporation, and Sybase, where he was VP of Organization Development.

== Personal life ==
Lencioni grew up in Bakersfield, California. He lives in Alamo, California, in the San Francisco Bay Area. He is married and has four sons.

== Books ==
- Lencioni, Patrick. 1998. The Five Temptations of a CEO: A Leadership Fable. Jossey-Bass. ISBN 9780787944339
- Lencioni, Patrick. 2000. The Four Obsessions of an Extraordinary Executive: A Leadership Fable. Jossey-Bass. ISBN 978-0787954031
- Lencioni, Patrick. 2002. The Five Dysfunctions of A Team. Jossey-Bass. ISBN 978-0787960759
- Lencioni, Patrick. 2004. Death by Meeting: A Leadership Fable...About Solving the Most Painful Problem in Business. Jossey-Bass. ISBN 978-0787968052
- Lencioni, Patrick. 2005. Overcoming the Five Dysfunctions of a Team: A Field Guide for Leaders, Managers, and Facilitators. Jossey-Bass. ISBN 978-0787976378
- Lencioni, Patrick. 2006. Silos, Politics and Turf Wars: A Leadership Fable About Destroying the Barriers That Turn Colleagues Into Competitors. Jossey-Bass. ISBN 978-0787976385
- Lencioni, Patrick. 2007. The Truth About Employee Engagement: A Fable About Addressing the Three Root Causes of Job Misery (originally titled The Three Signs of a Miserable Job: A fable for managers and their employees). Jossey-Bass. ISBN 978-1119237983
- Lencioni, Patrick. 2008. The 3 Big Questions for a Frantic Family: A Leadership Fable... About Restoring Sanity To The Most Important Organization In Your Life. Jossey-Bass. ISBN 978-0787995324
- Lencioni, Patrick. 2010. Getting Naked: A Business Fable About Shedding The Three Fears That Sabotage Client Loyalty. Jossey-Bass. ISBN 978-8126528295
- Lencioni, Patrick. 2012. The Advantage: Why Organizational Health Trumps Everything Else In Business. Jossey-Bass. ISBN 978-0470941522
- Lencioni, Patrick. 2016. The Ideal Team Player: How to Recognize and Cultivate The Three Essential Virtues. Jossey-Bass. ISBN 978-1119209591
- Lencioni, Patrick. 2020. The Motive: Why So Many Leaders Abdicate Their Most Important Responsibilities. Jossey-Bass. ISBN 978-1119600459
- Lencioni, Patrick. 2022. The 6 Types of Working Genius. Matt Holt Books. ISBN 978-1637743294

== See also ==
- Dave Ramsey
- John C. Maxwell
- Leadership
