= Functional leadership model =

Theory of Leadership

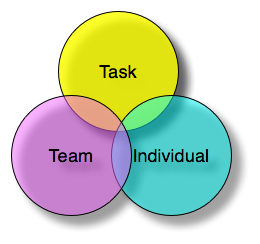
John Adair's Action Centred Leadership Model

Functional leadership theory (Hackman & Walton, 1986; McGrath, 1962) is a theory for addressing specific leader behaviors expected to contribute to organizational or unit effectiveness. This theory argues that the leader's main job is to see that whatever is necessary to group needs is taken care of; thus, a leader can be said to have done their job well when contributing to group effectiveness and cohesion.

Functional leadership theories are developed by studying successful leaders and identifying the actions and behaviors they show. Extensive studies with a large amount of data make it possible to correlate what leaders do, i.e., their actions or functions, with their successful results.

The Functional theory of leadership emphasizes how an organization or task is being led rather than who has been formally assigned a leadership role. In the functional leadership model, leadership does not rest with one person but rests on a set of behaviors by the group that gets things done. Any group member can perform these behaviors so that any member can participate in leadership.

One of the best-known and most influential functional theories of leadership, used in many leadership development programs, is John Adair's "Action-Centred Leadership".

== History ==
In the 1970s, John Adair developed a model of Action-Centred Leadership comprising 3 interlocking balls in a venn diagram arrangement, labelled Task, Team and Individual on the premise that:

- the Task can only be performed by the team and not by one person
- the Team can only achieve excellent task performance if all the individuals are fully developed
- the Individuals need the task to be challenged and motivated

Adair's model challenged trait theory by focusing on what leaders do. He showed that leadership could be taught and did not depend on a person's traits.

== The eight functions of leadership ==
Adair noted the following 8 key functions for which team leaders are responsible. (Examples are given in brackets)

1. Defining the task, (by setting clear objectives through SMART goals)
2. Planning, (by looking at alternative ways to achieve the task and having contingency plans in case of problems)
3. Briefing the team, (by creating the right team climate, fostering synergy, and making the most of each individual through knowing them well)
4. Controlling what happens, (by being efficient in terms of getting maximum results from minimum resources)
5. Evaluating results, (by assessing consequences and identifying how to improve performance)
6. Motivating individuals, (by using both external motivators such as rewards and incentives as well as eliciting internal motivators on the part of each team player)
7. Organizing people, (by organizing self and others through good time management, personal development, and delegation)
8. Setting an example, (by recognizing that people observe their leaders and copy what they do).

== Criticism of the model ==
Some people consider Adair's Three Circles Model too simplistic and outdated as it was developed in the 1970s. However, the British Armed Forces (Army, Navy and Air Force), 50 years since its creation, still use it as the basis of all their leadership development programs.

== Implications for the nature versus nurture debate ==
Whether leaders are born or made is part of the question of whether human behavior is due to nature or nurture. It is a short leap from functional leadership theory to the belief that if one person can do something, others can also learn to do it. The implication that leaders are made and not necessarily born with the necessary traits for leadership opened up the possibility of leadership development.
