= Leigh Thompson (psychologist) =

Professor at Northwestern University

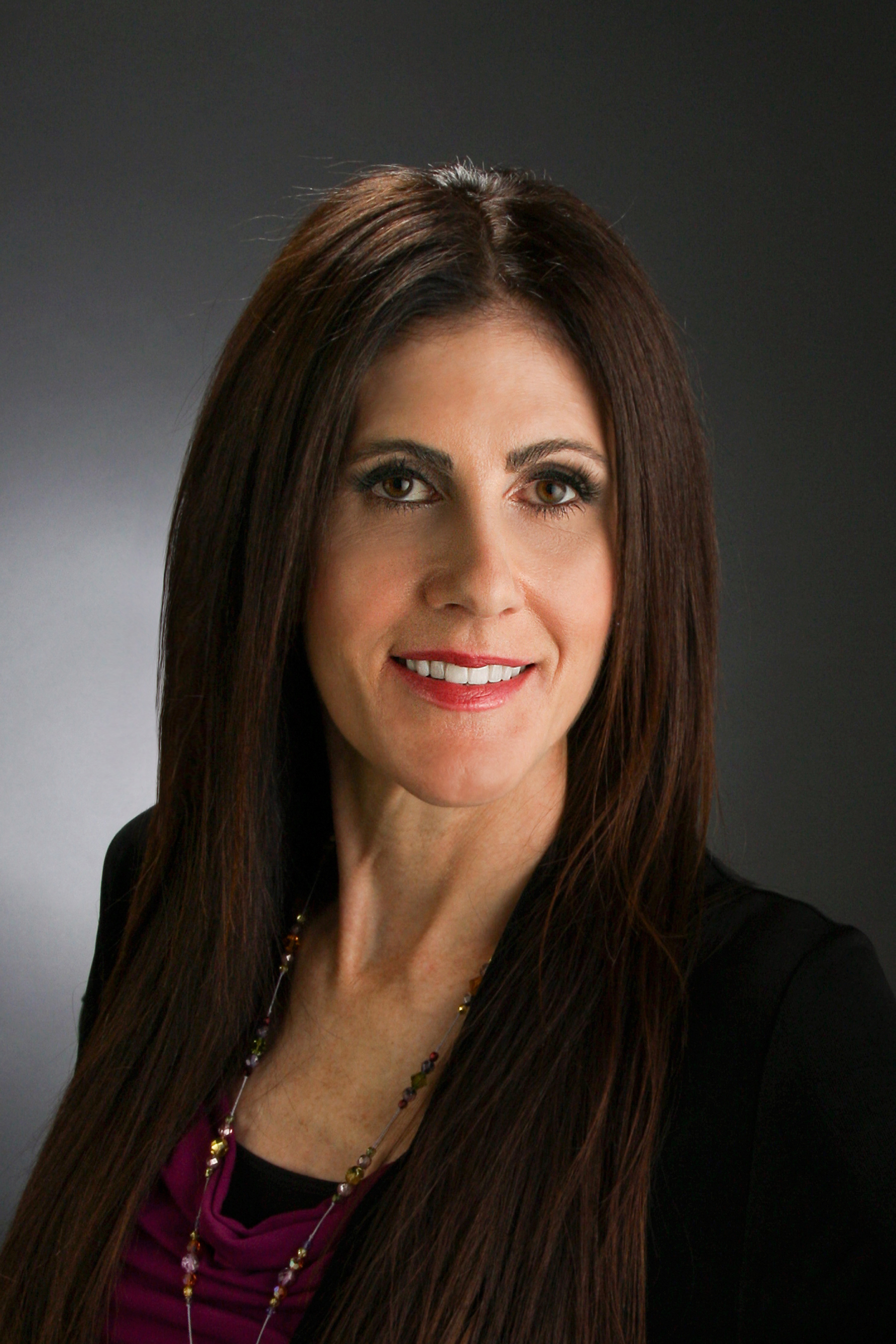
- Title: J. Jay Gerber Professor of Dispute Resolution & Organizations

Academic background
- Education: B.S. Speech; M.A. Education; Ph.D. Psychology
- Alma mater: Northwestern University (B.S. & Ph.D.); University of California, Santa Barbara (M.A.)

Academic work
- Institutions: Northwestern University
- Notable works: Making the Team: A Guide for Managers; The Mind And Heart of the Negotiator
- Website: http://www.leighthompson.com

Leigh Thompson is an American author and academic. She is the J. Jay Gerber Professor of Dispute Resolution & Organizations in the Kellogg School of Management at Northwestern University.

Thompson's research has been focused on the topics of negotiation, group decision making, analogical reasoning and creativity. She is the author and editor of eleven books including Negotiating the Sweet Spot: The Art of Leaving Nothing on the Table, Creative Conspiracy: The New Rules of Breakthrough Collaboration, Stop Spending, Start Managing: Strategies to Transform Wasteful Habits, Making the Team: A Guide for Managers, The Mind And Heart of the Negotiator and The Truth about Negotiation.

Thompson is a fellow of the Association for Psychological Science. As of 2025, Thompson's work has been cited 10,600 times according to Scopus.

== Education ==
Thompson received a B.S. in speech from Northwestern University in 1982 followed by an M.A. in education from University of California, Santa Barbara in 1984. Subsequently, she returned to Northwestern University, where she received her Ph.D. in psychology in 1988.

== Career ==
After completing her Ph.D., Thompson joined the University of Washington as an assistant professor of psychology. In 1994, she had a one-year fellowship at the Center for Advanced Study in the Behavioral Sciences. She left University of Washington in 1995 to join Northwestern University as the John L. & Helen Kellogg Distinguished Professor of Management and Organizations and an adjunct professor of psychology. In 2001, she was endowed the J. Jay Gerber Distinguished Professorship of Dispute Resolution and Organizations at Northwestern.

== Research and work ==
Thompson's research is focused on the topics of creativity, innovation, teamwork, social psychology and negotiation.

In 1998, Thompson wrote the book The Mind and Heart of the Negotiator, which discusses how people can negotiate better. In 2000, she wrote the book, Making the Team: A Guide for Managers. The book explains how teams should be designed to function optimally. It also highlights the skills needed to become a productive part of a team.

In 2008, Thompson wrote the book The Truth About Negotiations. She is the author of the 2013 book The Creative Conspiracy: The New Rules of Breakthrough Collaboration. In the book she described collaborations that are conscious, planned and focused on creativity as a creative conspiracy.

In 2018, she conducted further research on how negotiation differs for men and women. Her research highlighted that men lie in negotiations more often than women because men approach negotiation as a competition whereas women approach it as an opportunity to build connection.

== Personal life ==
Thompson is an avid cyclist. She is a USA cycling national time trial champion. In 2010, she won a masters time trial championship at the world level.

== Awards and honors ==
- 1996 - Fellow, Association for Psychological Science

== Books ==
- Shared Cognition in Organizations: The Management of Knowledge. 1999. ISBN 978-0805828917.
- Tools for Teams. 2000. ISBN 978-0536622365.
- The Social Psychology of Organizational Behavior. 2002. ISBN 978-1841690841.
- Creativity and Innovation in Organizational Teams. 2005. ISBN 978-0805849684.
- Negotiation Theory and Research. 2006. ISBN 978-1841694160.
- Organizational Behavior Today. 2007. ISBN 978-0131858114.
- Conflict in Organizational Groups: New Directions in Theory and Practice. 2007. ISBN 978-0810124578.
- The Truth About Negotiations (2nd ed.). 2013. ISBN 978-0133353440.
- Creative Conspiracy: The New Rules of Breakthrough Collaboration. 2013. ISBN 978-1422173343.
- Stop Spending, Start Managing: Strategies to Transform Wasteful Habits. 2016. ISBN 978-1422143025.
- Making the Team: A Guide for Managers (6th ed.). 2017. ISBN 978-0134484204.
- The Mind And Heart of the Negotiator (7th ed.). 2019. ISBN 978-0135198582.
- Negotiating the Sweet Spot: The Art of Leaving Nothing on the Table. 2020. ISBN 978-1400217434.
