= Rational planning model =

Model of the planning process

The rational planning model is a model of the planning process involving a number of rational actions or steps. Taylor (1998) outlines five steps, as follows:

- Definition of the problems and/or goals;
- Identification of alternative plans/policies;
- Evaluation of alternative plans/policies;
- Implementation of plans/policies;
- Monitoring of effects of plans/policies.

The rational planning model is used in planning and designing neighborhoods, cities, and regions. It has been central in the development of modern urban planning and transportation planning. The model has many limitations, particularly the lack of guidance on involving stakeholders and the community affected by planning, and other models of planning, such as collaborative planning, are now also widely used.

The very similar rational decision-making model, as it is called in organizational behavior, is a process for making logically sound decisions. This multi-step model aims to be logical and follow the orderly path from problem identification through solution. Rational decision making is a multi-step process for making logically sound decisions that aims to follow the orderly path from problem identification through solution.

== Method ==
Rational decision-making or planning follows a series of steps detailed below:

=== Verify, define, detail the problem, give solution or alternative to the problem ===
Verifying, defining & detailing the problem (problem definition, goal definition, information gathering). This step includes recognizing the problem, defining an initial solution, and starting primary analysis. Examples of this are creative devising, creative ideas, inspirations, breakthroughs, and brainstorms.

The very first step which is normally overlooked by the top level management is defining the exact problem. Though we think that the problem identification is obvious, many times it is not. When defining the problem situation, framing is an essential part of the process. With correct framing, the situation is identified and possible previous experience with same kind of situation can be utilized. The rational decision making model is a group-based decision making process. If the problem is not identified properly then we may face a problem as each and every member of the group might have a different definition of the problem.

=== Generate all possible solutions ===
This step encloses two to three final solutions to the problem and preliminary implementation to the site. In planning, examples of this are Planned Units of Development and downtown revitalizations.

This activity is best done in groups, as different people may contribute different ideas or alternative solutions to the problem. Without alternative solutions, there is a chance of arriving at a non-optimal or a rational decision. For exploring the alternatives it is necessary to gather information. Technology may help with gathering this information.

=== Generate objective assessment criteria ===
Evaluative criteria are measurements to determine success and failure of alternatives. This step contains secondary and final analysis along with secondary solutions to the problem. Examples of this are site suitability and site sensitivity analysis. After going thoroughly through the process of defining the problem, exploring for all the possible alternatives for that problem and gathering information this step says evaluate the information and the possible options to anticipate the consequences of each and every possible alternative that is thought of. At this point optional criteria for measuring the success or failure of the decision taken needs to be considered. The rational model of planning rest largely on objective assessment.

=== Choose the best solution generated ===
This step comprises a final solution and secondary implementation to the site. At this point the process has developed into different strategies of how to apply the solutions to the site.

Based on the criteria of assessment and the analysis done in previous steps, choose the best solution generated. These four steps form the core of the Rational Decision Making Model.

=== Implement the preferred alternative ===
This step includes final implementation to the site and preliminary monitoring of the outcome and results of the site. This step is the building/renovations part of the process.

=== Feedback ===
Modify future decisions and actions taken based on the above evaluation of outcomes.

== Discourse of rational planning model used in policy making ==
The rational model of decision-making is a process for making sound decisions in policy making in the public sector. Rationality is defined as “a style of behavior that is appropriate to the achievement of given goals, within the limits imposed by given conditions and constraints”. The model makes a series of assumptions in order for it to work, such as:

- The model must be applied in a system that is stable,
- The government is a rational and unitary actor and that its actions are perceived as rational choices,
- The policy problem is unambiguous,
- There are no limitations of time or cost.

Some of the assumptions identified above are also pointed out in a study written by the historian H.A. Drake, as he states:

In its purest form, the Rational Actor approach presumes that such a figure [as Constantine] has complete freedom of action to achieve goals that he or she has articulated through a careful process of rational analysis involving full and objective study of all pertinent information and alternatives. At the same time, it presumes that this central actor is so fully in control of the apparatus of government that a decision once made is as good as implemented. There are no staffs on which to rely, no constituencies to placate, no generals or governors to cajole. By attributing all decision making to one central figure who is always fully in control and who acts only after carefully weighing all options, the Rational Actor method allows scholars to filter out extraneous details and focus attention on central issues.

Furthermore, in the context of policy, rational models are intended to achieve maximum social gain. For this purpose, Simon identifies an outline of a step by step mode of analysis to achieve rational decisions. Ian Thomas describes Simon's steps as follows:

1. Intelligence gathering— data and potential problems and opportunities are identified, collected and analyzed.
2. Identifying problems
3. Assessing the consequences of all options
4. Relating consequences to values— with all decisions and policies there will be a set of values which will be more relevant (for example, economic feasibility and environmental protection) and which can be expressed as a set of criteria, against which performance (or consequences) of each option can be judged.
5. Choosing the preferred option— given the full understanding of all the problems and opportunities, all the consequences and the criteria for judging options.

In similar lines, Wiktorowicz and Deber describe through their study on ‘Regulating biotechnology: a rational-political model of policy development’ the rational approach to policy development. The main steps involved in making a rational decision for these authors are the following:

1. The comprehensive organization and analysis of the information
2. The potential consequences of each option
3. The probability that each potential outcome would materialize
4. The value (or utility) placed on each potential outcome.

The approach of Wiktorowicz and Deber is similar to Simon and they assert that the rational model tends to deal with “the facts” (data, probabilities) in steps 1 to 3, leaving the issue of assessing values to the final step. According to Wiktorowicz and Deber values are introduced in the final step of the rational model, where the utility of each policy option is assessed.

Many authors have attempted to interpret the above-mentioned steps, amongst others, Patton and Sawicki who summarize the model as presented in the following figure (missing):

1. Defining the problem by analyzing the data and the information gathered.
2. Identifying the decision criteria that will be important in solving the problem. The decision maker must determine the relevant factors to take into account when making the decision.
3. A critical analyses and evaluation of each criterion is brought through. For example, strength and weakness tables of each alternative are drawn and used for comparative basis. The decision maker then weights the previously identified criteria in order to give the alternative policies a correct priority in the decision.
4. The decision-maker evaluates each alternative against the criteria and selects the preferred alternative.
5. The policy is brought through.

The model of rational decision-making has also proven to be very useful to several decision making processes in industries outside the public sphere. Nonetheless, many criticisms of the model arise due to claim of the model being impractical and lying on unrealistic assumptions. For instance, it is a difficult model to apply in the public sector because social problems can be very complex, ill-defined and interdependent. The problem lies in the thinking procedure implied by the model which is linear and can face difficulties in extra ordinary problems or social problems which have no sequences of happenings. This latter argument can be best illustrated by the words of Thomas R. Dye, the president of the Lincoln Center for Public Service, who wrote in his book `Understanding Public Policy´ the following passage:

There is no better illustration of the dilemmas of rational policy making in America than in the field of health…the first obstacle to rationalism is defining the problem. Is our goal to have good health — that is, whether we live at all (infant mortality), how well we live (days lost to sickness), and how long we live (life spans and adult mortality)? Or is our goal to have good medical care — frequent visits to the doctor, wellequipped and accessible hospitals, and equal access to medical care by rich and poor alike?

The problems faced when using the rational model arise in practice because social and environmental values can be difficult to quantify and forge consensus around. Furthermore, the assumptions stated by Simon are never fully valid in a real world context.

However, as Thomas states the rational model provides a good perspective since in modern society rationality plays a central role and everything that is rational tends to be prized. Thus, it does not seem strange that “we ought to be trying for rational decision-making”.

=== Decision criteria for policy analysis — Step 2 ===
As illustrated in Figure 1, rational policy analysis can be broken into 6 distinct stages of analysis. Step 2 highlights the need to understand which factors should be considered as part of the decision making process. At this part of the process, all the economic, social, and environmental factors that are important to the policy decision need to be identified and then expressed as policy decision criteria. For example, the decision criteria used in the analysis of environmental policy is often a mix of —

- Ecological impacts — such as biodiversity, water quality, air quality, habitat quality, species population, etc.
- Economic efficiency — commonly expressed as benefits and costs.
- Distributional equity — how policy impacts are distributed amongst different demographics. Factors that can affect the distribution of impacts include location, ethnicity, income, and occupation.
- Social/Cultural acceptability — the extent to which the policy action may be opposed by current social norms or cultural values.
- Operational practicality — the capacity required to actually operationalize the policy.
- Legality — the potential for the policy to be implemented under current legislation versus the need to pass new legislation that accommodates the policy.
- Uncertainty — the degree to which the level of policy impacts can be known.

Some criteria, such as economic benefit, will be more easily measurable or definable, while others such as environmental quality will be harder to measure or express quantitatively. Ultimately though, the set of decision criteria needs to embody all of the policy goals, and overemphasising the more easily definable or measurable criteria, will have the undesirable impact of biasing the analysis towards a subset of the policy goals.

The process of identifying a suitably comprehensive decision criteria set is also vulnerable to being skewed by pressures arising at the political interface. For example, decision makers may tend to give "more weight to policy impacts that are concentrated, tangible, certain, and immediate than to impacts that are diffuse, intangible, uncertain, and delayed."^8. For example, with a cap-and-trade system for carbon emissions the net financial cost in the first five years of policy implementation is a far easier impact to conceptualise than the more diffuse and uncertain impact of a country's improved position to influence global negotiations on climate change action.

=== Decision methods for policy analysis — Step 5 ===
Displaying the impacts of policy alternatives can be done using a policy analysis matrix (PAM) such that shown in Table 1. As shown, a PAM provides a summary of the policy impacts for the various alternatives and examination of the matrix can reveal the tradeoffs associated with the different alternatives.

Table 1. Policy analysis matrix (PAM) for SO2 emissions control.

Once policy alternatives have been evaluated, the next step is to decide which policy alternative should be implemented. This is shown as step 5 in Figure 1. At one extreme, comparing the policy alternatives can be relatively simple if all the policy goals can be measured using a single metric and given equal weighting. In this case, the decision method is an exercise in benefit cost analysis (BCA).

At the other extreme, the numerous goals will require the policy impacts to be expressed using a variety of metrics that are not readily comparable. In such cases, the policy analyst may draw on the concept of utility to aggregate the various goals into a single score. With the utility concept, each impact is given a weighting such that 1 unit of each weighted impact is considered to be equally valuable (or desirable) with regards to the collective well-being.

Weimer and Vining also suggest that the "go, no go" rule can be a useful method for deciding amongst policy alternatives^8. Under this decision making regime, some or all policy impacts can be assigned thresholds which are used to eliminate at least some of the policy alternatives. In their example, one criterion "is to minimize SO2 emissions" and so a threshold might be a reduction SO2 emissions "of at least 8.0 million tons per year". As such, any policy alternative that does not meet this threshold can be removed from consideration. If only a single policy alternative satisfies all the impact thresholds then it is the one that is considered a "go" for each impact. Otherwise it might be that all but a few policy alternatives are eliminated and those that remain need to be more closely examined in terms of their trade-offs so that a decision can be made.

=== Case study of rational policy analysis ===
To demonstrate the rational analysis process as described above, let’s examine the policy paper “Stimulating the use of biofuels in the European Union: Implications for climate change policy” by Lisa Ryan where the substitution of fossil fuels with biofuels has been proposed in the European Union (EU) between 2005–2010 as part of a strategy to mitigate greenhouse gas emissions from road transport, increase security of energy supply and support development of rural communities.

Considering the steps of Patton and Sawicki model as in Figure 1 above, this paper only follows components 1 to 5 of the rationalist policy analysis model:

1. Defining The Problem – the report identifies transportation fuels pose two important challenges for the European Union (EU). First, under the provisions of the Kyoto Protocol to the Climate Change Convention, the EU has agreed to an absolute cap on greenhouse gas emissions; while, at the same time increased consumption of transportation fuels has resulted in a trend of increasing greenhouse gas emissions from this source. Second, the dependence upon oil imports from the politically volatile Middle East generates concern over price fluctuations and possible interruptions in supply. Alternative fuel sources need to be used & substituted in place of fossil fuels to mitigate GHG emissions in the EU.
2. Determine the Evaluation Criteria – this policy sets Environmental impacts/benefits (reduction of GHG’s as a measure to reducing climate change effects) and Economical efficiency (the costs of converting to biofuels as alternative to fossil fuels & the costs of production of biofuels from its different potential sources) as its decision criteria. However, this paper does not exactly talk about the social impacts, this policy may have. It also does not compare the operational challenges involved between the different categories of biofuels considered.
3. Identifying Alternative Policies – The European Commission foresees that three alternative transport fuels: hydrogen, natural gas, and biofuels, will replace transport fossil fuels, each by 5% by 2020.
4. Evaluating Alternative Policies – Biofuels are an alternative motor vehicle fuel produced from biological material and are promoted as a transitional step until more advanced technologies have matured. By modelling the efficiency of the biofuel options the authors compute the economic and environmental costs of each biofuel option as per the evaluation criteria mentioned above.
5. Select The Preferred Policy – The authors suggest that the overall best biofuel comes from the sugarcane in Brazil after comparing the economic & the environmental costs. The current cost of subsidising the price difference between European biofuels and fossil fuels per tonne of CO_{2} emissions saved is calculated to be €229–2000. If the production of European biofuels for transport is to be encouraged, exemption from excise duties is the instrument that incurs the least transactions costs, as no separate administrative or collection system needs to be established. A number of entrepreneurs are producing biofuels at the lower margin of the costs specified here profitably, once an excise duty rebate is given. It is likely that growth in the volume of the business will engender both economies of scale and innovation that will reduce costs substantially.

== Requirements and limitations ==
However, there are a lot of assumptions, requirements without which the rational decision model is a failure. Therefore, they all have to be considered. The model assumes that we have or should or can obtain adequate information, both in terms of quality, quantity and accuracy. This applies to the situation as well as the alternative technical situations. It further assumes that you have or should or can obtain substantive knowledge of the cause and effect relationships relevant to the evaluation of the alternatives. In other words, it assumes that you have a thorough knowledge of all the alternatives and the consequences of the alternatives chosen. It further assumes that you can rank the alternatives and choose the best of it. The following are the limitations for the Rational Decision Making Model:

- requires a great deal of time
- requires great deal of information
- assumes rational, measurable criteria are available and agreed upon
- assumes accurate, stable and complete knowledge of all the alternatives, preferences, goals and consequences
- assumes a rational, reasonable, non – political world

== Current status ==
While the rational planning model was innovative at its conception, the concepts are controversial and questionable processes today. The rational planning model has fallen out of mass use as of the last decade. Rather than conceptualising human agents as rational planners, Lucy Suchman argues, agents can better be understood as engaging in situated action. Going further, Guy Benveniste argued that the rational model could not be implemented without taking the political context into account.

== See also ==
- Rationality and power

== Sources ==
- See working paper #2 at http://ewp.uoregon.edu/publications/working
