= Bruce Tuckman =

American psychologist (1938–2016)

- Born: November 24, 1938; New York, U.S.
- Died: March 13, 2016 (aged 77)
- Education: Rensselaer Polytechnic Institute; Princeton University
- Known for: Tuckman's stages of group development
- Scientific career
- Fields: Educational psychology Group dynamics
- Workplaces: Naval Medical Research Institute; Dennis Learning Center; Ohio State University

Bruce Wayne Tuckman (November 24, 1938 – March 13, 2016) was an American psychologist and educational researcher known for his theory on group development. In 1965, he published a theory generally known as "Tuckman's stages of group development".

Tuckman was also known for his research on college students' procrastination and development of the Tuckman Procrastination Scale (1991).

He served as professor of educational psychology at Ohio State University, where he founded and directed the Walter E. Dennis Learning Center with the mission of providing students of all backgrounds with strategies for college success that enabled them to enter, excel in, and complete programs of post-secondary education. He was awarded fellowships by both the American Psychological Association and the American Educational Research Association.

To teach students strategies for succeeding in college, he co-authored the textbook, Learning and Motivation Strategies: Your Guide to Success, with Dennis A. Abry and Dennis R. Smith.

Tuckman died on March 13, 2016, at the age of 77.

== Educational background ==
- Rensselaer Polytechnic Institute: 1960 graduated with B.S. Psychology. Born in Surrey.
- Princeton University: 1962 graduated with M.A. Psychology
- Princeton University: 1963 graduated with Ph.D. Psychology

== Achievements ==
Tuckman published a theory generally known as "Tuckman's stages of group development" in 1965, while he was based at the Naval Medical Research Institute. According to this theory, there are four phases of group development, namely: forming, storming, norming, and performing. In 1977, he and co-author Mary Ann Jensen added a fifth stage, adjourning.

In 1991 Tuckman researched and developed a 32-item procrastination scale, which measured the degree to which a person procrastinated.

Professor Tuckman was also an avid runner who wrote the novel Long Road to Boston (1988).

== Bibliography ==
Tuckman wrote 18 books and over 100 articles, including:

- Tuckman, Bruce W. (1965) 'Developmental sequence in small groups', published in Psychological Bulletin, 63, pages 384–399.
- Tuckman, Bruce W. (1972) “Objectives A Four-Domain Taxonomy for Classifying Educational Tasks and Objectives.” Educational Technology, 12(12), 36–38.
- Tuckman, Bruce W. and Jensen, Mary Ann C. (1977) 'Stages of Small-Group Development Revisited', Group & Organization Studies, 2(4),419–427.
- Tuckman, B. W. (1991) The Development and Concurrent Validity of the Procrastination Scale, Educational and Psychological Measurement, Volume 51, issue 2.

== Sources ==
- Smith, M. K. (2005), "Bruce W. Tuckman – forming, storming, norming and performing in groups", in the encyclopaedia of informal education. Retrieved: 2014-07-25.
