= The Five Dysfunctions of a Team =

Book by Patrick Lencioni

- Author: Patrick Lencioni
- Language: English
- Genre: Business, marketing, management, teamwork
- Published: 2002 (Jossey-Bass)
- Publication place: United States
- Media type: Print (hardcover)
- Pages: 229
- ISBN: 978-0-7879-6075-9

The Five Dysfunctions of a Team is a business book by consultant and speaker Patrick Lencioni first published in 2002. It describes many pitfalls that teams face as they seek to "grow together". This book explores the fundamental causes of organizational politics and team failure. Like most of Lencioni's books, the bulk of it is written as a business fable.

The issues it describes were considered especially important to team sports. The book's lessons were applied by several coaches to their teams in the National Football League in the United States.

== Summary ==
According to the book, the five dysfunctions are:

- Absence of trust: unwilling to be vulnerable within the group
- Fear of conflict: seeking artificial harmony over constructive passionate debate
- Lack of commitment: feigning buy-in for group decisions creates ambiguity throughout the organization
- Avoidance of accountability: ducking the responsibility to call peers, superiors on counterproductive behavior which sets low standards
- Inattention to team results: focusing on personal success, status and ego before team success

== Dramatis personae ==
- Kathryn Petersen, newly appointed chief executive officer of fictional company DecisionTech, Inc.
- Jeff Shanley, former CEO, cofounder, head of business development.
- Michele (Mikey) Bebe, head of marketing.
- Martin Gilmore, chief technologist.
- Jeff (JR) Rawlins, head of sales.
- Carlos Amador, head of customer support.
- Jan Mersino, chief financial officer.
- Nick Farrell, chief operating officer.

== Reviews ==
This book has appeared on American best-seller lists including: The New York Times Best Seller list, Business Week, Wall Street Journal and USA Today. Other reviews appeared in the periodicals:

- Harvard Business Review; Apr2002, Vol. 80 Issue 4, p28, John T. Landry
- Publishers Weekly March 25, 2002 v249 i12 p54(1),
- Greater Baton Rouge Business Report Jan 21, 2003 v21 i10 p29(1), Jack Covert
- Booklist April 1, 2002 v98 i15 p1288(1)
- Library Journal April 15, 2002 v127 i7 p102(1)
- CMA Management July–August 2002 v76 i5 p6(1)
- Canadian Manager Fall 2002 v27 i3 p31(1)

== Criticism ==
Gordon Curphy and Robert Hogan, both organizational psychologists and leadership researchers, provide a critical perspective on Lencioni's team model in their book The Rocket Model: Practical Advice for Building High Performing Teams. While they clearly emphasize The Five Dysfunctions of a Team's contributions to the field they also point out major drawbacks of the model:

"Lencioni's model provides useful insights about team dynamics and has some advantages over the other models. The model is straightforward, identifies many of the reasons why teams fail, and offers practical advice on how to build high-functioning teams. Lencioni also deserves credit for pointing out the following:

1. The importance of the "first team".
2. The need for leaders to teach teams how to win.
3. The recognition of time wasted avoiding conflict.
4. Cascading effect of leadership team dynamics.

The simplicity of the Five Dysfunctions model and key insights make it popular among human resource professionals and team consultants. Nonetheless, Lencioni's book is explicitly a work of fiction; it is not based on research and its practical recommendations lack empirical support. For example, when the trust level among team members is low, Lencioni recommends that leaders put them through a series of personal disclosures. However, there is little likelihood that these activities can build trust in dysfunctional work teams. According to Katzenbach and Smith, the only effective method for teams to build trust and cohesion is to do real work. Similar problems afflict the four other dysfunctions."
