= Tuckman's stages of group development =

Model of group development

The forming–storming–norming–performing model of group development was first proposed by Bruce Tuckman in 1965, who said that these phases are all necessary and inevitable in order for a team to grow, face up to challenges, tackle problems, find solutions, plan work, and deliver results. He suggested that these inevitable phases were critical to team growth and development. This series of developmental stages has become known as the Tuckman Ladder.

Tuckman hypothesized that along with these factors, interpersonal relationships and task activity would enhance the four-stage model that he first proposed as needed to successfully navigate and create an effective group function.

== Research process ==
Tuckman reviewed a collection of fifty published articles concerned with group development over a period of time in order to classify the types of study they related to, group purpose and a hypothesized series of stages. The articles referred to studies of groups working together within a variety of therapeutic and professional settings, and to groups with inter-personal development as their purpose and groups with other task purposes. It was his analysis of these fifty articles which led Tuckman to formulate his four-stage model.

== Group development ==
=== Forming ===
The team meets and learns about the opportunities and challenges, and then agrees on goals and begins to tackle the tasks. Team members tend to behave quite independently. They may be motivated but are usually relatively uninformed of the issues and objectives of the team. Team members are usually on their best behavior but very focused on themselves. Mature team members begin to model appropriate behavior even at this early phase. The meeting environment also plays an important role to model the initial behavior of each individual. The major task functions also concern orientation. Members attempt to become oriented to the tasks as well as to one another. This is also the stage in which group members test boundaries, create ground rules, and define organizational standards. Discussion centres on defining the scope of the task, how to approach it, and similar concerns. To grow from this stage to the next, each member must relinquish the comfort of non-threatening topics and risk the possibility of conflict.

=== Storming ===
This is the second stage of team development, where the group starts to sort itself out and gain each other's trust. This stage often starts when they voice their opinions; conflict may arise between team members as power and status are assigned. When group members start to work with each other they start to learn about individual working styles and what it is like to work with each other as a team; it also identifies the hierarchy of positions in the group. At this stage there is often a positive and polite atmosphere, people are pleasant to each other, and they may have feelings of excitement, eagerness and positivity. Others may have feelings of suspicion, fear and anxiety. The leader of the team will then describe the tasks to the group, describe the different behaviours to the group and how to deal and handle complaints. In this stage "participants form opinions about the character and integrity of the other participants and feel compelled to voice these opinions if they find someone shirking responsibility or attempting to dominate. Sometimes participants question the actions or decision of the leader as the expedition grows harder". Disagreements and personality clashes must be resolved before the team can progress out of this stage, and so some teams may never emerge from "storming" or re-enter that phase if new challenges or disputes arise. In Tuckman's 1965 paper, only 50% of the studies identified a stage of intragroup conflict, and some of the remaining studies jumped directly from stage 1 to stage 3.

=== Norming ===
"Resolved disagreements and personality clashes result in greater intimacy, and a spirit of co-operation emerges." This happens when the team is aware of competition and they share a common goal. In this stage, all team members take responsibility and have the ambition to work for the success of the team's goals. They start tolerating the whims and fancies of the other team members. They accept others as they are and make an effort to move on. The danger here is that members may be so focused on preventing conflict that they are reluctant to share controversial ideas.

=== Performing ===
"With group norms and roles established, group members focus on achieving common goals, often reaching an unexpectedly high level of success." By this time, they are motivated and knowledgeable. The team members are now competent, autonomous and able to handle the decision-making process without supervision. Dissent is expected and allowed as long as it is channelled through means acceptable to the team.

Supervisors of the team during this phase are almost always participating. The team will make most of the necessary decisions. Even the most high-performing teams will revert to earlier stages in certain circumstances. Many long-standing teams go through these cycles many times as they react to changing circumstances. For example, a change in leadership may cause the team to revert to storming as the new people challenge the existing norms and dynamics of the team.

== Further developments ==
=== Adjourning ===
In 1977, Tuckman, jointly with Mary Ann Jensen, added a fifth stage to the four stages: adjourning, that involves completing the task and breaking up the team (in some texts referred to as "mourning"). After being invited by the journal Group and Organizational Studies to publish an update of the model, they revisited the original model and reviewed 22 further studies published after the initial model appeared. They concluded that an important step in the small group life cycle was the ultimate separation which occurred at the end of this cycle. This final stage involves the disbanding of the team after achieving its goals. Members reflect on their accomplishments and experiences, often experiencing mixed emotions.

=== Norming and re-norming ===
Timothy Biggs suggested that an additional stage be added of "norming" after "forming" and renaming the traditional norming stage "re-norming". This addition is designed to reflect that there is a period after forming where the performance of a team gradually improves, and the interference of a leader who is content with that level of performance will prevent a team from progressing through the storming stage to true performance. This puts the emphasis back on the team and leader, as the storming stage must be actively engaged in order to succeed – too many "diplomats" or "peacemakers", especially in a leadership role, may prevent the team from reaching their full potential.

Rickards and Moger proposed a similar extension to the Tuckman model when a group breaks out of its norms, through a process of creative problem-solving.

=== White-Fairhurst TPR model ===
Alasdair White and his colleague John Fairhurst examined Tuckman's development sequence when developing their own White-Fairhurst "Transforming, Performing, Reforming" (TPR) model. They simplify the sequence and group the forming-storming-norming stages together as the "transforming" phase, which they equate with the initial performance level. This is then followed by a "performing" phase, which leads to a new performance level which they call the "reforming" phase. Their work was developed further by White in his essay "From Comfort Zone to Performance Management", in which he demonstrates the linkage between Tuckman's work and that of Colin Carnall's "coping cycle" and the "comfort zone theory".

=== Leadership strategies to facilitate successful team development ===
A healthcare research study "Maximizing Team Performance: The Critical Role of the Nurse Leader" examined the role of nursing leaders in facilitating the development of high performing change teams using the Tuckman model of group development as a guiding framework. Using qualitative research techniques, these authors linked the team development stages to leadership strategies, as well as identified keys to leader success. Some examples from the article:

Team development stage	Leadership strategies	Keys to success
Forming (setting the stage)	Coordinating behaviors	Purposefully picking the team; Facilitating team to identify goals; Ensuring the team development of a shared mental model
Storming (resolving conflict and tension)	Coaching behaviors	Acting as a resource person to the team; Developing mutual trust; Calming the work environment
Norming and performing (successfully implementing and sustaining projects)	Empowering behaviors	Getting feedback from staff; Allowing for the transfer of leadership; Setting aside time for planning and engaging the team
Outperforming and adjourning (expanding initiative and integrating new members)	Supporting behaviors	Allowing for flexibility in team roles; Assisting in the timing and selection of new member; Creating future leadership opportunities

=== Adaptations for project management ===
In project management, the Tuckman Ladder is referenced and used extensively by project managers to help them assemble and guide teams toward success. In project management, the Tuckman Ladder's phases are not always realized in a linear fashion; it is common for teams to progress to the next phase and then wind up back at a previous phase as the project timeline progresses.

== See also ==
- Group dynamics
