= Full range leadership model =

Theory of leadership

Sketch of the three sub-types of leadership styles occurring within the full range of leadership model. Abscissa is the engagement by the leader (from passive to active), ordinate is the effectiveness.

The full range of leadership model (FRLM) is a general leadership theory focusing on the behavior of leaders towards the workforce in different work situations. The FRLM relates transactional and transformational leadership styles with laissez-faire leadership style.

The concepts of three distinct leadership styles — transactional, transformational, and laissez-faire — were introduced in 1991 by Bruce Avolio and Bernard Bass

== Three leadership styles ==
As shown in the figure, the three leadership styles can be sorted according to a leader's engagement towards their team. The Multifactor Leadership Questionnaire is the most popular way to identify leadership style. The 7th factor correlates with Laissez-faire leadership, while contingent reward and management by exception align with transactional management, and the last 4 describe transformational leaders.

=== Laissez-faire ===
Laissez-faire is French for "Let them do (what they want)". This style is the least active way of leading people. This leadership style can be seen as the absence of leadership, and is characterized by an attitude avoiding any responsibility. Decision-making is left to the employees themselves, and no rules are fixed. Laissez-faire is the least effective leadership style, when measured by the impact of the leader's opinion on the team.

=== Transactional ===
In transactional leadership, leaders promote compliance by followers through both rewards and punishments. Unlike transformational leaders, those using the transactional approach are not looking to change the future, they aim to keep things the same. Transactional leaders pay attention to followers' work in order to find faults and deviations. Transactional leadership style may be appropriate in static environment, in mature industries, and in organisations that are performing well.

A transactional leader follows the objective exchange of value between an employee's performance and the manager's response to it. The manager communicates clear requirements and goals to the employee and rewards achievements. Some authors define transactional leadership as a "conditional reward" – the definition of the goal is negotiated between the manager and the employee, and in the event of a successful performance by the employee, the reward promised by the manager is granted.

=== Transformational ===
In contrast to the two above leadership styles, transformational leadership follows a different, more long-term oriented philosophy: Short-term, egotistic goals, are substituted by long-term, higher-ranked values and ideals. This paradigm change usually increases commitment, self-confidence, and employee satisfaction. Transformational leadership style may be appropriate in turbulent environments, in industries at the very start or end of their life cycles, in poorly performing organisations when there is a need to inspire a company to embrace major changes. Podsakoff and colleagues distinguish six dimensions of transformational leadership:

1. Role model
2. Future vision
3. Individual support
4. Promotion of group goals
5. Intellectual stimulation
6. High performance expectation

== See also ==
- Management
- Leadership
- Transactional leadership
- Transformational leadership
- Management by objectives
- Management by observation
