= Psychological Capital Questionnaire =

- Purpose: introspective psychological inventory

The Psychological Capital Questionnaire (PCQ) is an introspective psychological inventory consisting of 24 items pertaining to an individual's Psychological Capital (PsyCap), or positive psychological state of development. The PCQ was constructed by Fred Luthans, Bruce J. Avolio, and James B. Avey with the goal to assess the dimensions of PsyCap. The PCQ measures four dimensions of PsyCap: hope, efficacy, resiliency, and optimism. The PCQ takes between 10–15 minutes to complete and can be administered to individuals or groups. The PCQ is protected by copyright law and published by Mind Garden, Inc.

Note: The term "PsyCap" refers to the whole of four specific constructs: hope, efficacy, resiliency, and optimism. The term "PCQ" refers to the 24 specific questions used to measure hope, efficacy, resiliency, and optimism.

== Psychological Capital ==
Psychological Capital (PsyCap) is one of the resources (or "capitals") that are required for organizations of all types seeking sustainable growth and competitive advantage. Other types of capital include human capital, social capital, and economic capital. Defined by Luthans and Carolyn M. Youssef, PsyCap is "an individual's positive psychological state of development and is characterized by: (1) having confidence (self-efficacy) to take on and put in the necessary effort to succeed at challenging tasks; (2) making a positive attribution (optimism) about succeeding now and in the future; (3) persevering towards goals and, when necessary, redirecting paths to goals (hope) in order to succeed; and (4) when beset by problems and adversity, sustaining and bouncing back and even beyond (resilience) to attain success" (Luthans, Youssef, & Avolio, 2007, p. 3). Hope, efficacy, resiliency, and optimism - known as the "HERO Within" - are the resources that make up the value of PsyCap.

PsyCap was conceptualized as a result of growing literature around positive organizational behavior (POB), or "the study and application of positive oriented human resource strengths and psychological capacities that can be measured, developed, and effectively managed for performance improvement" (Luthans, 2002, p. 59). Because of POB, psychological well-being has shown to moderate the relationship between job satisfaction-job performance and job satisfaction-employee turnover, as well as have strong positive relationships with performance at work and successful relationships. It has been utilized in settings such as administration, communication, education, and more.

Although PsyCap is usually applied to formal organizational settings, Wayne F. Cascio and Luthans (2014) applied the principles of PsyCap in their retrospective analysis of prisoners in the notorious South African prison, Robben Island, to argue that PsyCap was the key to enabling the prisoners (such as Nelson Mandela and Jacob Zuma) to survive, resist, and effectuate change to prison life and their guards.

Hope: The construct called "hope" was developed by Charles R. Snyder and has two components: agency (willpower) and pathways. Hope enables the individual to have the agency to set and pursue meaningful goals and facilitates generating multiple pathways to reach those goals in case of obstacles. Hope is the "will" to succeed and the ability to identify, clarify, and pursue the "way" to success.

Efficacy: The construct called "efficacy" is defined as the "employee's conviction or confidence about his or her abilities to mobilize the motivation, cognitive resources or courses of action needed to successfully execute a specific task within a given context."

Resilience: The construct called "resilience" is characterized as positive coping and adaptation in the face of risk or adversity. It is the "positive psychological capacity to rebound, to 'bounce back' from adversity, uncertainty, conflict, failure, or even positive change, progress, and increased responsibility" (Luthans, 2002, p. 702). Resilient people tend to have a resolute acceptance of reality, a deep belief that life is meaningful, and an ability to improvise and adapt to change.

Optimism: The construct called "optimism" is associated with having a positive outcome, outlook, or attribution, including positive emotions and motivations, while maintaining a realistic outlook. Optimism was first explained by Martin Seligman, whereby optimists are defined as those who make internal, stable, and global attributions of positive events and external, unstable, and specific attributions of negative events. A second perspective on optimism is whereby optimists are defined as those who expect that a desirable outcome will result from their increased effort, and will continue to put fort effort even in the face of adversity.

== Psychological Capital Questionnaire Scales ==
The PCQ consists of four scales with six items each. Higher scores correspond to greater psychological capital abilities.

Hope: This six-item scale measures an individual's ability to persevere towards goals and redirect paths to goals in order to succeed.

Efficacy: This six-item scale measures an individual's ability to have confidence to take on and put in the necessary effort to succeed at challenging tasks.

Resilience: This six-item scale measures an individual's ability to sustain and bounce back when beset by problems and adversity to attain success.

Optimism: This six-item scale measures an individual's ability to make a positive attribution and expectation about succeeding now and in the future.

== Psychological Capital Questionnaire Forms ==
Psychological Capital Questionnaire (PCQ): The original and validated form of the PCQ. It can be used as a self-assessment and a multi-rater assessment, meaning that the assessment considers the target individual's self-assessment alongside the assessments from others who rate the target individual's PsyCap.

Psychological Capital Questionnaire Short Form (PCQ Short Form): The PCQ Short Form is a 12-item form of the PCQ. It is only usable as a self-assessment.

== Psychological Capital Questionnaire Scoring ==
All PCQ scales are scored using a 6-point Likert scale. Each scale measures its own unique dimension of PsyCap. An overall PsyCap score is calculated by taking the mean of all the items in the PCQ. Scales include reverse-scored items.

The 6-point Likert scale for all PCQ scales is as follows:

1. Strongly Disagree
2. Disagree
3. Somewhat Disagree
4. Somewhat Agree
5. Agree
6. Strongly Agree
