= 1971 Pulitzer Prize =

Awards for journalism and related fields

The 1971 Pulitzer Prizes are:

== Journalism awards ==
- Public Service:
  - Winston-Salem Journal and Sentinel, for investigation of environmental problems, particularly blocking strip mine operations in northwest North Carolina.
- National Reporting:
  - Lucinda Franks and Thomas Powers of United Press International, for their profile of revolutionary Diana Oughton, "The Making of a Terrorist".
- Local General or Spot News Reporting:
  - Staff of the Akron Beacon Journal, for coverage of the Kent State shootings on May 4, 1970.
- Local Investigative Specialized Reporting:
  - William Jones of the Chicago Tribune, for exposing "collusion between police and some of Chicago's largest ambulance companies to restrict services in low income areas."
- International Reporting:
  - Jimmie Lee Hoagland of The Washington Post, for covering the struggle against apartheid in South Africa.
- Criticism or Commentary:
  - William A. Caldwell of The Record (Hackensack, New Jersey), for his commentary in his daily column, "Simeon Stylites".
  - Harold C. Schonberg of The New York Times, for his music criticism in 1970.
- Editorial Writing:
  - Horace G. Davis, Jr. of The Gainesville Sun, for his editorials in support of peaceful desegregation in Florida schools.
- Editorial Cartooning:
  - Paul Conrad of the Los Angeles Times, for his cartooning in 1970.
- Spot News Photography:
  - John Paul Filo of the Valley Daily News/Daily Dispatch (Tarentum and New Kensington, Pennsylvania), for his photography of the Kent State shootings.
- Feature Photography:
  - Jack Dykinga of the Chicago Sun-Times, for his photography at the Lincoln and Dixon State Schools for the Retarded (Illinois).

== Letters, Drama and Music Awards ==
- Fiction:
  - No award given.
- Drama:
  - The Effect of Gamma Rays on Man-in-the-Moon Marigolds by Paul Zindel (Harper)
- History:
  - Roosevelt: The Soldier of Freedom by James MacGregor Burns (Harcourt)
- Biography or Autobiography:
  - Robert Frost: The Years of Triumph, 1915-1938 by Lawrance Thompson (Holt)
- Poetry:
  - The Carrier of Ladders by William S. Merwin (Atheneum)
- General Nonfiction:
  - The Rising Sun by John Toland (Random)
- Music:
  - Synchronisms No. 6 for Piano and Electronic Sound (1970) by Mario Davidovsky (E. B. Marks)
    Premiered August 19, 1970, at the Berkshire Music Festival.

== Sources ==
- Pulitzer Prizes for 1971
