= Antonakis =

Antonakis is a given name and surname that by Greek naming conventions is a diminutive form of Antonis. It may be derived from the Italian surname Antonacci; the Cretan variant of Antonaki (which had a strong Venetian influence) is pronounced like the Italian Antonacci.

== Given name ==
- Antonakis Andreou (born 1974), Cypriot sports shooter.

== Surname ==
- John Antonakis (born 1969), South African professor of organizational behavior
- Tasos Antonakis (born 1992), Greek basketball player

== See also ==
- Stephen Antonakos
