= Creative leadership =

Creative leadership is a style of leadership based upon the concept of working cooperatively to develop innovative ideas. Those who employ creative leadership tend to do so by creating conditions which promote creativity. Creating such conditions, which are sometimes called "supportive contributions", are described as psychological, material, and/or social supports that trigger, enable, and sustain creative thinking in others.

The term creative leadership is commonly used in organizational studies and was first referenced in 1957. In recent years, there has been a significant increase in research surrounding creative and innovation leadership and the term has also been used increasingly among practitioners and in the public sphere. Researchers and practitioners have suggested that creative leadership is more important in the current political and economic climate than ever before. It has also been suggested that creative leaders display behaviors that may contradict traditional management styles.

In 2010, results from the IBM Global CEO Study indicated that according to the polled Chief executive officers, creativity was the most important quality for leaders to build successful businesses, outranking integrity and global thinking. Further research has found that although organisations may claim that they value creative leadership, the majority of those organisations tend to promote leaders who do not espouse creative leadership, and instead are risk-averse and maintain the status quo.

== Competencies ==
According to Stoll and Temperley (2009, 69–74), creative leaders foster conditions that can help to inspire creativity in others. These conditions include: "stimulating a sense of urgency if necessary, exposing colleagues to new thinking and experiences, providing time and space to facilitate the practicalities; setting high expectations, promoting individual and collaborative creative thinking and design, using failure as a learning opportunity, relinquishing control, and the modelling of creativity and risk-taking."

Ball (2015) suggests that the five core competencies for creative leadership are: "acting with passion and purpose, applying an explorative mindset, envisioning a better future, orchestrating creative teams, and driving breakthrough change." Sohmen's (2015) research argues that good creative leaders consistently develop the following characteristics in themselves: leadership styles and perceptions, understanding of different cultures, individual and team motivations, interpersonal skills, levels of creativity, ability to manage change, communication styles, listening ability, decision-making skills, and, personal ethics.

== Definitions ==
Numerous researchers have used the term creative leadership since it was first used as a concept in the 1950s. The meanings may differ across research contexts.
Views on the definition and scope of creative leadership include:

- "Leading others toward the attainment of a creative outcome"
- "Deliberately engaging one's imagination to define and guide a group toward a novel goal-a direction that is new for the group"
- "An imaginative and thought-through response to opportunities and to challenging issues that inhibit learning at all levels. It is about seeing, thinking and doing things differently in order to improve the life chances of all students. Creative leaders also provide the conditions, environment and opportunities for others to be creative."
- "A creative leader induces others to focus the process and process skills on meeting their challenges. They become consultants or facilitators in the process of solving the challenge rather than giving orders or doing the work themselves. Having transferred ownership, they then help others to achieve their own goals. These creative leadership skills hardly fit with the traditional management style that most organizations employ, but they can be learned."
- "The ability to enable teams to confidently generate ideas with strategic and innovative value."

== Conceptualisations ==
In their meta-theoretical integration of creative leadership research, Mainemelis, Kark, and Epitropaki (2015) identified three different complementary conceptualisations which reflect the different contexts in which creative leadership can be applied: facilitating creativity, directing a creative vision, and integrating diverse creative contributions. Subsequent research has found that creative leadership may be enacted in these different ways depending on the context

=== Facilitating ===
In the context of facilitating, those who employ creative leadership will support employees or individuals as primary creators, influencing their creative contributions and shaping each stage of the creative process. In the context of facilitating, creative leaders lead in a way that increases employees' likelihood of generating new ideas. As facilitators, creative leaders foster others' creativity and may take individuals through a process that helps them generate new ideas, such as brainstorming. In the context of facilitating, those who employ creative leadership are involved in the entire creative process and shape a supportive climate for creativity.

=== Directing ===
In the context of directing, those who employ creative leadership are the primary creators and their vision is enacted through the supportive contributions and collaboration from others. Mumford, Scott, Gadis and Strange (2002) suggest that, in directing, a leader is integral to the production of a creative concept, while others support its implementation. The degree to which others contribute creatively may depend upon the situation. This can be compared to an orchestra conductor, who provides a vision and direction for musicians who bring their own individual contributions. A strong directive creative leader may inspire, elicit, and integrate high-quality contributions from his or her collaborators.

=== Integrating ===
In the context of integrating, there is a focus on the creative leader's ability to integrate or synthesize his or her novel ideas with heterogeneous creative ideas from other individuals. Compared to directing and facilitating contexts, there is a greater balance between the ratio of leader to follower creative contributions and supportive contributions in the integrating context. Each individual can receive credit for their distinct contribution, and successful leadership in this context depends on the leader's ability to synthesise others' creative inputs. Film directors are an example of leaders working in an integrating context, providing guidance to create a feature film that includes creative contributions from numerous people: screenwriters, actors, special effects technicians, costume designers, etc.

== Research on different types of leadership ==
Empirical, meta-analytic, and theoretical studies have been conducted on various types of leadership. Some of the styles of leadership studied include:

- Democratic leadership
- Innovation leadership
- Transactional leadership
- Transformational leadership
- Authentic leadership

== See also ==
- Creativity
- Leadership
- Leadership studies
- Organization development
