= Agentic leadership =

Agentic leadership derives from the term agency. This leadership style is generally found in the business field by a person who is respected by subordinates. This person demonstrates assertiveness, competitiveness, independence, courageousness, and is masterful in achieving their task at hand.

== See also ==
- Group leadership
- Leadership
- Transactional leadership
- Transformational leadership
