= Multifactor Leadership Questionnaire =

Psychology test by Bruce Avolio

The Multifactor Leadership Questionnaire (MLQ) is a psychological inventory consisting of 36 items pertaining to leadership styles and 9 items pertaining to leadership outcomes. The MLQ was constructed by Bruce J. Avolio and Bernard M. Bass with the goal to assess a full range of leadership styles. The MLQ is composed of 9 scales that measure three leadership styles: transformational leadership (5 scales), transactional leadership (2 scales), and passive/avoidant behavior (2 scales), and 3 scales that measure outcomes of leadership. The MLQ takes an average of 15 minutes to complete and can be administered to an individual or group. The MLQ can be used to differentiate effective and ineffective leaders at all organizational levels and has been validated across many cultures and types of organizations. It is used for leadership development and research.

The MLQ is designed as a multi-rater (or 360-degree) instrument, meaning that the leadership assessment considers the leader's self-assessment alongside the assessments of their leadership from their superiors, peers, subordinates, and others. The Leader (Self) Form and the Rater Form of the MLQ can be completed and assessed separately - however validity is much weaker when assessing leadership using only the Leader (Self) Form.

Following the publication of the original MLQ in 1985, new versions of the MLQ were gradually developed to fit different assessment needs. The current versions of the MLQ are: Multifactor Leadership Questionnaire 360 (MLQ 360), Multifactor Leadership Questionnaire Self Form (MLQ Self), Multifactor Leadership Questionnaire Rater Form (MLQ Rater Form), Team Multifactor Leadership Questionnaire (TMLQ), and Multifactor Leadership Questionnaire Actual vs. Ought. All MLQ versions are protected by copyright law and published by Mind Garden, Inc.

The MLQ underwent a re-branding for its scales in 2015 with the justification of replacing the heavily academic scale names with terms that would be more widely and easily understood by those outside of academia, such as business leaders and consultants. Recent academic research using the MLQ continue to use the original scale names.

The MLQ is often combined with the Authentic Leadership Questionnaire (ALQ) to assess the self-awareness, transparency, ethics/morality, and processing ability of leaders (the ALQ was constructed by Avolio with William L. Gardner and Fred O. Walumbwa in 2007).

== Multifactor Leadership Questionnaire Scales ==
=== Transformational Leadership Scales ===
Transformational leadership is measured by 5 scales (20 items). This is the only leadership style measured by the MLQ that allows an overall average score of all subscales, though this overall score has less validity than each of the 5 subscales if interpreted individually. Higher scale scores in these subscales correspond to higher frequency of transformational leadership behaviors.

- Builds Trust (formerly Idealized Influence - Attributes): This 4-item scale measures the frequency in which leaders build trust, inspire power and pride, and go beyond their own individual interests for their followers.
- Acts with Integrity (formerly Idealized Influence - Behaviors): This 4-item scale measures the frequency in which leaders act with integrity, talk about their values and beliefs, focus on a desirable vision, and consider the moral and ethical consequences of their actions.
- Encourages Others (formerly Inspirational Motivation): This 4-item scale measures the frequency in which leaders behave in ways that motivate those around them by providing meaning and challenge to their followers' work.
- Encourages Innovative Thinking (formerly Intellectual Stimulation): This 4-item scale measures the frequency in which leaders stimulate their followers' effort to be innovative and creative by questioning assumptions, reframing problems, and approaching old situations in new ways.
- Coaches & Develops People (formerly Individual Consideration): This 4-item scale measures the frequency in which leaders pay attention to each follower's needs for achievement and growth by acting as a coach or mentor.

=== Transactional Leadership Scales ===
Transactional leadership is measured by 2 scales (8 items). Higher scale scores in these subscales correspond to higher frequency of transactional leadership behaviors.

- Rewards Achievement (formerly Contingent Reward): This 4-item scale measures the frequency in which leaders reward their followers in return for achievement of expected levels of performance.
- Monitors Deviations & Mistakes (formerly Management-by-Exception: Active): This 4-item scale measures the frequency in which leaders monitor for deviations, mistakes, and errors and then take immediate corrective action.

=== Passive/Avoidant Behaviors ===
Passive/Avoidant behavior is measured by 2 scales (8 items). Higher scale scores in these subscales correspond to higher frequency of passive or avoidant behaviors during leadership activities.

- Fights Fires (formerly Management-by-Exception: Passive): This 4-item scale measures the frequency in which leaders wait for a problem to appear before taking corrective action.
- Avoids Involvement (formerly Laissez-Faire): This 4-item scale measures the frequency in which leaders refuse to assume the responsibilities that are a part of their position as leaders.

=== Outcomes of Leadership ===
Outcomes of leadership is measured by 3 scales (9 items) and is only asked to raters (the leader does not answer these questions). Higher scale scores in these subscales correspond to higher frequency of desired outcomes of leadership.

- Generates Extra Effort (formerly Extra Effort): This 3-item scale measures the frequency in which leaders are perceived to be able to influence their followers to do more than they are expected to do.
- Is Productive (formerly Effectiveness): This 4-item scale measures the frequency in which leaders are perceived as being effective when interacting at different levels of the organization.
- Generates Satisfaction (formerly Satisfaction with the Leadership): This 2-item scale measures the frequency in which raters are satisfied with their leader's methods of working with others.

== Multifactor Leadership Questionnaire Forms ==
The MLQ has five forms composed of 36, 45, 50, or 90 items to measure leadership style behaviors.

=== Multifactor Leadership Questionnaire 360 (MLQ 360) ===
The MLQ 360 is composed of two forms: the Leader Form (36 items) and the Rater Form (45 items). It is a multi-rater form, meaning that it analyzes the leader's self-assessment alongside how superiors, peers, subordinates, and others perceive their leadership behaviors. The MLQ 360 measures transformational leadership, transactional leadership, passive/avoidant behaviors, and outcomes of leadership.

=== Multifactor Leadership Questionnaire Rater Form (MLQ Rater Form) ===
The MLQ Rater Form is composed of 45 items and was designed to assess how the leader's superiors, peers, subordinates, and others perceive the leader's leadership behaviors. The MLQ Rater Form measures transformational leadership, transactional leadership, passive/avoidant behaviors, and outcomes of leadership.

=== Multifactor Leadership Questionnaire Self Form (MLQ Self) ===
The MLQ Self is composed of 36 items and was designed to assess how the leader perceives their own leadership behaviors. Psychometrics are not available for the MLQ Self as a stand-alone assessment of leadership styles. The MLQ Self measures transformational leadership, transactional leadership, and passive/avoidant behaviors.

=== Team Multifactor Leadership Questionnaire (TMLQ) ===
The TMLQ is composed of 50 items and is designed for adults who work in a team. It represents an extension of the definition of transformational leadership from the individual to the collective. The TMLQ measures team transformational leadership, team transactional leadership, team passive/avoidant behaviors, and team outcomes of leadership.

=== Multifactor Leadership Questionnaire Actual vs. Ought (MLQ Actual. vs. Ought) ===
The MLQ Actual vs. Ought is composed of two forms: the Actual Form (45 items) and the Ought form (45 items). It is designed to measure how an individual perceives the frequency of the leadership behaviors they exhibit compared to the leadership behaviors they feel they should be exhibiting. The MLQ Actual vs. Ought measures actual transformational leadership, ought transformational leadership, actual transactional leadership, ought transactional leadership, actual passive/avoidant behaviors, ought passive/avoidant behaviors, actual outcomes of leadership, and ought outcomes of leadership.

== Scoring the Multifactor Leadership Questionnaire ==
All MLQ scales are scored using a 5-point scale as follows:

1. Not at all
2. Once in a while
3. Sometimes
4. Fairly often
5. Frequently, if not always
