= Leadership studies =

Multidisciplinary academic field that focuses on leadership in organizational contexts

Leadership studies is a multidisciplinary academic field of study that focuses on leadership in organizational contexts and in human life. Leadership studies has origins in the social sciences (e.g., sociology, anthropology, psychology), in humanities (e.g., history and philosophy), as well as in professional and applied fields of study (e.g., management and education). The field of leadership studies is closely linked to the field of organizational studies.

As an academic area of inquiry, the study of leadership has been of interest to scholars from a wide variety of disciplinary backgrounds. Today, there are numerous academic programs (spanning several academic colleges and departments) related to the study of leadership. Leadership degree programs generally relate to: aspects of leadership, leadership studies, and organizational leadership (although there are a number of leadership-oriented concentrations in other academic areas).

== History of leadership as a field of study ==
The study of leadership can be dated back to Plato, Sun Tzu and Machiavelli. However, leadership has only become the focus of contemporary academic studies in the last 60 years, and particularly more so in the last two decades. Contemporary leadership scholars and researchers have often been questioned about the nature of their work, and its place within the academy, but much of the confusion surrounding leadership as a field of study may be attributed to a lack of understanding regarding transdisciplinary, inter-, and multi- disciplinary academic fields of study in general.

The discipline, which encompasses a host of sub-fields, is filled with definitions, theories, styles, functions, competencies, and historical examples of successful and diverse leaders. Collectively, the research findings on leadership have provided a far more sophisticated and complex view of the phenomenon than most of the simplistic views presented in the popular press.

Some of the earliest studies on leadership include:

- The Ohio State Leadership Studies which began in the 1940s and focused on how leaders could satisfy common group needs. The findings indicated that the two most important dimensions in leadership included: "initiating structure", and "consideration". These characteristics could be either high or low and were independent of one another. The research was based on questionnaires to leaders and subordinates. These questionnaires are known as the Leader Behavior Description Questionnaire (LBDQ) and the Supervisor Behavior Description Questionnaire (SBDQ). By 1962, the LBDQ was on version XII.

- The Michigan Studies of Leadership which began in the 1950s and indicated that leaders could be classified as either "employee centered", or "job centered". These studies identified three critical characteristics of effective leaders: task oriented behavior, relationship-oriented behavior, and participative leadership.

- Theory X and theory Y – developed by Douglas McGregor in the 1960s at MIT Sloan School of Management. These theories described employee motivation in the workforce. Both theories begin with the premise that the role of management is to assemble the factors of production, including people, for the economic benefit of the firm. Beyond this point, the two theories of management diverge.

- Managerial grid model (1964), updated in 1991 to the Blake and McCanse leadership grid – developed the orientation of "task orientation" and "people orientation" in leader behavior. They developed the leadership grid which focused on concern for results (on the one axis) and concern for people (on the other axis).

In addition to these studies, leadership has been examined from an academic perspective through several theoretical lenses:

- Trait and behavioral theories of leadership: Attempt to describe the types of behavior and personality tendencies associated with effective leadership.

- Situational and contingency theories of leadership: Incorporate environmental and situational considerations into leader behavior.

- Functional leadership theory: Suggests that a leader's primary responsibility is to see that whatever is necessary in relation to group needs is taken care of.

- Information-processing leadership theory: Focuses on the role of social perception in identifying leadership abilities.

- Self-leadership theory: Although behaviorally oriented, the essence of self leadership theory is that behaviors are directed toward the attainment of super-ordinate goals.

- Transactional and transformational theories of leadership: The transactional leader focuses on managerial reward and contingent valuation. The transformational leader focuses on motivation and goal attainment.

The first doctoral program in Leadership Studies was established at the University of San Diego in the School of Leadership and Education Sciences in 1979. The first undergraduate school of Leadership Studies was established at the University of Richmond Jepson School of Leadership Studies in 1992.

== Research on different types of leadership ==
Empirical, meta-analytic, and theoretical studies have been conducted on various types of leadership. Some of the styles of leadership studied include:

- Ambidextrous leadership
- Democratic leadership
- Innovation leadership
- Transactional leadership
- Transformational leadership

== Notable leadership scholars ==
- John Antonakis: Swiss social scientist and former editor in chief of The Leadership Quarterly, is a pioneer in promoting causal identification in leadership (and management studies), in promoting consequential experimental designs and natural experiments, and in making fundamental contributions to the science of leadership (e.g., charismatic leadership, individual differences, social cognition). He is professor at HEC Lausanne at the University of Lausanne.
- Warren Bennis: American scholar, organizational consultant and author, widely regarded as a pioneer of the contemporary field of Leadership Studies. Bennis is University Professor and Distinguished Professor of Business Administration and Founding Chairman of The Leadership Institute at the University of Southern California.
- Stephen R. Covey: An international respected leadership authority, author of Principle Centered Leadership, Seven Habits of Highly Effective People, and The 8th Habit. Founder and vice chairman of FranklinCovey Company.
- James MacGregor Burns: Presidential biographer, founder of leadership studies with his 1978 book Leadership, Woodrow Wilson Professor (emeritus) of Political Science at Williams College, and scholar at the James MacGregor Burns Academy of Leadership at the University of Maryland, College Park. He received a Pulitzer Prize and National Book Award in 1971 for his Roosevelt: The Soldier of Freedom 1940–1945.
- Peter Drucker: Writer, management consultant, and self-described "social ecologist". Widely considered to be the father of "modern management", his 39 books and countless scholarly and popular articles explored how humans are organized across all sectors of society—in business, government and the nonprofit world.
- Ronald Heifetz: Co-founder of the Center for Public Leadership and King Hussein bin Talal Lecturer in Public Leadership at Harvard University's John F. Kennedy School of Government.
- Barry Z. Posner: Dean of the Leavey School of Business as well as a Professor of Leadership at Santa Clara University.
- Victor Vroom: Business school professor at the Yale School of Management. Vroom's primary research was on the expectancy theory of motivation, which attempts to explain why individuals choose to follow certain courses of action in organizations, particularly in decision-making and leadership. His most well-known books are Work and Motivation, Leadership and Decision Making, and The New Leadership. Vroom has also been a consultant to a number of corporations such as GE and American Express.

== Research methods in the study of leadership ==
Leadership has been studied using quantitative, qualitative, and mixed methods (a combination of quantitative and qualitative) research methodologies. From a quantitative psychology orientation, statistical and mathematical modeling has been used in the development of leadership scales, in testing established leader evaluation tools, and in examining perceptions of leaders. Quantitative analysis may also take an experimental approach, incorporating methods from the field of experimental economics. Survey methodology has also been widely used in leadership research. As such, traditional methods of analysis in survey research have also extended to the analysis of survey research within the study of leadership (e.g., cross-tabulations, ANOVAs, regression analysis, log-linear analysis, factor analysis, etc.). From a qualitative orientation, leadership research has included ethnography, historiography, and literary criticism.

== Academic programs ==
There are a considerable number of doctoral, masters, and undergraduate degree programs related to the study of leadership. Given that the study of leadership is interdisciplinary, leadership-related degree programs are often situated within various colleges, schools, and departments across different university campuses (e.g., Schools of Education at some universities, Business Schools at other universities, and Graduate and Professional Schools at still other universities). As such, at the doctoral level leadership related degree programs primarily include: Ph.D., Ed.D., and executive doctoral degrees (depending on the situation of the program within the university). At the masters level leadership related degree programs primarily include: Master of Science, Master of Arts, and executive master's degrees. At the undergraduate level leadership related degree programs primarily include: Bachelor of Science and Bachelor of Arts degrees as well as leadership certificate and minor programs. For example, Old Dominion University offers an undergraduate Bachelor of Science degree in Interdisciplinary Studies – Leadership]. Old Dominion University also offers a LeADERS program for undergraduates that help students foster leadership skills and values to ultimately be competitive in a student's career.

== See also ==
- Industrial and organizational psychology
- Leadership
- Leadership (journal)
- National School of Leadership
- Organizational studies
