= Innovation leadership =

Philosophy and technique

Innovation leadership is a philosophy and technique that combines different leadership styles to influence employees to produce creative ideas, products, and services. The key role in the practice of innovation leadership is the innovation leader. Dr. David Gliddon (2006) developed the competency model of innovation leaders and established the concept of innovation leadership at Penn State University.

As an approach to organization development, innovation leadership can support achievement of the mission or the vision of an organization or group. With new technologies and processes, it is necessary for organizations to think innovatively to ensure continued success and stay competitive. to adapt to new changes, “The need for innovation in organizations has resulted in a new focus on the role of leaders in shaping the nature and success of creative efforts.” Without innovation leadership, organizations are likely to struggle. This new call for innovation represents the shift from the 20th century, traditional view of organizational practices, which discouraged employee innovative behaviors, to the 21st-century view of valuing innovative thinking as a “potentially powerful influence on organizational performance.”

== Overview ==
To have a clear understanding of what innovation leadership involves, one must first understand the concept of innovation. Although there is some controversy over how it can be defined, through general consensus in the literature, it can be described as novel ideas of viable products that are put into operation. It includes three different stages, which are all dynamic and iterative (constant):

1. Idea Generation
2. Evaluation
3. Implementation

The two types of innovation include exploratory innovation, which involves generating brand new ideas, and value-added innovation, which involves modifying and improving ideas that already exist. Ideas generated must be useful to be considered innovative. Innovation should also not be confused with creativity, which is merely the generation of a novel idea that may not necessarily be put into operation—though these words are sometimes used interchangeably in research literature when speaking about innovation leadership. Innovation leadership is a complex concept, as there is no single explanation or formula for a leader to follow to increase innovation. As a result, innovation leadership encompasses a variety of different activities, actions, and behaviors that interact to produce an innovative outcome.

=== Value-added innovation ===
Exploratory and value-added innovation require different leadership styles and behaviors to succeed. Value-added innovation (PwC, 2010) involves refining and revising an existing product or service and typically requires minimal risk taking (compared to exploratory innovation, which often involves taking a large risk); in this case, it is most appropriate for a leader for innovation to adopt a transactional form of leadership. This is because a transactional leadership style does not use open leadership behaviors such as encouraging employees to experiment and take risks, but rather uses closed leadership behaviors that do not condone or reward risk-taking. Companies whose innovation leaders use transactional leadership for value-added innovation purposes include Toyota Motor Co., General Motors Corp., and Ford Motor Co.; examples of these companies’ value-added innovations such as making improvements on existing cars by making them faster, more comfortable, and getting better gas mileage.

Occasionally a value-added innovation may require a completely new way of thinking and possibly taking new risks. An example of this scenario can be illustrated through Aspirin; this was an existing product, traditionally used as an analgesic to alleviate aches and pains, but has been introduced into a new and different market by extending its uses to help prevent heart attack and reduce blood clot formation. In this example, the usage of an existing product was re-worked and introduced into a new market. While an existing product is being changed and/or improved upon, characterizing it as a value-added innovation, outside-the-box thinking, research, and risk-taking are now required since it is being introduced into a new market. In this case, a transformational leadership style is a more appropriate style to use.

The innovation leader must gauge whether, and to what extent, risk and radical thinking are involved in value-added innovation to determine which leadership style to use in a given situation. The leader must be flexible and able to switch leadership behaviors when necessary.

=== Exploratory innovation ===
Exploratory innovation refers to the generation of novel ideas, strategies, and solutions through the use of strictly open behaviors exhibited most often by transformational leaders. The foundation of exploratory innovation is characterized by search, discovery, experimentation, and risk taking. It is the organization's focus on generating new ideas, products and strategies; in contrast to exploitative innovation, which focuses on building and extending already existing ideas. Some studies have shown that explorative and exploitative innovation require different structures, strategies, processes, capabilities, and cultures. See Innovative Organizational Climate/Culture. Exploratory innovation requires flexibility, opportunism, adaptability, and for leaders to provide intellectual stimulation to their subordinates. In this approach to innovation, the leadership style that is primarily used is transformational. The behaviors exhibited are believed to achieve the desired creative outcome from employees through the application of individualized consideration, charisma, and inspirational motivation.

For example, in one study of the innovation practices at AXA Insurance in Ireland, the CEO John O’Neil engaged in transformational leadership behaviors and introduced the “MadHouse” program that combined workers from different departments and levels of the organization to work together in a creative way. The result of this experiment after six months was 150 new business ideas for products and services. Explorative and Value-added innovation are often referenced together, but surprisingly little research shows an interaction between the two. However, there is an understanding that in some circumstances a ‘balance’ must be attained to achieve superior employee performance. For example, not all novel ideas are implemented, and may be resurrected later. The organization may need to switch gears and adopt exploitative strategies to revise and refine the idea to match present needs.

== Foundations ==
Innovation leadership has roots in path-goal theory and leader-member exchange theory. Certain elements within an organization are also needed for innovation leadership to succeed. Wolfe (1994), as cited by Sarros, Cooper, & Santora, (2008) has pointed out that one antecedent factor for innovation is organizational culture. Likewise, Isaksen, Laver, Ekvail & Britz (2001) concur that innovative endeavors fail without a supportive climate. This antecedent of a supportive organizational culture/climate encompasses encouragement of creativity, autonomy, resources, and pressures. Additional foundational elements for innovation leadership include creative work, a creative workforce, and certain leader attributes.

=== Roots in path-goal theory ===
The basis of path-goal theory uses a similar view of leadership, in that it advocates different types of leadership (e.g., participative, supportive) behaviors, much like innovation leadership does. However, it is contingent on employee and environmental factor to be effective. The idea of a single leader using different leadership behaviors originated in path-goal theory, and has been associated with the framework underlying innovation leadership, which also allows the creation of a work environment conducive to innovative thinking—which is the cognitive process of generating novel and useful ideas.

Creating this type of work environment through innovation leadership involves open leadership behaviors that resemble some leader behaviors proposed by Path-goal theory—for example, upward influence and supportive/considerate behaviors. In innovation leadership, these behaviors encourage the creative team to generate as many novel ideas as possible and lead to evaluation and implementation of these ideas.

=== Roots in leader-member exchange theory ===
Leader-member exchange theory (LMX theory) is another one of the building blocks of innovation leadership. It follows the same idea as Path-goal theory and innovation leadership, that multiple leadership styles are necessary in managing multiple subordinates but takes it a step further. LMX involves adopting a unique leadership style for each employee. Past studies indicate that LMX theory has been shown to have an effect on innovation. Studies have also shown that leader-member exchange relationships can predict significant organizational and attitudinal variables including higher job satisfaction and higher job performance.

Basu and Green (1997) found that innovative behavior is related to the quality of the leader-member exchange where high quality exchanges include contributions from both the leader and the follower. However, in a study by Jean Lee (2008), only the loyalty aspect of LMX (LMXL) was shown to be related to innovativeness. Leadership styles, transformational (positively related) and transactional (negatively related), were found to have an effect on innovativeness.

=== Innovative organizational culture/climate ===
Some studies have shown evidence of organizational culture as the mediator of the relationship between transformational leadership and organizational innovation and performance. In other words, for transformational leadership to affect organizational innovation, an organization must have a strong innovative culture in addition to a leader with a transformational leadership style.

Organizational culture refers to an organization's deep structure, normative beliefs, and shared behavioral expectations. This culture is fairly constant and can influence interorganizational relations. Climate refers to the way that individuals perceive the extent to which the organizational culture impacts them. The two essentially are interrelated. One proposed model for assessing a creative environment in organizations includes the following dimensions:

==== Encouragement of creativity ====
Encouragement of creativity is the most frequently mentioned dimension in the literature. It operates at three major levels, with each level containing multiple aspects.

Conceptual Model Underlying Assessment of Perceptions of the Work Environment for Creativity

==== Organizational encouragement ====
The first level is Organizational Encouragement. This involves encouragement of risk-taking and idea generation from all levels of management, fair and supportive evaluation of new ideas, recognition and reward of creativity, and collaborative idea flow across an organization. Each of these are equally important aspects of organizational encouragement but the third aspect, recognition and reward of creativity, may have adverse effects if the sole purpose for engaging in an activity is to gain reward.

==== Supervisory encouragement ====
The second level, Supervisory Encouragement, highlights the roles of supervisors and project managers in goal clarity, open interaction between supervisors and subordinates, and supervisory support of a team's work and ideas. This level of encouragement points to the concepts of transformational leadership and LMX that emphasise the importance of the interactions of supervisors and subordinates in innovative performance.

==== Work group encouragement ====
The third level of encouragement is Work Group Encouragement. Diversity in team members’ backgrounds and openness to ideas affects creativity because individuals are exposed to a variety of novel and unusual ideas and such exposure had been demonstrated to have a positive effect on creative thinking

==== Autonomy ====
Autonomy is believed to foster creativity since studies have revealed that individuals produce more creative work and experience increased intrinsic motivation when they have a sense of control and ownership over their work and ideas and they perceive themselves as having a choice in how their goals are accomplished, whether those goals are given to them by their supervisor or chosen by themselves.

==== Resources ====
Resources have been suggested to be directly related to creativity in organizations. Individuals’ perceptions of the availability of resources may lead to increased beliefs of the likelihood that the ideas they generate have a possibility of reaching the implementation stage.

==== Pressures ====
The little evidence that exists on the dimension of pressure suggests somewhat paradoxical influences. Some degree of pressure could have a positive effect if the pressure originates from the challenging and intellectual nature of the task itself, increasing intrinsic motivation. However, if the pressure experienced is perceived extreme it could counteract creativity. Amabile et al. (1996) identify two forms of pressure: excessive workload pressure and challenge. They suggest that the first should have a negative influence on creativity while the second should have a positive one.

==== Organizational impediments to creativity ====
Although there has been little research on the work of environment factors that undermine creativity, some research suggests that these impediments include internal strife, conservatism, and rigid, formal management structures within organizations. This dimension is seen as working against autonomy and tends to have an inverse effect as individuals may perceive a more controlling environment.

=== Creative work ===
Creative work can occur at any job but more specifically it can occur in jobs where there are complicated, ill-defined problems requiring innovative solutions. The fact that the creative problems are ill-defined makes the creative work uncertain, and it may involve risky efforts. It is also resource intensive, demanding, and time consuming work requiring high levels of motivation and often requires collaboration. This type of work must also involve both novel idea generation and novel idea implementation and requires expertise on the part of the workforce.

=== Creative workforce ===
A creative workforce is needed for innovation leadership to be successful. Creative people have expertise on the subject requiring innovation and tend to use work as a source of identity. Because of this, they are powerfully intrinsically motivated by professional achievement opportunities and recognition. Creative workers are also commonly characterized as highly valuing their autonomy; additional dispositional attributes include openness, flexibility, cognitive complexity, self-confidence, dominance, and introversion. The patterns of characteristics creative workers exhibit typically allow them to confidently explore alternative ideas under ambiguous conditions.

=== Leader attributes/characteristics ===
Successful innovation leadership requires a leader with certain characteristics. These include expertise in the domain, creativity, ability to carry out transformational leadership behaviors, planning and sense-making, and social skills. Innovative leaders can be recruited and hired through professional networks and referrals or alternatively found through succession planning, which involves identifying innovative leaders who are already working within the organization.

== Types of innovation leadership styles ==
In addition to these foundations, various styles play an important role in innovation leadership, each of which are used at different stages of the innovation process or for different types of innovation (value-added vs. exploratory). Frequently associated leadership styles include transformational leadership, transactional leadership, and ambidextrous leadership. The type of leadership most strongly associated with innovation is transformational leadership.

== Key activities ==
=== Idea generation ===
As mentioned above, different leadership styles and behaviors may be more appropriate at different stages of the innovation process. Current research supports the notion that in the idea generation process, innovation leadership requires a leader to use a more transformational style of leadership. During this stage, a leader needs to promote a safe environment for employees/team members to voice novel ideas and original thinking as well as provide workers with the resources to do so effectively. Research has also found that leaders who engage in unconventional behaviors, associated with transformational leadership, were seen as stronger role models and, as a result, increase creative performance in their subordinates. For example, the founders of Google have been known to wear capes and jump-shoes around the office, thus inspiring more outside-the-box thinking in their employees. These open leadership behaviors convey that unorthodox and unconventional ideas and behaviors are not only accepted but also encouraged.

=== Idea evaluation and implementation ===
In addition to providing a climate for idea generation, innovation leadership also requires leaders to ensure that the process of idea generation does not overshadow the evaluation and implementation processes. During these phases of leadership, leaders must support some ideas while discarding other ideas and put the supported ideas into production. The role of the leader must shift away from a transformational style to a more transactional style of leadership, which involves being more direct and critical toward the ideas generated. A leader now needs to ensure that constructive discussions of innovative ideas are taking place among their subordinates. This serves to evaluate the usefulness of each idea, eliminate those that do not appear viable to the organization or goal, and push the ones that do appear viable into the production phase. The leader must adopt what are known as closed leadership behaviors to achieve this. Instead of stimulating idea generation, the leader must shift focus from generating new ideas toward fine-tuning existing ideas to achieve progress toward the goal, and ultimately implement the idea. This challenge of balancing differing leadership styles when appropriate is called the generator evaluator paradox. It is important to consider the role of ambidextrous leadership, since a leader must be able to switch between leadership roles and styles when necessary to successfully lead for innovation. Paradoxes of innovation leadership are discussed below.

== Innovation leadership and influence ==
Depending on the type of leadership style that is adopted by the innovation leader, the leader may have either a direct or indirect influence on your employees.

=== Direct influences ===
Direct forms of influence in leading innovation include:

- Providing creative input and idea suggestion to employees
- Providing employees with clear and concrete goals
- Allocating organizational resources (i.e. research and development spending; manpower) for implementing ideas

=== Indirect influences ===
Indirect influences get the same results without providing explicit guidance to employees. These types of influences include:

- Establishing a supportive climate for creativity within the organization
- Acting as a role model for innovative thinking
- Providing employees with rewards and recognition for innovative thinking
- Hiring and team composition (i.e. putting together teams with specific skill sets needed for innovative thinking, or hiring employees with creative personalities without planning what they work on).

== Proposed model ==
A proposed model for innovation leadership has been a multilevel process model of innovation, which uses the direct and indirect leadership on the processes of innovation mentioned in the above section to promote the innovation process. In the model, indirect leadership influences affect the individual creativity (generation phase) and team creativity (evaluation phase) process. Direct leadership influences affect the team creativity (evaluation phase) process and the organizational innovation process (implementation phase). The individual creativity (generation phase) box in the model represents the process of the individual generating the initial idea or ideas and proposing them to their team. The team creativity (evaluation phase) box represents the process of the team taking that idea, making alterations and fine-tuning it to the point of making prototypes, formalized sketches, or simulations. The organizational innovation (implementation) box represents taking those prototypes, sketches, or simulations and testing, evaluating, and possibly mass-producing them.

Figure 1. Model of direct and indirect leadership influences on the process of innovation

Two very important key features of this model should be mentioned:

1. The three stages of innovation (idea generation, evaluation, and implementation) are not independent of one another.
2. The stages in the model should not be viewed in a “lock-step fashion,” meaning that there are both backward and forward influences and activities affecting each of the three stages. For example, ideas are generated, discussed, and tested only to feed information back into the system, starting the process from the beginning again. The forward and backward arrows between individual creativity and team creativity, the forward and backward arrows between team creativity and organizational innovation, as well as the arrow from organizational innovation to individual creativity visually represent this key feature.

== Paradoxes ==
Innovation leadership is complex, as can be seen from the Hunter & Cushenbery (2011) model, and often paradoxes emerge that require leaders to strike a delicate balance between two conflicting roles (e.g. encouraging innovative ideas vs. limiting innovative ideas to include only those that are most viable and useful to the organization). A balance must be struck, not only within the leader and their behaviors, but between conflicting interests of involved parties as well. These include conflicting interests between the leader and the employees/teams, between leaders and situational/contextual factors, and between the employees/teams and the organization. Critical potential paradoxes that are often faced by leaders of innovation have been provided by Hunter, Thoroughgood, Meyer, & Ligon (2011).

=== Internal/localized paradox ===
Internal/Localized paradoxes entail conflicting roles experienced within the leader.

=== Dual expertise paradox ===
The Dual Expertise Paradox postulates that a leader must have or acquire domain expertise while at the same time obtaining the necessary leadership skills to manage his/her employees and resources.

=== Generation evaluation paradox ===
The Generation Evaluation Paradox stipulates that a leader must encourage a supportive climate for the generation of new ideas and thinking outside-the-box while evaluating these ideas and realizing that not all creative ideas are useful and many may even fail (while not being too critical and negative of those ideas).

=== Team-level paradox ===
Team-level paradoxes entail conflicting interests between the leader and the employees/teams

=== Creative personality cohesion paradox ===
Creative Personality Cohesion Paradox is based on the research finding that creative workers generally highly value autonomy and, as a result, often prefer to work alone. This paradox illustrates the difficulty leaders have in providing their employees with the autonomy they must be creative, while fostering team cohesion (or closeness) to facilitate idea sharing. A leader must also be careful not to encourage too much cohesion, as it may discourage group members from disagreeing (even constructively disagreeing) with fellow group members in an effort not to offend them or “rock the boat.”

=== Vision autonomy paradox ===
The Vision Autonomy Paradox highlights the dilemma a leader faces between providing structure and guidance to a team with respect to the vision of the goal, while at the same time stepping back and providing the team with enough autonomy, especially considering the fact that creative workers highly value autonomy. When leading for innovation, providing an overabundance of structure may result in a backlash from employees who feel their autonomy is being taken away from them.

=== Restriction freedom paradox ===
The Restriction Freedom Paradox underscores that innovation leaders need to allow employees enough time to develop creative endeavors and provide the resources to do so. At the same time the leader must take care to provide enough pressure that they are still motivated to complete the task and not provide too many resources that it has a “deadening effect” on creativity.

=== Situational paradox ===
Situational Paradoxes entail conflicting interests between leaders and the situations they face.

=== Intrinsic extrinsic paradox ===
The Intrinsic Extrinsic Paradox holds that instead of providing more readily available extrinsic motivation tools such as bonuses and salary increases, leaders must provide intrinsic motivation, which generally comes from within the employee, to their employees. This paradox is based on findings that intrinsic motivation is a key factor in facilitating creativity and extrinsic motivators may either hinder creativity or have an unclear relationship with creativity.

=== Local long-term paradox ===
The Local Long-Term Paradox posits that leaders of innovation must maintain their innovative edge by keeping an eye out for and capitalizing on potential opportunities, even at the risk of placing those ideas above or even eliminating ideas that he or she had previously inspired in their teams. The leader must also be capable of developing teams that are flexible enough to be passionate about ideas that may have replaced their own idea that was facilitated, inspired, and supported by their leader. This is where the paradox is most clearly visible.

=== Competition collaboration paradox ===
The competition collaboration paradox involves a leader developing open external relationships with other organizations to discover potential innovation opportunities, while ensuring the organization's emerging ideas are protected in a competitive environment.

=== Feedback rigidity paradox ===
The feedback rigidity paradox involves leaders seeking out and using customer and client advice and feedback towards innovative endeavors to a certain extent, while maintaining control of the vision and not letting the feedback dictate to them—as clients and customers often criticize innovations early on.

=== Failure success paradox ===
The Failure Success Paradox is the idea that innovation leaders must ensure a safe organizational culture that is willing to embrace risk and failure, while at the same time making sure that the organization is also producing successful products and services despite embracing risk and errors.

=== Additional paradoxes ===
Additional paradoxes identified by Hunter et al. (2011) that do not directly involve the leader but are worth mentioning are the paradoxes that occur between teams and the organization. These include the Insularity Cohesion paradox, the Champion Evaluator paradox, and the Creativity Cost paradox.

== Outcomes ==
Outcomes of innovation leadership include inspiring employees to the create and implement novel ideas for products, services, and technologies. In addition, these novel ideas can also be used to solve problems within an organization. What this illustrates is that innovation spurred by innovation leadership can be translated across various industries and can be used for a multitude of purposes. Ultimately, inspiring and initiating organizational innovation through innovation leadership can serve to advance the organization it to the next level.

== Real-world examples ==
Companies that use innovative leadership include 3M, which lets employees work on a project of their choosing for 15% of their time.

Similarly, Google allows employees one day a week to work on their own project.

Zappos employees are allowed to “radically” decorate their cubicle and are encouraged to laugh and have fun at work, including through impromptu in-office parades.

The Young Innovation Leaders Fellowship is a program now dedicated to training young professionals from organizations on how to become innovation leaders.

== See also ==
- Innovation
- Leadership
- Leadership studies
- Organization development
