= King Kendall =

Jason "King" Kendall
- Occupations: Product manager, musician, video game producer

Jason "King" Kendall is an American musician, product manager and videogame producer associated with three bands from Providence, Rhode Island. An online zine published by Harmonix Music Systems (a Cambridge, Massachusetts-based company located about an hour from Providence) refers to Kendall as a "local legend."

== Early career ==
Kendall was a member of the Amazing Royal Crowns rockabilly band that began in Providence in 1993. They won the 1997 WBCN Rock & Roll Rumble in Boston and won four 1998 Kahlua Boston Music Awards (Rising Star, Debut Album of the Year, Video of the Year and Outstanding Club Band). The band toured extensively on their own and with other bands such as the Mighty Mighty Bosstones, The Cramps, Reverend Horton Heat, and were interviewed by Rolling Stone. The Amazing Royal Crowns song, "Mr. Fix-it" is featured as a playable track in the videogame Guitar Hero II.

After the Amazing Royal Crowns called it quits Kendall formed the Deterrents. The Deterrents never released anything formally, only putting out 3 demos on their now defunct web site.

== Recent career ==
As of 2009, Kendall was a member of Megasus, a heavy metal supergroup which started in Providence in as a side project formed by ex-members of Amazing Royal Crowns. In 2006, Kendall was joined Ryan Lesser (from the band Laurels), Paul Lyons (from the band Scared Stiffs), and Dare Matheson (from the band Made In Mexico) to record the song "Red Lottery" for the PlayStation 2 game Guitar Hero II. After this initial recording, Matheson was replaced by Brian Gibson (from the band Lightning Bolt) and their music has appeared on subsequent Harmonix games. Early demos of Guitar Hero II used "King Kendall" as the name for the character who eventually became Eddie Knox. Rock Band 2 features Jason "King" Kendall as an in-game band manager.

In 2012, Jason Kendall and the Amazing Royal Crowns agreed to reunite at the request of their longtime tour-mates and friends, The Mighty Mighty Bosstones. They were guests of the Bosstones annual Hometown Throwdown and played an intense set to their fans at the House of Blues in Boston, MA New Year's Eve Dec 31, 2012.

== Film role ==
In 2005, Kendall appeared in the role of "Kentucky Bob" in the film Die You Zombie Bastards!

== Interviews ==
- Still Royal to the Loyal: An Interview with Jason "King" Kendall of The Amazing Crowns
- Royal Crowns – An interview with Jason "King" Kendall, vocals
