= Multifactor =

Multifactor or multi-factor may refer to:

- Multi-factor authentication
- Multifactor design of experiments software
- Multifactor dimensionality reduction
- Multifactor Leadership Questionnaire
- Multifactor productivity
