= Megasus =

American heavy metal band

Background information
- Origin: Providence, Rhode Island, U.S.
- Genres: Heavy metal, doom metal, noise rock
- Years active: 2006–present
- Label: 20 Buck Spin
- Members: Ryan Lesser; Brian Gibson; Jason Kendall; Paul Lyons
- Past members: Dare Matheson
- Website: http://www.myspace.com/wildpower

Megasus is an American heavy metal band formed in Providence, Rhode Island, United States, in 2006.

== General info and history ==
Megasus is a heavy metal band, formed by members of Lightning Bolt and Loon, and ex-members of Amazing Royal Crowns and Laurels. In mid-2006, Ryan Lesser (Laurels), Jason "King" Kendall (Amazing Royal Crowns) and Paul Lyons (Loon) invited Dare Matheson from Made In Mexico to play drums for a recording of "Red Lottery" as a submission for the PlayStation 2 game Guitar Hero II. After recording "Red Lottery", Megasus lost Matheson and gained Lightning Bolt bassist Brian Gibson as the new full-time drummer.

In 2009, Megasus released their first full-length LP entitled Megasus and included the album's title track as a downloadable song (DLC) in the video game series Rock Band.

Members of Megasus are employees at Harmonix, creators of the Rock Band games as well as Guitar Hero and Guitar Hero II

== Sound ==
The group's sound is as much influenced by heavy metal acts such as Electric Wizard and Black Sabbath as it is by other Providence noise bands. The band's sound is driven by haphazard, non-traditional drumming and ultra-low, detuned, fuzzed guitar and bass.

== Discography ==
=== Singles ===
- "Seven Inches of Sorcery" (2008)

=== Albums ===
- Megasus (2009)
- Menace Of The Universe (2011)
