= Juan Madera =

American organizational psychologist

Juan M. Madera
- Born: United States

Academic background
- Education: B.A., Psychology; M.A., Industrial and Organizational Psychology; Ph.D., Industrial and Organizational Psychology
- Alma mater: California State University, Dominguez Hills; Rice University

Juan M. Madera is an American organizational psychologist and an academic. He is the Curtis L. Carlson Endowed Professor Chair at the University of Houston.

Madera's research spans a broad spectrum of topics within organizational and industrial psychology, focusing on workplace dynamics, diversity, and human resource practices. His research has been published in academic journals, including the Journal of Applied Psychology and The Leadership Quarterly.

== Education ==
Madera earned a B.A. in Psychology from California State University, Dominguez Hills in 2002. He then completed an M.A. and Ph.D. in Organizational Psychology at Rice University in 2005 and 2008, respectively.

== Career ==
Madera began his academic career at the Conrad N. Hilton College of Global Hospitality Leadership at the University of Houston. He served as an assistant professor from 2008 to 2014 and as an associate professor from 2014 to 2020. Since 2020, he has been a professor and, since 2021, the Curtis L. Carlson Endowed Professor Chair. Since 2020, he has held a courtesy joint appointment in the Department of Management & Leadership at the Bauer College of Business, University of Houston. He was recognized as a fellow of the Society for Industrial and Organizational Psychology (SIOP) in 2020.

== Research ==
Madera's early work investigated the role of stereotypes in hiring decisions. A 2006 study explored how race-typed names and occupational stereotypes influence résumé evaluations, finding that racial bias affected perceptions of candidates' qualifications and suitability for high-status positions. In his examination of the role of gender stereotypes in explaining occupational sex segregation, his 2024 paper revealed that women used more communal language than men in self-descriptions in applicant materials for hospitality industry leadership positions, but agentic characteristics were strongly associated with leadership in respondent descriptions of successful leaders in the industry. In another series of studies, he found that women use more communal language than men do when writing about themselves on their resumes, regardless of the type of occupation. In addition, for female applicants (but not male applicants), high communal language was associated with lower perceptions of leadership ability and hireability for prototypically masculine-typed jobs.

While examining the evolving role of technology in recruitment, Madera's 2012 study found that using social networking websites as selection tools was perceived as less fair and reduced applicants' interest in pursuing jobs. This research provided insights into balancing technological adoption with fairness perceptions in recruitment. His work in strategic human resource management (HRM) within the hospitality and tourism sectors was exemplified by a 2017 review, which analyzed the link between HRM practices and organizational performance. The review identified key research trends and gaps, emphasizing the role of frontline managers in HRM implementation.

Madera also explored the effects of remote work during the COVID-19 pandemic. His 2022 study revealed that while productivity often increased with remote work, perceived meaning in daily life declined, and health challenges were exacerbated. His 2023 systematic review, focused on disability employment in the hospitality industry. This work highlighted barriers, facilitators, and the benefits of employing individuals with disabilities, while identifying research gaps, including the need for greater theoretical and methodological rigor.

Madera's research has also focused on selection and promotion issues in academic contexts. In his examination of gender biases in academia, his 2009 paper revealed that letters of recommendation for women emphasized communal traits over agentic ones, traits that negatively influenced hiring decisions. This work underscored the persistent gendered barriers in academic hiring processes. His 2024 paper on the use of external letters of evaluations for promotion and tenure (P&T) candidates found that the linguistic features of the letters reflect the writer more so than P&T candidate performance indicators, challenging the presumed objectivity of external reviews. Moreover, in another study of the P&T process, he and colleagues found that P&T votes can be influenced by candidate characteristics such as their race and gender.

== Awards and honors ==
- 2018 – Conrad N. Hilton College Donald Greenway Excellence Award, University of Houston
- 2020 – Excellence in Research, Scholarship and Creative Activity, University of Houston
- 2024 – Outstanding Academic Research Award, Travel Unity
- 2024 – Conrad N. Hilton College Dean’s Award for Service, University of Houston
- 2025 – Raymond A. Katzell Public Impact Award, SIOP

== Bibliography ==
=== Books ===
- The Routledge Handbook of Diversity, Equity, and Inclusion Management in the Hospitality Industry (2024) ISBN 9781032259253

== Selected articles ==
- Currall, S. C., King, E. B., Lane, N., Madera, J., & Turner, S. (2006). What drives public acceptance of nanotechnology?. Nature nanotechnology, 1(3), 153-155.
- Madera, J. M., & Smith, D. B. (2009). The effects of leader negative emotions on evaluations of leadership in a crisis situation: The role of anger and sadness. The Leadership Quarterly, 20(2), 103-114.
- Madera, J. M., Hebl, M. R., & Martin, R. C. (2009). Gender and letters of recommendation for academia: agentic and communal differences. Journal of Applied Psychology, 94(6), 1591.
- Madera, J. M., Dawson, M., Guchait, P., & Belarmino, A. M. (2017). Strategic human resources management research in hospitality and tourism: A review of current literature and suggestions for the future. International journal of contemporary hospitality management, 29(1), 48-67.
