= Yil =

Yil or YIL could refer to:

- Yil language, a language spoken in Papua New Guinea
- Wagaya language, an extinct language formerly spoken in Queensland, Australia, ISO 639 code [YIL]
- Yahoo! Internet Life, a magazine from 1996 to 2002
- Young Innovation Leaders Fellowship, a fellowship for people from Nigeria or Ghana
