= Collaboration vouchers =

Novel policy that directly funds in person collaboration in local communities

Collaboration vouchers (CoVr) is a proposed policy mechanism in which eligible residents receive annual vouchers to be spent on joining registered community groups. The concept was first published in 2018 by Heslop et al. as a policy to increase population wellbeing through sustained participation in egalitarian, purposive groups. Limited voucher-based participation schemes exist for children's sport in Australia and for youth recreation in Iceland.

== Background ==
The primary intention of CoVr is to build social capital through people forming meaningful in-person relationships amid constructive activities. The proposal draws on evidence that social isolation and loneliness are associated with increased demand for mental health services, higher rates of chronic illness, and lower economic participation. The proposal has been compared with a universal basic income (UBI) and universal basic services (UBS). CoVr is estimated at 10% the cost of a typical UBI, and is not intended to provide for living expenses but to address poverty through providing agency channelled through meaningful community activity.

The proposal also draws on Granovetter's theory of weak ties, which holds that acquaintance-level connections across social clusters are the primary mechanism through which employment opportunities are discovered. CoVr is designed to generate such connections through cross-group participation and shared worker placements.

== Theoretical basis ==
The original CoVr paper proposed a cyclical model in which psychological capital (PsyCap) enables effective group participation, which satisfies basic psychological needs (BPN), which in turn replenishes PsyCap. This mechanism draws on the PILAR model of collaboration, later extended to the ComPILAR model, which distinguishes egalitarian and hierarchical modes of group engagement on a continuum.

A meta-analysis of the model's predicted inter-pillar correlations found that ten pillar pairs grouped into three predicted correlation levels (reinforcing, non-feedback, and stabilising) with a probability of random occurrence of p = 0.00119. The egalitarian pillars of Group Prospects and Outgoing Respect showed the strongest and approximately equal correlations with engagement. An evolutionary basis for the model has been proposed through sub-group level selection.

== Policy design ==
The most developed version of the CoVr proposal, prepared for South Australian state and local government consideration, comprises several integrated mechanisms:

=== Voucher mechanism ===
Every eligible resident aged 15 and over would receive an annual voucher of approximately A$500, which can be allocated to any registered community group or distributed across multiple groups. Groups generate income from the vouchers their members allocate, creating a market-like incentive for group quality: groups that provide a poor experience lose members and income to competitors. A public reputation score, member-rated and visible to prospective members on a searchable platform directory, makes this selection pressure visible before a person joins.

=== Weighting mechanism ===
A weighting multiplier of up to 3x is available for groups whose activities address greater community need. Weighting is assessed by intermediary organisations based on published criteria and local knowledge, rather than a centrally defined activity list. A hard budget envelope caps total weighting subsidy spending in any given financial year.

=== Jobs component ===
Groups can nominate community-benefit roles to be funded through a separate government appropriation, with workers shared across multiple groups and employed through intermediary organisations. The types of work funded are those that markets will not organise efficiently because the value they generate is collective rather than commercial, such as environmental restoration, community coordination, and youth support. This mechanism may be superior to a job guarantee since jobs are bespoke rather than coarsely generated by government, and overseen by group members who are passionate about the outcome.

=== Intermediary layer ===
Intermediary organisations (such as SA's neighbourhood houses or community development organisations) serve as the operational layer between government and groups, handling group accreditation, worker employment, complaint resolution, and outreach to isolated residents. Safeguards against capture include graduated concentration controls (market share thresholds at 25%, 33%, and 40%), portability rights for groups and workers, mandatory publication of performance metrics, and an independent integrity monitoring function.

== Potential flaws and proposed responses ==
Several potential flaws have been identified in the literature and in the policy documents:

- Voucher farming: Groups could form solely to disburse membership fees back to members. The proposed response is a proportionate escalation framework: platform analytics flag implausible patterns, intermediary staff make phone calls, and mystery shopper visits follow where concern persists.
- Insularity: Groups may become unfriendly to newcomers, undermining bridging social capital. The proposed response is cross-group activity incentives and newcomer-specific items in group health surveys.
- Demand-side gap: The most isolated residents may not self-initiate participation. Proposed responses include ring-fenced outreach funding, priority referral pathways from health and social services, and observer registration allowing attendance without immediate voucher commitment, drawing on legitimate peripheral participation theory.
- Group health monitoring: A five-item survey instrument measures egalitarian group function (collective goal belief, mutual helping norms, trust, psychological safety, and belonging). Research on peer assessment suggests that approximately half of survey respondents may answer insincerely, but that lower-status members respond more accurately.

== Proposed pilot ==
A two-year, four-location controlled pilot has been proposed for South Australia, covering the Cities of Playford and Salisbury, an inner-Adelaide council area, and the City of Mount Gambier. The indicative pilot budget is approximately A$17M–$24M, with an additional A$0.5M–$1M for a 24-month long-term follow-up evaluation. The pilot design includes pre-specified evaluation criteria, a waitlist control group, and a hard evaluation checkpoint at 18 months before any expansion decision.

== See also ==
- Social capital
- Universal basic income
- Universal basic services
- Job guarantee
- Psychological capital
- Weak ties
- Community development
- Civic engagement
- Loneliness
