= National Academy of Television Arts and Sciences =

American professional service organization

- Founded: 1955; 71 years ago
- Location: New York City
- Products: Daytime Emmy Award; Sports Emmy Award; News & Documentary Emmy Award; Technology & Engineering Emmy Award; Children's & Family Emmy Awards
- Website: theemmys.tv

The National Academy of Television Arts and Sciences (NATAS), also known as the National Television Academy until 2007, is an American professional service organization founded in 1955 for "the advancement of the arts and sciences of television and the promotion of creative leadership for artistic, educational and technical achievements within the television industry". Headquartered in New York City, NATAS membership is national and the organization has local chapters around the country. NATAS distributes several groups of Emmy Awards, including Daytime, Sports, News and Documentary, and Children's and Family Emmys. NATAS is a sister organization to the Academy of Television Arts and Sciences and the International Academy of Television Arts and Sciences, the other two bodies that present Emmy Awards to other sectors of television programming.

== History ==
NATAS was originally established when the Los Angeles-based Academy of Television Arts & Sciences (ATAS) merged with a New York academy founded by Ed Sullivan. The Los Angeles chapter then broke away from NATAS in 1977, becoming the ATAS again and splitting the distribution of the several groups of Emmy Awards as part of their agreement. Among others, ATAS continues to present the Primetime and Los Angeles Emmys; while NATAS is responsible for the Daytime, Sports, News and Documentary, Children's and Family, and the regional Emmys outside of Los Angeles. Sister organization International Academy of Television Arts and Sciences (IATAS), presenter of the International Emmys, was then founded in 1969 as the International Council of the NATAS.

In June 2026, the ATAS and the NATAS announced that they have begun exploratory discussions to re-merge.

== Organization ==
One of its past presidents, Don DeFore, was instrumental in arranging for the Emmy Awards to be broadcast on national TV for the first time on March 7, 1955. Other past presidents include Diana Muldaur, John Cannon, Peter Price, Frank Radice and Bob Mauro.

== Awards ==
=== National awards ===
NATAS distributes several US national level groups of Emmy Awards, including:

- Daytime Emmy Awards
- Sports Emmy Awards
- News & Documentary Emmy Award
- Technology & Engineering Emmy Award
- Children's & Family Emmy Awards
- Public Service Emmy Awards

=== Regional awards ===
19 Regional NATAS chapters organize award ceremonies of their own, awarding Emmy statues similar to those given out at the national ceremonies. They also administer their own regional scholarship and student productions award programs.

Academy of Television Arts & Sciences gives out only the Los Angeles, CA Regional Chapter Awards.

=== Defunct ===
NATAS also supervised the Primetime Emmy Awards until a split between the East and West memberships in the 1970s led to the Academy of Television Arts & Sciences leaving NATAS. ATAS supervises the Primetime and Los Angeles area Emmys, while NATAS is in charge of the other Emmy honors. In 2007, the organization spawned a peer organization dedicated to new media, called the National Academy of Media Arts & Sciences (NAMAS).

== Magazine ==
NATAS published a magazine, Television Quarterly, which started in 1962.

== Controversy ==
Palestinian journalist Bisan Owda was nominated in July 2024 for the 45th News and Documentary Emmy Awards for Outstanding Hard News Feature Story: Short Form for "It's Bisan from Gaza and I'm Still Alive". Around 150 people from Creative Community for Peace signed a call for the nomination to be rescinded, alleging Owda was a member of the Popular Front for the Liberation of Palestine (PFLP), which the United States designated as a terrorist organization. Adam Sharp, NATAS president and chief executive, responded by saying that experienced journalists had made the nomination decision and that the academy had not found any evidence that Owda was affiliated with the PFLP.

== See also ==
- Academy of Interactive Arts & Sciences
- Academy of Television Arts & Sciences
- International Academy of Television Arts and Sciences
