= PCQ =

PCQ may refer to:

- Parti communiste du Québec (English: Communist Party of Quebec), the Quebec section of the Communist Party of Canada
- Parti conservateur du Québec (English: Conservative Party of Quebec)
- PIMCO California Municipal Income Fund (NYSE:PCQ), a company listed on the New York Stock Exchange
- Psychological Capital Questionnaire, a tool used for measuring psychological outcomes
- Phongsaly Boun Neua Airport, airport code PCQ

== See also ==
- PCQuest (magazine), an Indian technology magazine
