= Antonacci =

Antonacci is an Italian surname derived from Antonius. Notable people with the surname include:

- Anna Caterina Antonacci (born 1961), Italian soprano
- Biagio Antonacci (born 1963), Italian singer-songwriter
- Bob Antonacci, properly Robert E. Antonacci, American politician
- Greg Antonacci (1947–2017), American television actor, director, producer and writer
- Joe Antonacci (born 1960), American boxing ring announcer
- Pietro Antonacci (fl. 18th century), Italian composer
- Sam Antonacci (born 2003), American baseball player
