= James MacGregor Burns =

American historian and political scientist (1918–2014)

- Born: August 3, 1918; Melrose, Massachusetts, U.S.
- Died: July 15, 2014 (aged 95); Williamstown, Massachusetts, U.S.
- Education: Williams College (BA); Harvard University (PhD); London School of Economics
- Employer: Williams College (1947–1986)
- Political party: Democrat
- Spouses: Janet Thompson (May 1942, div.); Joan Simpson Meyers (1968–1990)
- Partner: Susan Dunn
- Awards: Pulitzer Prize, 1971
- Military career
- Allegiance: United States
- Branch: U.S. Army
- Service years: ?–1945
- Rank: Enlisted man
- Unit: Combat historian
- Conflicts: World War II, Pacific War, Battle of Saipan
- Awards: Bronze Star

James MacGregor Burns (August 3, 1918 – July 15, 2014) was an American historian and political scientist, presidential biographer, and authority on leadership studies. He was the Woodrow Wilson Professor of Government Emeritus at Williams College and Distinguished Leadership Scholar at the James MacGregor Burns Academy of Leadership of the School of Public Policy at the University of Maryland, College Park. In 1971 Burns received the Pulitzer Prize and the National Book Award in History and Biography for his work on America's 32nd president, Roosevelt: The Soldier of Freedom.

Burns shifted the focus of leadership studies from the traits and actions of great men to the interaction of leaders and their constituencies as collaborators working toward mutual benefit. He was best known for his contributions to the transactional, transformational, aspirational, and visionary schools of leadership theory.

== Biography ==
=== Military service ===
After graduating from Williams College, Burns spent a year as an intern in Washington for Utah Congressman Abe Murdock. He spent a year at Harvard, then six months in Colorado working for the War Labor Board.

Burns was drafted to serve in the Pacific theater as an enlisted U.S. Army combat historian, and was awarded the Bronze Star and four Battle Stars. Throughout his military adventures, Burns noticed that when leadership was mentioned, it was in terms of the traits and qualities of officers, but not soldiers.

=== Academic career ===
After earning his Ph.D. in political science from Harvard, Burns joined the faculty of Williams College in 1947, and taught there for nearly 40 years, retiring in 1986. A member of the American Academy of Arts and Sciences, he served as president of the American Political Science Association and the International Society of Political Psychology. He was also an elected member of the American Philosophical Society. During the early 1990s he taught classes at the University of Maryland, where he was inducted into Omicron Delta Kappa (ODK) and was honored with the naming of the James MacGregor Burns Academy of Leadership. In 2004 he was also awarded the Laurel Crowned Circle Award, ODK's highest honor. In 2010 he won the Arthur M. Schlesinger, Jr. Award for Distinguished Writing in American History of Enduring Public Significance presented jointly by the Roosevelt Institute and the Society of American Historians.

=== Political career ===
A liberal, in 1958 Burns was the unsuccessful Democratic nominee in Massachusetts's 1st congressional district, meeting then-U.S. Senator John F. Kennedy and helping him gain Protestant support to get re-elected, while Kennedy helped him gain Catholic support. Burns gained personal access that allowed him to write his biography of Kennedy, published in 1960, which calls JFK "casual as a cash register," "quiet, taut, efficient—sometimes, perhaps, even dull," and generally too cerebral and lacking in heart. This angered Kennedy's wife Jackie, who said Burns "underestimated" him.

=== Personal ===
Burns and his two brothers were raised by their mother, Mildred Burns, in Burlington, Massachusetts. Burns graduated from Lexington High School in Massachusetts in 1935, and then received his Bachelor of Arts from Williams College and his Ph.D. from Harvard University. He and his first wife, Janet Thompson, had four children, whom they raised in Williamstown after he joined the faculty at Williams College. In 1964, he met Joan Simpson Meyers, daughter of renowned paleontologist George Gaylord Simpson, in New York City when she interviewed him for her best-selling book about President John Fitzgerald Kennedy; four years later Burns and Meyers were married at High Mowing, the family home in Williamstown, where they lived together for the next quarter century. At the end of his life, he lived with his collaborator and longtime companion, Professor Susan Dunn, and remained close friends with his first wife.

Burns died in Williamstown, Massachusetts, on July 15, 2014, at 95, after publishing more than 20 books.

== Views on government ==
As an admirer of a strong leader in the White House, Burns was critical of the U.S. governmental system of checks and balances, which he viewed as an obstacle to progress in times of a divided or oppositional Congress. In The Deadlock of Democracy (1963) and Packing the Court: The Rise of Judicial Power and the Coming Crisis of the Supreme Court (2009) he called for systemic changes, arguing for term limits for Supreme Court justices, an end to midterm elections, and a population-based Senate. Burns also advocated repeal of the Twenty-second Amendment to the United States Constitution to allow effective U.S. presidents to serve three or more terms of office.

== Theory of leadership ==
Burns's Leadership (1978) founded the field of leadership studies, introducing two types of leadership: transactional leadership, in which leaders focus on the relationship between the leader and follower, and transformational leadership, in which leaders focus on the beliefs, needs, and values of their followers.

Excerpts:

- Leadership over human beings is exercised when persons with certain motives and purposes mobilize, in competition or conflict with others, institutional, political, psychological, and other resources so as to arouse, engage, and satisfy the motives of followers... in order to realize goals mutually held by both leaders and followers....
- Transformational leadership occurs when one or more persons engage with others in such a way that leaders and followers raise one another to higher levels of motivation and morality.
- That people can be lifted into their better selves is the secret of transforming leadership and the moral and practical theme of this work.

James MacGregor Burns was interested in the pursuit of a general theory for leadership. According to Burns "others argue that we must construct a general theory of leadership in order that we grasp the role of individual leaders and their traits." Beginning with the Kellogg Leadership Studies Project (KLSP), a 4-year (1994–1998) initiative, to meetings with over 25 scholars over the early stages, sought that general theory, that would encompass all of leadership. The group led by James MacGregor Burns, a leadership scholar, presidential biographer, and Pulitzer Prize winner, contributed much, but admittedly did not attain that goal.

His work has influenced other transformational leadership theorists such as Bernard Bass, Bruce Avolio, and Kenneth Leithwood, and inspired Georgia Jones Sorenson to found the Center for Political Leadership and Participation at the University of Maryland, which Burns joined in 1993, causing the center to be renamed in his honor in 1997 as the James MacGregor Burns Academy of Leadership.

== Books ==
- Congress on Trial: The Legislative Process and the Administrative State (Harper, 1949).
- Government by the People (textbook) (1952; 20th ed. 2003), Prentice-Hall.
- Roosevelt: The Lion and the Fox, 1882–1940 (first volume of two-volume set) (Harcourt, Brace, 1956). (1957 Woodrow Wilson Foundation award and 1957 finalist National Book Award)
- John Kennedy: A Political Profile (Harcourt, Brace, 1960).
- The Deadlock of Democracy: Four-Party Politics in America (Prentice Hall, 1963).
- Government by the People: The Dynamics of American National Government (1963).
- Presidential Government: The Crucible of Leadership (Houghton-Mifflin, 1965).
- Roosevelt: The Soldier of Freedom, 1940–1945 (second volume of two-volume set) (Harcourt Brace Jovanovich, 1970) (1971 Pulitzer Prize for History, 1971 Francis Parkman Prize).(ISBN 978-0-15-602757-1).
- Uncommon Sense (1972).
- Edward Kennedy and the Camelot Legacy (1976).
- Burns, James M. (1978). Leadership. HarperCollins. ISBN 978-0-06-010588-4. OCLC 903255275.
- The Vineyard of Liberty, 1787–1863 (The American Experiment Book 1 of 3) (Alfred A. Knopf, 1982) (ISBN 978-0-394-50546-6).
- The Power to Lead: The Crisis of the American Presidency (Touchstone Books, 1984).
- The Workshop of Democracy, 1863–1932 (The American Experiment Book 2 of 3) (Alfred A. Knopf, 1985) (ISBN 978-0-394-50546-6).
- The Crosswinds of Freedom, 1932–1988 (The American Experiment Book 3 of 3) (Alfred A. Knopf, 1989) (ISBN 978-0-394-51276-1).
- Cobblestone Leadership: Majority Rule, Minority Power (University of Oklahoma Press, 1990).
- A People's Charter: The Pursuit of Rights in America (with Stewart Burns) (Knopf, 1991).
- The Democrats Must Lead: The Case for a Progressive Democratic Party (with William Crotty) (1992).
- Dead Center: Clinton-Gore Leadership and the Perils of Moderation (with Georgia Jones Sorenson) (1999).
- The Three Roosevelts: Patrician Leaders Who Transformed America, with Susan Dunn (Atlantic Monthly Press, 2001) (ISBN 978-0-8021-3872-9).
- Transforming Leadership: A New Pursuit of Happiness (Atlantic Monthly Press, 2003) (ISBN 978-0-87113-866-8).
- George Washington (with Susan Dunn) (ed. Arthur M. Schlesinger, Jr.) (Times Books, 2004).
- Encyclopedia of Leadership (with Georgia Jones Sorenson and George R. Goethals) (2004).
- Running Alone: Presidential Leadership – JFK to Bush II: Why It Has Failed and How We Can Fix It (Basic Books, 2006).
- Packing the Court: The Rise of Judicial Power and the Coming Crisis of the Supreme Court (Penguin Press, 2009) (ISBN 978-1-59420-219-3).
- Fire and Light: How the Enlightenment Transformed Our World (St. Martin's Press, 2013) (ISBN 978-1-250-02489-3).
