= Ryan Lesser =

American artist

- Education: Rhode Island School of Design
- Occupation(s): Art director, creative director

Ryan Lesser is an American video game and board game designer, musician and graphic artist living in Providence, Rhode Island. A graduate of Rhode Island School of Design, he is best known for his design and art direction on influential video games Guitar Hero, Guitar Hero II, Rock Band and The Beatles: Rock Band.

Lesser is an art director at video game developer CD Projekt Red in their American studio The Molasses Flood, faculty at Rhode Island School of Design and Founder of Wild Power Games. From 1999–2018, Lesser served as creative lead and art director at Harmonix. He was a member of the heavy metal band Megasus. In the early- to mid-1990s, Lesser worked with Shepard Fairey on the street art phenomena "Andre the Giant has a Posse" and "Obey," and edited Helen Stickler's video documentary André the Giant Has a Posse and co-created Attention Deficit Disorder with Shepard Fairey.

In 2014, Lesser led a successful Kickstarter campaign for the Harmonix video game Amplitude to ship on PlayStation 4 and PlayStation 3.

== Games ==
| Name | Year | Credited with | Publisher |
|---|---|---|---|
Harmonix
| Guitar Hero | 2005 | Art director, art lead, designer | Red Octane |
| Guitar Hero II | 2006 | Art director, designer | Red Octane |
| Rock Band | 2007 | Art director, art lead, designer | Electronic Arts |
| Rock Band 2 | 2008 | Art director, designer | MTV Games |
| The Beatles: Rock Band | 2009 | Art director | MTV Games |
| Amplitude | 2015 | Creative lead | Harmonix |
| Rock Band 4 | 2016 | Creative lead | Harmonix |

== Patents ==
Lesser is listed as an inventor on the following patents:

| Date of patent | Patent number | Title |
|---|---|---|
| 04/23/09 | 8690670 | Systems and methods for simulating a rock band experience |
| 03/19/09 | 20090075711 | Systems and methods for providing a vocal experience for a player of a rhythm action game |
| 08/06/02 | 6429863 | Method and apparatus for displaying musical data in a three dimensional environment |
| 01/01/13 | D673582 | Display screen or portion thereof with boombox icon |
