= Positive organizational behavior =

Psychological method

Positive organizational behavior (POB) is defined as "the study and application of positively oriented human resource strengths and psychological capacities that can be measured, developed, and effectively managed for performance improvement in today's workplace" (Luthans, 2002a, p. 59).

For a positive psychological capacity to qualify for inclusion in POB, it must be positive and must have extensive theory and research foundations and valid measures. In addition, it must be state like, which would make it open to development and manageable for performance improvement. Finally, positive states that meet the POB definitional criteria are primarily researched, measured, developed, and managed at the individual, micro level.

The state-like criterion distinguishes POB from other positive approaches that focus on positive traits, whereas its emphasis on micro, individual-level constructs separates it from positive perspectives that address positive organizations and their related macro-level variables and measures. Meeting the inclusion criteria for POB are the state-like psychological resource capacities of self-efficacy, hope, optimism, and resiliency and, when combined, the underlying higher-order, core construct of positive psychological capital or PsyCap.

== General overview ==
POB is the application of positive psychology to the workplace. Its focus is on strengths and on building the best in the workplace under the basic assumption is that goodness and excellence can be analyzed and achieved.

=== Origins ===
Although POB research is relatively new, its core ideas are based on ideas of earlier scholars.
POB origins developed from the positive psychology movement, initiated in 1998 by Martin Seligman and colleagues. Positive psychology aims to shift the focus in psychology from dysfunctional mental illness to mental health, calling for an increased focus on the building of human strength.
The levels of analysis of positive psychology have been summarized to be at the subjective level (i.e., positive subjective experience such as well being and contentment with the past, flow and happiness in the present, and hope and optimism into the future); the micro, individual level (i.e., positive traits such as the capacity for love, courage, aesthetic sensibility, perseverance, forgiveness, spirituality, high talent, and wisdom); and the macro group and institutional level (i.e., positive civic virtues and the institutions that move individuals toward better citizenship such as responsibility, altruism, civility, moderation, tolerance, and a strong work ethic).

By integrating positive psychology to organizational setting, Fred Luthans has pioneered the positive organizational behavior research in 1999. Since then, Luthans and colleagues have been attempting to find ways of designing work settings that emphasize people's strengths, where they can be both their best selves and at their best with each other. Thus far research has shown that employees who are satisfied and find fulfillment in their work are more productive, absent less, and demonstrate greater organizational loyalty.

Despite initial studies and conceptualizations, the field of POB is still in its infancy. Further research regarding the precise antecedents, processes, and consequences of positive psychological behavior is needed. The challenge currently awaiting POB is to bring about a more profound understanding the real impact of positive states for organizational functioning and how these states can be enhanced within the work place.

== See also ==
- Positive organizational scholarship
- Positive psychological capital
- Positive psychology
