= Pietro Antonacci =

Italian composer

Pietro Antonacci (fl. 18th century) was an Italian composer. Little is known about his life and only one of his works has survived.

His only surviving work is a pastoral symphony, for two violins and basso continuo, which is in the library of the Milan Conservatory. The symphony was recorded by the Baroque orchestra Il Giardino Armonico under the direction of Giovanni Antonini, along with other works under the title Concerto di Natale (Teldec, 2001).
