= Bruce Avolio =

American leadership studies scholar

- Born: Bruce Joseph Avolio
- Education: State University of New York at Oneonta; University of Akron
- Known for: Leadership studies
- Scientific career
- Fields: Management
- Institutions: University of Washington
- Thesis: Age stereotypes in interview evaluation contexts (1981)

Bruce J. Avolio is an American academic in the field of leadership studies. He is the Professor of Management, Mark Pigott Chair in Business Strategic Leadership, and executive director of the Center for Leadership & Strategic Thinking in the Foster School of Business at the University of Washington. He is a fellow of the American Psychological Society, the Academy of Management, the American Psychological Association, the Society for Industrial and Organizational Psychology, and the Gerontological Society of America.

== Bibliography ==
- Full Range Leadership Development (2011)
- The High Impact Leader (with Fred Luthans) (2008)
- Leadership Development in Balance: Made/born (2005)
- Improving Organizational Effectiveness Through Transformational Leadership (with Bernard Bass) (1994)
