= Young Innovation Leaders Fellowship =

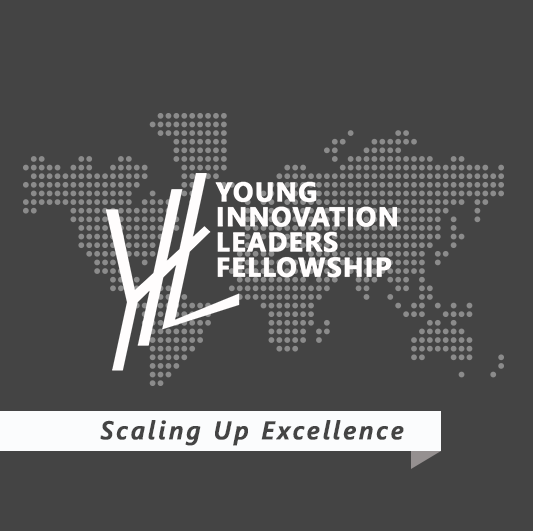
- Trade name: YIL Fellowship
- Formerly: HELP (Hutzpa Excellence Leadership Program)
- Company type: Nonprofit
- Industry: Education
- Genre: Youth development
- Founded: 2018; 8 years ago in Nigeria
- Founder: Obichi Obiajunwa
- Headquarters: Federal Capital Territory, Abuja, Nigeria
- Parent: Hutzpa Centre for Innovation and Development
- Website: www.younginnovationleaders.org

The Young Innovation Leaders (YIL) Fellowship is an initiative of Hutzpa Centre for Innovation and Development aimed at training and mentoring young professionals in innovation leadership. YIL Fellowship runs mainly in Nigeria and in Ghana and is one of the reputable national youth programs in both countries.

YIL has engaged multilateral organizations the United Nations Population Fund (UNFPA) Nigeria, and organizations such as hospitals and universities in solving their practical challenges during the fellowship using its project-based learning model. It is recognized by the African Union Development Agency (AUDA-NEPAD) as a model youth development program.

== History ==
The YIL Fellowship was founded in the year 2018 by Dr. Obichi Obiajunwa in Nigeria. By the year 2019, The YIL Fellowship had opened its branch in Accra, Ghana with over 200 received applications.

== Programs ==
The Y.I.L Fellowship is an annual four-month leadership program in innovation management designed to enable young professionals between the age of 20- 30 achieve their highest career dreams and inspire innovation in their fields.

The YIL Fellowship Program is designed in a three-staged strategy: selection, training and mentoring. The selection stage, an important stage of the program entails selection of based on the measurable and extensible Seeds of Excellence they have grown. The best candidate from each group will be selected. After the selection stage is the Training stage, a key factor required in the program with the goal of using the most productive and comprehensive means possible to educate and preserve the knowledge and principles of success of the participants. This training approach is results-oriented. In the mentorship stage, the final stage of the program the YIL Fellowship creates an effective means of communication with successful and experienced professionals in the required field of the candidate.

The YIL Fellowship four-month leadership program has been held each year consecutively since its foundation till date.
