= Amazing Crowns =

American rock band

Amazing (Royal) Crowns
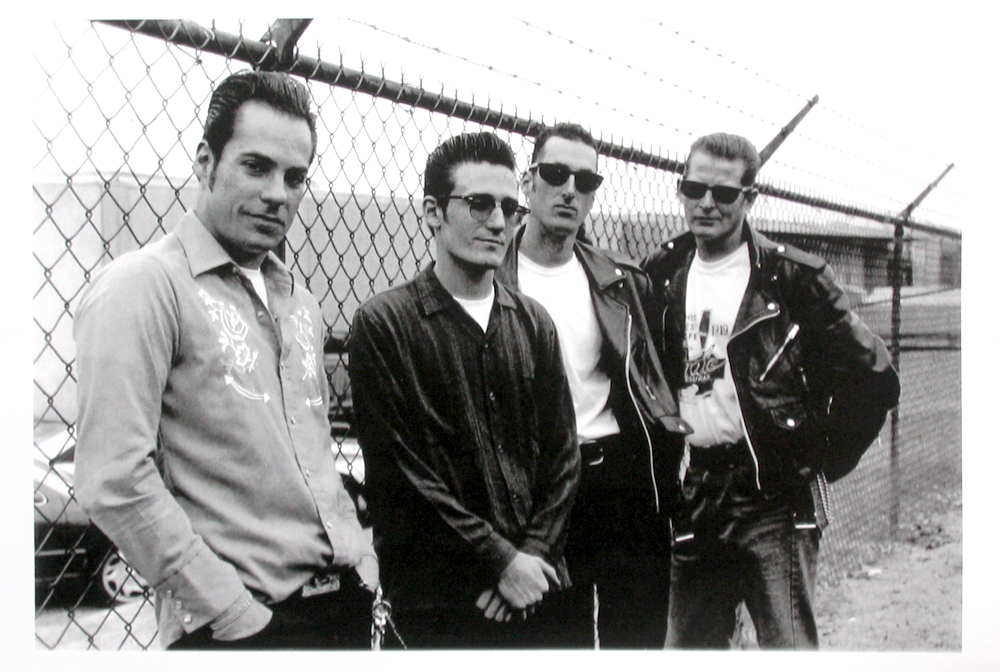
- Amazing Royal Crowns outside the J Strickland (makers of Royal Crown pomade) factory in Mississippi

Background information
- Origin: Providence, Rhode Island, United States
- Genres: Punkabilly; rockabilly
- Years active: 1993–2001, 2012, 2015
- Labels: Monolyth Records, Velvel Records, Time Bomb Records
- Members: Jason "King" Kendall; J.D. Burgess; Jack "the Swinger" Hanlon; Judd Williams
- Past members: Johnny "The Colonel" Maguire; Nate "Super 8" Moir; Dana Stewart; Ron North; Dennis Del Prete

The Amazing Crowns (formerly Amazing Royal Crowns) is a rock band that began in Providence, Rhode Island in 1993. The lineup of the Crowns consists of vocalist Jason "King" Kendall, bassist Jack "the Swinger" Hanlon, guitarist J.D. Burgess, and drummer Judd Williams. The band's music has been described as "a hot & fast concotion of punked-up rockabilly".

== Career ==
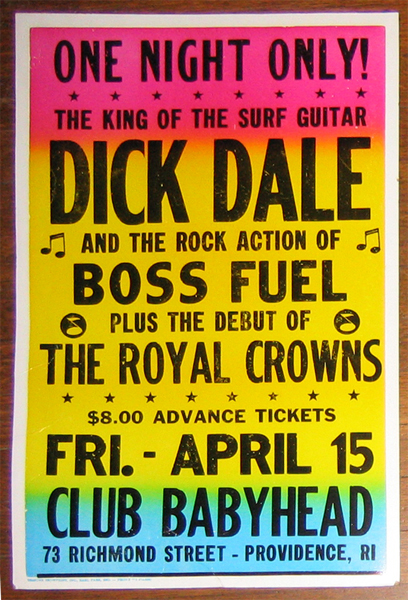
Poster promoting first ever performance by The Royal Crowns in April 1994.

The Royal Crowns formed April 1993 in Providence, Rhode Island. The original line-up featured Jason Kendall on vocals and maracas, Johnny Maguire on guitar, Jack Hanlon on standup bass and the band's friend Tina on drums. Their debut show was on April 15, 1994, as an opening act for Dick Dale in Providence. The band went through several drummers before sticking with Judd Williams

During Warped Tour 1997, the band shared stages with The Royal Crown Revue whose singer Eddie Nichols suggested they change their name as it was starting to cause confusion with booking agents. The band changed their name to the Amazing Royal Crowns, hoping that the added "Amazing" would be enough to clear up any confusion.

The band won the 1997 WBCN Rock & Roll Rumble in Boston and had returned from a nationwide tour when Nate (drummer) left the band. Judd Williams was added to the lineup and they went on to win four Kahlua Boston Music Awards (Rising Star, Debut Album of the Year, Video of the Year and Outstanding Club Band) in 1998. The band started touring extensively on their own and with other bands such as the Mighty Mighty Bosstones, The Cramps, Reverend Horton Heat, Tiger Army, Social Distortion, The Kings of Nuthin' and many others.

The band recorded their first two singles and full-length self-titled album on their own label Kingdom Records. The album's sales performance led to the band being signed by Boston independent label Monolyth Records who in turn licensed the album to Walter Yetnikoff's newly formed label Velvel Records. Velvel re-released The Amazing Royal Crowns in 1998 with updated packaging before shutting down the following year.

In 1998, as the band's popularity started to surge, they were hit with two major obstacles. During a tour stop in Florida, Johnny Maguire quit the band 2 weeks before the group was to leave for an Australian tour. They were also forced to change their name again mid-tour in response to a lawsuit brought by Royal Crown Revue.

Now called The Amazing Crowns, The band lineup was cemented with the addition of guitarist J.D Burgess. They toured a bit with JD then got to work recording their follow up full-length record with Joe Gittleman producing. As a sarcastic retort to the Royal Crown Revue lawsuit, they titled this album Royal. The cover for Royal was an original piece painted by artist and Mekons cofounder Jon Langford. The band signed to Time Bomb Records and Royal was scheduled to be released in June 2000.

The band released a live offering to fans in March 2000 as a way of thanking them as they waited for Royal be released. The Payback Live album was recorded over three nights at the bands yearly hometown festival "The Providence Payback".

The Amazing Crowns disbanded in late 2001 with one last performance at Lupo's Heartbreak Hotel in Providence.

On December 31, 2012, the band reunited to perform a set during the annual Hometown Throwdown at the House of Blues in Boston, at the request of The Mighty Mighty Bosstones.

In 2015, the band reunited once again to play a headlining set at the Cobra Lounge in Chicago to honor the life of their friend and touring partner, Erik "HiFi" Kish of Hi-Fi and the Roadburners, who died as the result of a motorcycle accident.

== Reviews ==
Rolling Stone magazine described their personal style in the following passage:

King and the Swinger saunter into the exalted Middle East nightclub, their gabardine shirtsleeves creased and their coiffures slightly greased. One part retro and three parts cool...

According to an Allmusic reviewer:

If you can't get enough of retro sounds and styles, the self-titled debut by Rhode Island's Amazing Royal Crowns is for you. Equal parts punk (a la X), rockabilly (Reverend Horton Heat), and swing (Brian Setzer Orchestra), the Crowns successfully capture the excitement of their live act on their debut, undoubtedly due to the fact that it was recorded in only two days. And impressively, not one overdub was used during the debut's recording. The only criticism is that the songs tend to sound similar after a while, but it doesn't spell disaster for the group, since their energetic, party-hearty performances save the day. Highlights include the guitar-fest instrumental "Gretschy" (named after Johnny Maguire's Gretsch guitar), the "dedicated to Johnny Cash" "Rollercoaster," and the opening rocker "Shiverin' In the Corner." Horns are used to great effect on "Do the Devil," while the music included in "Scene of the Crime" is pure Duane Eddy. The Amazing Royal Crowns should have no problem breaking through in the retro-heavy '90s.

== Discography ==
=== Studio albums ===
- Amazing Royal Crowns (1997)
- Royal (2000)

=== Live albums ===
- "Payback Live!" (2000)

=== EPs ===
- "Holiday Bootleg" (1998)

=== Singles ===
- "Amazing Sounds Of... The Royal Crowns" (1995)
- "Fireball Stomp" (1996)
- "Chop Shop/ Amateur Night" (1999)
