= Roosevelt: The Soldier of Freedom =

1970 biography by James MacGregor Burns

- Author: James MacGregor Burns
- Genre: history
- Publisher: Harcourt Brace Jovanovich
- Publication date: 1970
- Publication place: US
- Pages: 722
- Awards: Pulitzer Prize for History
- ISBN: 9780151788712

Roosevelt: The Soldier Of Freedom, 1940-1945 is a 1970 biography of US President Franklin D. Roosevelt by James MacGregor Burns, published by Harcourt Brace Jovanovich. The book won the 1971 Pulitzer Prize for History and the National Book Award for Nonfiction (History and Biography). It is a sequel to Roosevelt: The Lion and the Fox (1956).
