= The Leadership Quarterly =

Bimonthly peer-reviewed journal

- Subject: Leadership
- Language: English
- Edited by: George C. Banks

Publication details
- History: 1990–present
- Publisher: Elsevier
- Frequency: Bimonthly
- Impact factor: 9.7 (2024)

Standard abbreviations
- ISO 4: Leadersh. Q.

Indexing
- CODEN: LEQUEN
- ISSN: 1048-9843 (print); 1873-3409 (web)
- LCCN: 91650980
- OCLC no.: 780556109

Links
- Journal homepage; Online access; Online archive

The Leadership Quarterly is a bimonthly peer-reviewed multidisciplinary social science journal. It is dedicated to the scientific study of leadership. The journal has a broad focus and publishers papers from various fields of social science (psychology, economics, political science, sociology) as well as of biological science (e.g., evolutionary psychology). The journal also publishes methodological advances.

The journal was established in 1990 by JAI Press. It is currently published by Elsevier, which acquired JAI Press in 1998. Under the editorship of John Antonakis the journal made a major strategic turn in 2017 toward Open science and robust causal designs having policy implications. The current editor-in-chief, George C. Banks (University of N. Carolina, Charlotte), is further pushing in this direction. According to the Journal Citation Reports, the journal has a 2024 impact factor of 9.7; it is ranked 2/115 journals in Applied Psychology (and 2/115 when using the JCI metric, see Impact factor#Related indices), and 15/420 journals in Management (and 6/421 on the JCI metric). According to various journal quality lists, The Leadership Quarterly is highly ranked. Its acceptance rate is historically below 10%, and in the latest editorial it was reported to be 7%

Former editors include:

- John Antonakis, University of Lausanne, Switzerland, 2017-2022
- Leanne E. Atwater, University of Houston, USA, 2010-2016
- Michael D. Mumford, University of Oklahoma, USA, 2005-2010
- James G. Hunt, Texas Tech University, USA, 1999-2004
- Francis Yammarino, State University of New York at Binghamton, USA, 1992-1998
- Henry L. Tosi, Jr., University of Florida, 1991-1992
- Robert J. House, University of Pennsylvania, 1991-1992
- Bernard M. Bass, State University of New York at Binghamton, 1990

== Awards ==
The journal was recently distinguished by one of its recent articles, which won the 2018 Ig Nobel prize in Economics.
