= Bernard Bass =

American psychologist and leadership pioneer

- Born: Bernard Morris Bass; June 11, 1925; Bronx, New York City, New York
- Died: October 11, 2007 (aged 82); Binghamton, New York
- Education: Ohio State University
- Known for: Transformational leadership
- Spouse: Ruth Bass
- Awards: Society for Industrial and Organizational Psychology Distinguished Scientific Contributions Award (1994)
- Scientific career
- Fields: Leadership studies Organizational behavior
- Workplaces: Binghamton University
- Thesis: Comparison of the Leaderless Group Discussion and the Individual Interview in the Selection of Sales and Management Trainees (1949)

Bernard Morris Bass (June 11, 1925 – October 11, 2007) was an American scholar in the fields of leadership studies and organizational behavior. He was distinguished professor emeritus in the School of Management at Binghamton University, where he was also the founding director of the Center for Leadership Studies. He was a founding editor-in-chief of Leadership Quarterly. He was also a fellow of the Society for Industrial and Organizational Psychology and the Academy of Management. He is well known for his research on transformational leadership, which was inspired by the work of James MacGregor Burns. His Bass Handbook of Leadership has been described as "the authoritative resource book in leadership". When he retired from Binghamton University, he was the most cited leadership scholar in the world. His awards included the Society for Industrial and Organizational Psychology's Distinguished Scientific Contributions Award (1994), the Society of Psychologists in Management's Distinguished Practice in Psychology award (1997), the Academy of Management's Eminent Leadership Scholar Award (2006), and the Lifetime Achievement Award from the International Leadership Association's Leadership Legacy Program (2008). In 2018, the Center for Leadership Studies that Bass helped to establish in 1987 was renamed in honor of him and his wife, Ruth.
