= Fred Luthans =

American academic

- Born: June 28, 1939 (age 87); Clinton, Iowa, U.S.
- Education: Clinton, Iowa High School, 1957 (Inaugural Alumni Hall of Fame) and University of Iowa (Distinguished Alumni Award)
- Occupation: Academic
- Employer: University of Nebraska–Lincoln
- Known for: Psychological Capital (PsyCap); Positive Organizational Behavior; Organizational Behavior Modification (O.B.Mod.)
- Spouse: Katharine (Kay)
- Children: Kristin (Luthans) Noble; Brett; Kyle; Paige (Luthans) Sanford
- Parent(s): Carl & Leona
- Relatives: Sister: Nancy (Luthans) Olson

Fred Luthans (born June 28, 1939, in Clinton, Iowa) is a management professor specializing in organizational behavior. He is the university and George Holmes Distinguished Professor of Management, emeritus at the University of Nebraska–Lincoln.

== Education ==
Luthans graduated from the University of Iowa with a B.A. in mathematics in 1961, an MBA in 1962, and a Ph.D. in management and psychology in 1965. Iowa Professors Henry Albers and Max Wortman were his PhD academic advisers. He took post-doctoral seminars in management at Columbia University while serving in the United States Army stationed at the United States Military Academy, West Point.

== Academic career ==
After serving as an Army captain teaching psychology and leadership to cadets at West Point from 1965 to 1967, Luthans joined the faculty of the Department of Management at the University of Nebraska–Lincoln, where he remained for his entire academic career. In 1986, he was elected president of the Academy of Management. In 1997, he received the academy's Distinguished Management Educator Award, in 2017 received the Organizational Behavior Division's Lifetime Achievement Award, and in 2022 the Distinguished Scholarly Contributions to Management Award.

== Research ==
As a scholar of management, Luthans applied behavioral science for the purpose of managing human behavior in organizations. His textbook Organizational Behavior, now in its 14th edition, has been widely used over the years.

Luthans's initial research applied theories associated with positive reinforcement and behaviorism to improving employee performance. A meta-analysis mainly consisting of studies he and colleagues conducted indicated a strong relationship between his concept of "organizational behavior modification" (O.B.Mod.)and improved employee performance in both manufacturing and service organizations.

In the 1980s, Luthans conducted observational, qualitative/mixed method research on what managers do in their day-to-day activities. His research showed the importance of playing the game (e.g., networking, politicking and interacting with outsiders) in order to get ahead in organizations. This research was summarized in the Luthans, Hodgetts & Rosenkrantz book "Real Managers" (Ballinger, 1988) and has recently been updated and re-published as "Real Managers Revisited" by Hogan Assessment Systems, Inc, 2019.

In the 1990s, with globalization taking the forefront in the management field, Luthans's research also took on an international focus and resulted in his 1991 book (co-authored with Richard Hodgetts and, in later editions, Jonathan Doh) International Management (now in 12th Edition, McGraw-Hill). Luthans previous work in both behavioral management and managerial activities were tested in other cultures, mainly Asia and Eastern Europe. During this period he also focused on taking Bandura's social learning theories and research to the workplace.

Luthans founded and with colleagues conducted research on positive psychological capital, or PsyCap. This second-order, core construct of PsyCap is composed of the criteria meeting (theory/research, valid measurement, state-like/open-to-development, desired impact) first-order psychological resources of hope, efficacy, resilience, and optimism or the "HERO Within". The initial research found that overall PsyCap is more closely related to both performance and satisfaction than is each of the individual components. Through basic research published in peer-reviewed academic journals, Luthans and colleagues research have demonstrated that PsyCap is open to development and can be improved with self- and group training and is significantly related to desired work-related attitudes, behaviors and performance, and more recently various dimensions of well-being. This research effort has resulted in Luthans recognition by the Web of Science as being in the 2017 Top 1% of Citations of researchers in all fields in the world and, in a 2018 analysis conducted by Aguinis et al. published in AMLE, he was found to be #1 in citations in Organizational Behavior textbooks. In the spring of 2023, his Google Scholar Profile indicates over 143,000 citations, h-index of 120 (120 publications with 120 or more citations), and i-10 index of 286 (286 publications with 10 or more citations).

== Selected bibliography ==
- Avey, J., Luthans, F., Smith, R.M., & Palmer, N.F. (2010). Impact of positive psychological capital on employee well-being over time. Journal of Occupational Health Psychology, 15, 17–28.
- Avey, J., Reichard, R., Luthans, F., & Mhatre, K. H. (2011). Meta-analysis of the impact of positive psychological capital on employee attitudes, behaviors, and performance. Human Resource Development Quarterly, 22, 127–152.
- Luthans, F. (1973). Organizational behavior. New York: McGraw-Hill. ISBN 0-07-125930-9
- Luthans, F. (1988). Successful vs. effective real managers. Academy of Management Executive, 2, 127–132.
- Luthans, F. (2002). The need for and meaning of positive organizational behavior. Journal of Organizational Behavior, 6, 695–706.
- Luthans, F. (2002). Positive organizational behavior: Developing and managing psychological strengths. Academy of Management Executive, 16, 57–72.
- Luthans, F., Avey, J., Avolio, B., Norman, S.M., & Combs, G.J. (2006). Psychological capital development: Toward a micro-intervention. Journal of Organizational Behavior, 27, 387–93.
- Luthans, F., Avey, J., Avolio, B., & Peterson, S. (2010). The development and resulting performance impact of positive psychological capital. Human Resource Development Quarterly, 21, 41–67.
- Luthans, F., Avey, J., & Patera, J. (2008). Experimental analysis of a web-based training intervention to develop positive psychological capital. Academy of Management Learning and Education, 7, 209–21.
- Luthans, F., Avolio, B., Avey, J., & Norman, S. (2007).Positive psychological capital: Measurement and relationship with performance and satisfaction. Personnel Psychology, 60, 541–572.
- Luthans, F., & Davis, T. (1980). A social learning approach to organizational behavior. Academy of Management Review, 7, 281–290.
- Luthans, F., & Hodgetts, R.M. (1991). International management. New York: McGraw-Hill. ISBN 0-07-338119-5
- Luthans, F., Hodgetts, R.M., & Rosenkrantz, S. (1988). Real managers. Cambridge, MA: Ballinger. ISBN 0-88730-345-5
- Luthans, F., & Kreitner, R. (1975). Organizational behavior modification. Glenview, IL: Scott, Foresman.
- Luthans, F., Luthans, K., & Luthans, B. (2004). Positive psychological capital: Beyond human and social capital. Business Horizons. 47, 45–50.
- Luthans, F., & Youssef, C.M. (2004). Human, social, and now positive psychological capital management: Investing in people for competitive advantage. Organizational Dynamics. 33, 143–60.
- Luthans, F., & Youssef, C.M. (2007). Emerging positive organizational behavior. Journal of Management, 33, 321–349.
- Luthans, F., Youssef, C.M., & Avolio, B.J. (2007, 2015). Psychological capital. New York: Oxford University Press. ISBN 0-19-518752-0
- Luthans, F., & Youssef-Morgan, C. M. (2017). Psychological capital: An evidence-based positive approach. Annual Review of Organizational Psychology and Organizational Behavior, 4:17.1-17.28.
- Peterson, S.J., Luthans, F, Avolio, B., Walumbwa, F.O, & Zhang, Z. (2011). Psychological capital and employee performance: A latent growth modeling approach. Personnel Psychology. 64, 427–450.
- Stajkovic, A., & Luthans, F. (1997). A meta-analysis of the effects of organizational behavior modification on task performance. Academy of Management Journal, 40, 1122–1149.
- Stajkovic, A., & Luthans, F. (1998). Self-efficacy and work-related performance: A meta-analysis. Psychological Bulletin, 124, 240–261.
- Youssef, C.M., & Luthans, F. (2007). Positive organizational behavior in the workplace: The impact of hope, optimism, and resilience. Journal of Management, 33, 774–800.

Preceded by Kathryn M. Bartol	President of the Academy of Management; 1986	Succeeded by Richard M. Steers
