= John Antonakis =

Swiss academic

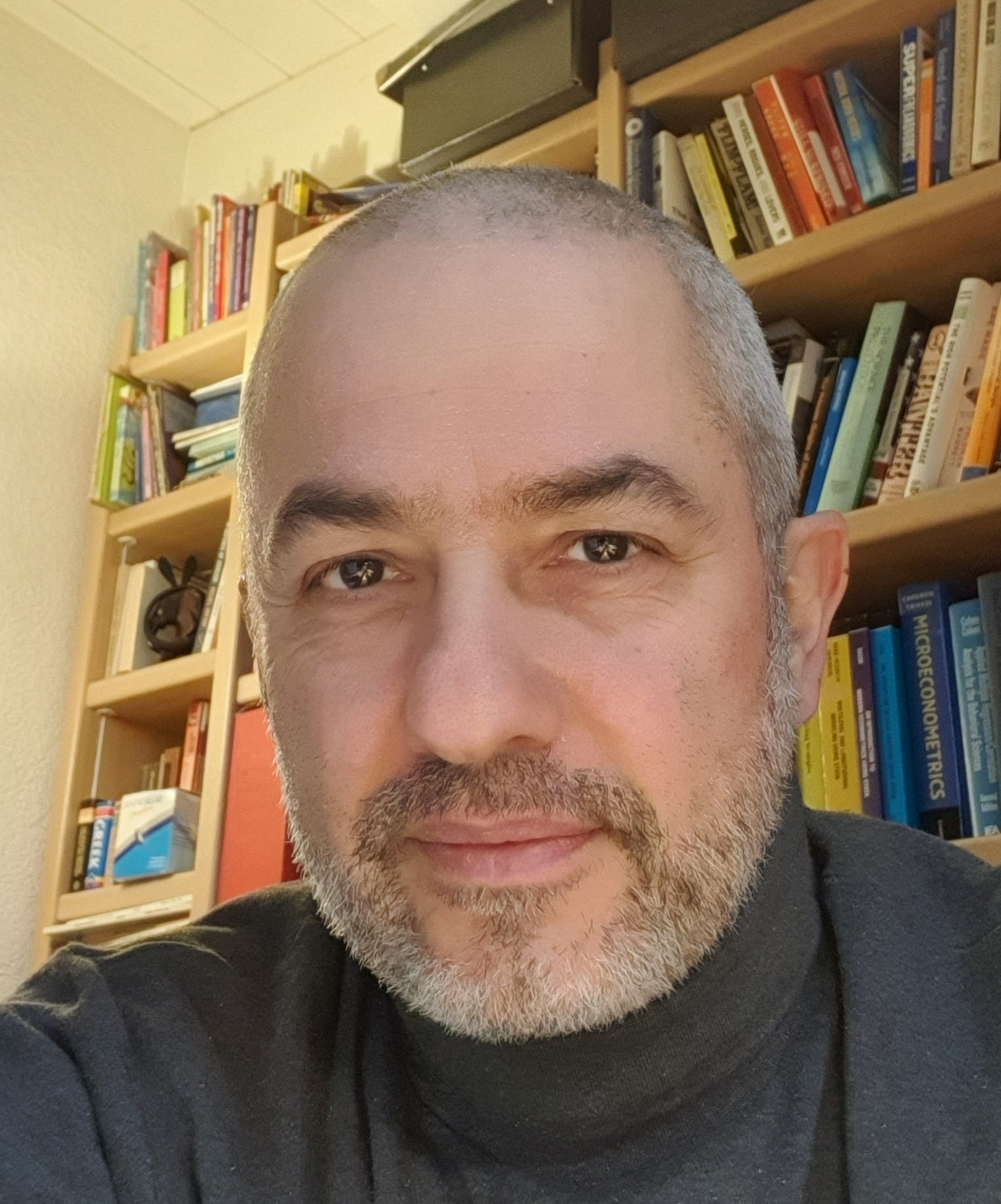
- Born: March 29, 1969 (age 56)
- Occupation: Professor
- Spouse: E. S. Faulk (divorced)
- Awards: Fellow of the Academy of Management, Association for Psychological Science, and the Society for Industrial and Organizational Psychology. Highly Cited Researcher in the field of Economics and Business - 2019 Institute for Scientific Information
- Scientific career
- Fields: Psychology, Management, Methodology
- Website: people.unil.ch/johnantonakis/

John Antonakis (born March 29, 1969) is a professor of organizational behavior at the Faculty of Business and Economics of the University of Lausanne. He teaches leadership and applied statistics courses. He was editor-in-chief of The Leadership Quarterly between 2017 and 2022. The status and prestige of the journal increased strongly during his tenure (from an impact factor of 3.307 to 7.5, touching a high of 10.517), wherein he and his team focused on publishing more experimental research, ensuring the use of robust designs to enable causal conclusions in applied research or proper description of a phenomenon in basic research, as well as the use of open-science practices.

== Early life and education ==
He was born and raised in South Africa of Greek parents (Paul Antonakis and Irene Bardi) and is Swiss naturalized. He received his Ph.D. in applied management and decision sciences (Walden University) with a focus on leadership measurement and psychometrics and was a post-doc in cognitive psychology (Yale University); he did undergraduate work at the University of the Witwatersrand (Wits) in business and economics, and received his Bachelor and master's degrees at Johnson and Wales University in business administration.

== Academic career ==
He specializes in leadership and charismatic leadership in particular. He has communicated his work on leadership to a wide audiences, including work in applied statistics on endogeneity and causality, and general problems in science. His article "Predicting Elections: Child's Play" published in the prestigious journal Science engendered a lot of interest because it showed that little children were able to predict results of election outcomes merely by rating the faces of the politician candidates. A summary of his work on charisma is available in a recent talk he gave at TEDx and a keynote address at the British Psychological Society meeting

=== U.S. Election prediction model ===
He has developed a model with Philippe Jacquart to predict the U.S. presidential elections; their model predicted that Obama would win (refer to Antonakis's YouTube video on the Obama-Romney election race). He predicted a victory for Trump in the 2016 and 2020 elections. A newly calibrated model predicting the electoral college vote share predicts a Trump victory for 2024 with the Republican getting 295 electoral college vote. On the basis of this new model, and using the data available in 2020, this model would have predicted a Biden victory for 2020.

=== Various scientific positions ===
Antonakis has written broadly on topics germane to organizational behavior, including on leadership, social cognition, individual differences and methodology (psychometrics and applied econometrics). A common thread in his research is correct measurement, as well as correct causal specification, design, and analysis. For instance, he has been critical of the concept of emotional intelligence particularly self-measures; his research suggests that emotional intelligence measures are not developed enough to be used for clinical purposes or in work-related or educational settings, and that emotional intelligence is not needed for leadership. As proponent of consistent estimators and causally identified models using econometrics and structural equation modeling techniques, he has also written critiques of Partial least squares path modeling, which he states should be abandoned.

He has also shown that, because of endogeneity issues, much of the research done in management and applied psychology is devoid of causal interpretation.
