= Positive psychological capital =

Positive psychological capital is defined as the positive developmental state of an individual as characterized by high self-efficacy, optimism, hope and resiliency.

== Introduction ==
For decades psychology has been dealt mainly with the treatment of mental illness, although other areas of research and application have existed since its origins. Towards the end of the twentieth century a new approach in psychology gained popularity: positive psychology.

Positive psychology, the study of optimal human functioning, is an attempt to respond to the systematic bias inherent in psychology's historical emphasis on mental illness rather than on mental wellness (Seligman, 2002), mainly by focusing on two, forgotten but classical psychological goals:

- Help ordinary people to live a more productive and meaningful life.
- A full realization of the potential that exists in the human being.

Since Martin Seligman, a former head of American Psychological Association, chose positive psychology as the theme of his presidency term, more empirical research and theoretic development emerged in this field.

Two new branches of positive psychology are being implemented into the industrial-organizational world.

- Positive organizational scholarship- originated by Kim Cameron and colleagues is a research field that emphasizes the positive characteristics of the organization that facilitates its ability to function during periods of crisis.
- Positive organizational behavior (POB) – research by Luthans focuses on valid measures of positive- psychological states that are open to development and have impact on desired employee attitudes, behaviors, and performance.

Drawing from positive psychology constructs and empirical research, four psychological resources were determined to best meet the POB scientific inclusion criteria: Hope, Efficacy, Resilience, and Optimism and were termed by Luthans and colleagues as psychological Capital or PsyCap Positive In combination, the four constructs making up PsyCap were empirically determined to be a second-order, core construct that had a stronger relationship with satisfaction and performance than each of the components by itself. The four components are defined as follows:

- Hope – Is defined as a positive motivational state where two basic elements - successful feeling of agency (or goal oriented determination) and pathways (or proactively planning to achieve those goals) interact.
- Efficacy – Is defined as people's confidence in their ability to achieve a specific goal in a specific situation.
- Resilience – Is defined in Positive Psychology as a positive way of coping with adversity or distress. In organizational aspect, it is defined as an ability to recuperate from stress, conflict, failure, change or increase in responsibility.
- Optimism – was defined by Seligman by Attribution theory (Fritz Heider, 1958). An Optimistic person is defined as one that makes "Internal" or "dispositional", fixed and global attributions for positive events and "External" or "situational", not fixed and specific attributions to negative events. Optimism in Psycap is thought as a realistic construct that regards what an employee can or cannot do, as such, optimism reinforces efficacy and hope

Luthans (2014) refers to these four criteria-meeting positive psychological resources which comprise psychological capital as the "HERO Within".

== Relationship with different organizational outcomes ==
PsyCap has positive correlation with desired employee attitudes, behaviors and performance.

A meta-analysis of 51 independent samples found strong, significant, positive relationship between PsyCap and desirable attitudes (e.g., satisfaction, commitment, and well-being), behaviors (e.g., citizenship) and performance (self, supervisor rated, and objective) and a negative relationship with undesirable attitudes (e.g., cynicism, stress, anxiety, and turnover intentions) and behaviors (e.g., deviance).

PsyCap mediates between supportive climate and employee performance - Psycap

PsyCap and positive supportive climate are necessary for human resources in order to achieve stable organizational growth. Supportive climate is defined as the total support that an employee receives from their coworkers, other departments and their supervisors which helps them with their job demands.

High PsyCap Employees supports effective organizational change

Organizational change is defined as a lack of fit with the environment which intensifies as a result of a gap between the organizational goals and its present outcomes. The employees have the responsibility to adjust and behave according to the new strategy dictated by the management, mostly with fewer resources. During change, different aspects of employees’ PsyCap is put to the test – they have to learn new ways of behavior and be confident to do so, recover from the crisis, be motivated to cope efficiently and to believe in a better future. PsyCap and positive emotions are examples of how personal factors facilitate organizational change. Positive change is defined as every change that the organization undergoes for its own benefit and has more positive psychological and behavioral consequences than negative ones. The role of positive emotions is that they help workers cope with the organizational change by broadening their point of view, encourage open decision making and giving them essential vitality for their coping. This interaction means that PsyCap, through positive emotions, influences the worker's attitudes and behavior, which in turn, influences the organizational change.

PsyCap can be developed

Both experimental and longitudinal research indicates the state-like nature of PsyCap and that it can be developed and cause performance to improve.

PsyCap can be extended beyond work into other life domains such as relationships and health

Recent research has found that measures of "Relationship PsyCap" and "Health PsyCap" are related to both individual's respective satisfaction appraisals and desired objective outcomes such as time spent with family and friend in the cases of relationships and cholesterol and BMI in the case of health. When combined with work satisfaction, these three are related to overall well-being.

Recent research suggests that psychological capital is not only a key resource which enables job seekers to cope with their stress. Study results from Germany indicate that job counselors' psychological capital impacts job seekers' psychological capital, which in turn lowers their stress. This suggests that psychological capital as a key resource can be transferred across organizational limitations. The practical implication is that counselors serve as enablers transferring key resources to job seekers.

After almost a decade of theory building and research, PsyCap is being applied in positive leadership and human resource development and performance management programs in all types of organizations - businesses, health, education, military and athletics.
