= Transformational leadership =

Strategic leadership style

Transformational leadership is a leadership style in which a leader's behaviors influence their followers, inspiring them to perform beyond their perceived capabilities. This style of leadership encourages individuals to achieve unexpected or remarkable results by prioritizing their collective vision over their immediate self-interests. Transformational leaders collaborate with their followers or teams to identify changes and create a vision that guides these changes through charisma and enthusiasm. The transformation process is carried out with the active involvement of committed group members, who align their efforts with both organizational goals and their personal interests. As a result, followers' ideals, maturity, and commitment to achievement increase. This theory is a central component of the full range leadership model, which emphasizes empowering followers by granting autonomy and authority to make decisions after they are trained. The approach fosters positive changes in both the attitudes of followers and to the overall organization. Leaders who practice transformational leadership typically exhibit four key behaviors, known as the "Four I's": inspirational motivation, idealized influence, intellectual stimulation, and individualized consideration. These behaviors promote greater follower commitment, enhanced performance, and increased organizational loyalty by creating a supportive and empowering work environment. Transformation leaders also help followers connect their personal values to the overall mission of the organization to foster a sense of shared purpose.

Transformational leadership enhances followers' motivation, morale, and job performance through various mechanisms. They serve as role models by inspiring their followers and raising their interest in their projects. These leaders challenge followers to take greater ownership of their work. By understanding the strengths and weaknesses of followers, transformational leaders can assign tasks that their followers align with to enhance their performance. They are strong in the ability to adapt to different situations, share a collective consciousness, self-manage, and inspire. Transformational leadership can be practiced but is efficient when it is authentic to an individual. Transformational leaders focus on how decision-making benefits their organization and the community rather than their personal gains.

Followers of transformational leaders exert extra effort to support the leader, emulate the leader to emotionally identify with them, and maintain obedience without losing self-esteem. This strong emotional connection not only fosters greater commitment to organizational goals but also ensure followers maintain a sense of self-worth and personal integrity. As a result, followers may find balance between dedication to the leader's vision and commitment to their own values.

== Origins ==
The concept of transformational leadership was initially introduced by James V. Downton, the first to coin the term "transformational leadership," a concept further developed by leadership expert and presidential biographer James MacGregor Burns. According to Burns, transformational leadership can be seen when "leaders and followers make each other advance to a higher level of morality and motivation." Through the strength of their vision and personality, transformational leaders can inspire followers to change expectations, perceptions, and motivations to work towards common goals. Burns also described transformational leaders as those who can move followers up on Maslow's hierarchy but also move them to go beyond their interests. The transformational approach is based on the leader’s personality, traits, and ability to make change through example. Transformational leaders articulate an energizing vision and challenging goals. They are idealized because they are moral exemplars of working toward the benefit of the team, organization, and community. Transactional leaders differ because they focus on a “give and take” relationship. Burns theorized that transforming and transactional leadership were mutually exclusive styles. Later, business researcher Bernard M. Bass expanded upon Burns' original ideas to develop what is today referred to as Bass’ Transformational Leadership Theory. According to Bass, transformational leadership can be defined based on its impact on followers. Transformational leaders, Bass suggested, garner trust, respect, and admiration from their followers. Democracy was central to Burns’ conception of transformational leadership: voters selected their leaders and voted them out if they failed to deliver on their visions. However, this was overlooked by Bass and others who introduced the theory to the business domain.

Bernard M. Bass (1985) extended the work of Burns (1978) by explaining the psychological mechanisms that underlie transforming and transactional leadership. Bass introduced the term "transformational" in place of "transforming." Bass added to the initial concepts of Burns (1978) to help explain how transformational leadership could be measured, as well as how it impacts follower motivation and performance. The extent to which a leader is transformational is measured first in terms of his influence on the followers. The followers of such a leader feel trust, admiration, loyalty, and respect for the leader and, because of the qualities of the transformational leader, are willing to work harder than originally expected. These outcomes occur because the transformational leader offers followers something more than just working for self-gain; they provide followers with an inspiring mission and vision and give them an identity. The leader transforms and motivates followers through their idealized influence, intellectual stimulation and individual consideration. In addition, this leader encourages followers to come up with new and unique ways to challenge the status quo and to alter the environment to support being successful. Finally, in contrast to Burns, Bass suggested that leadership can simultaneously display both transformational and transactional leadership.

In 1985, transformational leadership had become more defined and developed, and leaders known to use this style possessed the following traits: idealized influences, productive commitment, and inspirational motivation. Transformational leadership made transactional leadership more effective.

== Definitions ==
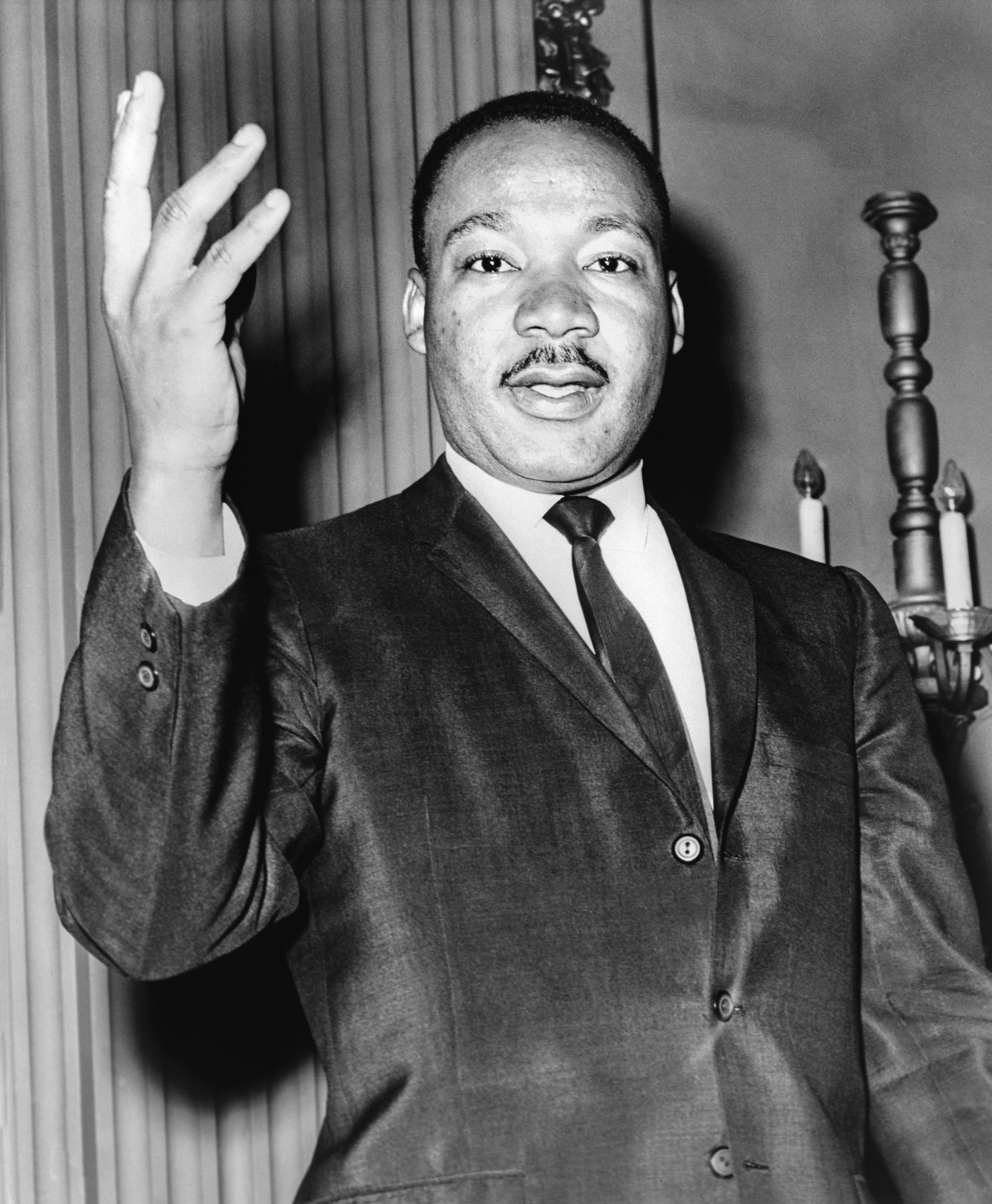
Martin Luther King was known for using persuasive appeals based on reason.

According to Bass, transformational leadership encompasses several different aspects, including:

- Emphasizing intrinsic motivation and positive development of followers
- Raising awareness of moral standards
- Highlighting important priorities
- Fostering higher moral maturity in followers
- Creating an ethical climate (shared values, high ethical standards)
- Encouraging followers to look beyond self-interests to the common good
- Promoting cooperation and harmony
- Using authentic, consistent means
- Using persuasive appeals based on reason
- Providing individual coaching and mentoring for followers
- Appealing to the ideals of followers
- Allowing freedom of choice for followers

Transformational leadership is when leaders inspire and motivate employees to surpass performance goals and create a positive long-term change. As a result, they inspire, empower, and stimulate followers to exceed normal performance levels. Transformational leaders also care about their followers' needs and development. Transformational leaders fit well in leading and working with complex work groups and organizations, where beyond seeking an inspirational leader to help guide them through an uncertain environment, followers are also challenged and feel empowered; this nurtures them into becoming loyal, high performers.

=== The four I's ===
There are four components to transformational leadership, sometimes referred to as The 4 I's:

- Idealized Influence (II): Transformational leaders serve as ideal role models and examples to followers; the leader "walks the talk" and is admired for this. They embody qualities their followers want in their team. In this case, the followers see the leader as a model to emulate. For the followers, it is easy to believe and trust in a transformational leader. This is also referred to as charisma and showing a charismatic personality influences the followers to become more like their leader.
- Inspirational Motivation (IM): Transformational leaders have the ability to inspire and motivate followers through having a vision and presenting that vision. Combined, these first two I's constitute the transformational leader's productivity. A transformational leader manages to inspire the followers easily with clarity. The transformational leader convinces the followers with simple and easy-to-understand words, as well as with their own image.
- Individualized Consideration (IC): Transformational leaders demonstrate concern for the needs and feelings of followers and help them self-actualize. They establish a strong relationship with their followers and act as a supportive resource. The personal attention to each follower assists in developing trust among the organization's members and their authority figure(s). Personally attending to each follower has the ability to develop trust among other members within the organization.
- Intellectual Stimulation (IS): Transformational leaders challenge followers to be innovative, creative, and open to new ideas. They encourage their followers to challenge the status quo and improve within the organization. A common misunderstanding is that transformational leaders are "soft," but they constantly challenge followers to higher levels of performance and create learning opportunities.

Transformational leaders do one thing transactional leaders don't, which is going beyond self-actualization. The importance of transcending self-interests is something lost sight of by those who see that the ultimate maturity of development is self-actualization.

== Leader personalities ==
The appeal of, or preference to engage in, transformational leadership may be influenced by leaders' personalities. The assertive-directing personality type, as measured by the Strength Deployment Inventory, shows a moderate positive correlation with transformational leadership at 0.438. While leaders with different types showed correlations with other leadership styles. The altruistic-nurturing type correlated with servant leadership, analytic-autonomizing leaders correlated with transactional leadership, and those with a flexible-cohering type correlated with situational leadership.

Five major personality traits have been identified as factors contributing to the likelihood of an individual displaying the characteristics of a transformational leader. Different emphasis on different elements of these traits points to an inclination in personality to inspirational leadership, transactional leadership, and transformational leadership. These five traits are as follows.

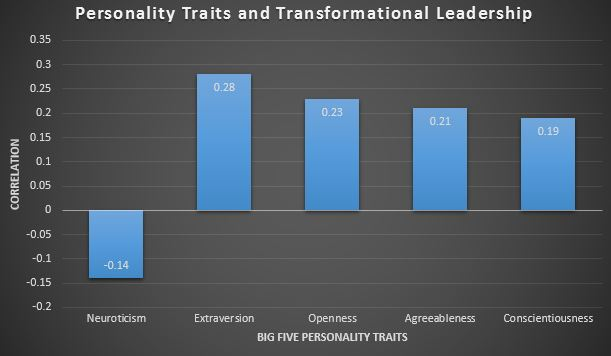
Results of meta analysis finding correlation between personality traits and transformational leadership from data gathered by Joyce Bono and Timothy Judge.

=== Extraversion ===
The two main characteristics of extraverts are affiliation and agency, which relate to the social and leadership aspects of their personality, respectively. Extraversion is generally seen as an inspirational trait usually exhibited in transformational leadership.

=== Neuroticism ===
Neuroticism generally gives an individual anxiety related to productivity which, in a group setting, can be debilitating to a degree where they are unlikely to position themselves in a role of transformational leadership due to lower self-esteem and a tendency to shirk from leadership responsibilities. When neuroticism is reverse-scored, it reflects emotional stability, which would yield a positive correlation to transformational leadership.

=== Openness to experience ===
Creative expression and emotional responsiveness have been linked to a general tendency of openness to experience. This trait is also seen as a component of transformational leadership as it relates to the ability to give big-picture visionary leadership for an organization.

=== Agreeableness ===
Although it is not a trait that specifically points to transformational leadership, in general, leaders possess an agreeable nature stemming from a natural concern for others and high levels of individual consideration. Productivity and idealized influence is an ability of individuals who possess agreeability.

=== Conscientiousness ===
A strong sense of direction and the ability to put large amounts of productive work into tasks is the by-product of conscientious leaders. This trait is more linked to a transactional form of leadership, given the management-based abilities of such individuals and the detail oriented nature of their personalities. Results suggest that transformational leaders might give greater importance to values pertaining to others than to values concerning only themselves.

Studies have shown that subordinates' and leaders' ratings of transformational leadership may not converge. According to leaders' self‐ratings, the extraverted, intuitive and perceiving preferences favor transformational leadership. On the contrary, subordinates' ratings indicated that leaders with sensing preference are associated with transformational leadership.

== Measurement ==
One of the ways in which transformational leadership is measured is through the use of the Multifactor Leadership Questionnaire (MLQ), a survey that identifies different leadership characteristics based on examples and provides a basis for leadership training. Early development was limited because the knowledge in this area was primitive and, as such, finding good examples for the items in the questionnaire was difficult. Subsequent development on the MLQ led to the current version of the survey, the MLQ5X.

The current version of the MLQ5X includes 36 items that are broken down into nine scales with four items measuring each scale. Subsequent validation work by John Antonakis and his colleagues provided strong evidence supporting the validity and reliability of the MLQ5X. Indeed, Antonakis went on to confirm the viability of the proposed nine-factor MLQ model, using two very large samples. Although other researchers have still been critical of the MLQ model, since 2003, no one has been able to provide dis-confirming evidence of the theorized nine-factor model with such large sample sizes as those published by Antonakis.

In regards to transformational leadership, the first 5 components – Idealized Attributes, Idealized Behaviors, Inspirational Motivation, Intellectual Stimulation, and Individualized Consideration – are considered to be transformational leadership behaviors.

== Effectiveness as compared to other leadership styles ==
Studies have shown that transformational leadership styles are associated with positive outcomes in relation to other leadership styles. It is suggested that transformational leadership augments transactional in predicating effects on follower satisfaction and performance. According to studies performed by Lowe, Kroeck, and Sivasubramaniam, productivity (or Idealized Influence) was found to be a variable that was most strongly related to leader effectiveness among MLQ scales. Other studies show that transformational leadership is positively associated with employee outcomes including commitment, role clarity, and well-being. However, the effectiveness of transformational leadership varies by the situational contexts. For example, it can be more effective when applied to smaller, privately held firms than complex organizations based on its outreach effect with members of the organization. However, it can be concluded that transformational leadership has a positive effect on organizational effectiveness. This is because transformational leaders can encourage and facilitate change in their subordinates and encourage their development and creativity.

=== Difference between a manager and a leader ===
Managers are the doers within an organization, group, or community. They are tasked with executing the vision by assigning roles and responsibilities to others. They track progress, assess current states, and identify what it takes to achieve the desired outcome. Leaders are not managers by default. Leaders are usually visionaries who have identified a need to change and are committed to see changes implemented to fruition. What truly sets leaders apart is their ability to inspire voluntary followership.

=== Transactional leadership ===
In contrast to transformational leadership, transactional leadership styles focus on the use of rewards and punishments in order to achieve compliance from followers. According to Burns, the transforming approach creates significant change in the life of people and organizations. It redesigns perceptions and values, and changes expectations and aspirations of employees. Unlike in the transactional approach, it is not based on a "give and take" relationship, but on the leader's personality, ability to make a change through example, and articulation of an energizing vision and challenging goals.

Transformational leaders look towards changing the future to inspire followers and accomplish goals, whereas transactional leaders seek to maintain the status quo, not aiming for progress. Transactional leaders frequently get results from employees by using authority, while transformational leaders have a true vision for their company, are able to inspire people, and are entirely committed to their work. In summary, transformational leaders focus on vision, use charisma and enthusiasm for motivation, and are proactive in nature. On the other hand, transactional leaders focus on goals, use rewards and punishments for motivation, and are reactive in nature.

The MLQ does test for some transactional leadership elements – Contingent Reward and Management-by-Exception – and the results for these elements are often compared to those for the transformational elements tested by the MLQ. Studies have shown transformational leadership practices lead to higher satisfaction with a leader among followers and greater leader effectiveness, while one transactional practice (contingent reward) leads to higher follower job satisfaction and leader job performance.

=== Laissez-faire leadership ===
In a laissez-faire leadership style, a person may be given a leadership position without providing leadership, which leaves followers to fend for themselves. This leads to subordinates having a free hand in deciding policies and methods. Studies have shown that while transformational leadership styles are associated with positive outcomes, laissez-faire leadership is associated with negative outcomes, especially in terms of follower satisfaction with leader and leader effectiveness. Laissez-faire leadership should not be confused with delegation of responsibilities, which is often associated with positive leadership; the main distinction of the laissez-faire style is an abdication of responsibility for the outcome when decisions are made by subordinates in the absence of managerial oversight. Also, other studies comparing the leadership styles of genders have shown that female leaders tend to be more transformational, whereas laissez-faire leadership is more prevalent in male leaders.

=== Comparison of styles among public and private companies ===
Lowe, Kroeck, and Sivasubramaniam (1996) conducted a meta-analysis combining data from studies in both the private and public sector. The results indicated a hierarchy of leadership styles and related subcomponents. Transformational Leadership characteristics were the most effective; in the following order of effectiveness from most to least: productive-inspiration, intellectual stimulation, and individual consideration. Transactional Leadership was the next most effective; in the following order of effectiveness from most to least: contingent reward and managing-by-exception. Laissez Faire leadership does not intentionally intervene, and as such, is not measured, and has no effectiveness score.

Table 2.3

Correlations With Effectiveness in Public and Private Organizations

	Sector	
Leadership	Public	Private
Transformational		
Productive-inspiration	.74	.69
Intellectual stimulation	.65	.56
Individual consideration	.63	.62
Transactional		
Contingent reward	.41	.41
Managing-by-exception	.10	–.02

Results of a meta-analysis of effectiveness of as adapted by Bass (2006) in Transformational Leadership.

== Factors affecting use ==
Phipps suggests that the individual personality of a leader heavily affects their leadership style, specifically with regard to the following components of the Five-factor model of personality: openness to experience, conscientiousness, extraversion/introversion, agreeableness, and neuroticism/emotional stability (OCEAN).

Phipps also proposed that all the Big Five dimensions would be positively related to transformational leadership. Openness to experience allows the leader to be more accepting of novel ideas and more likely to stimulate the follower intellectually. Conscientious leaders are achievement oriented and thus more likely to motivate their followers to achieve organizational goals. Extraverted and agreeable individuals are more outgoing and pleasant, respectively, and more likely to have successful interpersonal relationships. They are more likely to influence their followers and to be considerate towards them. Emotionally stable leaders would be better able to influence their followers because their stability would enable them to be better role models to followers and to thoroughly engage them in the goal fulfillment process.

A specific example of cultural background affecting the effectiveness of transformational leadership would be Indian culture, where a nurturant-task style of leadership has been shown to be an effective leadership style. Singh and Bhandarker (1990) demonstrated that effective transformational leaders in India are like heads of Indian families taking personal interest in the welfare of their followers. Leaders in Indian organizations are therefore more likely to exhibit transformational behaviors if their followers are more self-effacing in approaching the leaders. It is also hypothesized in general that subordinates’ being socialized to be less assertive, self-confident, and independent would enhance superiors’ exhibition of transformational leadership.

Evidence suggests that the above sets of factors act, in essence, as both inhibitors of and substitutes for transformational leadership. As inhibitors, the presence of any of these factors—either independently or especially collectively—could make the presence of a transformational leader “redundant” since followers’ positive behavior would instead be sparked by their own motivations or perceptions. On the other hand, when these factors are not present (e.g., employees in a work group do not see their leader as “one of us”), then transformational leadership is likely to have a much greater impact on subordinates. When such “favorable conditions” are not present, managers—and the organizations they work for—should see a better return on investment from transformational leadership.

Leader continuity was shown to enhance the effect of transformational leadership on role clarity and commitment, indicating that it takes time before transformational leaders actually have an effect on employees. Furthermore, co-worker support enhanced the effect on commitment, reflecting the role of followers in the transformational leadership process. However, there are factors that would serve to balance the exhibition of transformational leadership, including the organizational structure, ongoing change, the leaders’ working conditions, and the leaders' elevated commitment of organizational value.

== Outcomes ==
In Leadership and Performance Beyond Expectations, Bernard Bass states some leaders are only able to extract competent effort from their employees, while others inspire extraordinary effort. Transformational leadership is the key (Bass, 1985). Implementing transformational leadership has many positive outcomes not only in the workplace but in other situations as well. Evidence shows that each of the previously talked about four components of transformational leadership are significantly associated with positive emotions and outcomes in the workplace as well as in team projects performed online. These four components are significantly associated with higher job satisfaction and the effectiveness of the employees. Both intellectual stimulation and inspirational motivation are associated with a higher degree of positive emotions such as enthusiasm, happiness, and a sense of pride in the follower's life and work.

A transformational leader inspires and follows the employee's self-interests, while a transactional leader manages and reinforces generally without employee consideration. Aligning the organization with transformational leaders by committing, being involved, and developing with the employees can lead to higher job satisfaction and motivation.

When transformational leadership was used in a nursing environment, researchers found that it led to an increase in organizational commitment. A separate study examined that way that transformational leadership and transactional leadership compare when implemented into an online class. The results of this study indicate that transformational leadership increases cognitive effort while transactional leadership decreases it.

== Future ==
The evolution of transformational leadership in the digital age is tied to the development of organizational leadership in an academic setting. As organizations move from position-based responsibilities to task-based responsibilities, transformational leadership is redefined to continue to develop individual commitment to organizational goals by aligning these goals with the interests of their leadership community. The academic community is a front-runner in this sense of redefining transformational leadership to suit these changes in job definition.

The future of transformational leadership is also related to political globalization and a more homogenous spectrum of economic systems under which organizations find themselves operating. Cultural and geographical dimensions of transformational leadership become blurred as globalization renders ethnically specific collectivist and individualistic effects of organizational behavior obsolete in a more diversified workplace.

The concept of transformational leadership needs further clarification, especially when a leader is labelled as a transformational or transactional leader. While discussing Jinnah's leadership style, Yousaf (2015) argued that it is not the number of followers, but the nature of the change that indicates whether a leader is transformational or transactional.
