= Transactional leadership =

Style of strategic leadership

Transactional leadership (or transactional management) is a type of leadership style that focuses on the exchange of skills, knowledge, resources, or effort between leaders and their subordinates. This leadership style prioritizes individual interests and extrinsic motivation as means to obtain a desired outcome. It relies on a system of rewards and penalties for achievement or non-achievement of short-term goals.

Although James Downton is generally credited with coining the term "transactional leadership", James MacGregor Burns expanded upon the concept in his influential 1978 book Leadership.

[Transactional] leadership occurs when one person takes the initiative in making contact with others for the purpose of an exchange of valued things. ... Their purposes are related, at least to the extent that the purposes stand within the bargaining process and can be advanced by maintaining that process. But beyond this the relationship does not go. The bargainers have no enduring purpose that holds them together.

— James MacGregor Burns, Leadership, (1978)

Transactional leadership is characterized by two primary factors: contingent rewards and management-by-exception. Contingent reward concerns the rewards that are granted in recognition of effort and good performance. Management-by-exception maintains the status quo, intervening only when subordinates do not meet acceptable performance levels or when corrective action is required to improve performance.

== Burns' concept of leadership ==
Political scholar James MacGregor Burns first developed his typology of leadership in his 1978 book Leadership. He built on the work of German sociologist Max Weber's rational-legal model of authority in the context of organizational theory, conceptualizing leadership as a power-imbalanced social contract between leaders and subordinates, each of whom has specific goals that may be shared or unrelated.

Burns specifically defined and contrasted two dominant types of leadership style: transactional and transformational. He distinguished between the two by explaining that:

The object in [transactional leadership] is... a bargain to aid the individual interests of persons or groups going their separate ways. ... The premise of [transforming leadership] is that, whatever the separate interests persons might hold, they are presently or potentially united in the pursuit of "higher" goals, the realization of which is tested by the achievement of significant change that represents the collective or pooled interests of leaders and followers.

— James MacGregor Burns, Leadership, (1978)

Transformational leadership focuses on clear vision, collective benefits and long-term value. Transactional leadership focuses on short-term goals, bargaining and performance, taking the form of a task-oriented transaction.

== Characteristics of transactional leadership ==
Transactional leadership is understood to possess two primary characteristics:

1. Contingent rewards. Leaders define expectations and identify appropriate rewards (e.g., bonuses, merits, or recognition). These rewards are given to subordinates on the condition that leadership expectations be met.
2. Transactional process. Leaders are matured trade-sited activist's. Leaders take discretionary actions as a response to (in)effective performance. Management-by-exception is exercised within a spectrum of two management subtypes: active management, in which leaders constantly survey subordinates to evaluate performance, anticipate problems, and course-correct before major problems occur; and passive management, wherein a leader assesses performance after the task has been completed and only once the problem is considered sufficiently serious.

The transactional leadership style is highly prevalent in modern society, and across many different contexts. For example, a political leader may wish to ensure voter loyalty; a social media influencer may desire to grow their followers; and a factory foreman may be charged with maintaining worker productivity. In all of these cases, transactional leadership can be thought of as a contractual relationship between a leader — who acts as a negotiator — and subordinates.

All transactions come at a cost. An effective transactional leader is able to identify the individualized needs of his or her subordinates, and will bargain with these needs in order to determine the necessary "price" to achieve a goal. In exchange, subordinates will expect their leader to reward them with appropriate compensation: for example, with tax cuts for voters, interesting content for social media followers, or salaries for factory workers. Transactional leadership depends upon transparency and fairness, but subordinates' well-being is not a primary concern for transactional leaders. Subordinates are paid in the exact terms of the (actual or metaphorical) contract; they "get what [they] deserve — no more, no less."

Transactional leaders prefer to work within the existing structure and the culture of the organization, opting to following precedent rather than implementing change. They emphasize practical and directive action, articulating specific measures of success with subordinates to focus group attention on the extrinsic motivators that are intended to guide their work behavior — as opposed to transformational leaders, who aim for their followers to achieve intrinsic motivation and job fulfillment.

=== Benefits and shortcomings ===
Transactional leaders have a fine-tuned understanding of workers' motivations and the effort necessary to reach a desired goal, and clearly communicate the terms of the conditional reward to their subordinates. Transactional leadership can therefore fail if leaders fail to fulfill their end of the exchange. This leadership style works best in a context of specific goals and short-term circumstances.

The benefits of an ideal form of transactional leadership include:

- Rewards for individuals who are self-motivated and follow instructions
- Rapid achievement of short-term goals/gratifications
- Clearly defined rewards and penalties, with an emphasis on productivity
- Streamlined structure: ideal for environments where structure and systems need to be reproduced (e.g., high volume manufacturing)
- Alignment of ideals in large organizations
- Emphasis on transparency and fairness

Disadvantages of transactional leadership include:

- Rewards reserved for contributions that produce tangible or quantifiable outcomes
- Dependant on short-term, extrinsic motivation
- Lack of accommodation for individuals who innovate/demonstrate initiative (creativity is limited or non-existent)
- Impersonal work environment
- Little to no room for flexibility with goals and objectives
- Focus on quantitative output and short-term, baseline performance rather than quality and longevity
- Criticism only in the face of flailing performance results; little to no positive feedback

Compared with transformational leadership, transactional leadership seems to be better adapted at predicting specific job needs, while transformational leadership seems to be better for managing organizational behavior.

== Maslow's hierarchy of needs ==
Within the context of Maslow's hierarchy of needs, transactional leadership works at the basic levels of need satisfaction, where transformational leaders focus on the lower levels of the hierarchy. Transactional leaders use an exchange model, with rewards being given for good work or positive outcomes. Conversely, people with this leadership style also can punish poor work or negative outcomes, until the problem is corrected. One way that transactional leadership focuses on lower level needs is by stressing specific task performance. Transactional leaders are effective in getting specific tasks completed by managing each portion individually.

Transactional leaders are concerned with processes rather than forward-thinking ideas. Transactional leaders are generally split into three dimensions: contingent reward, management-by-exception: active, and management-by-exception: passive. The type of leader who focuses on contingent reward, also known as contingent positive reinforcement, give rewards when the set goals are accomplished on-time, ahead of time, or to keep subordinates working at a good pace at different times throughout completion. Contingent rewards are also given when the employee engages in any desired behavior. Often, contingent punishments are handed down on a management-by-exception basis, in which the exception is something going wrong. Within management-by-exception, there are active and passive routes. Management-by-exception: active means that the leader continually monitors each subordinate's performance and takes immediate corrective action when something goes wrong. Management-by-exception: passive leaders do not monitor employee performance and wait for serious issues to come up before taking any corrective actions. In addition to the three dimensions of leadership above, another form of transactional leadership is recognized, the laissez-faire dimension. Laissez-faire leadership indicates a lack of leadership and a complete hands-off approach with employees.

With transactional leadership being applied to the lower-level needs and being more managerial in style, it is a foundation for transformational leadership which applies to higher-level needs.

=== Multifactor leadership assessment ===
The multifactor leadership assessment identifies factors in the test taker's leadership style that help identify transactional vs transformational leaders. Individuals who score above 6/12 on contingent reward and management by exception exhibit tendencies to manage using positive and negative reinforcement, transactional management strategies.

=== Theory Y and Theory X ===
Douglas McGregor's Theory Y and Theory X can also be compared with these two leadership styles. Theory X can be compared with Transactional Leadership where managers need to rule by fear and consequences. In this style and theory, negative behavior is punished and employees are motivated through incentives.

Theory Y and Transformational Leadership are found to be similar, because the theory and style supports the idea that managers work to encourage their workers. Leaders assume the best of their employees. They believe them to be trusting, respectful, and self-motivated. The leaders help to supply the followers with tool they need to excel.

== Examples ==
Coaches of athletic teams provide one example of transactional leadership. These leaders motivate their followers by promoting the reward of winning the game. They instil such a high level of commitment that their followers are willing to risk pain and injury to obtain the results that the leader is asking for.

Another example of transactional leadership is former US Senator from Wisconsin, Joseph McCarthy, and his ruthless style of accusing people of being Soviet spies during the Cold War. By punishing for deviation from the rules and rewarding followers for bringing him accused communist infiltrators, McCarthy promoted results among followers. This leadership style is especially effective in crisis situations, and another example of this type of leadership was Charles de Gaulle. Through this type of reward and punishment he was able to become the leader of the free French in a crisis situation.

== See also ==
- Management style – Methods of maintaining order in a work environment
