= Contingency theory =

View of decision-making in organizations

A contingency theory is an organizational theory that claims that there is no best way to organize a corporation, to lead a company, or to make decisions. Instead, the optimal course of action is contingent (dependent) upon the internal and external situation. Contingent leaders are flexible in choosing and adapting to succinct strategies to suit change in situation at a particular period in time in the running of the organization.

== History ==
The contingency approach to leadership was influenced by two earlier research programs endeavoring to pinpoint effective leadership behavior. During the 1950s, researchers at Ohio State University administered extensive questionnaires measuring a range of possible leader behaviors in various organizational contexts. Although multiple sets of leadership behaviors were originally identified based on these questionnaires, two types of behaviors proved to be especially typical of effective leaders: (1) consideration leader behaviors that include building good rapport and interpersonal relationships and showing support and concern for subordinates and (2) initiating structure leader behaviors that provided structure (e.g., role assignment, planning, scheduling) to ensure task completion and goal attainment.

About the same time, investigators from the University of Michigan's Survey Research Center conducted interviews and distributed questionnaires in organizations and collected measures of group productivity to assess effective leadership behaviors. The leadership behavior categories that emerged from the University of Chicago were similar to the consideration and initiating structure behaviors identified by the Ohio State studies. The University of Michigan investigators, however, termed these leadership behaviors relation-oriented behavior and task-oriented behavior. This line of research was later extended by Robert Blake and Jane Mouton in 1964 to suggest that effective leaders score high on both these behaviors.

They suggested that previous theories such as Weber's bureaucracy and, Taylor's scientific management had failed because they neglected that management style and organizational structure were influenced by various aspects of the environment: the contingency factors. There could not be "one best way" for leadership or organization.

Historically, contingency theory has sought to formulate broad generalizations about the formal structures that are typically associated with or best fit the use of different technologies. The perspective originated with the work of Joan Woodward (1958), who argued that technologies directly determine differences in such organizational attributes as span of control, centralization of authority, and the formalization of rules and procedure.

== Contingency approaches ==
In Fiedler’s piece from 1993, he describes how two main factors contribute to effective or successful leadership and points them out as “the personality of the leader and the degree to which the situation gives the leader power, control and influence over the situation” (p. 333-334). Leadership personality can be broken up into two main motivation schools of thought for leaders. Leaders can be task motivated or relationship motivated. The way that Fiedler suggests individuals determine their motivation preference is through the Least Preferred Co-Worker Score or LPC. The second aspect that Fielder says determines success is the specific situation and the degree to which the leader feels in control of the outcome of their actions.

Gareth Morgan in his book Images of Organization summarized the main ideas underlying contingency:

- Organizations are open systems that need careful management to satisfy and balance internal needs and to adapt to environmental circumstances.
- There is not one best way of organizing. The appropriate form depends on the kind of task or environment one is dealing with.
- Management must be concerned, above all else, with achieving alignments and good fits.
- Different types or specifics of organizations are needed in different types of environments.

Fred Fiedler's contingency model focused on a contingency model of leadership in organizations. This model contains the relationship between leadership style and the favorable-ness of the situation. Fielder developed a metric to measure a leader's style called the Least Preferred Co-worker. The test consists of 16-22 items they are to rate on a scale of one to eight as they think of a co-worker they had the most difficulty working with. A high score indicates the test taker is relational in style and a low score indicates the test taker is more task orientated in style. Situational favorable-ness was described by Fiedler in terms of three empirically derived dimensions:

1. Leader-member relationship – high if the leader is generally accepted and respected by followers
2. Degree of task structure – high if the task is very structured
3. Leader's position power – high if a great deal of authority and power are formally attributed to the leader's position

Situations are favorable to the leader if all three of these dimensions are high.

How to apply Fiedler’s Contingency Model:

1. Understand your leadership style - this information can be obtained by completing a Least-Preferred Co-Worker Scale. Low LPC indicates a task-oriented leader and high LPC indicates a relationship-oriented leader
2. Understand your situation - you have to describe your situation using the empirically derived dimensions
3. Decide which leadership style is best - this is mostly determined by which characteristics of a certain situation are low, unstructured, or poor, so the best fit leader can come in and make that characteristic better in that circumstance

William Richard Scott describes contingency theory in the following manner: "The best way to organize depends on the nature of the environment to which the organization must relate". The work of other researchers including Paul R. Lawrence, Jay Lorsch, and James D. Thompson complements this statement. They are more interested in the impact of contingency factors on organizational structure. Their structural contingency theory was the dominant paradigm of organizational structural theories for most of the 1970s. A major empirical test was furnished by Johannes M Pennings who examined the interaction between environmental uncertainty, organization structure and various aspects of performance. Pennings carried out an empirical study on a sample of retail brokerage offices in which aspects of their market environment such as competitiveness, change and munificence, versus organizational arrangements such as decision making templates, power distribution were juxtaposed for possible implications for performance. While structural attributes of offices strongly impacted performance, the evidence for "contingency" was less pronounced.

It can be concluded that there is ‘no one best way’ or approach in management or doing things, different situation calls for different approach to handle, manage, and solve the arising issue concerned. Management and organization is an ‘Open system’, which embrace anomalies or challenges every now and then, which requires ‘adaptable’ and ‘situational’ solution in order to overcome or solve the problem or issue concerned. Other situational or contingency factors are ‘changes in customer demand for goods and services, change in government policy or law, change in environment or climate change, and so forth.

== Stakeholders ==
Contingency theory has briefly been mentioned within the context of the larger scope of stakeholder theory. There are numerous ways to approach stakeholder theory, taking into account the various factors that increase the chances of corporate or organizational livelihood. In order to do so, what is of relevance is to consider the various inflection points that different stakeholder interests may (or may not) pose. As a result, there exists a strategic contingency to stakeholder management. Numerous interests may either conflict or else agree however yet may aim in different directions, and as such are context to complexity in the pursuit of organizational objectives as well as the fulfillment of purpose itself.

As organizations seek to balance different perspectives among stakeholder interests, what is of importance to analyze is the varying aspects of what makes a stakeholder relevant. Since there is a contingent dimension to stakeholder interests, influence may be weighted against some internal order of relevance, as decided by the model of governance in action. The model may be more or less arbitrary depending on a number of factors such as level of criticality between the shareholders in question, management style or styles, as well as the moderating role of external influences.

Context is also applied to whether stakeholders are classified as internal or external. Normative aspects of what ought to make a good decision-making model may also be considered. Research is extensive on what constitutes a good stakeholder strategy with numerous claims and marginal levels of consensus and therefore can be said to be a contingent research area itself. Actors must therefore choose from a wide array of alternatives when considering what is the best model for stakeholder management in a particular situation, so as to facilitate the sustained efforts and performance of organization, financially as well as looking at the broader scope of organizational objectives with a holistic view.

== Support of Contingency Theory ==
The first major strength of the contingency theory is that it has the support of an abundance of empirical research (Peters, Hartke, & Pohlman, 1985; Strube & Garcia 1981). This is critical as it proves that the theory is reliable, based on various trials and research. The contingency theory is also beneficial as it widened our understanding of leadership, by persuading individuals to consider the various impacts of situations on leaders. Another strength of the contingency theory is its predictive nature that provides an understanding to the types of leaders that will be most effective in specific situations. This theory is also helpful, as it suggests that leaders do not have to be effective in all situations and that there are specific scenarios in which a leader might not be the perfect fit. The last major advantage of the contingency theory is that it provides concrete data on leadership styles, that is applicable to organizations developing their own leadership profiles.

== See also ==
- History of contingency theories of leadership
- Leadership
- Three levels of leadership model
- Trait leadership
- Leadership style
- Outline of organizational theory
- Threat rigidity
