= Task-oriented and relationship-oriented leadership =

Models of leadership

The task-relationship model is defined by Donelson Forsyth as "a descriptive model of leadership which maintains that most leadership behaviors can be classified as performance maintenance or relationship maintenances". Task-oriented and relationship-oriented leadership are two models which are often compared, as they are known to produce varying outcomes under different circumstances. Task-oriented (or task-focused) leadership is a behavioral approach in which the leader focuses on the tasks that need to be performed in order to meet certain goals, or to achieve a certain performance standard. Relationship-oriented (or relationship-focused) leadership is a behavioral approach in which the leader focuses on the satisfaction, motivation and the general well-being of the team members.

== Qualities of task-oriented leadership ==
Task-oriented leaders focus on getting the necessary task, or series of tasks, in hand in order to achieve a goal. These leaders are typically less concerned with the idea of catering to employees and more concerned with finding the step-by-step solution required to meet specific goals. They will often actively define the work and the roles required, put structures in place, and plan, organize, and monitor progress within the team.

The advantage of task-oriented leadership is that it ensures that deadlines are met and jobs are completed, and it is especially useful for team members who do not manage their time well. Additionally, these types of leaders tend to exemplify a strong understanding of how to get the job done, focusing on the necessary workplace procedures and delegating work accordingly to ensure that everything is completed in a timely and productive manner.

However, because task-oriented leaders do not tend to focus on their team's well-being, this approach can suffer many of the flaws of autocratic leadership, including causing motivation and retention problems.

== Qualities of relationship-oriented leadership ==
Relationship-oriented leaders are focused on supporting, motivating and developing the people on their teams and the relationships within. This style of leadership encourages good teamwork and collaboration, through fostering positive relationships and good communication. Relationship-oriented leaders prioritize the welfare of everyone in the group, and will place time and effort in meeting the individual needs of everyone involved. This may involve offering incentives like bonuses, providing mediation to deal with workplace or classroom conflicts, having more casual interactions with team members to learn about their strengths and weaknesses, creating a non-competitive and transparent work environment, or just leading in a personable or encouraging manner.

The benefits of relationship-oriented leadership is that team members are in a setting where the leader cares about their well-being. Relationship-oriented leaders understand that building positive productivity requires a positive environment where individuals feel driven. Personal conflicts, dissatisfaction with a job, resentment and even boredom can severely drive down productivity, so these types of leaders put people first to ensure that such problems stay at a minimum. Additionally, team members may be more willing to take risks, because they know that the leader will provide the support if needed.

The downside of relationship-oriented leadership is that, if taken too far, the development of team chemistry may detract from the actual tasks and goals at hand.

The term "people-oriented" is used synonymously, whilst in a business setting, this approach may also be referred to as "employee-oriented".

== Task-oriented vs. Relationship-oriented Leadership ==
In the 1940s, research in leadership began straying away from identifying individual leadership traits, to analyzing the effects of certain leadership behaviors – predominantly task-oriented and relationship-oriented leadership.

The table below compares task-oriented and relationship-oriented leadership styles side-by-side:

Task-Oriented	Relationship-Oriented
Emphasis on work facilitation	Emphasis on interaction facilitation
Focus on structure, roles and tasks	Focus on relationships, well-being and motivation
Produce desired results is a priority	Foster positive relationships is a priority
Emphasis on goal-setting and a clear plan to achieve goals	Emphasis on team members and communication within
Strict use of schedules and step-by-step plans, and a punishment/incentive system	Communication facilitation, casual interactions and frequent team meetings

Mixed conclusions have risen from studies that try to determine the effects of task-oriented and relationship-oriented leadership: some show that task-oriented leadership produces greater productivity, while some show that relation-oriented leaders create greater group efficacy.

However, a common finding is that relationship-oriented leadership will generate greater cohesion within groups, as well as greater team learning. It is also supported that relationship-oriented leadership has stronger individual impact, and a positive effect on self-efficacy.

Fiedler emphasized the strengths of consideration in the context of these two leadership styles in his 1993 publication on the contingency model. Fiedler pointed out that a task oriented leader can be most considerate when things are certain, there are limited unknowns, and their influence and power are high. Additionally task oriented individuals will place primary emphasis on task completion and secondary focus on relationships amongst the team. A more relationship oriented leader will be considerate "when some uncertainty is present" (p. 334). In fact, relationship oriented individuals are likely to reach out to team members in times of uncertainty.

A meta-analysis (Burke et al., 2006) conducted in 2006 integrated a wide spectrum of theoretical and empirical studies, and looked at the effects of leadership behaviors through multiple dimensions, including breaking down the specifics of task-oriented and relationship-oriented leadership into subgroups such as "initiating structure", "consideration", and "empowerment". Its main set of analyses investigated the relationship between task-oriented and relationship-oriented leadership behaviors on the following outcomes: perceived team effectiveness, team productivity, and team learning/growth. Results concluded that task-oriented leadership and relationship-oriented leadership produce a relatively similar perceived team effectiveness, however actual team productivity was higher for relationship-oriented led teams than for task-oriented teams (measured increase of 8% and 4% respectively).

It has also been theorized that groups who perceive their leaders as more task-oriented achieve higher levels of task accomplishment.

== Leadership substitution theory ==
In Forsyth, the leadership substitute theory is defined as "a conceptual analysis of the factors that combine to reduce or eliminate the need for a leader." A leader may find that behaviors focusing on nurturing interpersonal relationships, or coordinating tasks and initiating structure, are not required in every situation. A study by Kerr and Jermier found that some contextual factors may negate the need for either task oriented or relationship oriented leadership behaviors, such as specific characteristics of group members, the task, or the organization.

Groups composed of members who have a "professional" orientation or members who do not necessarily value group rewards, can neutralize or negate both task and relationship oriented leadership. Also, individuals who are highly trained and capable, or those who have a need for independence, may not require that their leader focus on task coordination.

When the task is clear and routine, "methodologically invariant," or involves automatic feedback about accomplishment, task oriented leadership may be unnecessary. Furthermore, a task that is intrinsically satisfying can remove the need for relationship oriented leadership behaviors.

Finally, task oriented leadership can be neutralized/negated by several organizational characteristics; a formal environment, inflexible structure, specific staff functions, cohesive work groups, organized rewards outside of the leaders control, and physical distance between the leader and members. The characteristics of organized rewards, cohesive work groups, and physical distance have also been shown to negate the need for relationship oriented leadership styles.

== Fiedler contingency model ==
The Fiedler contingency model argues that three situational components can determine whether task-oriented or relationship-oriented leadership is the better fit for the situation:

1. Leader-Member Relations, referring to the degree of mutual trust, respect and confidence between the leader and the subordinates.
2. Task Structure, referring to the extent to which group tasks are clear and structured.
3. Leader Position Power, referring to the power inherent in the leader's position itself.

When there is a good leader-member relation, a highly structured task, and high leader position power, the situation is considered a "favorable situation." Fiedler found that low-LPC (Least Preferred Coworker) leaders are more effective in extremely favourable or unfavourable situations, whereas high-LPC leaders perform best in situations with intermediate favourability. The table below shows a breakdown of the theory:

Leader-Member Relations	Task Structure	Leader's Position Power	Most Effective Leader
Good	Structured	Strong	Task-oriented
Good	Structured	Weak	Task-oriented
Good	Unstructured	Strong	Task-oriented
Good	Unstructured	Weak	Relationship-oriented
Poor	Structured	Strong	Relationship-oriented
Poor	Structured	Weak	Relationship-oriented
Poor	Unstructured	Strong	Relationship-oriented
Poor	Unstructured	Weak	Task-oriented

=== Relevant studies ===
An experiment was conducted in 1972 with a total of 128 United States Military cadets in 4-man groups, to test the predictive validity of Fiedler's contingency model of leadership effectiveness. The experiment, which involved strong manipulation and specification of variables affecting situational favorableness, produced strong support for the contingency model.

A study was conducted that determined if basketball athletes of different age groups (lower high school to university level) preferred training and instruction (task-oriented) behavior or social support (relationship-oriented) behavior. Analyses and results revealed a quadratic trend for preference in task-oriented behavior that progressively decreased lower high school through junior to senior levels, and increased at the university level. A linear trend was seen for preference in relationship-oriented behavior, which progressively increased as age went up.

== Situational leadership theory ==
In the 1950s, management theorists from Ohio State University and the University of Michigan published a series of studies to determine whether leaders should be more task- or relationship-oriented. The research concluded that there is no single "best" style of leadership, and thus led to the creation of the situational leadership theory, which essentially argues that leaders should engage in a healthy dose of both task-oriented and relationship-oriented leadership fit for the situation, and the people being led.

The Blake Mouton Managerial Grid, also known as managerial grid model, serves as a framework to determine how one can balance task-oriented and relationship-oriented leadership. It plots the degree of task-centeredness versus relationship-centeredness and identifies five combinations as distinct leadership styles.

== See also ==
- Leadership
- Trait leadership
- Transactional leadership
- Transformational leadership
- Leadership styles
- Situational leadership theory
