= Organizational theory =

Sociological study of social organizations

Organizational theory is a series of interrelated concepts that involve the sociological study of the structures and operations of formal social organizations. It also seeks to explain how interrelated units of organization either connect or do not connect with each other. Organizational theory also concerns understanding how groups of individuals behave, which may differ from the behavior of an individual, often with a focus on goal-directed behaviour. Organizational theory covers both intra- and inter-organizational fields of study.

In the early 20th century, theories of organizations initially took a rational perspective and have since become more diverse. A rational organization system has two significant parts: Specificity of Goals and Formalization. The division of labour is the specialization of individual labor roles, associated with increasing output and trade. Modernization theorist Frank Dobbin wrote that "modern institutions are transparently purposive and that we are in the midst of an extraordinary progression towards more efficiency". Max Weber's conception of bureaucracy is characterized by the presence of impersonal positions that are earned and not inherited, rule-governed decision-making, professionalism, chain of command, defined responsibility, and bounded authority. Contingency theory holds that an organization must try to maximize performance by minimizing the effects of various environmental and internal constraints, and that the ability to navigate this requisite variety may depend upon the development of a range of response mechanisms.

Dwight Waldo in 1978 wrote that "[o]rganization theory is characterized by vogues, heterogeneity, claims and counterclaims". Organization theory cannot be described as an orderly progression of ideas or a unified body of knowledge in which each development builds carefully on and extends the one before it. Rather, developments in theory and descriptions for practice show disagreement about the purposes and uses of a theory of organization, the issues to which it should address itself (such as supervisory style and organizational culture), and the concepts and variables that should enter into such a theory. Suggestions to view organizations as a series of logical relationships between its participants have found its way into the theoretical relationships between diverging organizational theories as well, as explains the interdisciplinary nature of the field.

== Background ==
=== Rise of organizations ===
In 1820, about 20% of the United States population depended on a wage income. That percentage increased to 90% by 1950. Generally, by 1950, farmers and craftsmen were the only people not dependent on working for someone else. Prior to that time, most people were able to survive by hunting and farming their own food, making their own supplies, and remaining almost fully self-sufficient. As transportation became more efficient and technologies developed, self-sufficiency became an economically poor choice. As in the Lowell textile mills, various machines and processes were developed for each step of the production process, thus making mass production a cheaper and faster alternative to individual production. In addition, as the population grew and transportation improved, the pre-organizational system struggled to support the needs of the market. These conditions made for a wage-dependent population that sought out jobs in growing organizations, leading to a shift away from individual and family production.

In addition to a shift to wage dependence, externalities from industrialization also created a perfect opportunity for the rise of organizations. Various negative effects such as pollution, workplace accidents, crowded cities, and unemployment became rising concerns. Rather than small groups such as families and churches being able to control these problems as they had in the past, new organizations and systems were required. These organizations were less personal, more distant, and more centralized, but what they lacked in locality they made up for in efficiency.

Along with wage dependency and externalities, the growth of industry also played a large role in the development of organizations. Markets that were quickly growing needed workers urgently, so a need developed for organizational structures to guide and support those new workers. Some of the first New England factories initially relied on the daughters of farmers; later, as the economy changed, they began to gain workers from the former farming classes, and finally, from European immigrants. Many Europeans left their homes for the promises of US industry, and about 60% of those immigrants stayed in the country. They became a permanent class of workers in the economy, which allowed factories to increase production and produce more than they had before. With this large growth came the need for organizations and for leadership that was not previously needed in small businesses and firms.

Overall, the historical and social context in which organizations arose in the United States allowed not only for the development of organizations, but also for their spread and growth. Wage dependency, externalities, and growth of industries all played into the change from individual, family, and small-group production and regulation to large organizations and structure.

=== Developments in theory ===
As people implemented organizations over time, many researchers have experimented as to which organizational theory fits them best. The theories of organizations include bureaucracy, rationalization (scientific management), and the division of labor. Each theory provides distinct advantages and disadvantages when applied.

The classical perspective emerges from the Industrial Revolution in the private sector and the need for improved public administration in the public sector. Both efforts center on theories of efficiency. Classical works have seasoned and have been elaborated upon in depth. There are at least two subtopics under the classical perspective: the scientific management and bureaucracy theory.

A number of sociologists and psychologists made major contributions to the study of the neoclassical perspective, which is also known as the human relations school of thought. The human relations movement was a movement which had the primary concerns of concentrating on topics such as morale, leadership. This perspective began in the 1920s with the Hawthorne studies, which gave emphasis to "affective and socio-psychological aspects of human behavior in organizations." The study, taking place at the "Hawthorne plant of the Western Electric Company between 1927 and 1932," would make Elton Mayo and his colleagues the most important contributors to the neoclassical perspective.

There was a wave of scholarly attention to organizational theory in the 1950s, which from some viewpoints held the field to still be in its infancy. A 1959 symposium held by the Foundation for Research on Human Behavior in Ann Arbor, Michigan, was published as Modern Organization Theory. Among a group of eminent organizational theorists active during this decade were E. Wight Bakke, Chris Argyris, James G. March, Rensis Likert, Jacob Marschak, Anatol Rapoport, and William Foote Whyte.

== Weberian bureaucracy ==
The scholar most closely associated with a theory of bureaucracy is Max Weber. In Economy and Society, his seminal book published in 1922, Weber describes its features. Bureaucracy, as characterized in Weber's terminology of ideal types, is marked by the presence of positions that are earned and not inherited. Rules govern decision-making. Those in positions of authority demonstrate professionalism. There is a chain of command and position-defined responsibility. Authority is bounded.

Weber begins his discussion of bureaucracy by introducing the concept of jurisdictional areas: institutions governed by a specific set of rules or laws. In a jurisdictional area, regular activities are assigned as official duties. The authority to assign duties is governed by a set of rules. Duties are fulfilled continuously by qualified individuals. These elements make up a bureaucratic agency in the case of the state and bureaucratic enterprises in the private sector.

There are several additional features that make up a Weberian bureaucracy:

- It is possible to find the utilization of hierarchical subordination in all bureaucratic structures. This means that higher-level offices supervise lower-level offices.
- In bureaucracies, personal possessions are kept separate from the monies of the agency or the enterprise.
- People who work within a bureaucracy are usually trained in the appropriate field of specialization.
- Bureaucratic officials are expected to contribute their full working capacity to the organization.
- Positions within a bureaucratic organization must follow a specific set of general rules.

Weber argued that in a bureaucracy, taking on a position or office signifies an assumption of specific duties necessary for the smooth running of the organization. This conception is distinct from historical working relationships in which a worker served a specific ruler, not an institution.

The hierarchical nature of bureaucracies allows employees to demonstrate achieved social status. When an officeholder is elected instead of appointed, that person is no longer a purely bureaucratic figure. He derives his power "from below" instead of "from above." When a high-ranking officer selects officials, they are more likely to be chosen for reasons related to the benefit of the superior than the competency of the new hire. When high-skilled employees are necessary for the bureaucracy and public opinion shapes decision-making, competent officers are more likely to be selected.

According to Weber, if 'tenure for life' is legally guaranteed, an office becomes perceived as less prestigious than a position that can be replaced at any time. If 'tenure for life' or a 'right to the office' develops, there is a decrease in career opportunities for ambitious new hires and overall technical efficiency becomes less guaranteed. In a bureaucracy, salaries are provided to officials. The amount is determined on the basis of rank and helps to signify the desirability of a position. Bureaucratic positions also exist as part of stable career tracks that reward office-holders for seniority.

Weber argues that the development of a money economy is the "normal precondition for the unchanged survival, if not the establishment, of pure bureaucratic administrations." Since bureaucracy requires sustained revenues from taxation or private profits in order to be maintained, a money economy is the most rational way to ensure its continued existence.

Weber posits that officials in a bureaucracy have a property right to their office and attempt at exploitation by a superior means the abandonment of bureaucratic principles. He articulates that providing a status incentive to inferior officers helps them to maintain self-respect and fully participate in hierarchical frameworks. Michel Crozier reexamined Weber's theory in 1964 and determined that bureaucracy is flawed because hierarchy causes officers to engage in selfish power struggles that damage the efficiency of the organization.

=== Summary of characteristics of Weberian bureaucracy ===
Weber identified the following components of bureaucracy as essential:

- Official jurisdiction in all areas is ordered by rules or laws already implemented.
- There is an office hierarchy; a system of super- and sub-ordination in which higher offices supervise lower ones.
- The management of the modern office is based upon written rules, which are preserved in their original form.
- Office management requires training and specialization.
- When the office is developed/established it requires the full working capacity of individuals.
- Rules are stable and can be learned. Knowledge of these rules can be viewed as expertise within the bureaucracy (these allow for the management of society).

When a bureaucracy is implemented, it can provide accountability, responsibility, control, and consistency. The hiring of employees will be an impersonal and equal system. Although the classical perspective encourages efficiency, it is often criticized as ignoring human needs. Also, it rarely takes into consideration human error or the variability of work performances (since each worker is different).

In the case of the Space Shuttle Challenger disaster, NASA managers overlooked the possibility of human error. (See also: Three Mile Island accident.)

=== Efficiency and teleological arguments ===
Weber believed that a bureaucracy consists of six specific characteristics: hierarchy of command, impersonality, written rules of conduct, advancement based on achievement, specialized division of labor, and efficiency. This ultimate characteristic of Weberian bureaucracy, which states that bureaucracies are very efficient, is controversial and by no means accepted by all sociologists. There are certainly both positive and negative consequences to bureaucracy and strong arguments for both the efficiency and inefficiency of bureaucracies.

While Max Weber's work was published in the late 1800s and early 1900s, before his death in 1920, his work is still referenced today in the field of sociology. Weber's theory of bureaucracy claims that it is extremely efficient, and even goes as far as to claim that bureaucracy is the most efficient form of organization. Weber claimed that bureaucracies are necessary to ensure the continued functioning of society, which has become drastically more modern and complex in the past century. Furthermore, he claimed that without the structured organization of bureaucracy, our complex society would be much worse off, because society would act in an inefficient and wasteful way. He saw bureaucracies as organizations driven towards certain goals, which they could carry out efficiently. In addition, within an organization that operates under bureaucratic standards, the members will be better off due to the heavy regulation and detailed structure. Not only does bureaucracy make it much more difficult for arbitrary and unfair personal favors to be carried out, it also means that promotions and hiring will generally be done completely by merit.

Weber regarded bureaucracies as goal-driven, efficient organizations. But he also acknowledged their limitations. Weber recognized that there are constraints within the bureaucratic system. First of all, he noted that bureaucracies are ruled by very few people with considerable unregulated power. A consequence is oligarchy, whereby a limited number of officials gain political and economic power. Furthermore, Weber considered further bureaucratization to be an "inescapable fate" because it is thought to be superior to and more efficient than other forms of organization. Weber's analysis led him to believe that bureaucracies are too inherently limiting of individual human freedom. He feared that people would begin to be too controlled by bureaucracies. In his view, the strict methods of administration and legitimate forms of authority associated with bureaucracy act to eliminate human freedom.

Weber tended to offer a teleological argument with regard to bureaucracy. Weber's idea of bureaucracy is considered teleological to the extent that he posits that bureaucracies aim to achieve specific goals. Weber claimed that bureaucracies are goal-oriented organizations that use their efficiency and rational principles to reach their goals. A teleological analysis of businesses leads to the inclusion of all involved stakeholders in decision-making. The teleological view of Weberian bureaucracy postulates that all actors in an organization have various ends or goals, and attempt to find the most efficient way to achieve these goals.

=== Criticism ===
"There is dangerous risk of oversimplification in making Weber seem cold and heartless to such a degree that an efficiently-run Nazi death camp might appear admirable." In reality, Weber believed that by using human logic in his system, organizations could achieve improvement of human condition in various workplaces.

Another critique of Weber's theory is the argument of efficiency. Highest efficiency, in theory, can be attained through pure work with no regard for the workers (for example, long hours with little pay), which is why oversimplification can be dangerous. If we were to take one characteristic focusing on efficiency, it would seem like Weber is promoting unhealthy work conditions, when in fact, he wanted the complete opposite. Taking all of the characteristics that to Weber are hallmarks of bureaucracy, he recognized that a pure bureaucracy is nearly impossible to attain. Though his theories include characteristics of a highly efficient organization, these characteristics are only meant to serve as a model of how a bureaucratic organization works, recognizing that the manifestation of that model in life differs from the pure model.

With this said, the characteristics of Weber's theory have to all be perfect for a bureaucracy to function at its highest potential. "Think of the concept as a bureau or desk with drawers in it, which seems to call out to you, demanding that everything must fit in its place." If one object in the drawer does not fit properly, the entire drawer becomes untidy, which is exactly the case in Weber's theory; if one characteristic is not fulfilled the rest of them are unable to work in unison, leaving the organization performing below its full potential.

One characteristic that was meant to improve working conditions was his rule that "Organization follows hierarchical principle – subordinates follow orders or superiors, but have right of appeal (in contrast to more diffuse structure in traditional authority)." In other words, everyone in a company or any sort of work environment has the opportunity and right to disagree or to speak up if they are unhappy with something rather than not voice their opinion in fear of losing their job. Open communication is a very important part of Weber's bureaucracy, and is practiced today. Because of the communication it may not be the most efficient, but Weber would argue that improved human conditions are more important than efficiency.

Weber's theory is not perfectly instantiated in real life. The elements of his theory are understood as "ideal types" and are not perfect reflections of individuals in their organizational roles and their interactions within organizations. Some individuals may regard Weber's model as good way to run an organization.

== Rational system perspective ==
A rational organization system has two significant parts: (1) specificity of goals and (2) formalization. Goal specification provides guidelines for specific tasks to be completed along with a regulated way for resources to be allocated. Formalization is a way to standardize organizational behavior. As a result, there will be stable expectations, which create the rational organizational system.

Scientific management: Frederick Winslow Taylor analyzed how to maximize the amount of output with the least amount of input. This was Taylor's attempt to rationalize the individual worker by:

1. dividing work between managers and workers
2. providing an incentive system (based on performance)
3. scientifically trained workers
4. developing a science for each individual's responsibilities
5. making sure work gets done on time/efficiently

Problems arose out of scientific management. One is that the standardization leads workers to rebel against mundanes. Another may see workers rejecting the incentive system because they are required to constantly work at their optimum level, an expectation that may be unrealistic.

=== Formal Organization ===
The concept of formal organization has been touched upon by a number of authors in the subject of organizational theory, such as Max Weber, whose bureaucratic models could be said to be an extension of the concept.

In Chester Barnard's book The Functions of the Executive, formal organization is defined as "a system of contributors' activities that are consciously coordinated by the organization's purpose." This differs from informal organization, such as a human group, that consists of individuals and their interactions, but do not require these to be coordinated toward some common purpose, although formal organizations also consist of informal organizations, as sub-parts of their system.

=== Scientific management ===
The scientific management theory was introduced by Frederick Winslow Taylor to encourage production efficiency and productivity. Taylor argues that inefficiencies could be controlled through managing production as a science. Taylor defines scientific management as "concerned with knowing exactly what you want men to do and then see in that they do it in the best and cheapest way." According to Taylor, scientific management affects both workers and employers, and stresses control of the labor force by management.

Taylor identifies four inherent principles of the scientific management theory:

1. The creation of a scientific method of measurement that replaces the "rule-of-thumb" method
2. Emphasis placed on the training of workers by management
3. Cooperation between manager and workers to ensure aforementioned principles are being met
4. Equal division of labor between managers and workers

== Division of labor ==
Division of labor is the separation of tasks so that individuals may specialize, leading to cost efficiency. Adam Smith linked the division of labor to increased efficiency and output. According to Smith, the division of labor is efficient for three reasons: (a) occupational specialization, (b) savings from not changing tasks, and (c) machines augmenting human labor. Occupational specialization leads to increased productivity and distinct skill. Furthermore, Smith argued that the skill of workers should be matched with the technology they employ.

Although division of labor is often viewed as inevitable in a capitalism, several problems emerge. These problems include alienation, lack of creativity, monotony, and lack of mobility. Adam Smith himself foresaw these problems and described the mental torpor the division of labor could create in workers. Creativity will naturally suffer due to the monotonous atmosphere that division of labor creates; repeatedly performing routines may not suit everyone. Furthermore, division of labor gives rise to employees that are not familiar with other parts of the job. They cannot assist employees of different parts of the system.

== Modernization theory ==
Modernization "began when a nation's rural population started moving from the countryside to cities." It deals with the cessation of traditional methods in order to pursue more contemporary effective methods of organization. Urbanization is an inevitable characteristic of society because the formation of industries and factories induces profit maximization. It is fair to assume that along with the increase in population, as a result of the subsequent urbanization, is the demand for an intelligent and educated labor force. After the 1950s, Western culture utilized mass-media to communicate their good fortune—attributed to modernization. The coverage promoted "economic mobility" among the social class and increased the aspirations of many hopefuls in developing economic countries. Under this theory, any country could modernize by using Western civilization as a template.

Although this theory of modernization seemed to pride itself on only the benefits, countries in the Middle East saw this movement in a different light. Middle Eastern countries believed that the media coverage of modernization implied that the more "traditional" societies have not "risen to a higher level of technological development." Consequently, they believed a movement that benefits those who have the monetary resources to modernize technological development would discriminate against the minorities and poor masses. Thus, they were reluctant to modernize because of the economic gap it would create between the rich and the poor.

The growth of modernization took place beginning in the 1950s. For the ensuing decade, people analyzed the diffusion of technological innovations within Western society and the communication that helped it disperse globally. This first "wave," as it became known, had some significant ramifications. First, economic development was enhanced from the spread of new technological techniques. Second, modernization supported a more educated society (as mentioned above), and thus a more qualified labor-force. The second wave, taking place during the 1970s and 1980s, was a critical reframing of modernization, viewing the push of innovations of Western society onto developing countries as an exertion of dominance. It refuted the concept of relying heavily on mass media for the betterment of society. The last wave of modernization theory, which took place in the 1990s, depicts impersonality. As the use of newspapers, television, and radio becomes more prevalent, the need for direct contact, a concept traditional organizations took pride in, diminishes. Thus, organizational interactions become more distant.

According to Frank Dobbin, the modern worldview is the idea that "modern institutions are transparently purposive and that we are in the midst an extraordinary progression towards more efficiency." This concept epitomizes the goal of modern firms, bureaucracies, and organizations to maximize efficiency. The key to achieving this goal is through scientific discoveries and innovations. Dobbin discusses the outdated role of culture in organizations. "New Institutionalists" explored the significance of culture in the modern organization. However, the rationalist worldview counters the use of cultural values in organizations, stating, "transcendental economic laws exist, that existing organizational structures must be functional under the parameters of those laws, [and] that the environment will eliminate organizations that adopt non-efficient solutions." These laws govern the modern organizations and lead them in the direction that will maximize profits efficiently. Thus, the modernity of organizations is to generate maximum profit, through the use of mass media, technological innovations, and social innovations in order to effectively allocate resources for the betterment of the global economy.

== Hawthorne study ==
The Neoclassical perspective began with the Hawthorne studies in the 1920s. This approach gave emphasis to "affective and socio-psychological aspects of human behavior in organizations."

The Hawthorne study suggested that employees have social and psychological needs along with economic needs in order to be motivated to complete their assigned tasks. This theory of management was a product of the strong opposition against "the Scientific and universal management process theory of Taylor and Fayol." This theory was a response to the way employees were treated in companies and how they were deprived of their needs and ambitions.

In November 1924, a team of researcher – professors from the renowned Harvard Business School began investigating into the human aspects of work and working conditions at the Hawthorne plant of Western Electric Company, Chicago. The company was producing bells and other electric equipments for the telephone industry. Prominent professors in the research team included psychologist Elton Mayo, sociologists Roethlisberger and Whilehead, and company representative William Dickson. The team conducted four separate experimental and behavioral studies over a seven-year period. These were:

1. "Illumination Experiments (1924–27) to find out the effect of illumination on worker's productivity."
2. "Relay Assembly Test Room experiment (1927–28) to find out the effect of changes in number of work hour and related working condition on worker productivity."
3. "Experiment in interviewing Working: In 1928, a number of researchers went directly to workers, kept the variables of previous experiment aside, and talked about what was, in their opinion, important to them. Around 20,000 workers were interviewed over a period of two years. The interviews enabled the researchers to discover a rich and intriguing world that was previously undiscovered and unexamined within the previously undertaken Hawthorne studies. The discovery of the informal organization and its relationship to the formal organization was the landmark of experiments in interviewing workers. This experiment led to a richer understanding of the social and interpersonal dynamics of people at work."
4. "Bank wiring Room Experiments (1931–32) to find out social system of an organization."

=== Results ===
The Hawthorne studies helped conclude that "a human/social element operated in the workplace and that productivity increases were as much an outgrowth of group dynamics as of managerial demands and physical factors." The Hawthorne studies also concluded that although financial motives were important, social factors are just as important in defining the worker-productivity.

The Hawthorne Effect was the improvement of productivity between the employees, characterized by:

- The satisfactory interrelationships between the coworkers
- Classification of personnel as social beings and proposes that sense of belonging in the workplace is important to increase productivity levels in the workforce.
- An effective management that understood the way people interacted and behaved within the group.
- The management attempts to improve interpersonal skills through motivations, leading, communication and counseling.
- Encouragement of managers to acquire minimal knowledge of behavioral sciences to be able to understand and improve the interactions between employees

=== Criticism ===
Critics believed that Mayo gave a lot of importance to the social side of the study rather than addressing the needs of an organization. Also, they believed that the study takes advantage of employees because it influences their emotions by making it seem as if they are satisfied and content, however it is merely a tool that is being used to further advance the productivity of the organization.

== Polyphonic organizations ==
The research of Niels Åkerstrøm Andersen (de) about polyphonic organization arise out of his understanding of the society as functionally differentiated. The society is divided into a number of countless social systems; communication systems with their own values and commutative code. Niels Andersen is inspired by the German sociologist Niklas Luhmann and his theory about social systems. The core element of Luhmann's theory pivots around the problem of the contingency of the meaning. In other words, the system theory becomes a theory of communication and how meaning is created within different social systems.

Niels Anders uses the elements of Luhmann's system theory to describe the differentiation of society and connect that to the evolution of the modern organization. According to Andersen, society is functionally differentiated into a wide range of systems with their own binary code. The binary codes set some distinctions between a positive and negative value and divide the world in two halves. Understandings of the world are made throughout one side of the binary code. Andersen says that an organizational system always communicates and creates meaning through a function system (binary code). In other words, an organization can only communicate through one side of one binary code at once.

Throughout history organizations have always used several codes in their communication, but they have always had a primary codification. Andersen calls this type of organization a homophonic organization. The homophonic organization is no longer exercised in today's society. According to Andersen, today we have polyphonic organizations. Polyphonic organizations have emerged as a result of the way that the function systems have exploded beyond their organizational forms.

A polyphonic organization is an organization that is connected to several function systems without a predefined primary function system (multiple binary codifications). In other words, the polyphonic organization is an organization that describes itself through many codes.

Andersen addresses how it can be difficult for companies to plan their communication and action because they have to mediate between many codes at the same time. There is no longer a predicted hierarchy of codes and therefore no connection between organizations and specific communication. This can also create management challenges for companies because they have to take more factors into account compared to earlier. Andersen's view on polyphonic organizations provides a newer way to critically examine modern organization and their communication decisions.

A scholar closely associated with the research about polyphonic organizations is de:Niels Åkerstrøm Andersen. Niels Andersen believes that modern organizations have exploded beyond their original organizational boundaries. For many years, private companies have automatically been understood as part of the economy in the same way that political parties are considered a part of politics and museums are considered a part of art. Today, concepts are linked together, according to Niels Å. Andersen, is this called the polyphonic organizational-movement. This claim was first made back in 1963 by Richard M. Cyert and James G. March in the book "A behavioral theory of the firm". They said that organizations rarely operate with only one value. According to Cyert and March, organizations actually often operate with more values in their everyday behavior. Niels Å. Andersen elaborates on this assertion in many of his publications.

== Contingency theory ==
The contingency theory views organization design as "a constrained optimization problem," meaning that an organization must try to maximize performance by minimizing the effects of varying environmental and internal constraints. Contingency theory claims there is no best way to organize a corporation, to lead a company, or to make decisions. An organizational, leadership, or decision making style that is effective in some situations, may not be successful in other situations. The optimal organization, leadership, or decision making style depends upon various internal and external constraints (factors).

=== Factors ===
Some examples of such constraints (factors) include:

- The size of the organization
- How the firm adapts itself to its environment
- Differences among resources and operations activities

1. Contingency on the organization

In the contingency theory on the organization, it states that there is no universal or one best way to manage an organization. Secondly, the organizational design and its subsystems must "fit" with the environment and lastly, effective organizations must not only have a proper "fit" with the environment, but also between its subsystems.

2. Contingency theory of leadership

In the contingency theory of leadership, the success of the leader is a function of various factors in the form of subordinate, task, and/ or group variables. The following theories stress using different styles of leadership appropriate to the needs created by different organizational situations. Some of these theories are:

- The contingency theory: The contingency model theory, developed by Fred Fiedler, explains that group performance is a result of interaction between the style of the leader and the characteristics of the environment in which the leader works.
- The Hersey–Blanchard situational theory: This theory is an extension of Blake and Mouton's Managerial Grid and Reddin's 3-D Management style theory. This model expanded the notion of relationship and task dimensions to leadership, and readiness dimension.

3. Contingency theory of decision-making

The effectiveness of a decision procedure depends upon a number of aspects of the situation:

- The importance of the decision quality and acceptance.
- The amount of relevant information possessed by the leader and subordinates.
- The amount of disagreement among subordinates with respect to their alternatives.

=== Criticism ===
It has been argued that the contingency theory implies that a leader switch is the only method to correct any problems facing leadership styles in certain organizational structures. In addition, the contingency model itself has been questioned in its credibility.

== See also ==
- Organizational culture – Customary behaviours in an organization
- Organizational studies – Academic field
- Outline of organizational theory – Overview of concepts related to organizational theory
