= History of contingency theories of leadership =

The history of contingency theories of leadership goes back over more than 100 years, with foundational ideas rooted in the mechanical thought of Taylorism. Later, management science began to recognize the influence of sometimes irrational human perceptions on worker performance. This led to taxonomies of leadership behavior and to contingency theories to adapt leadership behavior to the situation.

== Scientific theory of management ==
When all businesses were small, almost all were managed by the proprietor. Occasionally there might be a steward who would perform the task, but they acted much like a proprietor in thinking. Management and business leadership as a profession arose during the industrial revolution with the advent of businesses much too large to be managed by a single entrepreneur. With this profession a formal interest developed in labor relations, motivation of a work force, and efficiency in production. Frederick Winslow Taylor developed the scientific theory of management which he published in the journal of the American Society of Mechanical Engineers in 1895. Scientific Management focused on the efficient accomplishment of work tasks with an attitude of work smarter, not harder. Taylor meant his methods to be both a win for management in increasing productivity and a win for laborers making their jobs easier. But Taylor as a mechanical engineer focused on the physical aspects of the job and the formal organization of the shop. Scientific management was the seedbed of the Efficiency Movement in the United States. His consideration of motivation was primarily limited to the scientific determination of fair financial incentives for worker performance. Taylor left the discovery of the psychological aspects of management for others.

== Human factors in management ==
The Hawthorne Studies were conducted at the Hawthorne plant of Western Electric from 1924 into the early 1930s. They began as a study of the effect of lighting on worker performance. Elton Mayo was instrumental in identifying the psychological basis of the phenomena observed in the experiments. The studies determined that motivation is not primarily a result of financial incentives in isolation of social factors. The experiments also revealed the strong influence of social systems outside the chain of management on worker performance. The popularity of these studies turned the focus of management thinking to the social and psychological of leadership. The initial studies in leadership sociology and psychology focused on leadership traits. Observation that some people are better leaders than others obviated a study of the personal traits of those leaders. However, personal traits did not ultimately explain leadership success as well as leadership behaviors. In the 1950s, the Ohio State University studies conducted surveys of leader behavior. Originally developed by John K. Hemphill and Alvin Coons (1950) and later revised by Andrew Halpin and Ben J. Winer (1952), variations of the Leadership Behavior Description Questionnaire (LBDQ) developed by these studies are still in common use. Edwin A. Fleishman published one of the first taxonomies of leadership behavior in 1953 with top level categories of consideration and initiating structure. This work advanced the description of observed leadership behavior rather than a prescriptive theory to determine the best leadership style. However this taxonomy formed the basis for the later development of prescriptive theories. The Michigan Leadership studies were also conducted in the 1950s. These studies focused on how leadership behaviors affect small groups. A major result was development of the concepts of employee orientation and product orientation. The concept was directed toward groups of people with an either-or application.

== Contingency theories of leadership ==
In 1957, Robert Tannenbaum and Warren H. Schmidt developed a leadership continuum with relationship orientation characterized by high employee freedom on one extreme and task oriented behavior characterized by high use of leader authority at the other extreme. According to this model, as a leader became more relationship oriented, he became less task oriented. In 1964 Fred Fiedler published the Fiedler Contingency Model of leadership that recognized that the style of leadership that was most effective depended upon the context in which the style was applied. Leadership behavior was modeled as a continuum between Fiedler defined styles as either task motivated or relationship motivated and developed a scale to classify leaders into one of these styles. He considered the state of the relationships in the workplace, the degree of structure in the task, and strength of the positional power of the leadership position in recommending a style of leader for a position. This model Fiedler saw leadership style as an inherent characteristic of a particular leader and a single style consistently applied in a particular leadership position. Robert R. Blake and Jane S. Mouton developed the Managerial Grid Model in 1964. The grid was formed by strength in two variables: concern for people and concern for production. They related these variables with five leadership styles:

Leadership style	Concern for people	Concern for production
Laissez faire	Low	Low
Country club	High	Low
Authority-compliance	Low	High
Team	High	High
Middle of the road	Moderate	Moderate

Some researchers looked for evidence that team leadership or “high–high” leadership was superior in all situations. However, the research was inconclusive. In 1969 Paul Hersey and Ken Blanchard published Management of Organizational Behavior: Using human resources detailing their situational leadership theory. This theory was unique in bringing these concepts together:

- Leadership styles include variable degrees relationship behavior and task behavior which the manager can adjust to the situation independently of one another
- The leadership style can be adjusted to each task and each individual as opposed to treating all subordinates the same at all times

Situational leadership is a prescriptive theory offering the manager guidance about what style to use in a given situation.

Leadership theories, provides a guide on outlining their relevance to school leaders and business managers, highlighting their importance in understanding human behavior and organizational dynamics.

== Expanded leadership taxonomies ==
After the development of situational leadership, a third taxonomic category was recognized independently by Goran Ekvall and Jouko Arvonen in 1991 and Gary Yukl in 1997. Yukl describes the resulting taxonomy as a three-dimensional model of leadership behavior. They were influenced by the theories of charismatic leadership and transformational leadership to add change-oriented behavior to the existing categories of task-oriented behavior and relations-oriented behavior. Love leadership adds metaphorical labels of prophet, priest, and king to these taxonomic categories. Descriptively, these taxonomic categories align with historical terms as shown:

Model	Prophet	Priest	King
Ohio State Studies	N/A	Consideration	Initiating Structure
Michigan Leadership Studies	N/A	Employee orientation	Product orientation
Fiedler	N/A	Relationship oriented	Task oriented
Blake and Mouton	N/A	Concern for people	Concern for people production
Hersey and Blanchard	N/A	Relationship behavior	Task behavior
Ekvall and Arvonen, Yukl	Change-oriented behavior	Relations-oriented behavior	Task-oriented behavior

Towards a more complete prescriptive theory, love leadership suggests that the degree of prophet, priest, and king behaviors be varied for a given situation.
