= Superleadership =

Style of leadership

Superleadership is a style of leadership conceived by Charles Manz and Henry Sims, which is based on individual self-leadership. It is broadly similar to situational leadership theory, rebranding concepts of employee development under a marketable banner. It is often described as "Leading others to lead themselves".

== Theory Development ==
The term was originally coined in 1989 by Manz and Sims in their book SuperLeadership: Leading Others to Lead Themselves. SuperLeadership describes a management style that emphasizes the importance of having individuals “lead themselves”. During the late 1980s and into the early 1990s, Manz and Sims identified what they believed to be a growing trend concerning a demand for individual empowerment that was sweeping the US. According to Manz and Sims, “superleaders” are not like traditional leaders in that their strength does not rest solely in their own abilities but rather in the abilities of those who surround them. Since the release of their first book Manz and Sims have gone on to deliver thousands of seminars and in 2001 they penned another book called “The New SuperLeadership: Leading Others to Lead Themselves”.

== Organizational Application ==
Superleadership focuses on the growth and development of the self-leadership abilities in others. This is done by providing praise along with constructive criticism and feedback. Superleaders are expected to exemplify both strong self-leadership and high moral standards. The four main goals of superleadership are as follows:

- developing environments that promote positive attitudes
- enabling employees to set personal goals
- encouraging observation and comment amongst subordinates
- encouraging members of a group to support and motivate one another

Manz and Sims state that the best way to begin understanding Superleadership is to understand the way each of us influences ourselves to enhance our own satisfaction and performance. They also suggest that widespread self-leadership needs to be filtered down from the top of organizations in order to be properly engrained within their culture.

As a universal theory, superleadership recommends the use of a single style of leadership within organisations; however, this is only truly applicable in long-term scenarios. Certain prerequisites are also present in the theory, such as the assumption that employees' activities are self-directed.

== Contemporary Examples of Superleadership ==
=== In sports ===
Manz and Sims use the examples of Joe Paterno, head football coach for Penn State from 1966–2011, and Phil Jackson, head coach of the Los Angeles Lakers basketball team, as examples of superleadership in sport.

=== In business management ===
Manz and Sims cite Herb Kelleher, the CEO of Southwest Airlines, as an exemplar of superleadership, citing "the emphasis he has placed on every employee as a valuable resource and human being".
