= Substitutes for Leadership Theory =

Substitutes for leadership theory is a leadership theory first developed by Steven Kerr and John M. Jermier and published in Organizational Behavior and Human Performance in December 1978.

The theory states that different situational factors can enhance, neutralize, or substitute for leader behaviors (Den Hartog & Koopman, 2001). It has received criticism for shortcomings due to perceived methodological issues. Empirical research has produced mixed results as to its ability to predict subordinate outcomes.

== Origins ==
Over the years, researchers have developed many leadership theories. Prior to the 1970s, trait leadership theory and path-goal theory were the two heavily researched theories. (Den Hartog & Koopman, 2001). Proponents of trait leadership theory held that the ability to lead is a characteristic some people innately have and others do not. The effort was put forth to uncover which characteristics and abilities leaders had that separated them from non-leaders. Leadership style was another angle researchers took. Proponents of this approach did not believe the ability to lead was innate, rather it was a set of behaviors anyone could learn (Den Hartog & Koopman, 2001).

In the mid-1970s, a great deal of research was dedicated to the contingency model and path-goal theory. The contingency model stated that various leadership styles would be more or less effective depending on the situation. (Den Hartog & Koopman, 2001; Fiedler, 1965). Path-goal theory proposed that subordinates would be satisfied with their leader if they perceived that their leader's behavior would bring them future satisfaction. Subordinates would be motivated by their leader if they perceived that completing work tasks would bring them satisfaction, and if the leader provided proper coaching, support, rewards, and guidance. Frustrations with not being able to find significant results with anyone's theory resulted in the development of reexaminations and new approaches, including questioning which situations necessitated a leader figure and which did not (Den Hartog & Koopman, 2001).

Steven Kerr and Anne Harlan was one of the researchers publicly expressing his frustrations with current leadership theories. In the 1970s, Kerr was at Ohio State University actively involved in leadership research. Kerr was studying existing proposed subordinate constructs such as organizational independence and proposed leadership constructs such as consideration and initiating structure (put forth by the Ohio State Leadership Studies).

Subordinates that are organizational independents do not feel tied to one company and are internally motivated instead of motivated by the characteristics of the organization, such as leader behavior. Leaders are high on initiating structure to clarify their own roles and their subordinates’ roles in obtaining a goal. Kerr and colleagues noticed many studies had found significant moderators that played a part in the relationship between initiating structure leader behavior and subordinate outcomes. For example, when a task was ambiguous, the relationship between leader initiating structure and subordinate satisfaction was stronger than if the task was clear. These findings made it apparent that there were variables that affected the relationship between leader behavior and subordinate outcomes, making the relationship stronger or weaker.

In 1973, Kerr was the first to coin substitutes for leadership as elements in the work setting that lessened leader effectiveness on subordinate outcomes. Further publications led to Kerr and Jermier's 1978 paper, which unveiled substitutes for leadership theory. This paper presented two types of elements in the job environment: substitutes and neutralizers. These elements were proposed to serve as moderators in the relationship between leader behavior and subordinate outcomes.

The theory originally classified substitutes as characteristics of the subordinate, characteristics of the task, and characteristics of the organization. Howell, Dorfman, & Kerr proposed alteration to the theory in terms of subordinate classification. They argued that moderators should be grouped based on their effect on the criterion. The original theory had already proposed moderators that act as substitutes and moderators that act as neutralizers. Howell and colleagues added enhancers to these.

Substitutes for leadership theory was a heavily researched area until the late 1980s when transformational leadership became the focus of the majority of leadership research.

== Definitions ==
=== Substitutes for leadership theory ===
Substitutes for leadership theory states that different situational factors can enhance, neutralize, or substitute for leader behaviors (Den Hartog & Koopman, 2001).

=== Substitutes ===
Substitutes are variables that make leadership unnecessary for subordinates and reduce the extent to which subordinates rely on their leader

==== Examples of substitutes ====
- Characteristics of the subordinate
  - Subordinate ability
  - Subordinate's professional orientation
- Characteristics of the task
  - Unambiguous and routine task (when all subordinates are performing menial labor, there is little role leadership can play; Den Hartog & Koopman, 2001)
  - Task that provides its own feedback as to how well the task is being done
  - Task that is intrinsically satisfying
- Characteristics of the organization
  - Cohesive work groups (a tight-knit group of employees has less need for a leader; Den Hartog & Koopman, 2001)
  - Organizational formulation (clear job goals that are written down, performance appraisals that are written down; Kerr and Jermier, 1987)
  - Self-managed work teams (employees rely on each other, not their leader)

=== Enhancers ===
Enhancers are variables that serve to strengthen leaders influence on subordinate outcomes (Den Hartog & Koopman, 2001

==== Examples of enhancers ====
- Characteristics of the subordinate
  - Subordinates having experience (those more experienced will be able to translate even the most ambiguous instructions into results
- Characteristics of the task
  - Task is non-routine
- Characteristics of the organization
  - Having group norms that encourage cooperation with leaders (Den Hartog & Koopman, 2001)
  - Leader having the ability to reward subordinates

=== Neutralizers ===
Neutralizers are variables which serve to weaken, or block leader influence on subordinate outcomes (Den Hartog & Koopman, 2001

==== Examples of neutralizers ====
- Characteristics of the subordinate
  - Subordinates are indifferent when it comes to rewards
- Characteristics of the organization
  - Whether or not subordinates are rewarded is not the leader's decision
- Kerr & Jermier never specified an example of a task characteristic that acts as a neutralizer.

== Scales used to measure ==
=== Kerr and Jermier ===
The original scale to measure the effects of various substitutes was developed by Kerr and Jermier. They assessed leadership substitutes via a questionnaire that contained thirteen subscales with a total of 55 items. The items were on a Likert scale ranging from 1 (almost always untrue or completely untrue), to 5 (almost always true or almost completely true).

The subscales included were:

1. Ability, experience, training, and knowledge
2. Professional orientation
3. Indifference towards organizational rewards
4. Unambiguous, routine, and methodically invariant tasks
5. Task-provided feedback concerning accomplishment
6. Intrinsically satisfying tasks
7. Organizational formalization
8. Organizational inflexibility
9. Advisory and staff functions
10. Close-knit, cohesive, interdependent work groups
11. Organizational rewards not within the leader's control
12. Spatial distance between superior and subordinates
13. Subordinate need for independence

Kerr and Jermier tested nine of these subscales in a lab setting and found that they were independent and had adequate internal reliabilities. They claim that the subscales produce easily interpretable data that describe the extent to which substitutes for leadership are present or absent in a given work situation. They went on to test their subscales in a field setting using police officers and concluded that the subscales met acceptable standards of reliability, and can be used to assess the validity of the substitutes for leadership construct in future studies.

=== Podsakoff, Niehoff, MacKenzie, and Williams ===
Podsakoff, Niehoff, MacKenzie, and Williams noted that studies testing the substitutes for leadership model had not been fully supportive of the theory, and believed that one reason for this may be that the quality of the scale developed by Kerr and Jermier to measure the substitutes constructs may be to blame. In response to this, they designed their own 74-item measure of substitutes for leadership. To test their scale, they administered it to 372 business students. Their analyses of the psychometric properties of the revised measure revealed their scale to be superior to Kerr and Jermier's scale, as evidenced by better dimensionality and reliability of the revised scale.

== Consequences ==
Kerr and Jermier proposed that substitute variables should render leader behaviors unable to predict subordinate outcomes. Researchers that have tested this characteristic of substitutes have found mixed results.

A study involving hospital personnel found that tasks that gave feedback regarding performance were negatively correlated with job satisfaction. Routine repetitive work tasks were correlated with organizational commitment. Intrinsically satisfying work, organizational formulation, and cohesive workgroups were substitutes that were significantly correlated with both job satisfaction and organizational commitment. However, they found little evidence that substitutes prevented or replaced a leader's effect on subordinate job satisfaction or organizational commitment. The only substitute that served as a replacement was the organizational formulation, which replaced leader behavior's predictive power in explaining subordinate job satisfaction and organizational commitment.

Another study looked at 1,235 employees working for 265 leaders in a variety of job settings. Among their findings were that intrinsically satisfying tasks were positively related to subordinate satisfaction, indifference to rewards was negatively related to organizational commitment, and the organizational formulation was negatively related to subordinate perceptions of role ambiguity. The researchers in this study concluded that substitutes for leadership were useful in predicting subordinate outcomes, but leader behaviors and substitutes should always be studied together because together they explained about a third of the total variance insubordinate outcomes in their sample.

A more recent study conducted by Dionne and colleagues collected data from 940 subordinates. Unsatisfied with the fact that prior studies had tested substitutes, enhancers, and neutralizers as moderators, they tested the effect of substitutes as mediators as well as moderators. Testing a variety of different substitutes and outcomes, the researchers found only very weak evidence that substitutes make a difference and concluded that leader behaviors are the only important variable in predicting employee outcomes.

Podsakoff, MacKenzie, and Bommer conducted a meta-analysis in which they took the results of 22 studies that examined the main effect of substitutes for leadership on the relationship between leader behaviors and subordinate outcomes. They found evidence supporting the theory taking into account both leader behaviors and the effect of substitutes accounted for more of the variance in subordinate outcomes than taking into account leader behaviors alone.

== Applications ==
=== Autonomous work groups ===
Bass (1990) suggested that autonomous work groups can substitute for formal leadership. In this scenario, employees are divided into groups that are responsible for managing their own day-to-day work (i.e. collective control over the pace, distribution of tasks, organization of breaks, recruitment, and training; Gulowsen, 1972). A quasi-experiment found that implementing autonomous workgroups of 8 to 12 shop-floor employees in a manufacturing setting positively affected both the intrinsic and extrinsic job satisfaction of employees while obviating some supervisory positions.

=== Self-management ===
Self-management is defined by Thoresen and Mahoney (1974) as occurring when an individual behaves in a way he would not normally behave, and there are no external forces dictating that the person maintains that behavior. Self-management requires self-observation (e.g., keeping a log of what one has discussed with others on the phone), specification of goals (e.g., being responsible for setting one's own schedule and priorities), cueing strategies (e.g., putting a checkout board by the exit to remind an employee to let their secretary know where they are going and when they expect to return), rehearsal (e.g., recording one's presentation to clients and making corrections as needed), self-evaluation (e.g., using a chart to keep track of work quality and quantity), and self-reinforcement (accomplished by building intrinsic rewards for the performance of tasks; Bass, 1990; Manz & Sims 1980). These strategies can be understood as being substitutes for leadership. Instead of requiring that a supervisor monitor a subordinate's progress on a work task, a subordinate can self-manage by utilizing one of the strategies listed above. This makes the supervisor's guidance unnecessary for the subordinate.

== Criticisms and methodological problems with research ==
=== Common-source bias ===
Dionne and colleagues argued that significant effects of substitutes found in prior studies may be a statistical artifact due to common-source bias, or bias occurring when independent and dependent variables are collected from the same person or group of people. In a study sampling 49 organizations, Dionne and colleagues controlled for the effect of common-source bias and found no moderating or mediating effects of substitutes on the relationship between leader behavior and group effectiveness.

In a study by Podsakoff and Mackenzie, the predictor variables, as well as the job attitude and role perception variables, were both taken from individual employees, while the performance measures were taken from supervisors. They found that their predictors accounted for a higher proportion of variance in job attitudes and role perceptions than in employee performance. They posit the reason for this was that their predictors shared a common source with the job attitudes and role perception criterion measures, but not with the employee performance criterion measures. They suggested that common-source bias may not be the only reason for this, but that it should be controlled in future research.

=== Lack of longitudinal studies ===
Keller conducted a longitudinal study in which he pointed out that the vast majority of studies conducted on substitutes for leadership theory are cross-sectional in nature, making it more difficult to discern a causal relationship between substitutes and their effects on employee performance. Cross-sectional research is focused on finding relationships between variables at a specific point in time, whereas longitudinal studies involve taking multiple measures over a longer period of time. Keller's longitudinal study of the effect of substitutes on Research & Development teams found that two of the seven substitutes (ability and intrinsic satisfaction) affected team performance over time.

=== Conceptual weakness ===
Yukl (1998) pointed out that it is hard to identify specific substitutes and neutralizers for broad behavior categories, and that an improvement on the theory would be to use more specific behaviors in place of "supportive and instrumental leadership behaviors." Yukl said that recent studies testing the theory have used specific behaviors (e.g., contingent reward behavior and role clarification), however, the development of the theory does not reflect these developments.

== Closely related constructs ==
=== Contingency model ===
The contingency model of leadership was developed by Fred Fiedler in the 1960s after Fiedler spent 12 years collecting data from over 800 groups of employees. This model predicts that the most effective method of leadership will vary depending on the situation. A study that supported the model was one Fiedler did with 48 petty officers and 240 recruiters at a Belgium naval training center (Fiedler, 1965). Fiedler found that a leader's fit with the group and the task was more important in predicting outcomes than the leader's characteristics. For example, controlling leaders went best with heterogeneous groups with low position power. (Fiedler, 1965). There are many different theories within the contingency paradigm, which differ on what situational factors change leadership effectiveness. The most influential theory within this model is the path-goal theory (Den Hartog & Koopman, 2001).

=== Path-goal theory ===
Proposed by Robert House in 1971, path-goal theory predicts that subordinates will be satisfied with their leader if they feel their leader's behavior will lead them to satisfaction. Also, subordinates will be motivated when they feel that their satisfaction depends on their performance and their leader acts in a way to help them reach goals (Den Hartog & Koopman, 2001, House, 1971). Path-goal theory predicts that when goals and the paths to those goals are clear, subordinates may not need leader guidance (Kerr & Jermier, 1978).

== See also ==
- Leadership
- Industrial and organizational psychology
- Path–goal theory
- Contingency Model
- Fiedler contingency model
- Bass, B. M. (1990). Bass & Stogdill's handbook of leadership: Theory, research, and managerial applications (3rd ed.). New York, NY: Free Press.
- Den Hartog, D. N., & Koopman, P. L. (2002). Leadership in organizations. In N. Anderson, D. S. Ones, H. K. Sinangil, & C. Viswesvaran (Eds.), Handbook of industrial, work and organizational psychology, Volume 2: Organizational psychology (166-187). Thousand Oaks, CA: Sage Publications, Inc.
- Fiedler, E. (1965). A contingency model of leadership effectiveness. In H. Proshansky, & B. Seidenberg (Eds.), Basic studies in social psychology (538-551). New York, NY: Holt, Rinehart, and Winston.
- Gulowsen, J. (1972). A measure of work group autonomy. In L. E. Davis, & J. C. Taylor (Eds.), Design of jobs (374-390). Harmondsworth, UK: Penguin.
- House, R. J. (1971). A path-goal theory of leader effectiveness. Administrative Science Quarterly, 16, 321-338.
- Manz, C. C., & Sims, H. P. (1992). The potential for "groupthink" in autonomous work groups. In R. Glaser (Ed.), Classic readings in self-managing teamwork: 20 of the most important articles (401-411). King of Prussia, PA: Organization Design and Development.
- Thoreson, C. E., & Mahoney, M. J. (1974). Behavioral self-control. New York, NY: Holt, Rinehart, & Winston.
- Yukl, G. (1998). Leadership in organizations (4th ed.). Upper Saddle River, NJ: Prentice Hall.
