= Cognitive resource theory =

Leadership theory in industrial and organizational psychology

Cognitive resource theory (CRT) is a leadership theory of industrial and organisational psychology developed by Fred Fiedler and Joe Garcia in 1987 as a reconceptualisation of the Fiedler contingency model. The theory focuses on the influence of the leader's intelligence and experience on their reaction to stress.

The essence of the theory is that stress is the enemy of rationality, damaging leaders' ability to think logically and analytically. However, the leader's experience and intelligence can lessen the influence of stress on his or her actions: intelligence is the main factor in low-stress situations, while experience counts for more during high-stress moments.

Originating from studies into military leadership style, CRT can also be applied to other contexts such as the relationship between stress and ability in sport. The theory proposes the style of leadership required in certain situations, depending on the degree of stress, situational control and task structure. Training should focus on stress management so that a leader's intellect can be most effectively utilised and also to train leaders to take a directive approach when their knowledge will benefit the group but a less directive approach when group member abilities will contribute to performance.

== Fiedler contingency model ==
Research into leadership performance and the effectiveness of training programmes found no effect of years of experience on performance. To understand the effect of different leaders on performance in an organisation, Fielder developed the contingency model. The model highlights the importance of leadership style and the degree to which this is matched to the situation. Contrast between task-orientated leaders and relationship-orientated leaders judged by the Least Preferred Coworker (LPC) scale. Either leadership style can be effective depending on the situation so no ideal leader is theorised but performance can be improved by altering the situation to meet the style of leadership. The second factor of the theory is how well the leader can control the group and ensure their instructions are carried out. However this theory was criticised for its lack of flexibility and over the accuracy of the LPC scale. Fiedler then went on to develop the CRT which takes into account the personality of the leader, degree of situational stress and group-leader relations.

== Cognitive resource theory ==
The cognitive resources of a leader refers to their experience, intelligence, competence, and task-relevant knowledge.

Blades undertook studies in army mess halls, investigating the effect of group member and leader intelligence on overall organisational performance. The effect of intelligence on performance was influenced by how directive the leader was and both the leader's and members' motivation. He concluded that a leader's knowledge can only contribute to performance if it is efficiently communicated, hence requiring a directive leader and also a compliant group that is willing to undertake the commands of the leader. A further study on military cadets measuring levels of interpersonal stress and intelligence showed intelligence to be impaired under conditions of stress.

== Predictions ==
1. A leader's cognitive ability contributes to the performance of the team only when the leader's approach is directive. When leaders are better at planning and decision-making, in order for their plans and decisions to be implemented, they need to tell people what to do, rather than hope they agree with them. When they are not better than people on the team, then a non-directive approach is more appropriate, for example where they facilitate an open discussion where the ideas of team can be aired and the best approach identified and implemented.
2. Stress affects the relationship between intelligence and decision quality. When there is low stress, then intelligence is fully functional and makes an optimal contribution. However, during high stress, a natural intelligence not only makes no difference, but it may also have a negative effect. One reason for this may be that an intelligent person seeks rational solutions, which may not be available (and may be one of the causes of stress). In such situations, a leader who is inexperienced in 'gut feel' decisions is forced to rely on this unfamiliar approach. Another possibility is that the leader retreats within him/herself, to think hard about the problem, leaving the group to their own devices. In situations of stress cognitive abilities are not task-orientated but focus on task irrelevant features caused by stress of the situation or of their superior.
3. Leader's abilities contribute to group performance only under conditions where the group favors the leader and is supportive of the leader and their goals. In situations where the group members are supportive, the leader's commands can therefore be implemented
4. Leader's intelligence correlates with performance to the degree that the task is intellectually demanding. Intellectual abilities can only be utilised efficiently in difficult, cognitively demanding tasks.

Therefore, the leader's abilities and intelligence only aid organisational success when they are directive, in a stress free situation, the organisations' members are supportive and the task requires high intellect.

== The role of experience ==
In high stress conditions, experience is a more influencing factor on performance than intelligence as experience leads to perceiving the situation as more structured and less complex. A high level of intellect leads to cognitive complexity thereby perception of greater task complexity and the leader views many alternative solutions, resulting in greater stress. The extent to which a leader has situational control judged by their perception of task structure and their position of power defines how certain they think the task will be accomplished. Situational control is a key concept in both the contingency model and in CRT. The contingency model predicts that task-motivated leaders (low LPC score) perform most efficiently in situations of high control whereas relationship orientated leaders (high LPC score) perform best in moderately or low structured tasks.
