= Coaching: The Secret Code to Uncommon Leadership =

2021 business book by Ruchira Chaudhary

- Author: Ruchira Chaudhary
- Language: English
- Subject: Leadership; Executive coaching Management
- Genre: Non-fiction
- Publisher: Penguin Random House India, and SEA
- Publication date: January 2021
- Publication place: India
- Media type: Print
- Pages: 356
- ISBN: 978-0-670-09282-6

Coaching: The Secret Code to Uncommon Leadership is a 2021 business book by Ruchira Chaudhary about leadership development through coaching.

== Synopsis ==
Chaudhary wrote the book for a business environment defined by volatility, uncertainty, complexity, and ambiguity. Her argument is that organizations now need leaders who guide and support rather than instruct and control, and she puts coaching at the heart of what she calls "uncommon leadership," drawing examples from business, sport, and the performing arts.

The central framework is the 4C+ Model, which sets out four coaching outcomes: Capability, Consciousness, Confidence, and Clarity. These sit on a fifth, foundational element like culture. The "+" stands for that cultural foundation, a coaching mindset embedded across the organization, without which the four Cs cannot take root. Capability is about helping people unlock their potential and think laterally. Consciousness is about self-awareness and understanding one's impact on others. Confidence is the self-belief needed to act and take risks. Clarity is about giving direction, organizing thinking, and supporting decision making.

The book also lays out a coaching styles framework that treats coaching as a situational leadership practice, with leaders adapting their approach to context and individual needs. Chaudhary later adapted the framework and its underlying research for Harvard Business Review.

== Reception ==
In Business Standard, R. Gopalakrishnan called the book "highly readable" noting that while it "could have been crisper", its anecdotal approach sustains reader engagement. He also emphasized the book's argument that coaching should be the responsibility of operating managers rather than being confined to HR functions.

In The Hindu BusinessLine, Priya Ramesh wrote that the book makes "a very strong case" for integrating coaching into leadership and employee development. The book emphasizes on curiosity, trust, and organization-wide capability building.

In BW Businessworld, Ruhail Amin described the book as "a deep dive into leadership strategies" and praised its practical guidance on building a coaching culture within organizations.
