= James D. Thompson =

American sociologist (1920–1973)

- Born: January 11, 1920; Indianapolis, Indiana, USA
- Died: September 1, 1973 (aged 53); Nashville, Tennessee, USA

Academic background
- Education: Indiana University; University of North Carolina at Chapel Hill

James David Thompson (January 11, 1920 – September 1, 1973) was an American sociologist and organization theorist.

== Education and career ==
In 1932, Thompson's family moved to Chicago where he went to a public high school. He graduated from Indiana University with a B.A. in business and served in the United States Air Force from 1941 to 1946. He obtained a master's degree in journalism and worked half a year as an editor for the Chicago Journal of Commerce before taking a position as a journalism teacher at the University of Wisconsin–Madison. From 1950 to 1954, he worked on his final degree, a Ph.D. in sociology from the University of North Carolina at Chapel Hill.

From there, he moved to Cornell University to teach at the School of Business and Public Administration. At Cornell, he founded the Administrative Science Quarterly along with Edward Litchfield, a colleague and then dean of the School. Thompson became the first editor of the journal in 1956. He became the director of the Administrative Science Center at the University of Pittsburgh. In 1967, he published Organizations in Action: Social Science Bases of Administrative Theory, one of the most influential books on organizations.

Thompson moved one last time in 1968 to teach at the Department of Sociology at Vanderbilt University. He was diagnosed with cancer in 1972 and died September 11, 1973.

== Research ==
=== Typology of Decision Making ===
In 1959, Thompson and Tuden, both working at the University of Pittsburgh, identified four types of decision-making patterns in organizations.

1. Where both preferences and cause/effect relations are clear, decision making is "computational". These decisions are often short term and information about the decision is fairly unambiguous.
2. Where outcome preferences are clear, but cause/effect relations are uncertain, Thompson suggest that "judgment" takes over and you make your best educated guess. These decisions are based on prior experience and are often qualitative in nature.
3. When the situation is reversed, and preferences are uncertain, then you rely on compromise between different groups. Political coalitions may be built which rely on negotiating and bargaining.
4. When neither preferences nor cause/effect relations are clear, then you rely on "inspirational" leadership. This is where the charismatic leader may step in and this type of decision often takes place in times of crisis.

=== Organizations in Action ===
Organizations in Action was published in 1967. The book is still today a classic multidisciplinary study of the behavior of complex organizations as entities. The book considers individuals behavior only in the extent that it helps explain the nature of organizations. Thompson offers 95 distinct propositions about the behavior of organizations, all relevant regardless of the culture in which they are found. A central topic in the book is that organizations must meet and handle uncertainty. He classifies organizations according to their technologies and environments. Thompson saw technology as a dimension in understanding the actions of complex organization. Thompson recognized the benefit for managers of using a typology of technology that could be general enough to deal with a different range of technologies found in complex organizations.

A number of theoretical perspectives have developed subsequent to Thompson's work, most notably, organizational ecology and institutional theory.

== Bibliography ==
- Thompson, James D.; Hammond, Peter B.; Hawkes, Robert W.; Junker, Buford H.; Tuden, Arthur, eds. (1959). Comparative Studies in Administration. University of Pittsburgh Press. doi:10.2307/jj.6338492. ISBN 978-0-8229-7518-2.
- Thompson, James D.; Buck, Vernon E., eds. (1966). Approaches to organizational design. University of Pittsburgh Press.
- Thompson, James D. (2003) [1967]. Organizations in Action: Social Science Bases of Administrative Theory (With a new preface by Mayer N. Zald and a new introduction by W. Richard Scott ed.). New Brunswick, New Jersey: Transaction Publishers. ISBN 0-7658-0991-5.
- Thompson, James David; van Houten, Donald R. (1970). The behavioral Sciences: An interpretation. Addison-Wesley.
- Thompson, James D. (1976). Organizations and Beyond: Selected Essays of James D. Thompson. Lexington Books. ISBN 978-0-669-00246-1.
