= Path–goal theory =

Leadership theory

The path–goal theory, also known as the path–goal theory of leader effectiveness or the path–goal model, is a leadership theory developed by Robert House, an Ohio State University graduate, in 1971 and revised in 1996. The theory states that a leader's behavior is contingent to the satisfaction, motivation and performance of his or her subordinates. The revised version also argues that the leader engages in behaviors that complement subordinate's abilities and compensate for deficiencies. According to Robert House and John Antonakis, the task-oriented elements of the path–goal model can be classified as a form of instrumental leadership.

== Origins ==
The first theory was inspired by the work of Martin G. Evans (1970), in which the leadership behaviors and the follower perceptions of the degree to which following a particular behavior (path) will lead to a particular outcome (goal). The path–goal theory was also influenced by the expectancy theory of motivation developed by Victor Vroom in 1964. Vroom built his work on the work of Georgopoulos et al. (1957): A path-goal approach to productivity. Journal of Applied Psychology. Volume 41, No. 6, pages 345–353.

== Original theory ==
According to the first of all theory, the manager's job is viewed as guiding workers to choose the best paths to reach their goals, as well as the organizational goals. The theory argues that leaders will have to engage in different types of leadership behavior depending on the nature and the demands of a particular situation. It is the leader's job to assist followers in attaining goals and to provide the direction and support needed to ensure that their goals are compatible with the organization's goals.

A leader's behavior is acceptable to subordinates when viewed as a source of satisfaction, and motivational when need satisfaction is contingent on performance, and the leader facilitates, coaches, and rewards effective performance. The original path-goal theory identifies achievement-oriented, directive, participative, and supportive leader behaviors:

- The directive path-goal clarifying leader behavior refers to situations where the leader lets followers know what is expected of them and tells them how to perform their tasks. The theory argues that this behavior has the most positive effect when the subordinates' role and task demands are ambiguous and intrinsically satisfying.
- The achievement-oriented leader behavior refers to situations where the leader sets challenging goals for followers, expects them to perform at their highest level, and shows confidence in their ability to meet this expectation. Occupations in which the achievement motive were most predominant were technical jobs, sales persons, scientists, engineers, and entrepreneurs.
- The participative leader behavior involves leaders consulting with followers and asking for their suggestions before making a decision. This behavior is predominant when subordinates are highly personally involved in their work.
- The supportive leader behavior is directed towards the satisfaction of subordinates needs and preferences. The leader shows concern for the followers' psychological well being. This behavior is especially needed in situations in which tasks or relationships are psychologically or physically distressing.

Path–goal theory assumes that leaders are flexible and that they can change their style, as situations require. The theory proposes two contingency variables, such as environment and follower characteristics, that moderate the leader behavior-outcome relationship. Environment is outside the control of the follower-task structure, authority system, and work group. Environmental factors determine the type of leader behavior required if the follower outcomes are to be maximized. Follower characteristics are the locus of control, experience, and perceived ability. Personal characteristics of subordinates determine how the environment and leader are interpreted. Effective leaders clarify the path to help their followers achieve goals and make the journey easier by reducing roadblocks and pitfalls. Research demonstrates that employee performance and satisfaction are positively influenced when the leader compensates for the shortcomings in either the employee or the work setting. According to Northouse, the theory is useful because it reminds leaders that their central purpose as a leader is to help subordinates define and reach their goals in an efficient manner.

== In college athletics ==
House (1971) refers to Rizzo (1970), stating that a leader initiating structure increases the path instrumentality for subordinates by decreasing role ambiguity. Also, he says that a leader who is initiating structure and consideration will have different effects depending on whether the task is satisfying or unsatisfying to the subordinate and whether the task-role demands are clear or ambiguous. This means that the more satisfying the task, the less positive the relationship is between consideration and subordinate satisfaction and performance – meaning people tend to act and enjoy it without considering whether they should not. Also, it means that when a coach is clear in setting goals and expectations, the goals are more likely to be achieved than if the goals and expectations are unclear. This is good for coaches, it means that when they can present a goal that is most satisfying to athletes, it is more likely for the athletes to have affective desire for achieving the goal.

For a college coach, practicing good ethics in this regard means creating goals that are within reach for a team, and working together with members of a team when creating these goals. Larson and LaFasto in their 1989 book "TeamWork" place a clear & elevating goal at the forefront of the necessary components for a successful team. "The image of a desired state of affairs that inspires action" is how Garfield defines a clear goal, according to the authors (p. 27). They say that when the goal is "unfocused and "politicized", it becomes a reason for ineffective team functioning. "A sense of mission" is a clear characteristic of peak performers', says Garfield, according to the authors. Larson and LaFasto make no mistake in emphasizing the importance of clarity. "Elevating" to the authors means "personally challenging" (p. 31). A player asks the personal question of how worthwhile the goal itself is, and what type of difference it makes. The elevating factor of goal setting brings about a sense of urgency, causes a team to lose track of time (relates to the idea of "flow" in the field of positive psychology), and causes the rate of communication to increase, for example, players calling one another in the evening, outside the sport context, to talk about today's practice or tomorrow's game.

== See also ==
- Leadership
- Leader–member exchange theory
- Substitutes for Leadership Theory
