= Fiedler contingency model =

Business and management theory

The contingency model by business and management psychologist Fred Fiedler is a contingency theory concerned with the effectiveness of a leader in an organization.

== Premises ==
The most common situational theory was developed by Fred Fiedler. Fiedler believed that an individual's leadership style is the result of their experiences throughout the lifespan and is therefore extremely difficult to change. Fiedler argued that one should concentrate on helping people understand their particular leadership style and how to match that style to the particular situation rather than teaching people a particular leadership style. Fiedler developed the least preferred coworker (LPC) scale in order to help one understand one's specific leadership style. According to Fiedler, because leadership behavior is fixed, effectiveness can only be improved by restructuring tasks or changing the amount of power the leader had over organizational factors (such as salary, disciplinary action, and promotions).

Fiedler's model does have some weaknesses. For example, some leaders may be more effective in certain situations than others. The LPC scale can be questioned because the assessment is performed by one individual on another.

The theory holds that the effectiveness of a task group or of an organization depends on two main factors: the personality of the leader and the degree to which the situation gives the leader power, control, and influence over the situation or, conversely, the degree to which the situation confronts the leader with uncertainty.

To Fiedler, stress is a key determinant of leader effectiveness, and a distinction is made between stress related to the leader's superior and stress related to subordinates or the situation itself. In stressful situations, leaders dwell on the stressful relations with others and cannot focus their intellectual abilities on the job. Thus, intelligence is more effective and used more often in stress-free situations. Fiedler concludes that experience impairs performance in low-stress conditions but contributes to performance under high-stress conditions. As with other situational factors, for stressful situations Fiedler recommends altering or engineering the leadership situation to capitalize on the leader's strengths.

Fiedler's situational contingency theory holds that group effectiveness depends on an appropriate match between a leader's style (essentially a trait measure) and the demands of the situation. In other words, effective leadership is contingent on matching leader's style to the right setting. Fiedler considers situational control the extent to which a leader can determine what their group is going to do to be the primary contingency factor in determining the effectiveness of leader behavior.

Fiedler's contingency model is a dynamic model where the personal characteristics and motivation of the leader are said to interact with the current situation that the group faces. Thus, the contingency model marks a shift away from the tendency to attribute leadership effectiveness to personality alone.

== Least preferred coworker (LPC) ==
The leadership style of the leader is thus fixed and measured by what Fiedler calls the least preferred coworker (LPC) scale, an instrument for measuring an individual's leadership orientation. The LPC scale asks a leader to think of all the people with whom they have ever worked and then describe the person with whom they have worked least well, using a series of bipolar scales of 1 to 8, such as the following:

Unfriendly	1 2 3 4 5 6 7 8	Friendly
Uncooperative	1 2 3 4 5 6 7 8	Cooperative
Hostile	1 2 3 4 5 6 7 8	Supportive
....	1 2 3 4 5 6 7 8	....
Guarded	1 2 3 4 5 6 7 8	Open

A high LPC score suggests that the leader has a "human relations orientation," while a low LPC score indicates a "task orientation." Fiedler assumes that everybody's least preferred coworker in fact is, on average, about equally unpleasant, but people who are relationship-motivated tend to describe their least preferred coworkers in a more positive manner, e.g., more pleasant and more efficient. Therefore, they receive higher LPC scores. People who are task-motivated, on the other hand, tend to rate their least preferred coworkers in a more negative manner. Therefore, they receive lower LPC scores. So, the least preferred coworker scale is actually not about the least preferred worker at all; instead, it is about the person who takes the test and that person's motivation type. This is because individuals who rate their least preferred coworker in relatively favorable light on these scales derive satisfaction out of interpersonal relationships, and those who rate the coworker in a relatively unfavorable light get satisfaction out of successful task performance. This method reveals an individual's emotional reaction to people they cannot work with.

Fiedler expanded his studies outside of the lab and showed the interrelations between adjustment, group performance, and leadership style in a volunteer medical team under different conditions of stress while working in isolated villages of Central America. The task-oriented leader performed better in situations that were favorable and relatively unfavorable while the relationship-oriented leader only fared better in situations of intermediate favorableness. As the LPC is a personality measure, the score is believed to be quite stable over time and not easily changed. Low LPCs tend to remain low and high LPCs tend to remain high, which shows that the test-reliability of the LPC is strong.

== Situational favorability ==
According to Fiedler, the ability to control the group situation (the second component of the contingency model) is crucial for a leader. This is because only leaders with situational control can be confident that their orders and suggestions will be carried out by their followers. Leaders who are unable to assume control over the group situation cannot be sure that the members they are leading will execute their commands. Because situational control is critical to leadership efficacy, Fiedler broke this factor down into three major components: leader–member relations, task structure, and position power. Moreover, there is no ideal leader. Both low-LPC (task-oriented) and high-LPC (relationship-oriented) leaders can be effective if their leadership orientation fits the situation. The contingency theory allows for predicting the characteristics of the appropriate situations for effectiveness. Three situational components determine the favourableness of situational control:

Situational Leadership Styles
Situation	Leader–Member Relations	Task Structure	Leader Position Power
1	Good	Structured	Strong
2	Good	Structured	Weak
3	Good	Unstructured	Strong
4	Good	Unstructured	Weak
5	Poor	Structured	Strong
6	Poor	Structured	Weak
7	Poor	Unstructured	Strong
8	Poor	Unstructured	Weak

1. Leader–Member Relations, referring to the degree of mutual trust, respect, and confidence between the leader and the subordinates. When leader–member relations in the group are poor, the leader has to shift focus away from the group task in order to regulate behavior and conflict within the group.
2. Task Structure, referring to the extent to which group tasks are clear and structured. When task structure is low (unstructured), group tasks are ambiguous, with no clear solution or correct approach to complete the goal. In contrast, when task structure is high (structured), the group goal is clear, unambiguous and straightforward: members have a clear idea about the how to approach and reach the goal.
3. Leader Position Power, referring to the power inherent in the leader's position itself.

The basic findings of the Contingency Model are that task-motivated leaders perform generally best in very "favorable" situations, that is, either under conditions in which their power, control, and influence are very high (or, conversely, where uncertainty is very low) or where the situation is unfavorable, where they have low power, control, and influence. Relationship-motivated leaders tend to perform best in situations in which they have moderate power, control, and influence. Both the relationship and the task-motivated leaders perform well under some situations but not under others. It is not accurate to speak of a "good" or a "poor" leader; rather, a leader may perform well in one type of situation but not in another. Outstanding directors of research teams do not necessarily make good production foremen or military leaders, and outstanding battle field commanders, like United States Army General George S. Patton, do not necessarily make good chiefs of staff or good chairmen of volunteer school picnic committees.

When there is a good leader–member relation, a highly structured task, and high leader position power, the situation is considered a "favorable situation." Fiedler found that low-LPC leaders are more effective in extremely favorable or unfavorable situations, whereas high-LPC leaders perform best in situations with intermediate favorability. Leaders in high positions of power have the ability to distribute resources among their members, meaning they can reward and punish their followers. Leaders in low positions of power cannot control resources to the same extent as leaders in high power and so lack the same degree of situational control. For example, the CEO of a business has high position power, because she is able to increase and reduce the salary that her employees receive. On the other hand, an office worker in this same business has low position power, because although they may be the leader on a new business deal, they cannot control the situation by rewarding or disciplining their colleagues with salary changes.

== Leader–situation match and mismatch ==
Since personality is relatively stable though it can be changed, the contingency model suggests that improving effectiveness requires changing the situation to fit the leader. This is called "job engineering" or "job restructuring". The organization or the leader may increase or decrease task structure and position power; also, training and group development may improve leader–member relations. In his 1976 book Improving Leadership Effectiveness: The Leader Match Concept, Fiedler (with Martin Chemers and Linda Mahar) offers a self paced leadership training program designed to help leaders alter the favorableness of the situation, or situational control. The advantage of contingency theory is that it “does not require that people be effective in all situations”. According to Northouse, although one person may be successful in one role, they may not be successful in another based on the environment.

One implication of "job engineering" or "job restructuring" through additional training is that if all leaders are given the same training regardless of their position in the contingency model, it could create a mismatch between the leader and situation. "The right person for a particular job today may be the wrong person in six months or in one or two years." For example, if a company has a workshop for all managers that effectively changed the task structure from low to high, it might seem good for the company at first glance, but leaders who were effective in a low task structure situation could become very ineffective in a situation with a high task structure.

=== Examples ===
- A company that might be hiring a new manager to take on a leadership position that has poor current leader–member relations and high task structure and authority, the company would be best positioned to fill this role with a high LPC or leader–member relations to improve poor relations. Hiring someone who is more relation-oriented will help rebuild those the poor current leader–member relations.
- Task-oriented leadership would be advisable in a natural disaster, like a flood or fire. In an uncertain situation the leader–member relations are usually poor, the task is unstructured, and the position power is weak. The one who emerges as a leader to direct the group's activity usually does not know subordinates personally. The task-oriented leader who gets things accomplished proves to be the most successful. If the leader is considerate (relationship-oriented), they may waste so much time in the disaster that things get out of control and lives are lost.
- Blue-collar workers generally want to know exactly what they are supposed to do. Therefore, their work environment is usually highly structured. The leader's position power is strong if management backs their decision. Finally, even though the leader may not be relationship-oriented, leader–member relations may be extremely strong if they can gain promotions and salary increases for subordinates. Under these situations the task-oriented style of leadership is preferred over the (considerate) relationship-oriented style.
- The considerate (relationship-oriented) style of leadership can be appropriate in an environment where the situation is moderately favorable or certain, for example, when (1) leader–member relations are good, (2) the task is structured, and (3) position power is either strong or weak. Situations like this exist with research scientists, who do not like superiors to structure the task for them. They prefer to follow their own creative leads in order to solve problems. In a situation like this a considerate style of leadership is preferred over the task-oriented.
- The last example of a task-oriented leader is one that is in charge of large products. They have to oversee all of the operations and make decisions on behalf of the entire project. They have many tasks and goals to be set.

== Opposing views ==
Researchers often find that Fiedler's contingency theory falls short on flexibility. They also note that LPC scores can fail to reflect the personality traits they are supposed to reflect.

Fiedler's contingency theory has drawn criticism because it implies that the only alternative for an unalterable mismatch of leader orientation and an unfavorable situation is changing the leader. The model's validity has also been disputed, despite many supportive tests. The contingency model does not take into account the percentage of "intermediate favorability" situations vs. "extremely favorable or unfavorable situations"; hence, it does not give a complete picture of the comparison between low-LPC leaders and high-LPC leaders.

Other criticisms concern the methodology of measuring leadership style through the LPC inventory and the nature of the supporting evidence. Fiedler and his associates have provided decades of research to support and refine the contingency theory.

== Cognitive resource theory ==
Cognitive resource theory (CRT) modifies Fiedler's basic contingency model by adding traits of the leader. CRT tries to identify the conditions under which leaders and group members will use their intellectual resources, skills, and knowledge effectively. While it has been generally assumed that more intelligent and more experienced leaders will perform better than those with less intelligence and experience, this assumption is not supported by Fiedler's research.

== See also ==
- Leadership – Quality of an individual or group influencing or guiding others
- Trait leadership – Patterns of personal characteristics that foster consistent leader effectiveness
- Substitutes for Leadership Theory
