= Robert R. Blake =

American management theoretician

Robert Rogers Blake (January 21, 1918 – June 20, 2004) was an American management theoretician. He did pioneer work in the field of organizational dynamics.

Together with Jane S. Mouton, he developed the Managerial Grid Model (1964), which attempts to conceptualize management in terms of relations and leadership style.

== See also ==
- Organizational behavior
