= Managerial grid model =

Behavioral leadership model

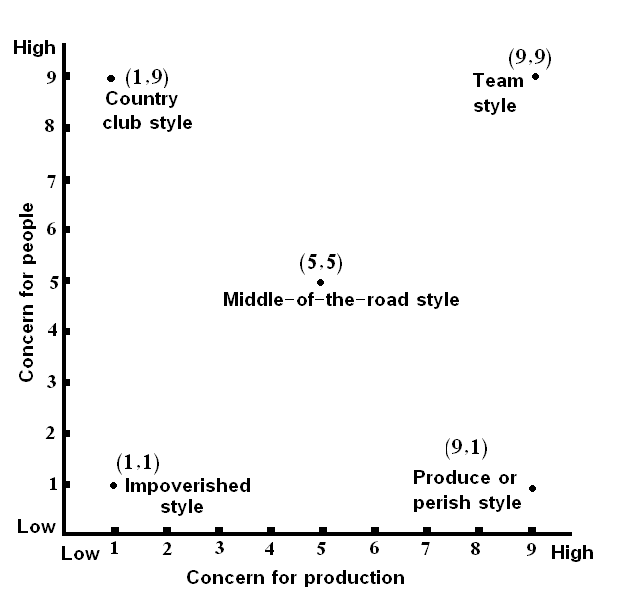
A graphical representation of the Managerial Grid

The managerial grid model or managerial grid theory (1964) is a model, developed by Robert R. Blake and Jane Mouton, of leadership styles.

This model originally identified five different leadership styles based on the concern for people and the concern for production.

The optimal leadership style in this model is based on Theory Y.

The grid theory has continued to evolve and develop. The theory was updated with two additional leadership styles and with a new element, resilience.

In 1999, the grid managerial seminar began using a new text, The Power to Change.

The model is represented as a grid with concern for production as the x-axis and concern for people as the y-axis; each axis ranges from 1 (Low) to 9 (High). The resulting leadership styles are as follows:

- The indifferent (previously called impoverished) style (1,1): evade and elude. In this style, managers have low concern for both people and production. Managers use this style to preserve job and job seniority, protecting themselves by avoiding getting into trouble. The main concern for the manager is not to be held responsible for any mistakes, which results in less innovative decisions.
- The accommodating (previously, country club) style (1,9): yield and comply. This style has a high concern for people and a low concern for production. Managers using this style pay much attention to the security and comfort of the employees, in hopes that this will increase performance. The resulting atmosphere is usually friendly, but not necessarily very productive.
- The dictatorial (previously, produce or perish) style (9,1): in return. Managers using this style pressure their employees through rules and punishments to achieve the company goals. This dictatorial style is based on Theory X of Douglas McGregor, and is commonly applied in companies on the edge of real or perceived failure. This style is often used in cases of crisis management.
- The status quo (previously, middle-of-the-road) style (5,5): balance and compromise. Managers using this style try to balance between company goals and workers' needs. By giving some concern to both people and production, managers who use this style hope to achieve suitable performance but doing so gives away a bit of each concern so that neither production nor people needs are met.
- The sound (previously, team) style (9,9): contribute and commit. In this style, high concern is paid both to people and production. As suggested by the propositions of Theory Y, managers choosing to use this style encourage teamwork and commitment among employees. This method relies heavily on making employees feel themselves to be constructive parts of the company.
- The opportunistic style: exploit and manipulate. Individuals using this style, which was added to the grid theory before 1999, do not have a fixed location on the grid. They adopt whichever behaviour offers the greatest personal benefit.
- The paternalistic style: prescribe and guide. This style was added to the grid theory before 1999. In The Power to Change, it was redefined to alternate between the (1,9) and (9,1) locations on the grid. Managers using this style praise and support, but discourage challenges to their thinking.

== Behavioral elements ==
Grid theory breaks behavior down into seven key elements:

Element	Description
Initiative	Taking action, driving and supporting
Inquiry	Questioning, researching and verifying understanding
Advocacy	Expressing convictions and championing ideas
Decision making	Evaluating resources, choices and consequences
Conflict resolution	Confronting and resolving disagreements
Resilience	Dealing with problems, setbacks and failures
Critique	Delivering objective, candid feedback

== See also ==
- Behavior modification
- Leadership
- Three levels of leadership model
