= Situational leadership theory =

Business model

The Situational Leadership Model is the idea that effective leaders adapt their style to each situation. No one style is appropriate for all situations. Leaders may use a different style in each situation, even when working with the same team, followers or employees.

Most models use two dimensions on which leaders can adapt their style:

- "Task Behavior": Whether the leader is giving more direction or giving more autonomy.
- "Relationship Behavior": Whether the leader is working closely with the follower or more at arm's length.

== Theory ==
The Situational Leadership Model was created by Dr. Paul Hersey and Dr. Ken Blanchard while working on the textbook, Management of Organizational Behavior. It was first introduced in 1969 as "Life Cycle Theory of Leadership". During the mid-1970s, Life Cycle Theory of Leadership was renamed "Situational Leadership."

In the late 1970s/ early 1980s, Hersey and Blanchard both developed their own slightly divergent versions of the Situational Leadership Theory: The Situational Leadership Model (Hersey) and the Situational Leadership II model (Blanchard et al.). In 2018, it was agreed that the Blanchard version of the model be trademarked as SLII and the Hersey version of the model to remain trademarked as Situational Leadership.

The fundamental principle of the Situational Leadership Model is that there is no single "best" style of leadership. Effective leadership is task-relevant, and the most successful leaders are those who adapt their leadership style to the Performance Readiness level (ability and willingness) of the individual or group they are attempting to lead or influence. Effective leadership varies, not only with the person or group that is being influenced, but it also depends on the task, job, or function that needs to be accomplished.

Several studies do not support all of the prescriptions offered by situational leadership theory.

== Leadership styles ==
Hersey and Blanchard characterized leadership style in terms of the amount of task behavior and relationship behavior that the leader provides to their followers. They categorized all leadership styles into four behavior styles based on combinations of either high or low task behavior and relationship behavior, which they named S1 to S4. The titles for three of these styles differ depending on which version of the model is used.

S4	S3	S2	S1
Delegating	Participating (Supporting)	Selling (Coaching)	Telling (Directing)
Leaders delegate most of the responsibility to the group. They monitor progress but are less involved in decision-making.	Leaders focus on relationships and less on providing direction. They work with the team and share decision-making responsibilities.	Leaders provide direction. But they attempt to sell their ideas to get people on board.	Leaders tell people what to do and how to do it.
Low task behavior. Low relationship behavior.	Low task behavior. High relationship behavior.	High task behavior. High relationship behavior.	High task behavior. Low relationship behavior.

Of these, no one style is considered optimal for all leaders to use all the time. Situational Leadership holds that effective leaders need to be flexible and must adapt themselves according to the situation.

== Performance Readiness levels ==
The right leadership style will depend on the person or group being led. The Situational Leadership Model identifies four levels of Performance Readiness R1-R4:

High	Medium		Low
R4	R3	R2	R1
Able and Confident and Willing	Able but Insecure or Unwilling	Unable but Confident or Willing	Unable and Insecure or Unwilling

Performance Readiness levels are also task-specific. A person might be generally skilled, confident, and motivated in their job, but would still have a Performance Readiness level R1 when asked to perform a task requiring skills they don't possess. Blanchard's SLII Model makes some changes to these, relabeling all as development levels rather than Performance Readiness.

In later editions of Management of Organizational Behavior, the follower's development continuum was changed from Maturity levels to Follower Readiness, indicative of how ready a person is to perform a specific task, not a personal characteristic. In the ninth edition, it was further refined and relabeled Performance Readiness. According to Hersey, Performance Readiness is dynamic and as it changes, depending on the task at hand, it also varies, depending on the individual and the specific situation.

== Developing people and self-motivation ==
Hersey maintains that development is not a linear function. When developing Performance Readiness, people are unique. Everyone does not start at R1, then progress to R2, R3 and then R4. "A good leader develops the competence and commitment of their people so they're self-motivated rather than dependent on others for direction and guidance." According to Hersey's book, a leader's high, realistic expectation causes high performance of followers; a leader's low expectations lead to low performance of followers.

== SLII ==
Hersey and Blanchard continued to iterate on the original theory until 1977, when they mutually agreed to run their respective companies. In the late 1970s, Hersey changed the name from "situational leadership theory" to "situational leadership".

In 1979, Ken Blanchard founded Blanchard Training & Development, Inc. (later The Ken Blanchard Companies, updated to Blanchard in 2023), together with his wife Margie Blanchard and a board of founding associates. Over time, this group made changes to the concepts of the original Situational Leadership Model in several key areas, which included the research base, the leadership style labels, and the individual's development level continuum.

In 1985 Blanchard introduced SLII in the book Leadership and the One Minute Manager: A Situational Approach to Managing People. Blanchard and his colleagues continued to iterate and revise the book.

=== Framework of reference ===
The SLII model acknowledged the existing research of the situational leadership theory and revised the concepts.

The primary sources included:

- Malcolm Knowles' research in the area of adult learning theory and individual development stages, where he asserted that learning and growth are based on changes in self-concept, experience, readiness to learn, and orientation to learning.
- Kanfer and Ackerman's study of motivation and cognitive abilities and the difference between commitment and confidence, task knowledge and transferable skills.
- Bruce Tuckman's research in the field of group development, which compiled the results of 50 studies on group development and identified four stages of development: forming, storming, norming, and performing. Tuckman's later work identified a fifth stage of development called "termination". Tuckman found that when individuals are new to the team or task they are motivated but are usually relatively uninformed of the issues and objectives of the team. Tuckman felt that in the initial stage (forming) supervisors of the team need to be directive. Stage two, Storming, is characterized by conflict and polarization around interpersonal issues and how best to approach the task. These behaviors serve as resistance to group influence and task requirements and can cause performance to drop. As the team moves through the stages of development, performance and productivity increase.
- Lacoursiere's research in the 1980s synthesized the findings from 238 groups. Until Lacoursiere's work in 1980, most research had studied non-work groups; Lacoursiere's work validated the findings produced by Tuckman in regard to the five stages of group development.
- Susan Wheelan's 10-year study, published in 1990 and titled Creating Effective Teams, which confirmed the five stages of group development in Tuckman's work.

=== Leadership styles ===
The SLII model uses the terms "supportive behavior" where the Situational Leadership Model uses "relationship behavior" and "directive behavior" where the Situational Leadership Model uses "task behavior".

=== Development levels ===
Blanchard's SLII model uses the terms "competence" (ability, knowledge, and skill) and "commitment" (confidence and motivation) to describe different levels of development.

According to Ken Blanchard, "Four combinations of competence and commitment make up what we call 'development level.'"

D4	D3	D2	D1
Self-reliant Achiever: High competence with high commitment	Capable but Cautious Performer: High competence with low/variable commitment	Disillusioned Learner: Low/middling competence with low commitment	Enthusiastic Beginner: Low competence with high commitment

In order to make an effective cycle, a leader needs to motivate followers properly by adjusting their leadership style to the development level of the person. Blanchard postulates that Enthusiastic Beginners (D1) need a directing leadership style while Disillusioned Learners (D2) require a coaching style. He suggests that Capable but Cautious Performers (D3) respond best to a Supporting leadership style and Self-reliant Achievers (D4) need leaders who offer a delegating style.

The SLII model tends to view development as an evolutionary progression meaning that when individuals approach a new task for the first time, they start out with little or no knowledge, ability or skills, but with high enthusiasm, motivation, and commitment. Blanchard views development as a process as the individual moves from developing to developed, in this viewpoint it is still incumbent upon the leader to diagnose development level and then use the appropriate leadership style which can vary based on each task, goal, or assignment.

In the Blanchard SLII model, the belief is that an individual comes to a new task or role with low competence (knowledge and transferable skills) but high commitment. As the individual gains experience and is appropriately supported and directed by their leader they reach development level 2 and gain some competence, but their commitment drops because the task may be more complex than the individual had originally perceived when they began the task. With the direction and support of their leader, the individual moves to development level 3 where competence can still be variable—fluctuating between moderate to high knowledge, ability and transferable skills and variable commitment as they continue to gain mastery of the task or role. Finally, the individual moves to development level 4 where competence and commitment are high.

== See also ==
- Two-factor theory
- Managerial grid model
- 3D Theory
- Contingency theory
- Three levels of leadership model
- Trait leadership

== Resources ==
- Hersey, P. and Blanchard, K. H. (1977). Management of Organizational Behavior: Utilizing Human Resources (3rd ed.) New Jersey/Prentice Hall, ISBN 978-0132617697
- Blanchard, K. H., & Johnson, S. (1982). The one minute manager. 1st Morrow ed. New York, Morrow. ISBN 978-0-688-01429-2
