= Fred Fiedler =

Austrian-American industrial and organizational psychiatrist

Fred Edward Fiedler (July 13, 1922 – June 8, 2017) was an Austrian-American industrial and organizational psychologist known for his work on leadership and contingency theory.

== Biography ==
He was born in Vienna, Austria, to Victor and Helga Schallinger Fiedler. His parents owned a textile and tailoring supply store prior to 1938. Fiedler immigrated to the United States shortly after the Anschluss in 1938 and became a US citizen in 1943. He served in the US Army from 1942 to 1945. He studied psychology at the University of Chicago where he obtained his undergraduate degree and later a Ph.D. in clinical psychology in 1949. In 1951, he joined the University of Illinois and became a member of the psychology faculty. He became the director of the Group Effectiveness Laboratory at the University of Illinois from 1959 to 1969.

He was a business and management psychologist at the University of Washington and held positions in the Department of Psychology and the School of Business. He directed organizational research at the university from 1969 until his retirement in 1992.

He helped this field move from the research on traits and personal characteristics of leaders to leadership styles and behaviours. In 1967 he introduced the contingency model of leadership, later known as the Fiedler contingency model.

Fiedler's work with the contingency model of leadership provided an answer to the failings of the trait and behavioral theories and added to the understanding of the dynamics of leadership.

He died in June 2017 in Washington state at the age of 94 and was survived by his wife, Judith (whom he met as a student in the 1940s), and three daughters (Decky Fiedler, Tory Fiedler and Carol Fiedler-Kawaguchi). A funeral was held for him at Mercer Island, Washington.

== Sources and bibliography ==
- Ashour, A.S. (1973) ‘The Contingency Model of Leadership Effectiveness: An Evaluation’, Organizational Behavior and Human Decision Processes, 9(3): 339–55.
- Bass, B.M. (1990) ‘Leader March’, a Handbook of Leadership, New York: The Free Press, 494–510, 651–2, 840–41.
- Fiedler, F.E. (1958) Leader Attitudes and Group Effectiveness, Urbana, IL: University of Illinois Press.
- Fiedler, F.E. (1967) A Theory of Leadership Effectiveness, New York: McGraw-Hill.
- Fiedler, F.E. (1971) Leadership, New York: General Learning Press.
- Fiedler, F.E. (1981) Leader Attitudes and Group Effectiveness, Westport, CT: Greenwood Publishing Group.
- Fiedler, F.E. (1992) ‘Life in a Pretzel-shaped Universe’, in A.G. Bedeian (ed.), Management Laureates: A Collection of Autobiographical Essays, Greenwich, CT: JAI Press, vol. 1, 301–34.
- Fiedler, F.E. (1994) Leadership Experience and Leadership Performance, Alexandria, VA: US Army Research Institute for the Behavioral and Social Sciences.
- Fiedler, F.E. (1997) Directory of the American Psychological Association, Chicago: St James Press, 419.
- Fiedler, F.E. and Chemers, M.M. (1974) Leadership and Effective Management, Glenview, IL: Scott, Foresman and Co.
- Fiedler, F.E. and Garcia, J.E. (1987) New Approaches to Leadership, Cognitive Resources and Organizational Performance, New York: John Wiley and Sons.
- Fiedler, F.E., Chemers, M.M. and Mahar, L. (1976) Improving Leadership Effectiveness: The Leader Match Concept, New York: John Wiley and Sons.
- Fiedler, F.E., Garcia, J.E. and Lewis, C.T. (1986) People Management, and Productivity, Boston: Allyn and Bacon.
- Fiedler, F.E., Gibson, F.W. and Barrett, K.M. (1993) ‘Stress, Babble, and the Utilization of the Leader’s Intellectual Abilities’, Leadership Quarterly 4(2): 189–208.
- Fiedler, F.E., Godfrey, E.P. and Hall, D.M. (1959) Boards, Management and Company Success, Danville, IL: Interstate Publishers.
- Hooijberg, R. and Choi, J. (1999) "From Austria to the United States and from Evaluating Therapists to Developing Cognitive Resources Theory: An Interview with Fred Fiedler", Leadership Quarterly 10(4): 653–66.
- King, B., Streufert, S. and Fiedler, F.E. (1978) Managerial Control and Organizational Democracy, Washington, DC: V.H. Winston and Sons.
- Schriesheim, C.A. and Kerr, S. (1977a) "Theories and Measures of Leadership", in J.G. Hunt, and L.L. Larson (eds), Leadership: The Cutting Edge, Carbondale, IL: Southern Illinois University Press, 9–45.
- Fiedler, F.E. 1977b) "R.I.P LPC: A Response to Fiedler", in J.G. Hunt, and L.L. Larson (eds), Leadership: The Cutting Edge, Carbondale, IL: Southern Illinois University Press, 51–6.
- Vecchio, R.P. (1977) "An Empirical Examination of the Validity of Fiedler’s Model of Leadership Effectiveness", Organizational Behavior and Human Performance 19: 180–206.
- Fiedler, F.E. (1983) ‘Assessing the Validity of Fiedler’s Contingency Model of Leadership Effectiveness: A Closer look at Strube and Garcia’, Psychological Bulletin 93: 404–8.
