= Trait leadership =

Patterns of personal characteristics that foster consistent leader effectiveness

Trait leadership is defined as integrated patterns of personal characteristics that reflect a range of individual differences and foster consistent leader effectiveness across a variety of group and organizational situations.

The theory is developed from early leadership research which focused primarily on finding a group of heritable attributes that differentiate leaders from nonleaders. Leader effectiveness refers to the amount of influence a leader has on individual or group performance, followers’ satisfaction, and overall effectiveness. Many scholars have argued that leadership is unique to only a select number of individuals, and that these individuals possess certain immutable traits that cannot be developed. Although this perspective has been criticized immensely over the past century, scholars still continue to study the effects of personality traits on leader effectiveness. Research has demonstrated that successful leaders differ from other people and possess certain core personality traits that significantly contribute to their success. Understanding the importance of these core personality traits that predict leader effectiveness can help organizations with their leader selection, training, and development practices.

== History of research ==
The emergence of the concept of trait leadership can be traced back to Thomas Carlyle's "great man" theory, which stated that "The History of the World [...] was the Biography of Great Men". Subsequent commentators interpreted this view to conclude that the forces of extraordinary leadership (Note: Carlyle in On Heroes did not use the word "leadership" in his discussion of the hero as divinity, as prophet, as poet, as priest, as man of letters, and as "king"; he mentions "leader" and "leaders" only 6 times (once quite disparagingly) in that work.) shape history. Influenced by Carlyle, Francis Galton in Hereditary Genius took this idea further. Galton found that leadership was a unique property of extraordinary individuals and suggested that the traits that leaders possessed were immutable and could not be developed. Throughout the early 1900s, the study of leadership focused on traits. Cowley commented that the approach to the research of leadership has usually been and should always be through the study of traits. Many theorists, influenced by Carlyle and Galton, believed that trait leadership depended on the personal qualities of the leader, however, they did not assume that leadership only resides within a select number of people. This trait perspective of leadership was widely accepted until the late 1940s and early 1950s, when researchers began to deem personality traits insufficient in predicting leader effectiveness.

In 1948, Stogdill stated that leadership exists between persons in a social situation, and that persons who are leaders in one situation may not necessarily be leaders in other situations. This statement has been cited ubiquitously as sounding the death knell for trait-leadership theory. Furthermore, scholars commented that any trait's effect on leadership behavior will always depend on the situation. Subsequently, leadership stopped being characterized by individual differences, and instead both behavioral and situational analyses of leadership took over. These analyses began to dominate the field of leadership research. During this period of widespread rejection, several dominant theories took the place of trait leadership theory, including Fiedler's contingency model, Blake and Mouton's managerial grid, Hersey and Blanchard's situational leadership model, and transformational and transactional leadership models.

Despite the growing criticisms of trait leadership, the purported basis for the rejection of trait-leadership models began to encounter strong challenges in the 1980s. Zaccaro pointed out that even Stogdill's 1948 review, although cited as evidence against leader traits, contained conclusions supporting that individual differences could still be predictors of leader effectiveness. With an increasing number of empirical studies directly supporting trait leadership, traits have reemerged in the lexicon of the scientific research into leadership. In recent years, the research about leader traits has made some progress in identifying a list of personality traits that are highly predictive of leader effectiveness. Additionally, to account for the arguments for situational leadership, researchers have used the round-robin design methodology to test whether certain individuals emerge as leaders across multiple situations. Scholars have also proposed new ways of studying the relationship of certain traits to leader effectiveness. For instance, many suggest the integration of trait and behavioral theories to understand how traits relate to leader effectiveness. Furthermore, scholars have expanded their focus and have proposed looking at more malleable traits (ones susceptible to development) in addition to the traditional dispositional traits as predictors of leader effectiveness. Context is only now beginning to be examined as a contributor to leaders' success and failure. Productive narcissistic CEOs like Steven Jobs of Apple and Jack Welch of GE have demonstrated a gift for creating innovation, whereas leaders with idealized traits prove more successful in more stable environments requiring less innovation and creativity.

Cultural fit and leadership value can be determined by evaluating an individual's own behavior, perceptions of their employees and peers, and the direct objective results of their organization, and then comparing these findings against the needs of the company.

== Leadership traits ==
The investigations of leader traits are always by no means exhaustive. In recent years, several studies have made comprehensive reviews about leader traits that have been historically studied. There are many ways that traits related to leadership can be categorized; however, the two most recent categorizations have organized traits into (1) demographic vs. task competence vs. interpersonal and (2) distal (trait-like) vs. proximal (state-like):

=== Demographic, task competence and interpersonal leadership ===
Based on a recent review of the trait leadership literature, Derue et al stated that most leader traits can be organized into three categories: demographic, task competence, and interpersonal attributes. For the demographics category, gender has by far received the most attention in terms of leadership; however, most scholars have found that male and female leaders are both equally effective. Task competence relates to how individuals approach the execution and performance of tasks. Hoffman et al grouped intelligence, conscientiousness, openness to experience, and emotional stability into this category. Lastly, interpersonal attributes are related to how a leader approaches social interactions. According to Hoffman et al, Extraversion and Agreeableness should be grouped into this category.

=== Distal (trait-like) vs. proximal (state-like) ===
Recent research has shifted from focusing solely on distal (dispositional/trait-like) characteristics of leaders to more proximal (malleable/state-like) individual differences often in the form of knowledge and skills. The hope is that emergence of proximal traits in trait leadership theory will help researchers elucidate the old question whether leaders are born or made. Proximal individual differences suggest that the characteristics that distinguish effective leaders from non-effective leaders are not necessarily stable through the life-span, implying that these traits may be able to be developed. Hoffman et al examined the effects of distal vs. proximal traits on leader effectiveness. They found that distal individual differences of achievement motivation, energy, flexibility, dominance, honesty/integrity, self-confidence, creativity, and charisma were strongly correlated with leader effectiveness. Additionally, they found that the proximal individual differences of interpersonal skills, oral communication, written communication, management skills, problem solving skills, and decision making were also strongly correlated with leader effectiveness. Their results suggested that on average, distal and proximal individual differences have a similar relationship with effective leadership.

== Trait-leadership model ==
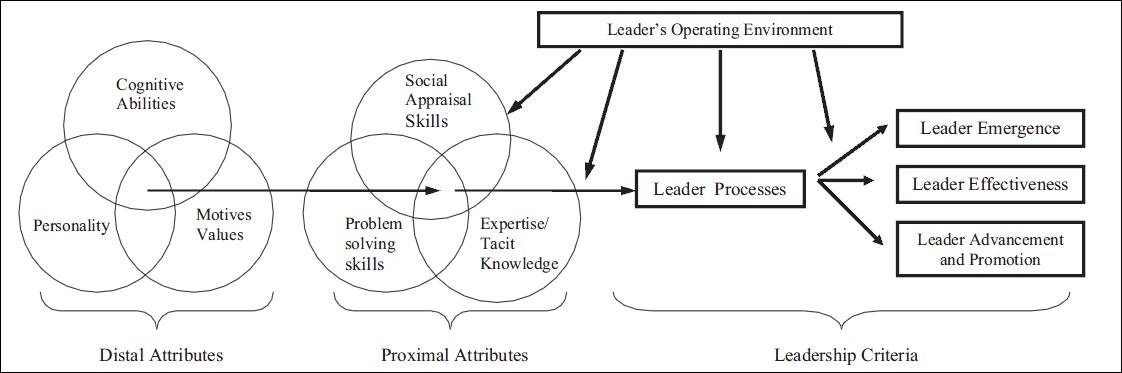
Figure 1: Model of Trait Leadership.

Zaccaro et al created a model to understand leader traits and their influence on leader effectiveness/performance. This model, shown in figure 1, is based on other models of leader traits and leader effectiveness/performance. and rests on two basic premises about leader traits. The first premise is that leadership emerges from the combined influence of multiple traits as opposed to emerging from the independent assessment of traits. Zaccaro argued that effective leadership is derived from an integrated set of cognitive abilities, social capabilities, and dispositional tendencies, with each set of traits adding to the influence of the other. The second premise is that leader traits differ in their proximal influence on leadership. This model is a multistage one in which certain distal attributes (i.e. dispositional attributes, cognitive abilities, and motives/values) serve as precursors for the development of proximal personal characteristics (i.e. social skills, problem solving skills and expertise knowledge). Adopting this categorization approach and based on several comprehensive reviews/meta-analysis of trait leadership in recent years, we tried to make an inclusive list of leader traits (Table 1). However, the investigations of leader traits are always by no means exhaustive.

Table 1. Leader Traits based on Zaccaro's (2004) model
Extraversion (Distal - Dispositional)	One dimension of Big-Five Personality Model; represents the tendency to be sociable, assertive, active, and to experience positive affects, such as energy and zeal. In Judge et al meta-analysis, Extraversion was significantly positive related to leadership (r = .31).
Agreeableness (Distal - Dispositional)	One dimension of Big-Five Personality Model; refers to the tendency to be trusting, compliant, caring, and gentle. The relationship between Agreeableness and leadership is still ambiguous. In Judge et al meta-analysis, Agreeableness was not significantly related to leadership (r = .08).
Conscientiousness (Distal - Dispositional)	One dimension of Big-Five Personality Model; it comprises two related facets, namely achievement and dependability. In Judge et al meta-analysis, Conscientiousness was significantly positively related to leadership (r = .28).
Openness (Distal - Dispositional)	One dimension of Big-Five Personality Model; the disposition to be imaginative, nonconforming, unconventional, and autonomous. In Judge et al meta-analysis, Openness was found to be significantly positively related with leadership (r = .24).
Neuroticism (Distal - Dispositional)	One dimension of Big-Five Personality Model; represents the tendency to exhibit poor emotional adjustment and experience negative affects, such as anxiety, insecurity, and hostility. In Judge et al meta-analysis, Neuroticism was significantly negatively correlated with leadership (r = -.24).
Honesty/integrity (Distal - Dispositional)	Defined as the correspondence between work and deed, and as being truthful and non deceitful. Honesty/integrity was found to be positively related to leadership effectiveness of others and surrounding factors (r = .29).
Charisma (Distal - Dispositional)	Charismatic leaders are able to influence followers by articulating a compelling vision for the future, arousing commitment to organizational objectives and inspiring commitment and a sense of self-efficacy among followers. It has a significant influence on leadership (r = .57).
Intelligence (Distal - Cognitive Abilities)	Intelligence is regarded as the most important trait in psychology. It has been identified as one of the most critical traits that must be possessed by all leaders.
Creativity (Distal - Cognitive Abilities)	Creativity has been proposed as an important component of effective leadership. A significant relationship was found between creativity and leader effectiveness (r = .31).
Achievement motivation (Distal - Motive/Value)	The motivation to achieve has been proved to have significant relationship with leader effectiveness (r = .23).
Need for power (Distal - Motive/Value)	Characterized by the satisfaction leaders derive from exerting influence over the attitudes and behaviors of others. Need for power has a positive relationship with leader effectiveness.
Oral/written communication (Proximal - Social Skills)	Oral and written communication skills are found to be significantly correlated with leader effectiveness.
Interpersonal skills (Proximal - Social Skills)	Including a broad range of skills associated with un understanding of human behavior and the dynamics of groups, interpersonal skills were found to be significantly correlated with leader effectiveness.
General problem solving (Proximal - Problem Solving)	General problem solving skills were found to be one of the factors most strongly correlated with leader effectiveness.
Decision making (Proximal - Problem Solving)	Decision skills were also found to be one of the factors most strongly correlated with leader effectiveness.
Technical knowledge (Proximal - Expertise Knowledge)	Technical knowledge includes methods, processes, and equipment for conducting the specialized activities of the managers’ organizational unit. It has been proved to be positively correlated with leader effectiveness.
Management skills (Proximal - Expertise Knowledge)	Given that leaders’ key responsibilities involve coordinating the work of multiple constituents, the ability to manage is likely crucial to leader effectiveness. This relationship has also been proved significant.

== Other models of trait leadership ==
Multiple models have been proposed to explain the relationship of traits to leader effectiveness. Recently, integrated trait leadership models were put forward by summarizing the historical findings and reconciling the conflict between traits and other factors such as situations in determining effective leadership. In addition to Zaccaro's Model of Leader Attributes and Leader Performance described in the previous section, two other models have emerged in recent trait leadership literature. The Leader Trait Emergence Effectiveness (LTEE) Model, created by Judge, Piccolo, & Kosalka in 2009, combines the behavioral genetics and evolutionary psychology theories of how personality traits are developed into a model that explains leader emergence and effectiveness. Additionally, this model separates objective and subjective leader effectiveness into different criterion. The authors created this model to be broad and flexible as to diverge from how the relationship between traits and leadership had been studied in past research. Another model that has emerged in the trait leadership literature is the Integrated Model of Leader Traits, Behaviors, and Effectiveness. This model combines traits and behaviors in predicting leader effectiveness and tested the mediation effect of leader behaviors on the relationship between leader traits and effectiveness. The authors found that some types of leader behaviors mediated the effect between traits and leader effectiveness. The results of a Derue et al study supported an integrated trait-behavioral model that can be used in future research.

== Criticisms of trait leadership ==
Although there has been an increased focus by researchers on trait leadership, this theory remains one of the most criticized theories of leadership. Over the years, many reviewers of trait leadership theory have commented that this approach to leadership is "too simplistic", and "futile". Additionally, scholars have noted that trait leadership theory usually only focuses on how leader effectiveness is perceived by followers rather than a leader's actual effectiveness. Because the process through which personality predicts the actual effectiveness of leaders has been relatively unexplored. these scholars have concluded that personality currently has low explanatory and predictive power over job performance and cannot help organizations select leaders who will be effective. Furthermore, Derue et al found that leader behaviors are more predictive of leader effectiveness than are traits.

Another criticism of trait leadership is its silence on the influence of the situational context surrounding leaders. Stogdill found that persons who are leaders in one situation may not be leaders in another situation. Complementing this situational theory of leadership, Murphy wrote that leadership does not reside in the person, and it usually requires examining the whole situation. In addition to situational leadership theory, there has been growing support for other leadership theories such as transformational, transactional, charismatic, and authentic leadership theories. These theories have gained popularity because they are more normative than the trait and behavioral leadership theories.

Previously, studies failed to uncover a trait or group of traits that are consistently associated with leadership emergence or help differentiate leaders from followers, but more recent research supports a link between narcissism and the emergence of leadership. Additionally, trait leadership's focus on a small set of personality traits and neglect of more malleable traits such as social skills and problem solving skills has received considerable criticism. Lastly, trait leadership often fails to consider the integration of multiple traits when studying the effects of traits on leader effectiveness.

== Implications for practice ==
Given the recent increase in evidence and support of trait leadership theory, scholars have suggested a variety of strategies for human resource departments within organizations. Companies should use personality traits as selection tools for identifying emerging leaders. These companies, however, should be aware of the individual traits that predict success in leader effectiveness as well as the traits that could be detrimental to leader effectiveness. For example, while Derue et al found that individuals who are high in Conscientiousness, Extraversion, and Agreeableness are predicted to be more likely to be perceived as successful in leadership positions, Judge et al wrote that individuals who are high in narcissism are more likely to be a liability in certain jobs. Narcissism is just one example of a personality trait that should be explored further by HR practitioners to ensure they are not placing individuals with certain traits in the wrong positions.

Complementing the suggestion that personality traits should be used as selection tools, it was found that the Big Five Personality traits were more strongly related to leadership than intelligence. This finding suggests that selecting leaders based on their personality is more important than selecting them based on intelligence. If organizations select leaders based on intelligence, it is recommended that these individuals be placed in leadership positions when the stress level is low and the individual has the ability to be directive.

Another way in which HR practitioners can use the research on trait leadership is for leadership development programs. Although inherent personality traits (distal/trait-like) are relatively immune to leadership development, Zaccaro suggested that proximal traits (state-like) will be more malleable and susceptible to leadership development programs. Companies should use different types of development interventions to stretch the existing capabilities of their leaders.

There is also evidence to suggest that Americans have an Extrovert Ideal, which dictates that people, most times unconsciously, favor the traits of extroverted individuals and suppress the qualities unique to introverts. Susan Cain's research points to a transition sometime around the turn of the century during which we stopped evaluating our leaders based on character and began judging them instead based on personality. While both extroverted and introverted leaders have been shown to be effective, we have a general proclivity towards extroverted traits, which when evaluating trait leadership, could skew our perception of what's that important.

== See also ==
- Leadership – Quality of an individual or group influencing or guiding others
- Charisma – Charm that can inspire devotion in others
- Trait theory – Approach to the study of human personality
- Big Five personality traits – Personality model consisting of five broad dimensions
- Personality psychology – Branch of psychology focused on personality
- Individual differences psychology – Branch of psychology
- Leadership development – Training process to develop leading abilities
- Situational leadership theory – Business model
- Three Levels of Leadership model – Leadership model formulated by James Scouller
- Transformational leadership – Strategic leadership style
- Transactional leadership – Style of strategic leadership
- Human resources – Organization's workforce
- Fiedler contingency model – Business and management theory
