= Leadership style =

Methods of managing people

A leadership style is a leader's method of providing direction, implementing plans, and motivating people. Various authors have proposed identifying many different leadership styles as exhibited by leaders in the political, business or other fields. Studies on leadership style are conducted in the military field, expressing an approach that stresses a holistic view of leadership, including how a leader's physical presence determines how others perceive that leader. The factors of physical presence in this context include military bearing, physical fitness, confidence, and resilience. A leader's conceptual abilities include agility, judgment, innovation, interpersonal tact, and domain knowledge. Leaders are characterized as individuals who have differential influence over the setting of goals, logistics for coordination, monitoring of effort, and rewards and punishment of group members. Domain knowledge encompasses tactical and technical knowledge as well as cultural and geopolitical awareness.

One of the key reasons why certain leadership styles are blocked with positive outcomes for employees and organizations is the extent to which they build follower trust in leaders. Trust in the leader has been linked to a range of leadership styles and evidence suggests that when followers trust their leaders they are more willing and able to go the extra mile to help their colleagues and organization. Trust also enables them to feel safe to speak up and share their ideas. In contrast, when a leader does not inspire trust, a follower’s performance may suffer as they must spend time and energy watching their backs.

Daniel Goleman, in his 2000 article "Leadership that Gets Results", talks about six styles of leadership.

== Autocratic ==
The autocratic leadership style particularly emphasises the distinction between authoritarian leaders and their followers. These types of leaders make sure to create only a distinct professional relationship. They regard direct supervision as fundamental in maintaining a successful environment and followership. Authoritarian leadership styles often follow the vision of those that are in control, and may not necessarily be compatible with those that are being led. Authoritarian leaders focus on efficiency, potentially seeing other styles, such as a democratic style, as a hindrance to progress. Examples of authoritarian leadership include a police officer directing traffic, a teacher ordering a student to do their assignment, and a supervisor instructing a subordinate to clean a workstation. All of these positions require a distinct set of characteristics that give the leader the position to get things in order or to get a point across. Authoritarian traits include: setting goals individually, engaging primarily in one-way and downward communication, controlling discussion with followers, dominating interactions, and keeping a strong main form of leadership.

Several studies have confirmed a relationship between bullying, on the one hand, and an autocratic leadership and an authoritarian way of settling conflicts or dealing with disagreements, on the other. An authoritarian style of leadership may create a climate of fear, leaving little or no room for dialogue, and where subordinates may regard complaining as futile. As such, authoritarian styles have sometimes been associated with reduced group-member satisfaction as compared to that in more democratic leadership styles.

Authoritarian leadership became popular for a period in the inter-war years – witness for example Stalin, Mussolini and Piłsudski.

== Paternalistic ==
Paternalistic leadership is useful in advocacy and advocating on behalf of another. A paternalistic leader acts as a parental figure by taking care of their subordinates as a parent would. In this style of leadership, the leader supplies complete concern for their followers or workers. In return, they receive the trust and loyalty of their people. Workers under this style of leadership are expected to become totally committed to what the leader believes and will forego opportunities to work independently. The relationship between these co-workers and the leader is extremely solid. The workers are expected to stay with a company for a longer period of time because of the loyalty and trust. Not only do they treat each other like family inside the workforce, but outside too. These workers can go to each other with any problems they have because they believe it will truly help them.

One of the downsides to a paternalistic leader is that the leader could start to play favorites in decisions. This leader would include the workers more apt to follow and start to exclude the ones who were less loyal. According to Padavic and Earnest, authors of "Business Dimensional and Organizational Counseling", paternalism is more difficult to come by in today's market. They believe this because there is a rise in lay-offs and stronger unionization. This affects paternalistic leaders because the co-workers may not believe that their jobs are 100% ensured. When this happens, workers begin to look for bigger and better job opportunities instead of staying at one company for a longer period of time. Because of this, the leader may not fully believe an employee staying with their organization when another job opportunity is discussed. This could put the workers and leader at risk for a bad situation.

According to B. M. Bass, who wrote Leadership and Performance Beyond Expectations, workers who follow paternalistic leadership also have better organization skills. The leader encourages organization because they allow the workers to complete tasks so that they can stay on top of their work. The workers complete tasks, which boosts self-confidence and it makes them work harder to reach and exceed their goal to prove to their boss they are working hard. Having this style of leadership can also help implement a reward system. This system will allow workers to work even better because there is something for them at the end of the tunnel. While doing this they will also be able to accomplish more work in a set time frame.

Even though paternalistic leadership style is practiced in majority of places such as India, South East Asia, Middle East and Africa, there has not been concrete empirical research on the implications of this leadership style due to the preconceived negative notions in the Western literature. These negative notions arise due to differences in the intrinsic cultural aspects defined by Geert Hofstede's study (1980). He stated that North American and Western European countries classify themselves as individualistic cultures centred around the principles of egalitarianism, lack of in-group interdependence, direct communication and low power distance. Therefore, from a western perspective, the authoritative aspects of paternalism are not accepted innately, whereas the parental aspect of this leadership style is looked upon as an invasion of privacy as personal and professional lives are two separate facets of life. On the other hand, the paternalistic leadership style is quite effective and successful in non-western cultures which are collectivistic in nature as these societies look up to their leaders as a fatherly figure and rely upon them for guidance and protection in return of deference and loyalty, thereby aligning with the principles of paternalistic style.

It is essential that extensive research be initiated from a non-Western point of view to understand the implications of this leadership style on social, cultural and organisational metrics without any negative bias.

== Democratic ==
The democratic leadership style consists of the leader sharing the decision-making abilities with group members by promoting the interests of the group members and by practicing social equality.

The boundaries of democratic participation tend to be circumscribed by the organization or the group needs and the instrumental value of people's attributes (skills, attitudes, etc.). The democratic style encompasses the notion that everyone, by virtue of their human status, should play a part in the group's decisions. However, the democratic style of leadership still requires guidance and control by a specific leader. The democratic style demands the leader to make decisions on who should be called upon within the group and who is given the right to participate in, make, and vote on decisions.

Research has found that this leadership style is one of the most effective and creates higher productivity, better contributions from group members, and increased group morale. Democratic leadership can lead to better ideas and more creative solutions to problems because group members are encouraged to share their thoughts and ideas. While democratic leadership is one of the most effective leadership styles, it does have some potential downsides. In situations where roles are unclear or time is of the essence, democratic leadership can lead to communication failures and uncompleted projects. Democratic leadership works best in situations where group members are skilled and eager to share their knowledge. It is also important to have plenty of time to allow people to contribute, develop a plan, and then vote on the best course of action.

== Laissez-faire ==
The laissez-faire leadership style is where all the rights and power to make decisions is fully given to the followers. This was first described by Lewin, Lippitt, and White in 1939, along with the autocratic leadership and the democratic leadership styles.

Laissez-faire leaders allow followers to have complete freedom to make decisions concerning the completion of their work. It allows followers a self-rule, while at the same time offering guidance and support when requested. The laissez-faire leader using guided freedom provides the followers with all materials necessary to accomplish their goals, but does not directly participate in decision-making unless the followers request their assistance.

This is an effective style to use when:

- Followers are highly skilled, experienced, and educated.
- Followers have pride in their work and the drive to do it successfully on their own.
- Followers are experts, in situations where followers have more knowledge than the group leader.
- Followers are trustworthy and experienced.

Note that these conditions would intuitively mean that the group is already likely to be effective.

This style should not be used when:

- The leader cannot or will not provide regular feedback to their followers.

This leadership style has been associated with lower productivity than both autocratic and democratic styles of leadership and with lower group member satisfaction than democratic leadership. Some researchers have suggested that laissez-faire leadership can actually be considered non-leadership or leadership avoidance.

== Transactional ==
Transactional leaders focus their leadership on motivating followers through a system of rewards and punishments. There are two factors which form the basis for this system: contingent reward; and management-by-exception.

- Contingent reward provides rewards, materialistic or psychological, for effort and recognizes good performance.
- Management-by-exception allows the leader to maintain the status quo. The leader intervenes when subordinates do not meet acceptable performance levels and initiates corrective action to improve performance. Management by exception helps reduce the workload of managers being that they are only called-in when workers deviate from course.

This type of leader identifies the needs of their followers and gives rewards to satisfy those needs in exchange for a certain level of performance. Transactional leaders focus on increasing the efficiency of established routines and procedures. They are more concerned with following existing rules than with making changes to the organization. A transactional leader establishes and standardizes practices that will help the organization reach:

- Maturity
- Goal-setting
- Efficiency of operation
- Increasing productivity.

=== Effect on work teams ===
A survey was conducted by Jun Liu, Xiaoyu Liu and Xianju Zeng on the correlation between transactional leadership and how innovations can be affected by team emotions. The research was composed of 90 work teams, with a total of 460 members and 90 team leaders. The study found that there is a relationship between emotions, labor behavior and transactional leadership that affects the team. Depending on the level of emotions of the team; this can affect the transactional leader in a positive or negative way. Transactional leaders work better in teams where there is a lower level of emotions towards a project. This is because individuals are able to think freely when setting their emotions aside from their work and place all of their focus on a given task. From this, it can be seen that a transactional leader is negatively affected when the emotional level is high and positively affected when the emotional level is low.

Transactional leadership presents a form of strategic leadership that is important for the organization's development. Transactional leadership is essential for team innovation. A strategic orientation encompasses the ability to link long-term ambitions with daily tasks.

== Transformational ==
Advocates of transformational leadership portray the transformational leader as a type of person not limited by followers' perception. Advocates should strive to assist individuals in regaining and enhancing their ideas in an efficient and timely manner which requires leadership. The main objective is to work to change or transform followers' needs and redirect their thinking. Leaders who follow the transformational style challenge and inspire their followers ideas with a sense of purpose and excitement.

Transformational leaders also create a vision of what they aspire to be, and communicate this idea to others (their followers). Schultz and Schultz identify three characteristics of a transformational leader:

- Charismatic leadership has a broad field of knowledge, has a self-promoting personality, high/great energy level, and willing to take risk and use irregular strategies in order to stimulate their followers to think independently
- Individualized consideration
- Intellectual stimulation

== See also ==
- Charismatic leadership
- Narcissistic leadership
- Servant leadership
- Management
  - Management style
- High-performance teams
