= Authentic leadership =

Leadership theory and research construct

Authentic leadership is most recently defined as "concordant, values-based leader signalling of self-awareness, internalised moral perspective, balanced processing, and relational transparency". In this formulation, authentic leadership is a subtype of leadership expressed through signals that followers can observe and interpret in interaction. The literature broadly organises the construct around the same four dimensions established in earlier models. Meta-analytic reviews link authentic leadership ratings with follower trust, work engagement, citizenship behaviour, and performance indicators across cultures and settings. This framing connects leader conduct with follower perceptions and workplace outcomes.

Scholars debate definition, measurement, and inference in authentic leadership research. Critics argue that some scales mix behaviour descriptions with motives or outcomes, which complicates construct tests and causal claims. A series of experiments on positive leadership styles, including authentic leadership, suggests that some observed associations between leadership ratings and outcomes may, in part, reflect a "causal illusion" arising from evaluative features of leadership measures. Conceptual critiques question assumptions about an essential self and examine tensions between personal convictions and leadership roles in organisations. A 20-year review editorial redefines authentic leadership through signalling theory and calls for models that specify discrete behaviours aligned with the four dimensions. More broadly, a review of leadership signalling research identifies opportunities for greater theoretical precision, proposing three conditions for credible leadership signals: an unobservable leadership quality, an observable signal, and signal costs that vary with that quality in ways capable of producing a separating equilibrium. Method reviews note that much observational research cannot by itself establish causality, while experimental studies may involve trade-offs between causal identification, realism, and consequential outcomes for participants; they therefore encourage experiments and multi-method designs that address these limitations across contexts.

== Historical background ==
The intellectual history of authenticity predates leadership scholarship by more than two millennia. Harter traces personal authenticity to ancient Greek injunctions such as “know thyself”, while Shakespeare gave the related idea one of its best-known English expressions in Hamlet through Polonius’s counsel, “to thine own self be true”. Across these traditions, authenticity concerned the relationship between understanding oneself and living in accordance with that understanding. The same concern later entered scholarship on the self, where researchers examined how identity develops through reflection and experience. By the twentieth century, authenticity had become a subject of philosophical and psychological inquiry, providing much of the conceptual vocabulary that leadership scholars would later draw upon.

Twentieth-century accounts moved authenticity away from a simple conception of a fixed personal essence and towards questions of choice, self-formation, and congruence. Heidegger treated authenticity within an existential account of how people confront the possibilities of their own existence, while Sartre emphasised freedom and the continuing construction of the self. Humanistic psychology developed related ideas through accounts of self-congruence and actualisation, particularly in the work of Rogers and Maslow. Across these traditions, authenticity came to describe processes through which people develop knowledge of themselves and seek coherence between that understanding and their conduct. Later organisational reviews similarly distinguish philosophical, psychological, and work-related conceptions of authenticity rather than treating them as a single settled construct.

== Modern academic development ==
Sustained development of the contemporary authentic leadership construct began in the early 2000s. Kernis conceptualised authenticity through four components: awareness, unbiased processing, action, and a relational component. His framework provided a structure that leadership scholars could adapt to questions about how leaders understand themselves and express that understanding in relationships. In the same year, former Medtronic chief executive Bill George brought authentic leadership to a practitioner audience, while Luthans and Avolio introduced a positive developmental account within organisational scholarship. Interest also grew amid concern about corporate leadership following failures such as Enron and WorldCom, which focused public attention on integrity and trust in leaders.

Avolio and Gardner consolidated this emerging research programme through a special issue of The Leadership Quarterly that followed the 2004 Gallup Leadership Institute summit. Contributions developed self-based models of authentic leader and follower development and extended the construct through work on well-being and leader life stories. Walumbwa et al. then formalised a four-dimensional model comprising self-awareness, relational transparency, an internalised moral perspective, and balanced processing, which became the dominant operationalisation of the construct. Gardner et al.’s review documented 91 publications and described a field moving from conceptual development towards an expanding empirical literature.

As the literature expanded, scholars subjected authentic leadership to greater conceptual and methodological scrutiny. Alvesson and Einola challenged its philosophical foundations and positive moral framing, followed by an exchange that set out the case for and against the theory. A 2024 special issue of the Journal of Management & Organization marked twenty years since The Leadership Quarterly initiative and included a systematic review of 303 articles published from 2010 to 2023. The issue opened by redefining authentic leadership through signalling theory while retaining the four dimensions that organise much of the literature, with subsequent contributions adopting or extending the signalling formulation. Other contributions conceptualised leader authenticity as a dynamic process shaped by shifting identities and introduced “bounded authenticity” to account for constraints imposed by leadership roles. These developments place context and enacted behaviour closer to the centre of contemporary authentic leadership theory.

== Authenticity and authentic leadership ==
Authenticity and authentic leadership are related but distinct constructs. Authenticity has a much older intellectual history and addresses the broader question of what it means for a person to know and act in accordance with the self. Psychological accounts commonly emphasise self-knowledge and congruence between internal values and outward conduct, while philosophical traditions have treated the self as developmental, contingent, and continually shaped through experience and choice. These traditions make authenticity conceptually difficult because they raise questions about whether a stable “true self” exists, how that self can be known, and whether consistency with one’s existing identity is necessarily desirable. Organisational scholarship increasingly treats authenticity as multifaceted and context-sensitive rather than as correspondence with a fixed inner essence.

Authentic leadership, in contrast, is an organisational leadership construct developed primarily since the early 2000s. It does not simply describe a leader who appears genuine or behaves in accordance with any personal characteristic. The construct is organised around four specified dimensions: self-awareness, an internalised moral perspective, balanced processing, and relational transparency. More recent theory defines authentic leadership as “concordant, values-based leader signalling” of these dimensions, locating the construct in the leadership behaviours and communications through which followers infer qualities about the leader. Authentic leadership is therefore treated as a subtype of the leadership process rather than a general theory of personal authenticity, and it has been operationalised through established instruments such as the ALQ and ALI.

The distinction is especially important when considering morality. A person can be authentic in the ordinary or philosophical sense while holding values or expressing characteristics that others regard as objectionable. Acting consistently with prejudice, hostility, or extremist beliefs may display self-congruence without satisfying the academic construct of authentic leadership. Critics have questioned the assumption that acting consistently with a “true self” is inherently moral, while Lemoine et al. locate the moral content of authentic leadership in a virtue-ethics tradition rather than in authenticity alone. Authentic leadership historically incorporated an internalised moral perspective and, in its signalling formulation, explicitly requires signals to be values-based as well as concordant. Lux and Lowe retain this qualification to distinguish authentic leadership from strategic impression management and from a morally neutral conception of consistency with the self. The construct specifies a particular form of values-grounded leadership behaviour rather than treating authenticity alone as sufficient for effective or ethical leadership.

The distinction also clarifies the scope of longstanding criticism. Philosophical objections to a singular “true self” have prompted recent formulations to avoid defining authentic leadership through a fixed inner essence. Lux and Lowe use concordance to describe alignment between leaders’ values and the signals they express across changing identities and contexts, while Bunjak et al. and Kark and Cohen develop dynamic and bounded accounts of authentic leadership. Authentic leadership retains conceptual and measurement debates of its own, including questions about moral framing, behavioural specification, follower perceptions, and causal inference. Separating these constructs allows philosophical debates about authenticity and empirical debates about authentic leadership to be evaluated on their respective terms rather than treating them as the same problem.

== Definitions ==
Definitions of authentic leadership developed from earlier work on personal authenticity, which centred on self-knowledge and congruence between a person’s internal values and outward conduct. Harter described authenticity in terms of owning one’s experiences, while Kernis associated it with awareness of the self and behaviour consistent with that awareness. Leadership scholars carried these ideas into organisational research by treating authenticity as a developmental process rather than a fixed personal state. Luthans and Avolio described authentic leadership as a process grounded in self-awareness and self-regulated behaviour, while Avolio et al. incorporated moral perspective, contextual awareness, and psychological capacities into their account. These early definitions established self-knowledge and behavioural congruence as recurring features of the construct, while leaving its conceptual boundaries open to further refinement.

Walumbwa et al. provided the definition that shaped much of the subsequent empirical literature. They conceptualised authentic leadership as a pattern of leader behaviour that draws upon positive psychological capacities and an ethical climate to foster self-awareness, an internalised moral perspective, balanced processing, and relational transparency. Their model gave researchers a four-dimensional structure that could be operationalised through the Authentic Leadership Questionnaire. Peus et al. offered a related account in which authentic leaders understand their strengths and weaknesses, remain guided by moral convictions, and consider how their leadership affects others. Across these formulations, the literature converged around four dimensions while retaining assumptions that authentic leadership involved moral conduct and positive development.

Later scholarship questioned whether these definitions distinguished leader behaviour from its antecedents, evaluations, and effects. Fischer and Sitkin argued that positive leadership style research often embeds presumed intentions or outcomes within the construct itself, making it difficult to isolate what leaders actually do. Lux and Lowe addressed this problem by redefining authentic leadership as “concordant, values-based leader signalling of self-awareness, internalised moral perspective, balanced processing, and relational transparency”. The definition retains the four dimensions while locating authentic leadership in signals that leaders send or emanate through observable conduct. It also replaces the idea of a fixed “true self” with concordance between leaders’ values and expressed behaviour. Gardner, Karam, et al. subsequently adopted this refined definition in their systematic review. Other contributions to the 20-year special issue explicitly drew on the signalling formulation in developing a dynamic identity model and experimentally examining leader exemplification and ethical conduct as signals of authenticity; Kark and Cohen also discussed the signalling definition alongside their bounded-authenticity account. Subsequent empirical studies have likewise used the signalling perspective to frame authentic leadership behaviour and processes in workplace intervention and leader life-story research.

=== Dimensions ===
Authentic leadership is organised around four dimensions: self-awareness, an internalised moral perspective, balanced processing, and relational transparency. Self-awareness involves developing an understanding of one’s strengths, weaknesses, and values, then behaving in ways that accord with that knowledge. It also includes recognising how one’s behaviour affects others and using their experiences to refine one’s understanding of oneself. Feedback can contribute to self-awareness by revealing talents and limitations that leaders may struggle to see from their own perspective. Authentic leadership treats this process as developmental rather than fixed. Leaders build self-awareness through reflection on their experiences, including events that have shaped their identity and values, and continue revising that understanding over time.

An internalised moral perspective involves deciding what one believes to be right and acting in accordance with those principles. Leaders draw on their own values when evaluating what is fair in a given situation instead of allowing social norms, organisational expectations, or anticipated outcomes to determine their conduct. The dimension places moral self-regulation at the centre of authentic leadership. Leaders may face pressure to follow established practice, accommodate powerful interests, or pursue actions that benefit particular stakeholders. An internalised moral perspective requires them to examine those pressures against their convictions and retain the courage to act consistently with their principles. Such decisions can impose personal or professional costs, particularly when leaders challenge entrenched expectations or the interests of those with greater authority.

Balanced processing involves recognising one’s own biases and attempting to evaluate relevant information with greater objectivity. Leaders acknowledge the limits of their judgement, including heuristics and assumptions that can shape decision-making, and seek information that can test their existing beliefs. This includes asking others for input, encouraging perspectives that differ from their own, and listening before reaching a decision. Balanced processing also requires a willingness to acknowledge mistakes, uncertainty, or gaps in knowledge and to revise a judgement when the evidence supports another conclusion. The dimension extends beyond gathering information. It describes an approach to decision-making in which leaders expose their own reasoning to challenge instead of protecting established views from scrutiny.

Relational transparency involves openness and honesty in interactions with others, including expressing ideas clearly and communicating what one genuinely thinks or feels. Leaders may reveal aspects of their personal experiences, acknowledge mistakes, express uncertainty, and share perspectives in ways that allow others to understand the person behind the leadership role. Such disclosure involves vulnerability because it exposes leaders to judgement from followers and other stakeholders. Relational transparency still has boundaries. Leaders may hold information in confidence or limit disclosure where openness would compromise their responsibilities or the welfare of others. The dimension therefore calls for genuine rather than unrestricted self-expression, an interpretation consistent with later work on the constraints imposed by relationships and leadership roles.

== Signalling theory ==
Signalling theory explains how people convey information about qualities that others cannot observe directly through phenomena that they can perceive. Applied to leadership, followers form impressions of leaders from what leaders say, do, display, and communicate across interactions. These observable cues provide information from which followers infer underlying attributes, intentions, and values. Leader signals can take many forms, including spoken communication, written messages, and non-verbal behaviour, while their meaning depends on the context in which followers receive them. Signalling therefore offers a behavioural account of leadership influence because it directs attention towards what leaders make perceptible to others rather than treating leadership as an internal state that exists independently of interaction.

Lux and Lowe applied signalling theory to authentic leadership to address ambiguity about what authentic leaders actually do. Their formulation treats self-awareness, internalised moral perspective, balanced processing, and relational transparency as categories of information that leaders communicate through their behaviour. A leader might signal self-awareness by acknowledging a limitation, balanced processing by inviting a dissenting view, or relational transparency by explaining the reasoning behind a decision. This approach shifts the construct towards discrete leader behaviour while preserving the four dimensions established in earlier authentic leadership research. It also separates authentic leadership from its antecedents and effects. Psychological capacities may enable particular signals, while follower trust or performance may follow from them, but neither becomes part of the leadership behaviour itself.

The revised definition qualifies authentic leadership signals as both concordant and values-based. Concordance refers to alignment between what leaders believe and what they communicate through their conduct, while values-based signalling anchors that alignment in the principles and ethical convictions that guide the leader. These qualifiers distinguish authentic leadership from impression management because signals can otherwise be constructed to create impressions that diverge from the sender’s underlying qualities. The concept also avoids relying on a singular “true self.” Leaders may draw on different identities across situations while retaining coherence between their values and the signals they send. Contemporary authentic leadership can therefore accommodate changes in identity and role expression while retaining behavioural congruence as a defining feature.

== Measures ==
Researchers have developed several instruments to assess authentic leadership and related forms of leader authenticity. Contemporary empirical research has relied most heavily on the Authentic Leadership Questionnaire (ALQ) and the Authentic Leadership Inventory (ALI), both of which operationalise authentic leadership through self-awareness, an internalised moral perspective, balanced processing, and relational transparency. The ALQ was developed first and became the dominant measure during the early expansion of the literature, while the ALI followed as an alternative instrument with publicly available items and its own validation evidence. Lux et al. found that measure choice moderated only a small subset of the 35 relationships examined in their meta-analysis, although differences emerged for several specific correlates.

=== Authentic Leadership Inventory ===
Neider and Schriesheim developed the Authentic Leadership Inventory (ALI) as a 16-item measure of follower perceptions of authentic leadership. Like the ALQ, the inventory assesses self-awareness, internalised moral perspective, balanced processing, and relational transparency. Its development drew on the theoretical structure established by Walumbwa et al. while providing an alternative operationalisation and validation strategy. The complete ALI items are reported in the published article, making the scale readily reproducible for research. In a 2026 meta-analysis, choice between the ALI and ALQ moderated few of the relationships examined; Lux et al. concluded that researchers could generally use the freely available ALI without material consequence, while noting several correlate-specific differences.

=== Authentic Leadership Questionnaire ===
Walumbwa et al. developed the Authentic Leadership Questionnaire (ALQ) as a 16-item measure aligned with their four-dimensional model of authentic leadership. Followers typically complete the questionnaire by rating the extent to which a leader demonstrates self-awareness, an internalised moral perspective, balanced processing, and relational transparency, although a self-report version also exists. The ALQ became the most widely used measure during the growth of authentic leadership research and helped establish the four-dimensional model as the dominant empirical representation of the construct. The complete instrument is copyrighted and distributed through Mind Garden, with only sample items available publicly. Subsequent methodological debate has examined the extent to which leadership questionnaires capture observable behaviour separately from respondents’ evaluations and inferred intentions, an issue that extends beyond authentic leadership to leadership-style measurement more broadly.

=== Leader authenticity scales ===
Earlier instruments assessed leader authenticity before the four-dimensional model became established. Henderson and Hoy developed the Leader Authenticity Scale (LAS) to examine whether leaders behaved in accordance with their own values rather than allowing formal roles or organisational pressures to dominate their conduct. The scale also assessed accountability and the avoidance of manipulative behaviour, although later reviews questioned its generalisability because of the restricted samples used during development. Measures of personal authenticity have also been applied to leaders. Kernis and Goldman’s Authenticity Inventory assesses awareness, unbiased processing, behaviour, and relational orientation at the individual level. It measures personal authenticity rather than authentic leadership itself, but its conceptual structure influenced later leadership formulations and illustrates the psychological foundations from which the leadership construct developed.

== Empirical evidence and nomological network ==
Researchers have mapped authentic leadership within a broad nomological network of leader attributes, relational processes, contextual conditions, and work-related outcomes. Gardner et al. coded 768 hypotheses across 205 quantitative studies and found that researchers had examined authentic leadership as a predictor, outcome, mediator, and moderator across a wide range of organisational relationships. Several meta-analyses have synthesised portions of this literature, including studies of construct redundancy, emotional intelligence, work engagement across cultures, and cultural differences across a broader range of relationships. The latest cross-cultural meta-analysis synthesised 292 independent samples from 273 papers, comprising 100,641 participants from more than 40 countries and 35 attitudinal, behavioural, and performance correlates.

The accumulated evidence supports a substantial set of associations around authentic leadership, while leaving the causal ordering of many relationships unresolved. Gardner et al. found that 445 of 569 hypothesised relationships between authentic leadership and dependent variables received empirical support, but also identified widespread reliance on cross-sectional surveys, single-source data, and models that omit plausible confounds. Lux et al. reached a similar conclusion from the meta-analytic evidence. Across the studies they synthesised, 70.5% used cross-sectional designs, 17.8% incorporated time lags, 19.9% used multiple raters, and only 8.2% combined the latter two approaches. The resulting associations therefore map the empirical network around authentic leadership more securely than they establish causal effects.

=== Antecedents ===
Research on the antecedents of authentic leadership remains less developed than research on its outcomes. Early theory located authentic leadership in processes of self-knowledge and self-regulation, and Peus et al. subsequently found that leader self-knowledge and self-consistency predicted followers' perceptions of authentic leadership across business and research settings. Contemporary formulations distinguish these enabling characteristics from authentic leadership itself. Under the signalling definition, qualities or conditions that make authentic leadership behaviour more likely belong within its antecedent network rather than its definition. Gardner et al. found that mindfulness was the most frequently examined predictor of authentic leadership in the recent literature, while leader and rater gender also received repeated attention, although the authors judged the overall antecedent evidence too limited for strong causal conclusions.

Emotional intelligence has received the clearest dedicated meta-analytic examination as a potential leader antecedent. Miao et al. found an overall corrected correlation of .49 between emotional intelligence and authentic leadership, but the relationship depended strongly on how emotional intelligence was measured. Self-report and mixed measures produced correlations of .52 and .49, respectively, while ability-based measures produced a correlation of only .08. The divergence indicates that the observed relationship partly reflects measurement and rating processes rather than a uniform association between emotional ability and authentic leadership. Beyond individual characteristics, studies have also examined organisational conditions such as ethical climate as potential antecedents, although Gardner et al. treat the antecedent evidence as less developed than the extensive body of research examining follower responses.

Variables examined as antecedents include: self-knowledge, self-consistency, emotional intelligence, mindfulness, leader characteristics, and ethical climate.

=== Mediators ===
Research on mediating mechanisms examines the processes through which authentic leadership becomes associated with follower and organisational outcomes. Gardner et al. identified 209 mediation hypotheses in the literature, of which 159 received empirical support. Trust was the most frequently proposed mediator, appearing in 20 hypotheses, followed by engagement, psychological capital, empowerment, work-life balance, leader-member exchange, and person-job fit. Trust also appeared in early process models. Peus et al. found that followers' perceptions of leader predictability, treated as a facet of trust, mediated relationships between authentic leadership and work-related attitudes as well as perceived team effectiveness. This recurring emphasis reflects the relational character of authentic leadership, in which followers interpret information about leaders before forming attitudes towards them and their organisations.

Later work has distinguished several stages within this relational process. Lux et al. found that perceptions of authentic leadership were associated with followers' personal identification with their leader and affect-based trust, which in turn operated through affective organisational commitment to explain variation in work engagement and job satisfaction. Personal identification captures the extent to which followers incorporate aspects of the leader into their own self-concept, while affect-based trust reflects an emotional willingness to accept vulnerability within the relationship. Organisational commitment extends this process beyond the leader-follower dyad by connecting the relationship with followers' attachment to their organisation. These mechanisms offer a sequential account in which followers first interpret and relate to the leader, then carry aspects of that relationship into their wider experience of work. Contemporary signalling theory provides a compatible framework because signals exert influence through their interpretation by recipients rather than through their transmission alone.

The mediation literature remains difficult to disentangle because several proposed mechanisms correlate strongly with one another and often appear in separate models. Gardner et al. note that trust, empowerment, engagement, leader-member exchange, and psychological capital have frequently been tested in isolation, making it difficult to establish which processes account for unique explanatory variance. A construct can also occupy different positions across theoretical models. Organisational commitment, for example, has been studied both as an outcome of authentic leadership and as a mediator connecting leader-follower relationships with subsequent work experiences. The nomological network therefore describes several plausible pathways rather than a settled causal sequence.

Variables examined as mediators include: trust, personal identification, organisational commitment, leader-member exchange, empowerment, psychological capital, work engagement, work-life balance, and person-job fit.

=== Moderators ===
Contextual research examines when relationships involving authentic leadership become stronger, weaker, or take different forms. National culture currently provides the most developed meta-analytic evidence among contextual boundary conditions. Lux et al. tested five cultural dimensions across 35 authentic leadership relationships using 292 samples from more than 40 countries. At least one cultural value moderated 15 of the 35 relationships, or 42.9%, while 57.1% showed no detected cultural moderation. Individualism and masculinity strengthened several relationships, while power distance, uncertainty avoidance, and long-term orientation attenuated some others. Several interactions ran in the opposite direction to theoretical predictions, indicating that cultural effects depend on the particular follower response under examination rather than following a single East-West pattern.

The cultural results illustrate how followers' expectations can shape responses to the same leadership behaviour. Lux et al. integrate culturally endorsed implicit leadership theory with social identity theory to propose that followers evaluate leader signals against culturally informed ideas about appropriate leadership. Signals that accord with these expectations can strengthen identification and endorsement, while incongruent signals can weaken the relationship. A narrower meta-analysis by Li et al. found that power distance strengthened the relationship between authentic leadership and work engagement, contrary to its authors' prediction, while other cultural dimensions produced no comparable interaction for that relationship. The later evidence therefore supports cultural embeddedness while resisting a universal claim that any single cultural characteristic increases or decreases authentic leadership effectiveness across all outcomes.

Research design is also associated with differences in some observed relationships. Lux et al. found differences between the ALQ and ALI for several correlates, including organisational identification and work engagement, while time-lagged or multirater designs yielded weaker associations for some relationships involving leader-member exchange, trust, and creativity. These patterns indicate that apparent boundary conditions can arise from how authentic leadership and its correlates are measured as well as from characteristics of leaders, followers, or settings. Beyond culture and method, Gardner et al. found that studies have examined follower values, identification, competency, other leader behaviours, and features of leader-follower interactions as moderators, although no comparable evidence base has accumulated around most of these variables.

Variables examined as moderators include: individualism, masculinity, power distance, uncertainty avoidance, long-term orientation, follower values, identification, competency, other leader behaviours, measurement instrument, and research design.

=== Outcomes ===
Authentic leadership has been associated with outcomes involving followers’ relationships with leaders, their attitudes towards work and organisations, workplace behaviour, and performance. Lux et al. found reliable relationships for 33 of the 35 correlates they meta-analysed, with both the 95% confidence interval and 80% credibility interval excluding zero. Psychological safety and perceptions of the work environment were the two exceptions under this criterion. Among leader-related attitudes, the largest corrected correlations were satisfaction with the supervisor (ρ = .704), trust (ρ = .665), leader-member exchange (ρ = .603), and personal identification (ρ = .571).

Positive follower attitudes also show consistent associations. Authentic leadership correlated with organisational justice (ρ = .577), empowerment (ρ = .570), job satisfaction (ρ = .566), psychological capital (ρ = .504), well-being (ρ = .480), organisational commitment (ρ = .461), and work engagement (ρ = .454) in the 2026 meta-analysis. Negative work experiences moved in the opposite direction, including turnover intention (ρ = −.307), bullying, counterproductive work behaviour, or deviance (ρ = −.306), and burnout or stress (ρ = −.294). Authentic leadership was also positively related to follower behaviour, including knowledge sharing (ρ = .480), innovative behaviour (ρ = .419), voice (ρ = .409), and organisational citizenship behaviour (ρ = .374). Performance associations ranged from creativity (ρ = .445) and role performance (ρ = .337) to perceived organisational performance (ρ = .562), although the latter estimate rests on fewer studies.

Earlier meta-analyses reached compatible conclusions while placing these associations within the wider leadership literature. Banks et al. synthesised 100 independent samples involving 25,452 participants and found authentic leadership associated with follower attitudes and performance criteria, alongside a strong relationship with transformational leadership (ρ = .72). Authentic leadership carried greater relative weight for organisational citizenship behaviour and group or organisational performance, while transformational leadership carried greater weight for several follower-level criteria. Hoch et al. similarly found strong empirical overlap between authentic and transformational leadership and limited incremental variance across many outcomes. These findings establish a broad empirical network around authentic leadership while also motivating continuing work on construct differentiation, discussed below under its relationship with other leadership theories.

Variables examined as outcomes include: trust, satisfaction with supervisor, leader-member exchange, personal identification, empowerment, job satisfaction, organisational commitment, organisational identification, organisational justice, psychological capital, well-being, work engagement, burnout, turnover intention, workplace deviance, innovative behaviour, knowledge sharing, organisational citizenship behaviour, employee voice, creativity, role performance, extra-role performance, and organisational performance.

== Authentic leadership development ==
Authentic leadership has been conceptualised as a developmental process rather than a fixed trait or end state. Early models proposed that leaders develop authenticity through increasing self-awareness and self-regulation, shaped by personal experiences and the meanings they assign to them. Life stories occupy a central place in this account. Shamir and Eilam argued that leaders construct an understanding of who they are as leaders by interpreting formative experiences and integrating them into their evolving self-concept. Critical or “trigger” events can prompt reflection by challenging established assumptions about identity, values, or leadership practice. Development therefore involves an iterative process of reflection, sense-making, and self-construal through which leaders continue to reinterpret their experiences and refine how they understand themselves.

The four dimensions provide corresponding areas for development. Leaders can strengthen self-awareness by reflecting on their experiences and seeking feedback that reveals how others experience their behaviour. Developing an internalised moral perspective involves examining personal values and learning to maintain principled conduct when external pressures pull in another direction. Balanced processing develops through practices that expose leaders’ assumptions to challenge, including inviting disagreement and reconsidering decisions when new information warrants revision. Relational transparency requires leaders to communicate their views with candour while learning where openness should give way to legitimate boundaries of confidentiality or responsibility. These processes make authentic leadership development behavioural as well as introspective, since greater self-understanding becomes leadership relevant when expressed through interactions with others.

Contemporary theory extends this developmental account by treating leader identity as dynamic. Leaders occupy multiple individual, relational, and collective identities whose salience can shift across situations, and authentic leadership may take different forms as leaders regulate which aspects of themselves they bring forward. Role expectations create further constraints. Kark and Cohen’s concept of “bounded authenticity” describes how leaders balance self-expression with the demands attached to formal leadership positions. Development under this view involves learning to navigate identity and role tensions while maintaining concordance between values and enacted leadership. The signalling perspective accommodates such adaptation because concordance requires alignment between leaders’ values and the signals they send rather than repetition of the same behaviour across situations. Authentic leadership development can therefore involve greater behavioural flexibility without requiring leaders to abandon the principles that organise their conduct.

Development also has a relational dimension because followers participate in the interpretation of authentic leadership. Leaders may intend to express self-awareness or transparency, yet followers encounter these qualities through the behaviour and communication available to them. Contemporary development therefore extends beyond private self-reflection towards learning how values and self-understanding become expressed in ways that others can recognise and interpret. Cultural context further shapes that process, since the same authentic leadership behaviour can resonate differently with followers who hold different expectations about authority or interpersonal openness. Although authentic leadership theory has long treated development as possible, research establishing which interventions produce sustained changes remains less developed than research examining correlates and outcomes. Reviews consequently call for longitudinal and experimental designs capable of testing developmental processes and behavioural change with stronger causal inference.

== Relationship to other leadership theories ==
Authentic leadership emerged alongside a wider group of contemporary leadership theories that emphasise values and the relationship between leaders and followers. It shares conceptual territory with transformational, ethical, and servant leadership, while each approach specifies a different basis for leadership influence. Transformational leadership focuses on motivating followers to transcend immediate self-interest in pursuit of collective objectives. Ethical leadership centres on normatively appropriate conduct and the reinforcement of ethical standards, while servant leadership places follower and stakeholder welfare at the centre of the leadership process. Authentic leadership instead focuses on concordance between leaders’ values and the signals through which they express self-awareness, internalised moral perspective, balanced processing, and relational transparency. These distinctions allow the same leader behaviour to reflect more than one leadership process without making the underlying constructs equivalent.

Lemoine et al. distinguish authentic, ethical, and servant leadership through their underlying approaches to morality. They associate ethical leadership with deontology, because it emphasises adherence to moral norms and standards, and servant leadership with consequentialism, because it prioritises the welfare and outcomes of followers and other stakeholders. Authentic leadership aligns most closely with virtue ethics, reflecting its emphasis on self-awareness, self-concordance, and the moral courage to act consistently with one’s values. The three theories therefore address different questions about moral leadership. Ethical leadership emphasises whether conduct conforms to appropriate standards, servant leadership directs attention towards whom leadership serves, and authentic leadership focuses on the relationship between leaders’ values and their enacted conduct.

These theoretical distinctions have proved harder to preserve in empirical research. Lemoine et al. found extensive commonality in the outcomes, mediating mechanisms, and measures used to study authentic, ethical, and servant leadership. Researchers often invoked similar explanations for their effects and tested the constructs against similar desirable outcomes, while scale content also showed points of overlap. The authors consequently distinguished between conceptual differentiation, which remained clear in the foundational theories, and empirical differentiation, which had received weaker treatment in much of the subsequent literature. They argued against collapsing the approaches into a single moral leadership construct because their theoretical foundations contain meaningful differences that empirical research can test more directly. This distinction forms part of a broader measurement debate about whether ostensibly separate leadership constructs and their measures provide sufficient incremental information beyond closely related approaches.

A major meta-analytic comparison involving authentic leadership has been with transformational leadership. Banks et al. synthesised 100 independent samples involving 25,452 participants and found a meta-analytic correlation of ρ = .72 between the constructs. Neither added substantial incremental validity beyond the other across the outcomes examined, although relative-weight analyses revealed some differentiation. Transformational leadership accounted for greater relative variance in follower satisfaction, satisfaction with the leader, task performance, and leader effectiveness, while authentic leadership carried greater relative weight for organisational citizenship behaviour and group or organisational performance. Hoch et al. extended this comparison by examining authentic, ethical, and servant leadership alongside transformational leadership. Authentic and ethical leadership again showed considerable empirical overlap with transformational leadership and limited incremental validity across many outcomes, while servant leadership displayed greater differentiation.

Taken together, these studies distinguish empirical overlap from theoretical redundancy. Lemoine et al. show that authentic, ethical, and servant leadership originate from different moral logics even though empirical studies have often operationalised them through similar favourable evaluations of leaders. Banks et al. and Hoch et al. reveal a related measurement and discriminant-validity problem when these approaches are compared with transformational leadership. Contemporary leadership scholarship has responded by calling for greater attention to discrete leader behaviour and clearer separation of behaviour from inferred intentions, evaluations, and effects. The signalling definition of authentic leadership follows this direction by specifying a narrower theoretical object: concordant, values-based leader signalling through its four dimensions. This provides a behavioural basis for testing when authentic leadership converges with neighbouring theories and when it describes a distinct leadership process.

== Critical perspectives ==
Authentic leadership has attracted sustained criticism alongside its empirical growth. Ford and Harding challenged the possibility of locating leadership authenticity in a stable “true self”, while Alvesson and Einola questioned the construct’s philosophical foundations, its association with positive psychology, and the assumption that authenticity necessarily carries moral or organisational benefits. Gardner et al. subsequently brought proponents and critics into direct dialogue, clarifying areas of agreement while preserving disagreement over the construct’s theoretical foundations and practical utility. The debate increasingly centred on whether authentic leadership could retain its emphasis on self-concordant leadership while accommodating contemporary understandings of identity as dynamic and socially situated.

This critical phase was consolidated in a 2021 special issue of Leadership edited by Iszatt-White, Carroll, Gardiner, and Kempster. Its framing article, “Do we need authentic leadership?”, questioned whether the construct remained fit for purpose as a basis for leadership theory and practice. The editors argued that authentic leadership had struggled to fulfil some of its functionalist and instrumentalist ambitions while remaining vulnerable to philosophical objections about the nature of the “true self” and the complexities of enacting authenticity in organisational life. The issue combined empirical articles with conceptual “Leading Questions” contributions and was intended to subject authenticity in leadership to sustained critical examination. Lux and Lowe later characterised this period as a retrospective phase in which scholars reconsidered the merits and limitations of further pursuing the construct rather than primarily developing new authentic leadership theory.

A recurring criticism involves the tension between expressing the self and fulfilling a leadership role. Leaders operate within expectations attached to hierarchy, gender, professional responsibilities, and organisational membership, which can constrain what they reveal or how they act. Unqualified self-expression may conflict with follower needs or role obligations, while behavioural adaptation can appear inconsistent with traditional conceptions of authenticity. Recent theory addresses this tension by replacing a singular, fixed self with a dynamic account of leader identity. Bunjak et al. model authenticity through shifting individual, relational, and collective identities, while Kark and Cohen describe “bounded authenticity” as the balance between self-expression and formal role requirements. These formulations preserve congruence between values and conduct while allowing its behavioural expression to change across contexts.

Measurement has generated another major line of critique. Most authentic leadership research relies on followers’ questionnaire ratings, which capture perceptions of leaders rather than direct observations of behaviour or independent access to leaders’ internal states. Scale items can therefore combine descriptions of behaviour with evaluations of its quality, presumed intentions, or anticipated effects. Fischer and Sitkin identify this broader problem as valence-based conflation across leadership-style research. Lux and Lowe similarly argue that the Walumbwa et al. definition blurred authentic leadership with antecedents such as positive psychological capacities and outcomes such as self-development, leaving uncertainty over what discrete leadership behaviour researchers were measuring. One influential 2012 study in The Leadership Quarterly was subsequently retracted after re-analysis failed to reproduce its reported results and identified serious reporting errors and model misspecifications; the retraction notice stated that intentional wrongdoing should not be inferred.

Questions about causal inference extend beyond measurement. Much of the empirical literature establishes associations between perceived authentic leadership and follower outcomes using cross-sectional data, leaving reverse causality and omitted-variable explanations unresolved. Lux et al. found that 70.5% of studies in their meta-analytic sample used cross-sectional designs, while only 8.2% combined time-lagged and multirater approaches. Experimental evidence has begun to address this limitation. Dadich et al. identified 16 experiments across 11 publications and argued that experimental designs can isolate causal relationships involving manipulated authentic leadership while calling for sequential experiments and broader methodological approaches. The methodological debate therefore bears most directly on the strength of causal claims made from the existing evidence rather than on whether authentic leadership correlates with workplace attitudes and behaviour. Lux and Lowe similarly position stronger behavioural specification and experimental methods as part of the field’s methodological development.

Lux and Lowe frame the progression from the 2019 critique through the 2021 Leadership special issue and the 2024 20-year review as a movement from critical reassessment towards theoretical reconstruction. They argue that scientific progress requires both challenging established assumptions and proposing stronger alternatives, and frame the special issue around that complementary task. The special issue thus retains criticism of fixed conceptions of the self, positive valence, contextual insensitivity, and weak causal designs while proposing revised theoretical responses. The signalling definition removes presumed positive outcomes from the construct and directs attention towards discrete behaviour; Bunjak et al. provide a dynamic identity account; Kark and Cohen introduce bounded authenticity; and Dadich et al. advance experimental approaches. Contemporary debate consequently encompasses both continuing criticism of authentic leadership and efforts to reformulate the construct in ways that address those criticisms.

== Future research ==
Recent reviews place behavioural specification at the centre of the future authentic leadership agenda. Gardner et al. concluded from their systematic review of 303 articles that much of the literature still falls short of contemporary standards for research design and construct specification, and they adopted signalling theory as a basis for further development. Lux and Lowe similarly call for researchers to identify the discrete behaviours through which leaders signal self-awareness, internalised moral perspective, balanced processing, and relational transparency. Banks et al. place this recommendation within a broader movement in leadership research towards distinguishing observable behaviour from psychological states, evaluations, and inferred intentions. Their review found that only 3% of variables coded across 214 leadership studies represented behaviour, illustrating the wider methodological problem facing leadership-style research.

Signal credibility and cost provide a related research direction. Connelly et al. argue that credible signals are costly to produce and difficult for actors lacking the underlying quality to imitate. Extending this logic to authentic leadership, Lux proposes examining the cognitive, emotional, social, and reputational costs incurred when leaders reflect on personal values, reveal limitations, remain open to dissent, or express uncertainty. The proposal treats such costs as a possible source of signal credibility and asks how leaders experience and manage them across organisational settings. Lux draws an explicit parallel with adjacent work conceptualising charisma as a costly signal and proposes testing when authentic leadership signals impose meaningful costs and how those costs shape the leadership process.

A second theoretical direction treats authenticity as dynamic and bounded rather than static. Bunjak et al. conceptualise leaders as moving among individual, relational, and collective identities whose salience changes with circumstances, using self-regulation to maintain authenticity while different aspects of the self become active. Kark and Cohen likewise show how leadership roles place boundaries around self-expression, requiring leaders to reconcile personal identity with expectations attached to authority and position. Lux identifies dynamic and bounded authenticity as distinct avenues for extending the signalling account. Together, these accounts call for research on how concordance is maintained as the behaviours through which values are expressed change, how leaders manage conflicts among identities, and when adaptation is interpreted as responsive leadership rather than inconsistency.

Greater attention to followers and context follows from this dynamic account. Signals acquire meaning through interpretation, so the same leader behaviour may communicate different qualities to different audiences. Lux et al. provide meta-analytic evidence that cultural values moderate a substantial minority of relationships involving authentic leadership, while many others remain comparatively stable across countries. Lux identifies diverse follower cohorts as a further research avenue, including variation associated with age, culture, gender, and other demographic characteristics. That agenda proposes examining how followers’ identities, implicit leadership theories, and relational histories shape signal interpretation, and how leaders adapt the expression of authentic leadership while remaining concordant with their underlying values.

Digital leadership environments create a related set of questions about how authentic leadership is communicated. Lux and Lowe and Lux identify digital environments as an underdeveloped setting for authentic leadership research. Video conferencing, instant messaging, asynchronous communication, and collaboration platforms mediate leader–follower interaction while changing the verbal and non-verbal cues available to recipients. Their research agenda asks how leaders signal relational transparency, self-awareness, and the other dimensions when interactions occur through digital channels, and whether followers interpret those signals differently from comparable face-to-face behaviour. This direction focuses attention on how communication media shape the transmission and reception of authentic leadership signals without assuming that the underlying dimensions themselves change.

Methodological development remains necessary alongside these theoretical questions. Dadich et al. identified 16 experiments across 11 publications in their review of experimental authentic leadership research and highlighted opportunities for sequential experiments, multi-method studies, online experimentation, and immersive technologies. Experimental work can isolate specific leader behaviours and trace the sequence from signal exposure through follower interpretation to subsequent attitudes and behaviour, providing stronger tests of mechanisms than global questionnaire ratings alone. Longitudinal and behavioural designs can complement these experiments by examining how authentic leadership signals accumulate, change, or lose credibility across repeated interactions. Taken together, current reviews and research agendas call for greater conceptual precision alongside designs capable of testing what leaders do, how recipients interpret those behaviours, which conditions alter their meaning, and what consequences can be attributed to them with credible causal evidence.
