= Vertical dyad linkage theory =

Leadership theory

The Vertical Dyad Linkage Theory is a theory that deals with the individual dyadic relationships formed between leaders and their subordinates. It is also widely known as The Leadership-Member Exchange (LMX) Theory. Originally, the theory has been developed by Fred Dansereau, George Graen and William J. Haga, in 1975.

== Concept ==
The theory focuses on types of leader-subordinate relationships which are further classified into subgroups, namely the in-group and the out-group. The in-group consists of members that receive greater responsibilities and encouragement, and are able to express opinions without having any restrictions. Their ideas are frequently considered by the leader, to the extent of being influenced in his decision-making process. Additionally, the in-group members are able to obtain more access to resources. Researchers' findings reveal that forming relationships between the leader and in-group individuals supports the process of procuring and exchanging information within the team or the entire organisation, due to the absence of communication barriers, such as the personality differences that exist between the manager and the out-group members. The out-group relationship is more formal, being based on the contract of employment. Members that belong to this category are generally disfavoured by the leader. Thus, their viewpoints and ideas are less likely to be accepted. Furthermore, they may not have full access to resources and are allocated fewer responsibilities that rank lower on the subject of importance.

== The stages of relationships ==
In the Vertical Dyad Linkage Theory, the relationship between the manager and the subordinates is constructed in three stages.

=== Role-taking stage ===
In the first stage, individuals become members of the team and meet their leader. A principal activity carried out by the leader is describing his expectations to the subordinates, with regards to the way they should undertake their individual responsibilities and carry out their roles. Furthermore, it is the stage that represents an opportunity for the subordinates to demonstrate their qualities, by putting into practice their set of skills and using their knowledge. In addition, the leader observes and analyses how capable are the team members, what abilities they have and how they are able to contribute to the team in order to have a successful outcome. In the Role-taking part, both the leader and the members are able to state their general beliefs, as well as "understand how the other views and desires respect."(Djawijah, S. 2013. Lmx leader [online]. LinkedIn Corporation. Available from: [Accessed 2 November 2015]).

=== Role-making stage ===
The new members of the team are integrated within the team by starting to work with existent members, as part of the second phase. The Role-making stage represents the occasion to prove their work ethics, by fully contributing with ideas and research to the project that has been set. The members also demonstrate their capability to closely collaborate with the other individuals from the team, as well as how reliable and devoted they are to the leader. Hence, it represents the most opportune stage for the leader to determine how the members will be segregated into the two subgroups. Evidently, the members that have the most input and are assimilated to the leader, will be part of the in-group. Nevertheless, in cases of being disloyal to the leader, the individuals that have been categorised in the in-group are very likely to be asserted to the out-group. Team members can also be assigned to the out-group if they are proven to be inefficient and unambitious, negatively impacting the execution of the project.

=== Role-routinization stage ===
Routines amongst the members and the leader are likely to occur in the final stage. In order to continue to be perceived as excellent team members by the leader, the in-group individuals display admiration, reliance and perseverance. Furthermore, "mutual and high quality leader and subordinate exchanges" (Ngo, D. 2012. LMX Presentation [online]. LinkedIn Corporation. Available from: http://www.slideshare.net/gutierrezdaisy/lmx-presentation?related=1. [Accessed 2 November 2015]) take place, developing the relationships within the team. The organisation environment can be improved by the exchanges that take place at this stage, as they lead to modernization and generally a more positive workplace. In a study of individuals at the workplace carried out by Erdogan, Bauer and Walter (2015), it is discussed that the in-group members, who experience high-quality exchanges with the leader, are very likely to be solicited by the other team members, which belong to the out-group. The reason for this is that in-group members are strongly connected to the manager. As a result, the out-group individuals establish further relationships with the in-group, in order to reach the leader easier and ultimately communicate more effectively with him. As the out-group members establish positive relationships with the manager, this may represent a method of being able to exit their subgroup and become part of the in-group. (Erdogan B, Bauer T., Walter J. 2015. Deeds that help and words that hurt: Helping and gossip as moderators of the relationship between leader-member exchange and advice network centrality. Personnel Psychology. 68. p. 185-214). Ultimately, the out-group individuals can understand how the leader favours the team members and may feel dissatisfied with his leadership style. Therefore, they may have the desire to leave the team or the current workplace.

== In-group and out-group development ==
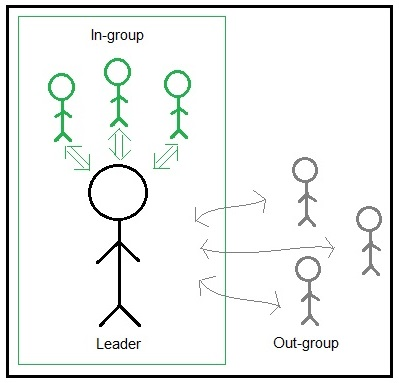
How relationships are formed between the leader and the subgroups in a team, according to the Vertical Dyad Linkage Theory.

The leader focuses on several factors upon the establishment of the in-group and the out-group. Members are observed and categorized based on their characteristics, how effective is their collaboration with the leader, their achievements and how they take on responsibilities. Moreover, if common traits are identified between a member and the leader, it is most probable that the respective member will be assigned to the in-group. A wide array of common traits are considered acceptable by the leader, from personal characteristics and work style, to level of creativity and interests. Researchers have discovered that the allocation of members into the in-group and out-group can further depend on race, sex, ethnicity or religion. The outcome of the relationships between the leader and the subordinates is impacted by the latter factors. In this manner, if resemblance in the factors is identified, the relationships are more likely to be positive and prosperous.

== Application of the Vertical Dyad Linkage Theory ==
While the theory is adopted in various organisations, there are multiple benefits and downsides of putting it into practice. Extended explanations of how the Vertical Dyad Linkage Theory can positively impact the communication within the team or how inequality may arise, can be found below.

=== Advantages ===
The most benefits are experienced by the in-group members, as they are favoured by their leader. The individuals that belong to the in-group are often providing guidance and assist the leader. Thus, the leader is able to understand that the in-group subordinates are devoted and demonstrate competency in the decision-making process. In addition, due to their engaging behaviour and full participation in completing their tasks and responsibilities, the in-group members have high chances of receiving more positive comments, following the evaluation of their performance, executed by the leader. However, there are tendencies of amplifying the assessment results of the in-group individuals even in various cases of less satisfactory work outcomes. Fundamentally, the leader may overestimate the work quality presented by the in-group members, as a result of their existent solid connections. On the other hand, it is possible for the member to discover that the leader does not display similar personal traits. As a result, the subordinate may assess the relationship at a lower quality (Huang, Wright, Chiu, & Wang, 2008).

Furthermore, the theory can be easily applied in real life situations at the workplace. The manager of the team has the ability to identify the personal characteristics of each in-group and out-group individual, as well as the work principles they adhere to. Differences between the leader's and the subordinates' behaviour and mentality can potentially be determined since the first social interaction opportunities occur. As a result, the segregation of the team members into the two subgroups represents an uncomplicated process. In addition, the application of the Vertical Dyad Linkage Theory is likely to improve "mutual trust, confidence, job satisfaction, organizational commitment, common bonds, open communication, independence, respect, rewards & recognition." (Babou, S. 2008. Leader-Member Exchange (LMX) Theory [online]. Automattic Inc. Available from: https://leadershipchamps.wordpress.com/tag/vdl-theory/. [Accessed 1 November 2015]).

Finally, the communication aspect of a team is developed succeeding the application of the theory. Essentially, the interaction between the manager and the in-group subordinates becomes more effective and abundant once the division of the subgroups has been carried out. In the case that the Vertical Dyad Linkage Theory is not put into practice, the communication amongst the entire team is prone to remaining formal. Hence, the possibility of developing close relationships exists at a minimum level. This can further impact the performance of the team to the extent of inferior work quality, lack of loyalty and negligence of responsibilities.

=== Disadvantages ===
The core of the theory focuses on the construction of the in-group and out-group. As the allocation of the individuals into the respective subgroups is executed on the basis of several factors such as gender, ethnicity or achievements, the theory can be perceived as being discriminating. The separation of the subgroups that is based on the respective factors encourages the team individuals to have expectations of how each subgroup is likely to achieve. The performance can vary between working at a high competitive level and giving unsatisfactory input. Ultimately, this segregation method can negatively impact the behaviour and outcome of the team. Moreover, "it is often hard to convince that such segregation is indeed intended to promote organizational citizenship of the out-group and would not be used for any other purpose." (G.A. 2009. Leader Member Exchange [online]. Practical Management. Available from: http://www.practical-management.com/Leadership-Development/Leader-Member-Exchange.html [Accessed 1 November 2015]).

Another disadvantage represents the lack of equality within the team. The in-group individuals receive full attention from the leader, especially when contributing with opinions and suggestions upon the completion of work duties. As a result, the in-group is likely to provide more positive outcomes and a greater amount of work. Furthermore, due to the demonstration of the abilities they own, special treatment such as job promotion is applied for the in-group members. On the other hand, the out-group individuals and the leader do not exchange information and ideas frequently, due to absence of attention, leading to less successful communication. Hence, the individuals from the two subgroups are not treated similarly, nor are given identical opportunities to prove their capabilities at the workplace. This can potentially occur even in situations that demonstrate out-group individuals have expanded their knowledge and set of skills while working in the team.

== Enhancement proposal ==
Writer Gupta Ashim has published several arguments on the possibility of developing The Vertical Dyad Linkage Theory. The arguments concentrate on four elements: determining the out-group, investigating the level of determination, eliminate the lack of ambition and establish collaborations.

The out-group of the team must be established by the leader. An assessment of the out-group individuals' accomplishments can be carried out. The development of the assessment may include the work methods used by the out-group subordinates in other organisations, in order to complete daily tasks. Furthermore, the leader should display interest in finding the personal traits and features of the individuals, gaining an understanding of their passions and mindset. As a result of the in-depth analysis of the out-group, more balance between the subgroups is created.

Another method of enhancement consists of creating a mentoring programme. It allows the leader and the subordinate to communicate in different circumstances, suitable for exploring the subordinate's professional objectives and what type of work assignments he favours. Essentially, a mentoring meeting represents an opportunity for a closer communication. While one of the purposes of this method is to understand the readiness of the subordinate in carrying out supplementary duties, it also provides feedback for the leader, guiding him on whether he should continue using the current style of leadership or further improve it.

The elimination of de-motivation results in a more equilibrated theory. Several ways to reach a high level of enthusiasm within the team are by continuing to concentrate on the leader-subordinate interaction, by identifying similarities between the leader and the subgroup individuals and by producing concise tasks, as well as clearly stating the expected outcome.

Finally, close cooperation between the leader and the team members is encouraged. This is reached more effectively while the role-routinization stage is in progress, due to the demonstration of reliance and trustworthy connections that have been developed.

== Conclusion ==
The principle of the Vertical Dyad Linkage Theory is that in a team-based project, the manager forms distinctive relationships with his subordinates. Team members that display a similar behaviour as the leader are categorised as in-group individuals, whereas the rest of the members are part of the out-group, having difficulties in creating a close relationship with their manager.

In order to establish the subgroups, the leader takes into account elements such as gender and ethnicity, as well as their behaviour and the enthusiasm for extra duties.

The theory can be applied quickly, as the leader observes the team members' attitude and style from the first interaction. Leader-member relationships are simply established based on three stages: role-making, role-taking and role-routinization. Each stage allows the relationships to be further developed and have a positive impact upon the communication aspect and completion of tasks.

A couple of techniques can be implemented in order to improve the theory. Activities such as evaluating the subordinates' previous achievements and introducing mentorship support the process of forming positive connections between individuals.

== See also ==
- Social identity theory
- Leadership
- Teamwork
- Personality
- Dyad (sociology)
- Leader–member exchange theory
