= Civic virtue (organizational citizenship behavior dimension) =

Civic virtue is one of the five dimensions of organizational citizenship behavior (OCB) identified in Dennis Organ's prominent 1988 definition of the construct. Originally, Smith, Organ, and Near (1983) first proposed two dimensions: altruism and general compliance. Later, Organ (1988) deconstructed the dimension of general compliance and added additional dimensions of OCB. This resulted in a five-factor model consisting of altruism, courtesy, conscientiousness, sportsmanship, and civic virtue.

== Construct definition ==
Civic virtue is characterized by behaviors that indicate an employee's deep concerns and active interest in the life of the organization (Law, Wong, & Chen, 2005). In general, this OCB dimension represents a macro-level interest in the organization as evidenced by positive involvement in the concerns of the organization. Civic virtue represents an employee's feeling of being part of the organizational whole in the same way a citizen feels a part of his or her country. An employee displaying civic virtue behaviors embraces the responsibilities of being a ‘citizen’ of the organization (Podsakoff, MacKenzie, Paine, & Bachrach, 2000). Employees exhibiting civic virtue behaviors are responsible members of the organization who actively engage in constructive involvement in the policies and governance of the organization (Organ, Podsakoff, & MacKenzie, 2006).

== Similar citizenship dimensions ==
Since Smith et al.’s original 1983 definition of organizational citizenship behavior, there has been a lack of consensus regarding the dimensionality of OCB. Although the five-factor model Organ outlined in 1988 is generally accepted, inconsistencies still remain. Within the Industrial and Organization Psychology literature, there are two main alternative dimensions with close ties to the civic virtue dimension of OCB: organizational participation and protecting the organization.

=== Organizational participation ===
Graham, in an essay on OCBs, outlines a politically centered approach to understanding OCBs (Graham, 1991). She proposes that by specifying the responsibilities of citizens in a geopolitical setting, researchers and practitioners can better understand OCBs in an organizational setting. Specifically, Graham outlines three categories of citizenship responsibilities (citizenship behaviors) that citizens (employees) have with one another and their community (organization): obedience, loyalty, and participation. It is within the participation component that researchers and practitioners find concepts similar to civic virtue. Graham provides a definition of organizational participation: “interest in organizational affairs guided by ideal standards of virtue, validated by keeping informed, and expressed through full and responsible involvement in organizational governance” (Graham, 1991, p. 255). Examples of this citizenship responsibility dimension include attending non-required meetings, sharing opinions and new ideas with others in the organization, and a willingness to deliver bad news or support and unpopular view to combat groupthink (Graham, 1991). This citizenship responsibility dimension closely resembles the civic virtue dimension of OCB.

=== Protecting the organization ===
George and Jones (1997) provide another conceptually similar behavioral dimension: protecting the organization. In their research, George and Jones present a construct similar to OCB: organizational spontaneity. Within this construct, they propose that there are five forms of organizational spontaneity: helping coworkers, protecting the organization, making constructive suggestions, developing oneself, and spreading goodwill. It is within the protecting the organization factor that researchers and practitioners find similarities to civic virtue. Protecting the organization is defined by George and Jones as “voluntary acts organizational members engage in to protect or save life and property ranging from reporting hazards, securely locking doors, and reporting suspicious or dangerous activities, to taking the initiative to halt a production process when there is the potential for human injury” (George & Jones, 1997, p. 155). They also include safeguarding organizational resources in this organizational spontaneity dimension (George & Jones, 1997). Again, this alternative dimension shares many similarities with the civic virtue dimension of OCB.

== Categorization of civic virtue behaviors ==
The construct of civic virtue has been operationalized in varying forms. On one side of the spectrum are mundane behaviors such as attending optional meetings, reading and answering work related emails, and participating in the traditions and rituals of the organization. The other side of the spectrum includes more extraordinary and rare forms of the construct such as voicing critiques of or objections to policies to higher-level members of the organization. This type of civic virtue can also be demonstrated on a larger scale by defending the organization's policies and practices when they are challenged by an outside source. This more challenging type of civic virtue has received the most empirical support. However, it has also been noted that this type of civic virtue might be less appreciated by managers, compared to other forms of OCB, as it causes disruption of the status quo (Organ et al., 2006). Organ (1988) remarked that although some in high positions may not value this form of OCB, it should not be disqualified.

Civic virtue has been even more granularly defined by dividing the behaviors into two distinct categories. The first, civic virtue-information, includes participating in meetings, reading documents containing information regarding the organization, and remaining on the lookout for incoming news. The second, civic virtue-influence, involves being proactive and making suggestions for change. Results from a paper by Graham and Van Dyne demonstrate empirical differences between civic-virtue informational and civic-virtue influence, which indicates the value of examining these categories separately (Graham & Van Dyne, 2006).

== Civic virtue and Individually and organizationally focused OCB ==
A different way of organizing the OCB construct was proposed by Williams and Anderson (1991). They divided up the construct into two different types of organizational citizenship behaviors based on whom the behaviors were directed towards. Organizational citizenship behavior–individuals (OCBI) are behaviors that are aimed at other individuals in the work place, while organizational citizenship behavior-organizational (OCBO) are behaviors directed at the organization as a whole. The concept of civic virtue falls squarely within the OCBO definition (Williams & Anderson, 1991).

== Civic virtue and gender ==
Civic virtue has also been categorized along gender lines. Research has shown the OCB dimensions of altruism and courtesy to be considered more in role behavior for females, while civic virtue and sportsmanship are regarded as more in role for men. The dimension of conscientiousness, which includes attention to detail and adherence to organizational rules, is excluded, as this dimension does not seem to adhere to any particular gender norms (Kidder & Parks, 2001).

== Antecedents ==
Empirical research in the area of OCBs has focused on four major categories of OCB antecedents: individual characteristics, task characteristics, organizational characteristics, and leadership behaviors (Podsakoff et al., 2000). The various antecedents of civic virtue specifically are listed below with their contributing empirical support.

=== Individual characteristic antecedents ===
Individual characteristic antecedents that have been studied regarding OCBs include employee attitudes, dispositional variables, employee role perceptions, demographic variables, and employee abilities and individual differences. Empirical evidence has linked civic virtue with employee attitudes, employee abilities, and individual differences. Specifically, empirical research has found that satisfaction and organizational commitment have positive and significant relationships with civic virtue (Podsakoff, MacKenzie, & Bommer, 1996a). Research also indicates a negative and significant relationship between indifference to rewards and civic virtue (Podsakoff et al., 1996a).

=== Task characteristic antecedents ===
Task characteristic antecedents that have been empirically studied include task feedback, task routinization, and intrinsically satisfying tasks. Research indicates that all three of these task characteristics have significant relationships with civic virtue (Podsakoff et al., 1996a). Research supports positive relationships between both task feedback and intrinsically satisfying tasks and civic virtue. Research conversely demonstrates a negative relationship between task routinization and civic virtue (Podsakoff et al., 1996a).

=== Organizational characteristic antecedents ===
Organizational characteristic antecedents that have been empirically studied regarding OCBs include organizational formalization, organizational inflexibility, advisory/staff support, cohesiveness of a group, rewards outside a leader's control, spatial distance from the leader, and perceived organizational support. In their 1996 meta-analysis, Podsakoff et al. found a positive and significant relationship between group cohesiveness and civic virtue. Organ and colleagues (2006) reanalyzed data in the above meta-analysis and found a negative and significant relationship between organizational formalization and civic virtue.

=== Leadership behavior antecedents ===
Leadership behaviors studied empirically regarding OCBs can be broken into transformational leadership behaviors, transactional leadership behaviors, behaviors consistent with path–goal theory, and behaviors consistent with leader–member exchange theory. Transformational leadership behaviors include “core” transformational leadership behaviors, articulating a vision, providing an appropriate model, fostering the acceptance of group goals, maintaining high performance expectations, and fostering intellectual stimulation. Empirical evidence indicates positive and significant relationships between articulating a vision, providing an appropriate model, and encouraging the acceptance of group goals and civic virtue (Podsakoff et al., 2000). Transactional leadership behaviors include contingent and noncontingent reward behaviors and contingent and noncontingent punishment behaviors. A positive and significant relationship has been found between contingent reward behavior and civic virtue (Podsakoff et al., 1996a). Behaviors consistent with the path–goal theory of leadership include leader role clarification, leader specification of procedures, and supportive leader behaviors. Empirical evidence indicates a positive and significant relationship between supportive leader behaviors and civic virtue (Podsakoff et al., 2000).

== Consequences ==
Empirical research regarding the consequences of OCBs has focused on two main areas: managerial evaluations of performance and organizational performance and success. Podsakoff and colleagues (2000) found, in a summary of empirical evidence regarding managerial performance evaluations and OCBs, that civic virtue was significantly related to performance evaluations in six out of the eight studies it was included in. These researchers also reported, in a summary of empirical evidence regarding both organizational performance and success in relationship to OCBs, that civic virtue was significantly related to quality of performance regarding sales samples and the reduction of customer complaints in a restaurant sample (Podsakoff et al., 2000).

== Measures ==
Measures of OCBs typically consist of a rating scale of items that have been empirically validated as being OCBs. Ratings can be performed at the supervisor, peer, or self levels. In 1990, Podsakoff, MacKenzie, Moorman, and Fetter conducted an important study using the five dimensions of OCB: altruism, conscientiousness, sportsmanship, courtesy, and civic virtue. This prevalent study was one of the first where civic virtue was analyzed independently of other OCBs and where the construct was given its own scale items. Civic virtue was specifically defined as “behavior on the part of an individual that indicates that he/she responsibly participates in, is involved in, or is concerned about the life of the company” (Podsakoff et al., 1990, p. 115). These researchers developed a 24-item scale by having 10 of their colleagues sort generated scale items into one of the five OCB dimensions or an “other” category if they felt the item did not fit any of the five defined conceptual definitions. The final version of the scale included only items for which at least 80% of the judges agreed on the items categorization. The four civic virtue items outlined in Podsakoff and colleagues’ (1990) scale include:

- Attends meeting that are not mandatory, but are considered important.
- Attends functions that are not required, but help the company image.
- Keeps abreast of changes in the organization.
- Reads and keeps up with organization announcements, memos, and so on.

This five-factor OCB structure has served as the building block for a substantial amount of OCB research and has been validated repeatedly.
