= Advanced Management Program =

Intensive non-degree senior executive education program

An Advanced Management Program (AMP) is an intensive non-degree senior executive education program often offered by elite business schools and aimed at senior managers and government officials. It is offered by business schools in several parts of the world, including North America, Europe, India, and Australia. Participants usually have at least 15 years of management experience and are within one or two levels of the C-suite.

Such programs exclude the core curriculum of MBA and Executive MBA programs because, according to the Wall Street Journal, "these students are well beyond that fare." Instead, Advanced Management Programs focus on teaching "how to lead ... and the fine art of executing a vision." The Columbia Business School AMP, for example, is built on three pillars: Leading authentically, thinking strategically, and executing dynamically.

Advanced Management Programs are usually highly selective. Business schools only offer them at most twice per year and generally limit class sizes to no more than 50 students. Admission to Advanced Management Programs, rather than being based on academics or standardized test scores, is based instead on testing, management seniority, and workplace accomplishments.

In 2008, Advanced Management Programs generally cost within the range of US$50,000-$98,000 at top business schools, and 95% of students were sponsored by their employers. As of 2020, example AMP tuition prices were US$56,000 at Chicago Booth, CHF 30,000 at IMD, €38,500 at INSEAD, US$78,450 at Columbia, US$79,500 at Wharton, US$65,000 at MIT, and US$82,000 at Harvard.

Some business schools offer alumni status to students who complete the school's AMP, while other business schools do not.

Advanced Management Programs should not be confused with non-degree programs from training institutes such as Mini-MBA or Business Certificates from non-degree giving organizations.

== History ==
The first Advanced Management Program began at Harvard Business School in 1945, which is considered a degree program at the conclusion of World War II. The forerunner to Harvard's AMP was a series of seminars for New England businessmen taught by Harvard Business School professor Philip Cabot prior to the war. Professor Cabot's seminars became more formalized during the war and turned into the Advanced Management Program at war's end. Harvard's AMP was a role model for similar programs elsewhere. By 1951, five more universities offered similar programs. By 1958, 39 additional similar programs had been created at other business schools.
