= Contextual performance =

Important aspect of overall job performance

Contextual performance is defined as the activities that employees carry out to contribute to the social and psychological functionality of an organisation. It is a component of an individual's job performance. There is a perspective proficiency in a specific task is not sufficient and employees may be selected based on their competencies that may contribute to the wider functionality of an organisation.

Contextual performance may consist of activities such as volunteering for additional work, strict adherence to organizational rules and procedures, and various other discretionary behaviours.

== Overview ==
This construct was first identified in the industrial and organizational psychology research world by Borman & Motowidlo. With the rise of the knowledge economy, expectations for employees may increase. While the principles of contextual performance are very similar to those of organizational citizenship behavior (OCBs) and prosocial behavior, it is contested that contextual performance is in fact a construct in its own right.

The counterpart of contextual performance is task performance. Task performance is defined as the work activities that contribute to an organization's technical capacity. Contextual performance is more likely to be voluntary, whereas task performance is more likely to be prescribed by the job description. Although contextual performance is subjective, research suggests that managers increasingly include these behaviours when conducting performance evaluations. While conceptually different, these two types of performance have moderately high correlations, whereby individuals who are good task performers are often also good contextual performers.

== Taxonomy ==
Research has yielded several taxonomies of contextual performance and organizational citizenship behaviour. Borman & Motowildo describe the contextual performance as encompassing both OCB's and prosocial work behaviours. The following is Borman & Motowildo's taxonomy:

- Persisting with enthusiasm and extra effort as necessary to complete own task activities successfully
- Volunteering to carry out task activities that are not formally part of one's own job
- Helping and cooperating with others
- Following organizational rules and procedures
- Endorsing, supporting, and defending organizational objectives
- Interpersonal facilitation
- Job dedication

To garner information regarding an employee's contextual performance, researchers adapt items from the previous taxonomy. Items are measured by supervisors on a Likert scale, from one to five. A few sample items are:

- The employee voluntarily does more than the job requires to help others or contribute to organizational effectiveness
- The employee tackles a difficult work assignment enthusiastically
- The employee volunteers for additional duty

== Predictors ==
=== Dispositional predictors ===
Researchers believe that there are different traits and abilities that predict task and contextual performance. Intelligence has been found to be a significant predictor of task performance and procedural knowledge, or knowledge of how to do a task, which predicts contextual performance. Otherwise, there is limited support for the relationship between intelligence and contextual performance. Because of this, research has also explored non-cognitive predictors of performance, such as personality. Research findings show that the personality trait of conscientiousness does indeed have a weak to moderate positive relationship with contextual performance. Openness to experience and extraversion were found to have a weak correlation.

In a team setting, the personality traits of conscientiousness, extraversion, and agreeableness predict contextual performance. Other personality traits, besides the Big Five, have also been researched. It was found that the relationship between dependability, work orientation, cooperativeness and contextual performance is greater than their relationship with task performance.

=== Situational and job-related predictors ===
If an individual perceives that he or she is being treated fairly, if they are satisfied with their job, and if they feel that their supervisor or leader provides support, their contextual performance is expected to increase. Procedural justice describes the fairness used in the allocation process and found a weak-to-moderate positive correlation between the two dimensions of contextual performance: interpersonal facilitation and job dedication. Both individual differences and situational constraints influence contextual performance.

== Outcomes ==
Research shows that contextual performance is a significant predictor of turnover over and above task performance. The facet of interpersonal facilitation significantly predicts organizational commitment. Research supports that contextual performance relate to overall organization performance as measured by quality, quantity, financial measures, and customer service measures.

== Theoretical implications ==
Many conceptualizations of employee performance focus only on task performance, and may thus be deficient because they lack the contextual performance construct. Since evidence indicates that supervisor ratings include contextual performance, a holistic conceptualization of performance should include both task and contextual performance. Another theoretical implication is the overlapping nature of contextual performance with both OCB and prosocial behaviour. Some researchers argue that OCB clearly overlaps with contextual performance and should be redefined as the same construct. Contextual performance is considered be an extra-role behaviours that is not expected or rewarded by the organization. However, this conceptualization may not be accurate.

== Related areas ==
- Organizational citizenship behaviour
