= Implicit leadership theory =

Implicit leadership theory (ILT) is a cognitive theory of leadership developed by Robert Lord and colleagues. It is based on the idea that individuals create cognitive representations of the world, and use these preconceived notions to interpret their surroundings and control their behaviors. ILT suggests that group members have implicit expectations and assumptions about the personal characteristics, traits, and qualities that are inherent in a leader. These assumptions, termed implicit leadership theories or leader prototypes, guide an individual's perceptions and responses to leaders. The term implicit is used because they are not outwardly stated and the term theory is used because it involves the generalization of past experiences to new experiences. ILTs allow individuals to identify leaders and aid them in responding appropriately to leaders in order to avoid conflict.

== Individual differences ==
Although ILTs vary between individuals, many overlap in terms of the task skills and relationship skills that leaders should possess in order to be successful. In terms of task skills, most people seek a leader that is in control, determined, influential, and continuously involved in the group activities. When considering relationship skills, most people tend to prefer a leader who is caring, honest, open to new ideas, and interested in the group work. In a study by Offermann, Kennedy, and Wirtz (1994), the content and factor structure variation of male and female ILTs were compared across three stimuli, being leaders, effective leaders, and supervisors. They found that eight factors of the ILTs were rather stable across all participants, between males and females, and across the three stimuli. These eight factors were charisma, sensitivity, dedication, intelligence, attractiveness, masculinity, tyranny, and strength. The results from this study suggest that, although ILTs differ depending on the individual, this variation may be systematic and, at times, predictable.

== Cultural Differences ==
Although charisma is valued across cultures, culture plays a major role in the specific content of leadership prototypes. For example, a study that began in 1991 measured leadership prototypes across 60 countries found that more individualistic cultures tend to favor ambitious leaders, whereas collectivistic cultures often prefer leaders who are self-effacing. Cross-cultural differences may be difficult to study when using nations as a guideline for grouping, as many countries have a variety of cultures within them.

== Biases ==
The social world is solely understood in terms of perceptions, thus people use these perceptions intuitively to effectively organize and guide social interactions. We observe the actions of other people, take note of their personal characteristics, compare them to our own ILTs, and make decisions regarding whether they make an appropriate or inappropriate leader. Additionally, we use ILTs to evaluate the suitability and effectiveness of a group's leader. For example, if you believe that a good leader exerts control over the group, you may focus on this specific characteristic. Consequently, bias can result from noting only the instances when the leader was or was not in control. In a study by Foti and Lord (1987), participants were shown a videotape of a leader-group interaction. The participants were told to report the behaviors that the leader had or had not performed. The results of this study indicated that people are quicker to respond, more accurate, and more confident when they are judging behaviors that are both part of their ILTs and performed by the leader, in comparison to behaviors that were part of their ILTs and were not performed by the leader. Since ILTs are implicit theories, meaning the individual is likely unaware of their biases, it is difficult for ineffective ILTs to be recognized and discarded. For example, Offermann et al. (1994) found that masculinity was a stable ILT across participants, sex, and stimuli. However, males tend to be more autocratic and task-oriented in leadership style, while females tend to adopt a more participative and relationship-oriented style. Consequently, females generally tend to make better leaders as they have a more collaborative approach. This bias would be difficult to correct, as people are typically not aware of their implicit assumptions.

== Impact ==
When leadership prototypes are compared to the actual leaders, leader-member relations may be affected. In other words, when a potential leader does not match followers' expectations, that leader may be met with resistance, regardless of actual leadership competence. A study which asked 439 employees to compare their ILTs to their actual manager at work found that an individual whose ILT matches their actual leader is also likely to feel greater satisfaction with their position and experience higher commitment toward their group. The match between an individual's ILT and actual leader also has in indirect positive impact on the individual's well-being.

== See also ==
- Implicit cognition
- Leader-member Exchange Theory

== Bibliography ==
- Den Hartog, Deanne N.; House, Robert J.; Hanges, Paul J.; Ruiz-Quintanilla, S.Antonio; Dorfman, Peter W.; Abdalla, Ikhlas A.; Adetoun, Babajide Samuel; Aditya, Ram N.; Agourram, Hafid; Akande, Adebowale; Akande, Bolanle Elizabeth; Akerblom, Staffan; Altschul, Carlos; Alvarez-Backus, Eden; Andrews, Julian; Arias, Maria Eugenia; Arif, Mirian Sofyan; Ashkanasy, Neal M.; Asllani, Arben; Audia, Giuseppe; Bakacsi, Gyula; Bendova, Helena; Beveridge, David; Bhagat, Rabi S.; Blacutt, Alejandro; Bao, Jiming; Bodega, Domenico; Bodur, Muzaffer; Booth, Simon; et al. (1999). "Culture specific and cross-culturally generalizable implicit leadership theories". The Leadership Quarterly. 10 (2): 219–256. doi:10.1016/S1048-9843(99)00018-1.
- Epitropaki, Olga; Martin, Robin (2005). "From Ideal to Real: A Longitudinal Study of the Role of Implicit Leadership Theories on Leader-Member Exchanges and Employee Outcomes". Journal of Applied Psychology. 90 (4): 659–676. doi:10.1037/0021-9010.90.4.659. PMID 16060785.
- Foti, Roseanne J.; Lord, Robert G. (1987). "Prototypes and scripts: The effects of alternative methods of processing information on rating accuracy". Organizational Behavior and Human Decision Processes. 39 (3): 318–340. doi:10.1016/0749-5978(87)90027-6.
- Offermann, Lynn R.; Kennedy, John K.; Wirtz, Philip W. (1994). "Implicit leadership theories: Content, structure, and generalizability". The Leadership Quarterly. 5: 43–58. doi:10.1016/1048-9843(94)90005-1.
- Phillips, James S.; Lord, Robert G. (1986). "Notes on the Practical and Theoretical Consequences of Implicit Leadership Theories for the Future of Leadership Measurement". Journal of Management. 12: 31–41. doi:10.1177/014920638601200104.
