= High-commitment management =

High-commitment management is a management approach that focuses on fostering employee empowerment, personal responsibility, and decentralized decision-making at all levels of an organization. Unlike traditional hierarchical management styles, this approach distributes authority to encourage greater engagement and initiative among employees.

Although this management style can be complex to implement, research suggests that it may contribute to long-term organizational performance. Studies have also indicated that organizations using high-commitment practices report sustained levels of performance and employee engagement.

A key component of high-commitment management is its emphasis on employee relationships. This approach often includes flexible work schedules and comprehensive hiring processes, which may involve multiple interviews, structured induction programs, and team-building activities. Once integrated into the organization, employees are encouraged to build trust and collaboration, which are considered essential for sustaining commitment in the workplace.

== History ==
The founders or transformational chief executives design high-commitment management firms to achieve sustained high levels of commitment from employees. The application of high-commitment management in firms today originated from an alignment of the employees and the firm's missions.

Certain sociologists attribute this congruence as a product of performance and psychological collaboration between the firm and its employees. Since its initial development, high-commitment management has been driven by self-regulated behavior and performance-driven group dynamics. Contrary to top-down leadership practices, high-commitment management took form as leaders engaged and listened to people, allowing ideas from different levels of the organization to push the firm forward.

=== Self-directed work teams ===
In a study of workplace illumination at the Hawthorne Works of the Western Electric Company, Elton Mayo, a sociologist from Harvard Business School, concluded that when the organization established experimental work groups, "the individuals became a team, and the team gave itself wholeheartedly and spontaneously to cooperation." Through a natural system of collaboration, the teams became responsible for their work and managing their group. Mayo's research uncovered that teams, under their direction, developed a capacity for self-motivated learning and change. This concept of designing the work system with full employee participation was a breakthrough for organizations during the 1990s. During this time, employees closest to the product and customer began to acquire greater decision-making power and capabilities.

=== Interview programs ===
The Hawthorne Experiments sought to determine a correlation between light levels and productivity. Researchers divided employees into teams of six and interviewed individuals to assess the effect of lighting. Mayo discovered that the interview program established by the study naturally instilled a sense of higher purpose in the employees. Exposure of employee thoughts and concerns to managers was a fundamental aspect of the relationship between managers and employees. Evidently, by having the ability to speak with their managers, employees at Western Electric exhibited a dramatic improvement in their attitudes toward work. Essential to a highly committed workforce, the interview program was formally developed, and cooperation with management was sustained.

=== Problem-solving teams ===
The Hawthorne experiment further highlighted that teams working without coercion from higher-ups or limitations from below could exceed even their expectations. Sociologist Fritz Roethlisberger argued that this informal organization left the team responsible for addressing the myriad problems that continuously arise. Roethlisberger observed that studying the dynamics of informal groups, human interactions, and collaboration has the potential to determine how teams face problems on their own. Together, the individuals in the team strive to improve processes by adapting to different demands and learning from each other.

=== Cross-training ===
In the 1970s, modern Japanese management in the automobile industry began to place significant emphasis on cross-training. Sociologists studied how Japanese automobile firms implemented company-wide orientation and training programs to cross-train their employees.

As Japanese firms trained employees in various aspects of the production process, sociologists discovered that the training fostered a sense of unity among employees, with all becoming dedicated to the company's mission. These established connections appeared to promote cooperation among the workforce. The Japanese auto plants demonstrated that flexibility within production teams allowed employees to focus on their tasks while maintaining the productivity of others. Cross-training is still used today to improve employee skills, increase flexibility, and foster teamwork.

== Difference from other management strategies ==
High-commitment practices are spin-offs of the natural system of management, like other management strategies within this system. High-commitment practices assume natural theories of motivation, rather than the considerably different rational theories of motivation.

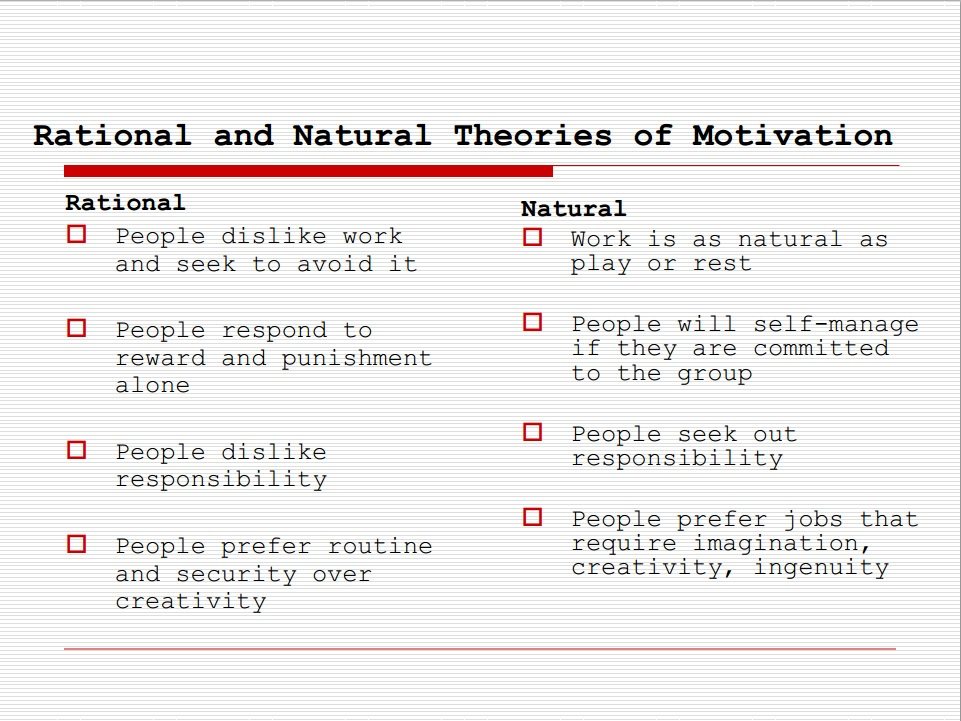
Differences between rational and natural management systems

Because most management strategies before high-commitment practices assumed rational theories of motivation, high-commitment practices differ from these strategies in three primary aspects.

=== Employee motivation ===
In terms of methods for motivating workers, there are key differences between high-commitment practices and the standard rational system. The rational system of management focuses on either punishments or incentives. For example, the earliest form of rational management, direct control, encourages employee productivity by having supervisors oversee the production process and punishing workers who fail to produce enough output. Another form of rational management, bureaucratic control, encourages productivity through career incentives such as bonuses and promotions. However, high-commitment practices, unlike any form of rational management, aim to stimulate productivity by fostering employee commitment to the organization. For example, Data General, a corporation that advocates high-commitment practices, has managed to make employees love their tasks and become so attached to the corporation that many choose to work twelve hours, four hours more than the company prescribes. Contrary to rational management, high-commitment practices aim to create environments where employees aspire to deliver their best efforts.

=== Employee control ===
High-commitment practices also differ from practices in the rational management system in terms of employee control. The rational system of management discourages job autonomy, believing that such freedom will lower productivity because employees may choose not to work. For example, in scientific management and Fordism, employees are given specific instructions on how to perform certain tasks. While the rational system of management seeks to provide very specific direction to employees, high-commitment practices strongly encourage independence.

=== Influence on corporate structure ===
Institutions employing rational management and those employing high-commitment practices also differ in their corporate structure. Institutions with rational management tend to have a steep hierarchy, with many ranks separating floor workers from executives. For example, institutions employing bureaucratic control often have one entry-level position at the bottom of the hierarchy, from which recruits work their way up the corporate ladder. Because these institutions have a steep hierarchy, those near the bottom of the chain are often alienated from higher-ups. Consequently, relationships between executives and workers are minimal. In contrast, institutions that employ high-commitment practices typically have a flatter hierarchy, and intra-firm networking is easier. As a result, most employees readily develop attachments to their on-the-job peers, bosses, and the institution, which increases their commitment.

=== Other natural managements ===
While high-commitment practices are similar to other strategies in the Human Relations School, both aim to increase job satisfaction and make employees feel valued. High-commitment practices seek to foster attachment to the institution, whereas the Human Relations School aims to encourage employees to work based on the satisfaction gained from contributing outputs.

== Google ==
Google follows a high-commitment management model and has a distinctive corporate culture. Founded in 1998 by Larry Page and Sergey Brin, the company was established to create a positive and engaging work environment. Google's stated philosophies include principles such as "work should be challenging and the challenge should be fun" and "you can be serious without a suit."

In terms of organization, Google aims to provide "a casual and democratic atmosphere, resulting in its distinction as a 'Flat' company." In its earlier years, Google had a fairly informal product-development system. Ideas moved upwards from "Googlers" without any formal review process from senior managers, and teams working on innovative projects were kept small. However, with the continuing expansion of the company, Google now holds weekly, all-hands ('TGIF') meetings at which employees ask questions directly to executives about company issues. This is consistent with the idea that high-commitment work systems "typically involve practices that enhance communication across organizational levels." In addition, employees are encouraged to propose ambitious ideas, and supervisors are assigned small teams to test if these ideas will work. Teams are made up of members with equal authority—"there is no top-down hierarchy"—and nearly everyone at Google carries a generic job title, such as "product manager."

Google hires those who are "smart and determined," while favoring "ability over experience." In an interview on the company's corporate culture and hiring, Eric Schmidt, Google's executive chairman, expressed the idea of evaluating potential hires' passions and commitments in addition to their technical qualifications. He said that "people are going to do what they're going to do, and you (company, leader) just assist them." Google does not believe that its job is to manage the company; instead, it believes that its greatest task is to hire the right people, and in turn, "will see a building of 'self-initiative' behavior"—a characteristic of people working in high-commitment workplaces. As a result, engineers at Google are allotted 20 percent of their time to work on their ideas, some of which yield public offerings, such as Google News and Orkut, a social networking website.

== Implementation difficulties and disadvantages ==
While there is evidence that high-commitment management practices provide benefits to the efficiency of the workplace, there are some disadvantages and difficulties associated with the system.

Much of the research presenting strong evidence of success with high-commitment management practices may be due to confounding variables. An example of this can be seen in research by Burton and O'Reilly, who suggested that the benefits seen from high-commitment practices may not be due to the practices themselves, but may result from an overarching system architecture or organizational logic. They also suggested that good managers pick this form of managing practice, and, therefore, good managers may be a confounding variable. Thus, the relative success of these practices may be, in fact, a result of reasons other than the practices themselves.

The process of transitioning a workplace to use high-commitment management practices can be difficult, and to gain the full benefits of such practices, full implementation is required. All companies must go through a transitioning stage from their earlier management style to high-commitment practices; however, not all of the changes can be made at once. This transition can often be difficult for managers to find the right balance between enough and too much worker influence, and change the management philosophy along with the practices. Full implementation of high-commitment management practices is required to receive the full benefits of the system. Therefore, during the transition period, firms may not experience positive changes right away, which may provide disincentives for continuing the transition. This may explain why many firms in the US lack comprehensive commitment practices.

High-commitment management practices are currently considered a universal approach, considered to be effective across all firms. However, the best form of management for a firm in a price-sensitive, high-volume commercial market differs from that for a firm in a high-quality, low-volume market. This distinction has been observed in both the private and public sectors, where only some high-commitment management practices in the private sector provide the same benefits in the public sector, and the entire program cannot be easily transferred. Managers may also face difficulties when implementing high-commitment management practices, as they must balance a consistent approach—using the same practices throughout the entire workforce—against adjusting practices to meet the specific needs of different groups. As the workforce becomes more diverse, this tension may become more pronounced.

While some workers feel positive towards high-commitment management practices, it is also admitted that these practices portray workers as a resource or commodity, to be utilized by the organization. Therefore, even though positive effects have been shown, these practices are also seen as another management initiative, aimed at gaining greater control and efficiency from employees. Therefore, these practices are still exploiting the worker. Workers do express excessive pressure and high insecurity when high-commitment management practices are implemented. However, even though companies may have high-commitment practices, which in themselves mean companies will have little employee flexibility if the nature of the company is such that they embrace change, then these can coexist.

== See also ==
- Flat management
- Hierarchical organization
- Holacracy
- Sociocracy (dynamic governance)
- Workers' self-management
