= Ethical leadership =

Leadership concept

Ethical leadership is leadership that is directed by respect for ethical beliefs and values and for the dignity and rights of others. It is thus related to concepts such as trust, honesty, consideration, charisma, and fairness.

Ethics is concerned with the kinds of values and morals an individual or a society finds desirable or appropriate. Furthermore, ethics is concerned with the virtuousness of individuals and their motives. A leader's choices are also influenced by their moral development.

== Theory ==
=== Social learning theory ===
According to social learning theory ethical leaders acts as role models for their followers. Behavior, such as following ethical practices and taking ethical decisions, are observed, and consequently followed. Rewards and punishments given out by the leader create a second social learning opportunity, that teaches which behavior is acceptably and which is not.

=== Social exchange theory ===
In social exchange theory the effect of ethical leadership on followers is explained by transactional exchanges between the leader and their followers. The leader's fairness and caring for followers activates a reciprocatory process, in which the followers act in the same manner towards the leader.

== Operationalization ==
A commonly used measure of ethical leadership is the Ethical Leadership Scale (ELS), developed by Brown et al. in 2005. It consists of 10 items with an internal consistency of alpha = .92 and shows a satisfying fit, with indices at or above recommended standards. Other scales include the Ethical Leadership at Work Questionnaire proposed by Kalshoven et al. with 38 Items and the Ethical Leadership Questionnaire (ELQ), composed of 15 Items and proposed by Yukl et al. in 2013.

== Comparison to other leadership styles ==
Though conceptionally close to and partly overlapping with other leadership styles such as transformational leadership, spiritual leadership and authentic leadership, ethical leadership nonetheless describes a unique leadership style with noticeable differences. The most apparent differentiating feature is ethical leadership's focus on the setting of moral standards and moral management, which sets it apart from transformation leadership's focus on vision and values and spiritual leadership's focus on hope and faith. Additionally, the nature of ethical leadership lies in the awareness of others, and not of the self, differentiating it clearly from authentic leadership.
