= Leader–member exchange theory =

Leadership approach based on relationships

The leader–member exchange (LMX) theory is a relationship-based approach to leadership that focuses on the two-way (dyadic) relationship between leaders and followers.

The latest version (2016) of leader–member exchange theory of leadership development explains the growth of vertical dyadic workplace influence and team performance in terms of selection and self-selection of informal apprenticeships in leadership. It suggests that leaders select the best and make offers and members of the team accept or not. Apprentices who complete the program develop strong emotional attachments with their mentor-teacher. This is reflected in their descriptions by both of their relationship as one of mutual respect for competence, trust in character and benevolence toward each other. Those who complete the apprenticeship training are more collaborative, helpful to all team members, more deeply engaged in team activities and contribute more to team health and prosperity. This is seen as a win-win relationship by both parties, their team, network and overall organization.

== Theory ==
The goal of LMX theory is to explain the effects of leadership on members, teams, and organizations. According to the theory, leaders form strong trust, emotional, and respect-based relationships with some members of a team, but not with others. Interpersonal relationships can be increased. LMX theory claims that leaders do not treat each subordinate the same. The work-related attitudes and behaviors of those subordinates depend on how they are treated by their leader.

=== Background ===
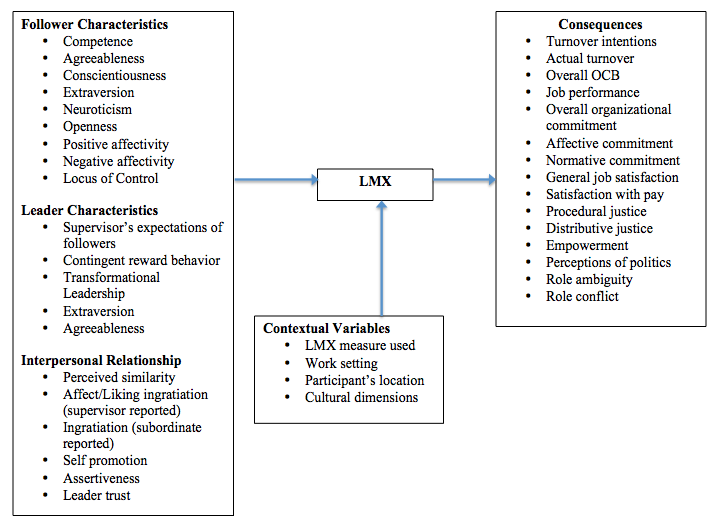
Based on Dulebohn et al., 2012.

Dulebohn et al. identify three primary groups of antecedents: leader characteristics, follower characteristics, and interpersonal relationships. Followers are evaluated by their competence, agreeableness, conscientiousness, extraversion, neuroticism, and openness, positive affectivity, negative affectivity, and locus of control. Leaders are evaluated based on supervisor's expectation of followers, contingent reward behavior, transformational leadership, extraversion, and agreeableness. Although the leader takes a dominant role in creating an LMX relationship, the follower also plays an important part in creating the relationship. Interpersonal relationship variables that may affect this relationship are perceived similarity, affect/liking, integration, self-promotion, assertiveness, and leader trust. This variety of characteristics creates the basis for LMX and allows it to be successful or unsuccessful, depending on the present traits.

Of the follower characteristics, competence, agreeableness, conscientiousness, extraversion, locus of control, and positive affectivity are all positively correlated with LMX. Negative affectivity and neuroticism are negatively correlated with LMX. All of the listed leader characteristics are positively correlated with LMX. With the exception of assertiveness, all of the interpersonal relationship variable correlated positively with LMX. In an experiment run by Dulebohn et al. that measured the effects of various characteristics on LMX and its outcomes, leader behaviors and perceptions explained most of the variance. This study suggests that it is up to the leader to form the relationships necessary for successful implementation of LMX.

=== Consequences ===
Whether LMX is successful can be measured by a multitude of consequences. Some of the consequences that can be measured include: turnover intentions, actual turnover, overall organizational citizenship behavior, affective commitment, normative commitment, general job satisfaction, satisfaction with supervisor, satisfaction with pay, procedural justice, distributive justice, empowerment, perceptions of politics, role ambiguity, and role conflict. LMX typically decreases turnover intentions and actual turnover, as well as role ambiguity and role conflict. LMX increases the other measures, particularly increasing perceptual and attitudinal outcomes.

In their 1997 meta-analysis of LMX correlates and constructs, Gerstner & Day explain that research has generally found relationships between LMX and positive work performance and attitude measures, especially for members (as opposed to leaders). That is, especially for members, LMX is associated with higher performance ratings, better objective performance, higher overall satisfaction, more satisfaction with supervisor, stronger organizational commitment, and more positive role perceptions. Gerstner & Day's meta-analysis used 79 studies to examine the correlates of LMX. Their analysis found a positive correlation between the member's perceptions of LMX and the leader's ratings of the member's job performance. It also found an even stronger positive correlation between the leader's perceptions of LMX and the leader's ratings of the member's job performance. Fortunately for some subordinates, Gerstner & Day explain that supervisors may have a tendency to rate a subordinate more favorably due to a positive LMX relationship. They further explain that LMX perceptions may cause a leader to form positive or negative expectations about an employee which can then affect actual employee performance rather than only performance ratings. This meta-analysis also found statistically significant positive correlations between LMX and objective performance (as opposed to subjective performance ratings), satisfaction with supervisor, overall satisfaction, organizational commitment, and role clarity. It found statistically significant negative correlations between LMX and role conflict and turnover intentions.

=== Culture ===
Rockstuhl et al.'s 2012 meta-analysis of LMX theory and national culture correlates found that in Western cultures LMX is more strongly correlated with organizational citizenship behavior (OCB), justice perceptions, job satisfaction, turnover intentions, and leader trust than in Asian cultures. This meta-analysis used 253 studies conducted in 23 countries to compare the differences in how LMX influenced work-related attitudes and behaviors such as task performance, OCB, distributive justice, procedural justice, interactional justice, job satisfaction, affective commitment, normative commitment, and turnover intentions between two different cultural configurations: horizontal-individualistic (Western countries) and vertical-collectivist (Asian countries). The analysis found that the relationships between LMX and citizenship behaviors, between LMX and justice outcomes, between LMX and job satisfaction, between LMX and turnover intentions, and between LMX and leader trust are stronger in horizontal-individualistic cultures than in vertical-collectivist cultures. The analysis also found that there is not a cultural difference in the relationships between LMX and task performance and between LMX and affective and normative organizational commitment.

=== Citizenship behaviors ===
Ilies et al.'s 2007 meta-analysis of LMX theory and citizenship behaviors found a positive relationship between LMX and citizenship behaviors. The meta-analysis also found that the target of the citizenship behaviors has a moderating effect on the magnitude of the relationship between LMX and citizenship behaviors. That is, citizenship behaviors targeted at individuals are more strongly correlated with LMX than are citizenship behaviors targeted at an organization.

== Evolution ==
Much of what has become leader–member exchange theory has origins in the introduction of the vertical dyad linkage theory (VDL) in 1975. Vertical dyad linkage theory has become widely known as leader–member exchange theory, although researchers such as George B. Graen and Mary Uhl-Bien maintain that current LMX theory differs markedly from early VDL work. Previous leadership theories had assumed that all subordinates have similar characteristics and that all supervisors behaved in the same fashion with all their subordinates. Gerstner and Day explain that traditional leadership theories attributed leadership effectiveness to personal characteristics of the leader, to features of the situation, or to an interaction between the two. LMX seeks to provide a different perspective that treats each subordinate/supervisor pair as an individual dyad with its own relationships. According to LMX, the quality of this dyadic relationship predicts attitudinal and behavioral outcomes (such as those discussed above) at the individual, group, and organizational level. In 1976 Graen published "Role-making processes in complex organizations" in the Handbook of Industrial and Organizational Psychology, further increasing awareness about LMX. Before this article was published, few researchers explored LMX, but after its publication, LMX became a widely researched and cited theory.

By the 1980s, researchers in this field began transitioning from VDL to LMX, with the primary difference being a new focus specifically on jobs and task domains. By the 1990s LMX had started to become a substantial theory, integrating the previous theories of organizational citizenship behavior (OCB) and perceived organizational support (POS). It became increasingly clear that LMX correlated with job satisfaction and organizational commitment. In 1995 Graen and Uhl-Bien used four stages to explain how LMX theory had evolved over time. (A more detailed discussion of these stages follows below.) During the first stage the theory primarily involved work socialization and vertical dyad linkage, with the focus was on the analysis of differentiated dyads, that is, in-groups and out-groups. In the second stage LMX studies focussed on the quality of the leader-member relationship and on its outcomes. The third stage involved the creation of a descriptive approach to building dyadic relationships. In the fourth stage, LMX moved beyond the dyad level and researchers assessed it at the systems-level, that is, at group and network levels.

From 2000 to the present, leader–member exchange theory has been researched extensively, adding more correlates and processes, as described in the Background and Consequences sections above. LMX is evolving into a theory that crosses dyad-group levels.

=== The four stages ===
In their 1995 paper titled "Relationship-Based Approach to Leadership: Development of Leader-Member Exchange (LMX) Theory of Leadership over 25 Years: Applying a Multi-Level Multi-Domain Perspective," George B. Graen and Mary Uhl-Bien discuss the development of LMX from through four evolutionary stages.

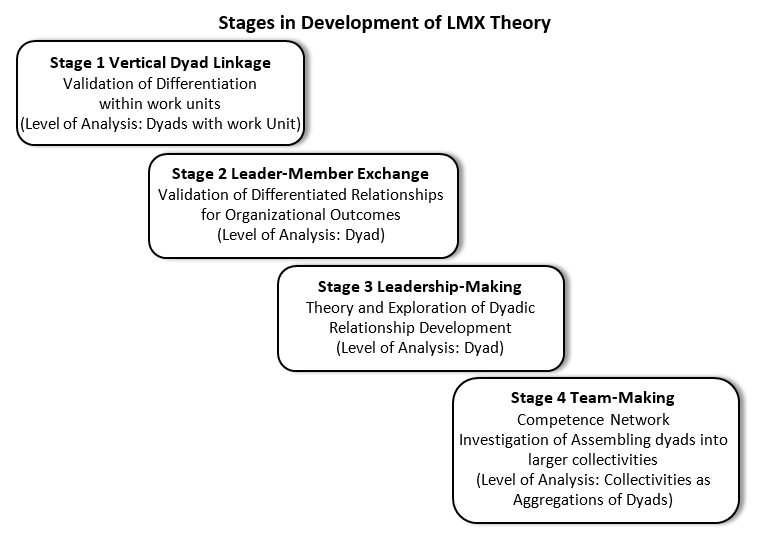
Based on Graen and Uhl-Bien, 1995.

==== Stage 1: Vertical dyad linkage ====
Graen and Uhl-Bien explain that research into issues relating to leader–member exchange began with studies on work socialization and vertical dyad linkage which found that many managerial processes in organizations occurred on a dyadic basis, with managers forming differentiated relationships with those who reported to them. Longitudinal studies of management teams were conducted in which managers and those who reported to them were asked to describe their work and working relationships in terms of inputs, process, and outcomes. When asked to describe their manager's behavior, different employees gave very different descriptions of the same person. Some employees described what are called "high-quality exchanges" (also known as "in-group"), which are "characterized by a high degree of mutual trust, respect, and obligation." Others described "low-quality exchanges" (also known as "out-group"), which are "characterized by low trust, respect, and obligation." According to Graen and Uhl-Bien, early VDL research concluded that these differentiated relationships resulted from a manager's limited time and social resources, allowing him/her to form only a few higher-quality exchange relationships.

==== Stage 2: Leader–member exchange ====
In the second stage, terminology shifted from vertical dyad linkage to leader–member exchange. Graen and Uhl-Bien explain that VDL research was followed by a series of studies which moved the theory "beyond a description of the differentiated relationships in a work unit to an explanation of how these relationships develop and what the consequences of the relationships are for organizational functioning". A number of studies analyzed the specific characteristics of LMX relationships, and other studies analyzed the relationship between LMX and organizational outcomes/consequences. Graen and Uhl-Bien describe the central concepts of LMX research at this time as: "(1) development of LMX relationships is influenced by characteristics and behaviors of leaders and members and occurs through a role-making process, and (2) higher-quality LMX relationships have very positive outcomes for leaders, followers, work units, and the organization in general."

==== Stage 3: Leadership-making ====
Graen and Uhl-Bien recount that the research in the third stage moved beyond "in-groups" and "out-groups" and focused more on producing effective leadership process through the development of effective leadership relationships. According to Graen and Uhl-Bien, the key difference in this stage is that it says that managers should make high-quality LMX relationships available to all employees, rather than having differentiated relationships among employees as described in the VDL approach. This stage uses the Leadership Making model to provide a more descriptive and practically useful model of leadership development. The idea of Leadership Making began with two longitudinal field experiments that analyzed what would happen if leaders were trained to give all of their subordinates the opportunity to develop a high-quality relationship. Results showed that the performance of subordinates who took advantage of the opportunity to develop a high-quality LMX improved dramatically. Overall, the performance of the work unit improved by increasing the number of high-quality LMX relationships. The Leadership Making model was developed based on these studies to emphasize the importance of forming high-quality relationships within organizations and to outline a process for how these relationships might be formed and maintained in practice. The model describes a process in which leader–member relationships go from a "stranger" phase (characterized by formal, contractual interactions) to an "acquaintance" stage (characterized by increased social exchanges and the sharing of information and resources on a personal and work level) to a level of "mature partnership" exchanges (characterized by "in kind" exchanges that are behavioral and emotional, by loyalty, by support, by mutual respect, by trust, and by a high degree of incremental influence).

==== Stage 4: Team-Making ====
At the fourth stage Graen and Uhl-Bien propose using a systems-level perspective to investigate how differentiated dyadic relationships combine to form larger, network systems. These networks are what make up an organization's "leadership structure", or the "pattern of leadership relationships among individuals throughout the organization". Graen and Uhl-Bien explain that the leadership structure emerges from the network of relationships and mutual dependencies that develop as organization members fulfill roles and complete tasks. Investigation at this stage analyzes task interdependencies and the quality of the relationships that develop due to these interdependencies. Specifically, research seeks to identify where more effective leadership relationships have a large impact on task performance as well as how differentiated relationships affect each other and the entire leadership structure.

== Limitations ==
A major problem with the leader–member exchange approach to leadership is that it is not theory; it uses circular arguments and is akin to a tautology or it forces innovation. For instance, good leadership is about having good relations. What causes these good relations? This question is unclear and the problem is that most of the research uses LMX as an independent or moderator variable, which violates the exogeneity assumption made in causal models and hence creates an intractable endogeneity problem. Also, research on the topic is not particularly helpful in describing the specific leader behaviors that promote high quality relationships; in fact, these behaviors are exogenous to LMX, which is an outcome variable (i.e., trusting, liking, etc.). Thus, exogenous manipulation of the construct is not possible and only manipulation of its antecedents is possible. This is due largely to the fact that LMX is a descriptive (rather than normative) theory which focuses on explaining how people relate to and interact with each other rather than on a prescription for how to form high quality LMX relationships. LMX research has limited discussion of leader behaviors that can promote relationship building, for the most part offering only generalities about the need for leaders to show trust, respect, openness, autonomy and discretion. As a recent review suggests, it is time for this branch of leadership research to go back to square one.

== Future developments ==
While much work has been done on leader–member exchange (LMX) in the past forty years, LMX is still being actively researched. One of the main questions regards how LMX relationships form and how managers can most effectively create them. Thus far, most large-scale studies have relied on existing dyads and investigated the consequences of those existing relationships. There exist many theories about how the initial dyadic relationship forms, and how to form strong leader–member relationships, yet there is little consensus among scientists. Additionally, there is much to be learned about the context surrounding LMX, such as organizational culture. Although some research has been done examining national culture and LMX, it is still being heavily investigated. Another area for future research, which is suggested by Graen & Uhl-Bien, is investigating LMX relationships on a network scale. This involves looking at multiple LMX relationships across an organization and analyzing how these relationships influence and depend on each other, and how the quality of these relationships influences performance across the organization. Further research could also be done on how LMX and job embeddedness may interact to lead to higher job satisfaction. According to a study by Harris, Wheeler, and Kacmar (2011), LMX leads to job embeddedness, which then leads to higher job satisfaction. Job embeddedness is a measurement of the extent to which people feel a part of their company and it is also related to the many antecedents of LMX that are discussed above. Currently most of the research on LMX focuses more on behavioral and job performance outcomes than on employee's job satisfaction. Since employee job satisfaction can have many organizational benefits, this area might warrant further investigation.

== See also ==
- Social exchange theory
- Attribution (psychology)
- Transactional leadership
- Transformational leadership
