= Organizational citizenship behavior =

One's voluntary commitment within an organization or company

In industrial and organizational psychology, organizational citizenship behavior (OCB) is a person's voluntary commitment within an organization or company that is not part of their contractual tasks. Organizational citizenship behavior has been studied since the late 1970s. Over the past three decades, interest in these behaviors has increased substantially.

Organizational behavior has been linked to overall organizational effectiveness, thus these types of employee behaviors have important consequences in the workplace.

Organ expanded upon Katz's (1964) original work.

== Definition of the concept ==
Organ (1988) defines OCB as "individual behavior that is discretionary, not directly or explicitly recognized by the formal reward system, and that in the aggregate promotes the effective functioning of the organization". Organ's definition of OCB includes three critical aspects that are central to this construct:

1. First, OCBs are thought of as discretionary behaviors, which are not part of the job description, and are performed by the employee as a result of personal choice.
2. Second, OCBs go above and beyond that which is an enforceable requirement of the job description.
3. Finally, OCBs contribute positively to overall organizational effectiveness.

At the same time, Organ's (1988) definition of OCB has generated a great deal of criticism. The very nature of the construct makes it difficult to operationally define. Critics started questioning whether or not OCBs, as defined by Organ, were discretionary in nature. Organ (1997), in response to criticisms, notes that since his original definition, jobs have moved away from a clearly defined set of tasks and responsibilities and have evolved into much more ambiguous roles. Without a defined role, it quickly becomes difficult to define what is discretionary.

== Similar constructs ==
=== Contextual performance ===
OCB has often been compared to contextual performance. Similarly to OCB, this concept emerged in response to the realization that only looking at job specific work behaviors ignored a significant portion of the job domain. Originally, experts in this field focused only on activities that directly supported the output of the organization. As the job market became more aggressive, it became necessary for employees to go above and beyond that which is formally required by the job description in order to remain competitive. Contextual performance is defined as non-task related work behaviors and activities that contribute to the social and psychological aspects of the organization.

Contextual performance consists of four elements: persistence of enthusiasm, assistance to others, rule and proscribed procedure following, and openly defending the organizations objectives. OCB and contextual performance share their defining attributes as they both consist of behaviors other than those needed to perform the routine functions of the job. Both also require that these behaviors contribute to the overall success of the organization. Additionally, they also agree on the theme that these behaviors are discretionary and each employee chooses the amount and degree to which they will perform them. However, while contextual performance and OCB share a good part of their content domain, there are some important differences between the two constructs. One of the main requirements of OCBs is that they are not formally rewarded, which is not the case for contextual performance. Organ (1997) contends that OCBs may at some point encourage some sort of reward, but that these rewards would be indirect and uncertain. Also, contextual performance does not require that the behavior be extra-role, only that it be non-task. The differences between contextual performance and OCB are slight and easy to miss, however, they do exist.

=== Prosocial organizational behavior ===
OCB has also been compared to prosocial organizational behavior (POB). POB is defined as behavior within an organization that is aimed at improving the welfare of an individual, a group or an organization. The important distinction here is that this type of behavior, unlike OCB, can be unrelated to the organization. Thus, someone exhibiting prosocial behavior could be helping a coworker with personal matter.

=== Extra-role behavior ===
Extra-role behavior (ERB), first defined by Van Dyne, Cummings and Mclean-Parks (1995, as cited in Organ, Podsakoff, & MacKenzie, 2006), is another construct similar to OCB. ERB is defined as "behavior that attempts to benefit the organization and that goes beyond existing role expectations" (Organ et al., 2006, p. 33). While similar in many aspects, there do exist some important differences between OCB and ERB. Two concepts are a part of ERB that are not included in OCB: whistle blowing and principled organizational dissent. Whistle blowing involves the reporting of one employee by another so that unethical and or illegal practices are brought to the attention of authorities (Near & Miceli, 1987, as cited in Organ et al., 2006). Principled organizational dissent is when employees protest the organization because of some kind of injustice (Graham, 1986, as cited in Organ et al., 2006). Both of these ideas contribute to ERB in the sense that their purpose is to further the good of the organization and that they are not included in the formal job description. This again, is a construct very similar to OCB.

== Altruism and general compliance ==
Smith, Organ, and Near (1983) first proposed that OCB is composed of altruism and general compliance. These two dimensions serve to improve organizational effectiveness in different ways. Altruism in the workplace consists essentially of helping behaviors. These behaviors can both be directed within or outside of the organization. There is no direct link, or one-to-one relationship, between every instance of helping behavior and a specific gain for the organization. The idea is that over time, the compilation of employees helping behavior will eventually be advantageous for the organization (Organ et al., 2006).

General compliance behavior serves to benefit the organization in several ways. Low rates of absenteeism and rule following help to keep the organization running efficiently. A compliant employee does not engage in behaviors such as taking excessive breaks or using work time for personal matters. When these types of behaviors are minimized the workforce is naturally more productive.

Later, Organ (1988) deconstructed the dimension of general compliance and added additional dimensions of OCB. This deconstruction resulted in a five-factor model consisting of altruism, courtesy, conscientiousness, civic virtue, and sportsmanship. The definition of altruism remained much as it was, defined by discretionary behaviors that have the effect of helping a specific colleague with an organizationally relevant task or problem. Conscientiousness consists of behaviors that go well beyond the minimum role requirements of the organization (Law, Wong, & Chen, 2005). These behaviors indicate that employees accept and adhere to the rules, regulations, and procedures of the organization.

Civic virtue is characterized by behaviors that indicate the employee's deep concerns and interest in the life of the organization (Law et al., 2005). This dimension also encompasses positive involvement in the concerns of the organization (Organ et al., 2006). Examples of civic virtue can be seen in daily affairs such as attending meetings and keeping up with what is going on with the organization in general. Civic virtue can also be demonstrated on a larger scale by defending the organization's policies and practices when they are challenged by an outside source.

Courtesy has been defined as discretionary behaviors that aim at preventing work-related conflicts with others (Law et al., 2005). This dimension is a form of helping behavior, but one that works to prevent problems from arising. It also includes the word's literal definition of being polite and considerate of others (Organ et al., 2006). Examples of courteous behaviors are asking fellow employees if they would like a cup of coffee while you are getting one for yourself, making extra copies of the meeting agenda for your teammates, and giving a colleague ample notice when you alter something that will affect them.

Finally, sportsmanship has been defined as a willingness on the part of the employee that signifies the employee's tolerance of less-than-ideal organizational circumstances without complaining and blowing problems out of proportion. Organ et al. (2006) further define sportsmanship as an employee's "ability to roll with the punches" even if they do not like or agree with the changes that are occurring within the organization. By reducing the number of complaints from employees that administrators have to deal with, sportsmanship conserves time and energy.

It has been proven empirically that the factors listed above are the most robust and distinct factors in assessing OCB. However, in a meta-analysis of the OCB literature, LePine, Erez, and Johnson (2002) found that these five dimensions are very highly correlated and do not have much differentiation among antecedents, indicating some overlap in the dimensions.

== Behaviors directed at the individual and the organization ==
A different way of organizing the OCB construct was proposed by Williams and Anderson (1991). They divided up the dimensions of OCB into two different types of OCB based on whom the behaviors were directed at. Organizational citizenship behavior – individuals (OCBI) include behaviors that are aimed at other individuals in the workplace while organizational citizenship behavior-organizational (OCBO) include behaviors directed at the organization as a whole. Altruism and courtesy are actions aimed at other employees and thus fall under the umbrella of OCBIs. Conscientiousness, civic virtue, and sportsmanship are behaviors intended for the benefit of the organization and can subsequently be considered OCBOs. Those dimensions are widely used in organizational behavior studies e.g.

== Motivations for engaging in Organizational Citizenship Behaviour ==
Motivation plays an important role in driving individuals to engage in Organizational Citizenship Behavior (OCB). The underlying mechanisms that lead employees to engage in these extra-role behaviors are significant for both academic study and practical application in the field of public management.

=== Theories of Motivation ===
Several prominent theories in psychology and organizational behavior provide insights on the motivations behind OCB. One such theory is Abraham Maslow's hierarchy of needs. According to Maslow, individuals have a hierarchy of needs ranging from physiological needs to self-actualization. Once basic needs are met, individuals are motivated by higher-level needs, such as belongingness and esteem. In the context of OCB, employees who feel a sense of belonging and recognition are more likely to engage in discretionary behaviors that benefit the organization.

Another relevant theory is Frederick Herzberg's Two-Factor Theory. Herzberg distinguished between hygiene factors, which include extrinsic factors like salary and working conditions, and motivators, which comprise factors such as recognition and achievement. An illustrative example of this theory in action is when an organization provides a conducive work environment (hygiene factor) along with regular employee recognition programs (motivator). This combination can significantly contribute to a motivated workforce, more inclined towards engaging in OCB.

=== Intrinsic vs. Extrinsic Motivation ===
Motivation can be categorized into two primary types: intrinsic and extrinsic motivation. Intrinsic and extrinsic motivations play distinct roles in encouraging OCB. Intrinsic motivation stems from internal factors within an individual. It is characterized by a sense of personal satisfaction, enjoyment, or fulfillment derived from engaging with or performing an activity or task. Employees who are intrinsically motivated to excel in their roles are more likely to engage in OCB, as they find satisfaction in contributing beyond their basic job requirements. For instance, an employee might mentor a new team member not because of a specific reward, but because they find fulfillment in helping others grow professionally.

On the other hand, extrinsic motivation comes from external stimuli, typically in the form of rewards or punishments. Examples of extrinsic motivators include performance bonuses, incentives, recognition, promotions, or advancement opportunities.

In summary, while both intrinsic and extrinsic motivation can influence behavior, the former is often more closely associated with sustained engagement in OCB.

=== Public Sector and OCB ===
The public sector presents a unique context for considering OCB and its motivations. Research has shown that public sector employees often exhibit higher levels of OCB compared to their private sector counterparts. This can be attributed, in part, to the intrinsic motivation derived from the public service aspect of their roles. Public sector workers often have a strong sense of duty and commitment to the greater good, which can serve as a powerful motivator for engaging in behaviors that benefit the organization and the broader community.

Additionally, public sector organizations often have specific mission statements and values centered around public service, which can enhance employees' intrinsic motivation to engage in OCB. Research has highlighted the importance of organizational mission in fostering OCB in the public sector.

=== The Influence of Organizational Culture ===
Organizational culture plays a pivotal role in shaping the motivation for OCB. A culture that values teamwork, collaboration, and mutual respect fosters an environment where employees are more inclined to engage in discretionary efforts. Research indicates that when individuals perceive their organization as supportive, fair, and appreciative of their contributions, they are more likely to exhibit OCB. Additionally, organizations that celebrate and recognize OCB reinforce the intrinsic motivation among employees, further encouraging them to go above and beyond their formal job roles for the collective benefit of the organization.

=== The Role of Transformational Leadership ===
Transformational leadership has been identified as a significant predictor of employees engaging in OCB. This leadership style involves inspiring and motivating employees by creating a compelling vision of the future and empowering them to contribute meaningfully to organizational goals. Studies have shown that leaders who exhibit transformational qualities, such as charisma, intellectual stimulation, individualized consideration, and inspirational motivation, are more likely to foster a culture of OCB within their teams. By providing a supportive and empowering environment, transformational leaders can enhance employees' intrinsic motivation, leading to increased discretionary efforts and OCB.

=== Summary ===
Motivation plays a central role in OCB. Intrinsic factors, driven by purpose and fulfillment, are key in sustaining discretionary efforts. In the public sector, this commitment to the greater good is particularly pronounced. Fostering motivation, as well as a culture of collaboration and empowerment, assists to promote a culture of organizational citizenship.

== Gender differences ==
Research on gender-role stereotypes has gone on for decades. It is widely accepted that certain behaviors are considered more feminine and certain behaviors are considered more masculine. Feminine behaviors have been characterized as interpersonal in orientation and focused on a concern for others. Masculine behaviors, on the other hand, are typically more aggressive and independent (Spence & Helmreich, 1980). In line with these ideas, the OCB dimensions of altruism, courtesy, civic virtue and sportsmanship can be divided by gender role. Altruism and courtesy, previously mentioned as OCBIs, are considered in-role behavior for women, while civic virtue and sportsmanship, previously mentioned as OCBOs, are regarded as more in-role for men. The dimension of conscientiousness, which includes attention to detail and adherence to organizational rules, is excluded, as this dimension does not seem to adhere to any particular gender norm (Kidder & Parks, 2001).

== Counterproductive work behavior ==
Counterproductive work behavior (CWB) is defined as "intentional employee behavior that is harmful to the legitimate interests of an organization" (Dalal, 2005). When considering the definitions of OCB and CWB, it seems logical to assume that these constructs are opposites; one harms the organization and the other helps. Individuals might further assume that by engaging in one of these types of behaviors, an individual will not tend to engage in the other. However, a recent meta-analysis, Dalal (2005), found that this is not the case. The results of this analysis indicate that these constructs only shared a little to moderate negative correlation and furthermore showed differences in magnitude and pattern of relationships between various antecedents and the two constructs. These results indicate that CWB and OCB are two separate constructs and should be conceptualized as thus.

== Antecedents ==
Early research regarding the antecedents of OCB focused on employee attitudes, dispositions, and leader supportiveness. More recently, many different variables have been examined in the effort to determine the antecedents of OCB. Commonly studied antecedents of OCB are job satisfaction, perceptions of organizational justice, organizational commitment, personality characteristics, task characteristics, and leadership behavior. These antecedents have been analyzed at both the overall and individual OCB levels.

One of the most intuitive antecedents of OCB is job satisfaction. Organ and Ryan (1995) conducted a meta-analysis of 28 studies and found a modest relationship between job satisfaction and OCB. This relationship was stronger than the relationship between job satisfaction and in-role performance. Other attitudinal measures, perceived fairness, organizational commitment, and leader supportiveness are found to correlate with OCB at about the same rate as satisfaction (Organ & Ryan, 1995).

In terms of personality characteristics, conscientiousness, agreeableness, and positive and negative affectivity garner the most support as antecedents of OCB (Podsakoff, MacKenzie, Paine, & Bachrach, 2000). Conscientiousness, in particular, has been found to have a strong relationship with the general compliance component of OCB (Organ et al., 2006). However, it has also been reported that personality measures are weaker predictors of OCB when compared to attitudinal predictors (Organ & Ryan, 1995).

Task characteristics such as feedback, routinization, and intrinsic satisfaction are found to be significantly related to altruism, courtesy, conscientiousness, sportsmanship, and civic virtue. Positive relationships were found between both task feedback and intrinsic satisfaction and OCB, while a negative relationship was found between task routinization and OCB. Even though task characteristics have been found to predict OCB, some debate exists as to whether this is a direct effect or a relationship mediated by job satisfaction (Todd & Kent, 2006).

Leadership behaviors have also been found to be an important predictor of OCB. These behaviors fall into four categories: transformational leadership behavior, transactional leadership behavior, behaviors having to do with the path-goal theory of leadership, and behaviors having to do with the leader-member exchange theory. Transformational leadership behaviors, including articulating a vision, providing an appropriate model, fostering the acceptance of group goals, high performance expectations, and intellectual stimulation, have significant positive relationships with Organ's dimensions of OCB. Two types of behaviors representative of transactional leadership style, contingent reward behavior and non-contingent punishment behavior, have significant relationships with Organ's dimensions of OCB. Additionally, both the supportive leadership and leader role clarification aspects of the path-goal theory of leadership are positively related to OCB. Podsakoff et al. (2000) found that leader-member exchange was positively related to altruism and an overall composite measure of OCB.

== Consequences ==
During the early 1990s, scholars gained real momentum in the area of OCB with regard to empirical research. Empirical research regarding the consequences of OCBs has focused on two main areas: organizational performance and success and managerial evaluations of performance and reward allocation. Some evidence also exists on the impacts of OCB on the employees themselves.

=== Organizational performance and success ===
Multiple studies and meta-analyses have been conducted to look at the relationship between OCBs and organizational performance and success. Podsakoff and MacKenzie (1994, as cited in Organ et al., 2006) looked at an insurance agency and found that the OCBs civic virtue and sportsmanship were both significantly related to indices of sales performance. Podsakoff, Ahearne, and MacKenzie (1997, as cited in Organ et al., 2006) examined paper mill workers and found that helping behavior was significantly related to product quality. MacKenzie, Podsakoff, and Ahearne (1996, as cited in Organ et al., 2006) found that civic virtue and helping behavior were significantly related to the percent of team quota sales. Walz and Niehoff (2000) examined 30 different restaurants and found that helping behavior was significantly related to operating efficiency, customer satisfaction, and quality of performance. Researchers found that helping behavior was also negatively correlated with wasted food. Koys (2001, as cited in Organ et al., 2006) used a combination of OCB dimensions to form a composite measure of OCB. Results from this study indicated that the composite measure of OCB was positively correlated with restaurant profits.

More recently, Podsakoff, Blume, Whiting, and Podsakoff (2009) found that OCBs were positively related to unit-level performance and customer satisfaction. Nielsen, Hrivnak, and Shaw (2009), in their meta-analytic review of the existing group literature, examined the relationship between OCBs and performance at the group level. These researchers found a positive and significant relationship between overall OCB and performance at the group level. In addition, Nielsen et al. (2009) found that similar patterns of relationships existed for each dimension of OCB: civic virtue, sportsmanship, altruism, conscientiousness, and courtesy.

=== Managerial evaluations and reward allocations ===
With regard to the relationship between OBs and managerial evaluations, Podsakoff and colleagues (2000) found, in a summary of empirical evidence, that OCBs uniquely accounted for 42.9% of the variance in managerial performance evaluations. Results from this study also indicated that altruism or helping was significantly related to performance evaluations in eight out of the ten studies it was included in; sportsmanship was significantly related to performance evaluations in five out of the eight studies it was included in; conscientiousness was significantly related to performance evaluations in all three of the studies it was included in; and civic virtue was significantly related to performance evaluations in six out of the eight studies it was included in.

More recently, Podsakoff et al. (2009) found that OCBs have a positive relationship with performance ratings and reward allocations. Podsakoff, Whiting, Podsakoff, and Mishra (2010) examined the effects of job candidates' tendency to exhibit OCBs on selection decisions made in the context of a job interview. These researchers found that candidates whose interview responses indicated a tendency to engage in helping others, challenge the status quo by voicing their opinions, and support and defend an organization were generally viewed as more competent, received higher overall evaluations, and received higher recommended starting salaries than those who did not.

Research has also looked at the relationship between task-performance, CWB, and OCB with overall managerial evaluations. When compared with task-performance and CWB, OCB is found to contribute least to overall managerial evaluations (Rotundo & Sackett, 2002). This somewhat inconsistent pattern of results across the OCB literature with regard to antecedents exemplifies the need for more research in this area.

=== The effects of OCB on employees ===
There is some tension visible in the existing literature on the effects of OCB on the employees who perform these citizenship behaviours. Allowing employees some scope to work outside their formal roles is thought to enhance the employee experience and lower turnover intentions and actual turnover (Podsakoff et al., 2009). However, these benefits of OCB appear to come at a cost. Emotional exhaustion and conflict between home life and work are both higher for conscientious employees, and these effects are stronger amongst employees exhibiting high in-role performance (Deery, Rayton, Walsh and Kinnie, 2016).

=== Citizenship fatigue ===
Citizenship fatigue occurs when OCB activities contribute to an employee “feeling worn out, tired, or on edge,” which in turn leads to reduced future OCB activity. While performance of job duties may remain high, the nature of OCB as additional activity can see atrophy through employee exhaustion. Citizenship fatigue acts on both affect and cognition meaning that a sense of OCB burnout can be coupled with the perception that OCB activities are causing the feelings of burnout.

A study of 273 employees over multiple points in time found that “perceived organisational support, quality of team-member exchange (TMX) relationships, and pressure to engage in OCB” affect the interplay between OCB and citizenship fatigue. A perceived lack of support from the organisation correlates with citizenship fatigue, which workers may compensate for in other areas, such as working longer hours. Older workers were less likely to report citizenship fatigue.

High citizenship pressure does not appear to correlate to citizenship fatigue rates, but where citizenship pressure is low, higher OCB levels correlated with decreased citizenship fatigue. Further, TMX situations where employees are conscientious and supportive of each other's interests appear to decrease citizenship fatigue, although low-TMX seems to have nil impact.

Citizenship fatigue is reduced where OCB enjoys high organisational support, high-quality TMX relationships, and pressure to engage in OCB is low. Conversely, citizenship fatigue is amplified when perceived organisational support is low, TMX relationships are low in quality, and there is perceived pressure to engage in OCB.

=== Career outcomes ===
A study of the relationship between OCB, task performance, and career outcomes in outcome-based professional services gauged potential consequences of OCB engagement. Time spent on task performance and OCB were positively related to performance evaluations, which in turn strongly determine promotion. Controlled for advancement speed, however, performance evaluation merely allows entry into a “tournament” where the most deserving candidate for promotion “wins.” Task performance determines speed of advancement, so time spent on OCB can contribute to a slower promotion rate.

Task performance also appears to be more important than OCB in an outcome-based system, where OCB participation correlates “significantly and negatively” to task performance. In a professional services firm where a consultant's time is the outcome, the OCB/task performance trade off is “immediate and apparent.” In a sales-oriented firm the effect lags and is less apparent because the outcome of sales productivity is not immediately manifest.

There is a cost indicated to individuals engaging in OCB in an outcome-based system, with task performance proving much more important for increasing salary and enabling promotion. Conversely, OCB correlates negatively to salary and has nil impact on promotion. In short, OCB participation in may distract from task performance and negatively impact career advancement in an outcome-based system.

=== Workplace happiness ===
A study of 260 hospital physicians found workplace happiness positively affected OCB, with diversity management perceptions mediating the relationship between them. Diversity management enabled satisfaction with leaders, work environment and job tasks, but also enhanced feelings of respect, fair treatment, and inclusion, despite outward differences. In turn, this encouraged OCB activity such as inter-colleague assistance, working to high standard, organisational affiliation, and conflict resolution.

Findings are in line with attitudinal theory, in which a worker's positive behaviour is mainly formed by their perception of a positive attitude from their employer, but also reflects social exchange theory wherein a worker cares about their organisation where they experience “economic and sociopsychological appreciation.” Engagement, job satisfaction and emotional attachment to the organisation are often translated into OCBs including “passion, proactivity, persistence and affiliation” for organisational betterment.

=== Presenteeism ===
Presenteeism is where employees attend work despite ill-health. A study viewing presenteeism through Social Information Processing (SIP) Theory found that presenteeism has a positive indirect effect on co-workers' OCB activities through citizenship pressure. According to SIP theory, individuals are adaptive, and able to modify beliefs and behaviours to a given social environment. Citizenship pressure is a key social theoretical mechanism which encourages co-workers of presentees to engage in OCBs, in response to a change in the operating environment.

It is also suggested that presenteeism itself is an OCB, in that it surpasses the formal demands of a role, supports organizational functioning, and is generally unrewarded. In turn, employees who perceive citizenship pressure enact their own OCBs.

The authors posit that psychological detachment from the organisation is the moderator between OCB and citizenship pressure, as psychological distance from the organisation enables the individual to respond to specific environmental cues. Conformity is toward social stimuli in the immediate environment, informed by citizenship pressure. In turn, the authors reason, that “employees who are high on psychological detachment are more likely to conform to citizenship pressure with OCBs.”

Thus, presenteeism can both be and enable OCBs; however, care must be taken to address possible negative reactions or harmful outcomes, and to ensure presenteeism is not explicitly encouraged as a means of encouraging OCB.

== Measures ==
Researchers have developed a variety of measures for OCB. However, before being able to measure a construct it must be defined. As discussed earlier, this is not a cut and dried task. Thus, the conceptual definitions of OCB used by researches differ from study to study.

Bateman and Organ's (1983) study was one of the first to tackle the measurement of OCB. Their definition of OCB "includes any of those gestures (often taken for granted) that lubricate the social machinery of the organization but that do not directly inhere in the usual notion of task performance" (Bateman & Organ, 1983, p. 588). Based on this definition, they constructed a 30-item OCB scale that measured cooperation, altruism, compliance, punctuality, housecleaning, protecting company property, conscientiously following company rules, and dependability. The scale asked each participant to rate their agreement or disagreement with each of the 30 items using a 7-point scale that ranged from negative 3 to positive 3.

Another important early study was Smith et al. (1983), which took a slightly more complicated measurement approach by developing a scale in stages. In order to develop their 16-item scale, these researchers interviewed managers in manufacturing organizations and asked them to "identify instances of helpful, but not absolutely required behavior" (Smith et al., 1983, p. 656). The researchers created a 20-item scale based on the interviews in addition to the scale items used in the Bateman and Organ (1983) study mentioned previously. The third step involved administering the scale to a group of 67 students who had managerial experience. The students were asked to complete the scale while thinking of someone who currently, or had in the past, worked for them. Students then described the person's work behavior and their responses to the scale items. After factor analysis, four items were dropped resulting in the 16-item scale. It is with this scale that the authors found results indicating the first two distinct dimensions of OCB: altruism and generalized compliance. Examples of items in Smith et al.'s (1983) scale include:

- Helps others who have been absent.
- Gives advance notice if unable to come to work.
- Assists supervisor with his or her work.
- Attend functions not required but that help company image.

In 1990, Podsakoff, MacKenzie, Moorman, and Fetter conducted an important study using the five dimensions of OCB: altruism, conscientiousness, sportsmanship, courtesy, and civic virtue. These researchers developed a 24-item scale by having 10 of their colleagues sort each of the 24 items into one of the five OCB dimensions or an "other" category if they felt the item did not fit any of the five defined conceptual dimensions. Participants were asked to indicate their level of agreement using a 7-point scale ranging from "strongly disagree" to "strongly agree." This five-factor structure has served as the building block for a substantial amount of OCB research. Examples of items in Podsakoff et al.'s (1990) scale include:

- Obeys company rules and regulations even when no one is watching.
- Attends meetings that are not mandatory, but are considered important.
- Mindful of how his/her behavior affects other people's jobs.
- Willingly helps others who have work related problems.
