= Organizational commitment =

Concept in organizational behavior

In organizational behavior and industrial and organizational psychology, organizational commitment is an individual's psychological attachment to the organization. Organizational scientists have also developed many nuanced definitions of organizational commitment, and numerous scales to measure them. Exemplary of this work is Meyer and Allen's model of commitment, which was developed to integrate numerous definitions of commitment that had been proliferated in the literature. Meyer and Allen's model has also been critiqued because the model is not consistent with empirical findings. It may also not be fully applicable in domains such as customer behavior. There has also been debate surrounding what Meyers and Allen's model was trying to achieve.

The basis behind many of these studies was to find ways to improve how workers feel about their jobs so that these workers would become more committed to their organizations.

Organizational commitment predicts work variables such as turnover, organizational citizenship behavior, and job performance. Some of the factors such as role stress, empowerment, job insecurity and employability, and distribution of leadership have been shown to be connected to a worker's sense of organizational commitment.

== Model of commitment ==
Meyer and Allen's (1991) three-component model of commitment was created to argue that commitment has three different components that correspond with different psychological states. Meyer and Allen created this model for two reasons: first "aid in the interpretation of existing research" and second "to serve as a framework for future research". Their study was based mainly around previous studies of organizational commitment.

Meyer and Allen's research indicated that there are three "mind sets" which can characterize an employee's commitment to the organization. Mercurio (2015) extended this model by reviewing the empirical and theoretical studies on organizational commitment. Mercurio posits that emotional, or affective commitment is the core essence of organizational commitment.

=== Affective commitment ===
Affective Commitment is defined as the employee's positive emotional attachment to the organization. Meyer and Allen pegged AC as the "desire" component of organizational commitment. An employee who is affectively committed strongly identifies with the goals of the organization and desires to remain a part of the organization. This employee commits to the organization because they "want to".

This commitment can be influenced by many different demographic characteristics: age, tenure, sex, and education but these influences are neither strong nor consistent. The problem with these characteristics is that while they can be seen, they cannot be clearly defined. Meyer and Allen gave this example that "positive relationships between tenure and commitment maybe due to tenure-related differences in job status and quality" In developing this concept, Meyer and Allen drew largely on Mowday, Porter, and Steers's (2006) concept of commitment, which in turn drew on earlier work by Kanter (1968). Mercurio (2015) stated that..."affective commitment was found to be an enduring, demonstrably indispensable, and central characteristic of organizational commitment".

=== Continuance commitment ===
Continuance commitment is the "need" component or the gains versus losses of working in an organization.

"Side bets", or investments, are the gains and losses that may occur should an individual stay or leave an organization. An individual may commit to the organization because he/she perceives a high cost of losing organizational membership (cf. Becker's 1960 "side bet theory").

Things like economic costs (such as pension accruals) and social costs (friendship ties with co-workers) would be costs of losing organizational membership. But an individual doesn't see the positive costs as enough to stay with an organization they must also take into account the availability of alternatives (such as another organization), disrupt personal relationships, and other "side bets" that would be incurred from leaving their organization. The problem with this is that these "side bets" don't occur at once but that they "accumulate with age and tenure".

=== Normative commitment ===
The individual commits to and remains with an organization because of feelings of obligation, the last component of organizational commitment. These feelings may derive from a strain on an individual before and after joining an organization. For example, the organization may have invested resources in training an employee who then feels a 'moral' obligation to put forth effort on the job and stay with the organization to 'repay the debt.' It may also reflect an internalized norm, developed before the person joins the organization through family or other socialization processes, that one should be loyal to one's organization. The employee stays with the organization because he/she "ought to". But generally if an individual invest a great deal they will receive "advanced rewards".

Normative commitment is higher in organizations that value loyalty and systematically communicate the fact to employees with rewards, incentives and other strategies. Normative commitment in employees is also high where employees regularly see visible examples of the employer being committed to employee well-being. An employee with greater organizational commitment has a greater chance of contributing to organizational success and will also experience higher levels of job satisfaction. High levels of job satisfaction, in turn, reduces employee turnover and increases the organization's ability to recruit and retain talent. Meyer and Allen based their research in this area more on theoretical evidence rather than empirical, which may explain the lack of depth in this section of their study compared to the others. They drew off Wiener's (2005) research for this commitment component.

=== Critique to the three-component model ===
Since the model was made, there has been conceptual critique to what the model is trying to achieve. Specifically from three psychologists, Omar Solinger, Woody Olffen, and Robert Roe. To date, the three-component conceptual model has been regarded as the leading model for organizational commitment because it ties together three aspects of earlier commitment research (Becker, 2005; Buchanan, 2005; Kanter, 1968; Mathieu & Zajac, 1990; Mowday, Porter, & Steers, 1982; Salancik, 2004; Weiner, 2004; Weiner & Vardi, 2005). However, a collection of studies have shown that the model is not consistent with empirical findings. Solinger, Olffen, and Roe use a later model by Alice Eagly and Shelly Chaiken, Attitude-behavior Model (2004), to present that TCM combines different attitude phenomena. They have come to the conclusion that TCM is a model for predicting turnover. In a sense the model describes why people should stay with the organization whether it is because they want to, need to, or ought to. The model appears to mix together an attitude toward a target, that being the organization, with an attitude toward a behavior, which is leaving or staying. They believe the studies should return to the original understanding of organizational commitment as an attitude toward the organization and measure it accordingly. Although the TCM is a good way to predict turnover, these psychologists do not believe it should be the general model. Because Eagly and Chaiken's model is so general, it seems that the TCM can be described as a specific subdivision of their model when looking at a general sense of organizational commitment. It becomes clear that affective commitment equals an attitude toward a target, while continuance and normative commitment are representing different concepts referring to anticipated behavioral outcomes, specifically staying or leaving. This observation backs up their conclusion that organizational commitment is perceived by TCM as combining different target attitudes and behavioral attitudes, which they believe to be both confusing and logically incorrect. The attitude-behavioral model can demonstrate explanations for something that would seem contradictory in the TCM. That is that affective commitment has stronger associations with relevant behavior and a wider range of behaviors, compared to normative and continuance commitment. Attitude toward a target (the organization) is obviously applicable to a wider range of behaviors than an attitude toward a specific behavior (staying). After their research, Sollinger, Olffen, and Roe believe Eagly and Chaiken's attitude-behavior model from 1993 would be a good alternative model to look at as a general organizational commitment predictor because of its approach at organizational commitment as a singular construct, which in turn would help predicting various behaviors beyond turnover.

=== A five component commitment model ===
More recently, scholars have proposed a five component model of commitment, though it has been developed in the context of product and service consumption. This model proposes habitual and forced commitment as two additional dimensions which are very germane in consumption settings. It seems, however, that habitual commitment or inertial may also become relevant in many job settings. People get habituated to a job—the routine, the processes, the cognitive schemas associated with a job can make people develop a latent commitment to the job—just as it may occur in a consumption setting. The paper—by Keiningham and colleagues also compared applications of the TCM in job settings and in consumption settings to develop additional insights.

== Job satisfaction ==
Job satisfaction is commonly defined as the extent to which employees like their work. Researchers have examined Job satisfaction for the past several decades. Studies have been devoted to figuring out the dimensions of job satisfaction, antecedents of job satisfaction, and the relationship between satisfaction and commitment. Satisfaction has also been examined under various demographics of gender, age, race, education, and work experience. Most research on job satisfaction has been aimed towards the person-environment fit paradigm. Job satisfaction has been found to be an important area of research because one of the top reasons individuals give for leaving a job is dissatisfaction.

Much of the literature on the relationship between commitment and satisfaction with one's job indicates that if employees are satisfied they develop stronger commitment to their work. Kalleberg (1990) studied work attitudes of workers in the US and Japan and found a correlation of 0.73 between job satisfaction and organizational commitment of workers in Japan and a higher significant correlation of 0.81 among Americans. A study conducted by Dirani and Kuchinke produced results indicating a strong correlation between job commitment and job satisfaction and that satisfaction was a reliable predictor of commitment. Job satisfaction among employees—at least in retail settings—can also strengthen the association between customer satisfaction and customer loyalty.

Perceiving a "Calling"
A study at the University of Florida found a positive correlation between the individual's perception of their career being a "calling" and the level of commitment to the job. This study looked at the relation between work commitment and participant's perception of meaning in their job. Participants were tested in the areas of; perceiving a calling, job satisfaction, and job commitment. Results showed a moderate correlation between participants perceiving a calling and job commitment and a weak correlation between perceiving a calling and job satisfaction.

== Other factors ==
=== Role Stress ===
Dysfunctions in role performance have been associated with a large number of consequences, almost always negative, which affect the well being of workers and functioning of organizations. An individual's experience of receiving incompatible or conflicting requests (role conflict) and/or the lack of enough information to carry out his/her job (role ambiguity) are causes of role stress. Role ambiguity and conflict decrease worker's performance and are positively related to the probability of the workers leaving the organization. Role conflict and ambiguity have been proposed as determining factors of workers' job satisfaction and organizational commitment.

=== Empowerment ===
Empowerment in the workplace has had several different definitions over the years. It has been considered 'energizing followers through leadership, enhancing self efficacy by reducing powerlessness and increasing intrinsic task motivation.' A psychological view of empowerment describes it as 'a process of intrinsic motivation, perceived control, competence, and energizing towards achieving goals.' There are two prominent concepts of empowerment. The first is Structural Empowerment which comes from the Organizational/Management Theory and is described as the ability to get things done and to mobilize resources. The second is Psychological Empowerment which comes from Social Psychological models and is described as psychological perceptions/attitudes of employees about their work and their organizational roles. A study done by Ahmad et al. found support for the relationship between empowerment and job satisfaction and job commitment. The study looked at nurses working in England and nurses working in Malaysia. Taking cultural context into consideration, the study still showed a positive correlation between empowerment and job satisfaction/commitment.

=== Job Insecurity and Employability ===
In a study conducted by De Cuyper research found that workers who were on fixed-term contracts or considered "temporary workers" reported higher levels of job insecurity than permanent workers. Job insecurity was found to negatively correlate with job satisfaction and affective organizational commitment in permanent workers. The study also found that job satisfaction and organizational commitment were highly correlated with being a permanent worker.

=== Distribution of Leadership ===
A study conducted by Hulpia et al. focused on the impact of the distribution of leadership and leadership support among teachers and how that affected job satisfaction and commitment. The study found that there was a strong relationship between organizational commitment and the cohesion of the leadership team and the amount of leadership support. Previously held beliefs about job satisfaction and commitment among teachers was that they were negatively correlated with absenteeism and turnover and positively correlated with job effort and job performance. This study examined how one leader (usually a principal) effected the job satisfaction and commitment of teachers. The study found that when leadership was distributed by the 'leader' out to the teachers as well workers reported higher job satisfaction and organizational commitment than when most of the leadership fell to one person. Even when it was only the perception of distributed leadership roles workers still reported high levels of job satisfaction/commitment.

== Shift to organizational change commitment ==
By the end of the 1990s, leaders did not find the value in understanding whether or not their people were more or less committed to the organization. It was particularly frustrating that leaders could see that people committed to the organization were not as committed to strategic change initiatives, the majority of which failed to live up to expectations. John Meyer responded to this gap by proposing a model of organizational change commitment.

The new model includes the same 3-components, but also includes a behavioral commitment scale: resistance, passive resistance, compliance, cooperation, and championing. Though Meyer does not cite him, a peer reviewed source for behavioral commitment comes from Leon Coetsee in South Africa. Coetsee brought the resistance-to-commitment model of Harvard consultant Arnold Judson to academic research and has continued developing the model as late as 2011.

== Guidelines to enhance ==
Five rules help to enhance organizational commitment:

Commit to people-first values
Put it in writing, hire the right-kind managers, and walk the talk.
Clarify and communicate your mission
Clarify the mission and ideology; make it charismatic; use value-based hiring practices; stress values-based orientation and training; build tradition.
Guarantee organizational justice
Have a comprehensive grievance procedure; provide for extensive two-way communications.
Community of practice
Build value-based homogeneity; share and share alike; emphasize barnraising, cross-utilization, and teamwork; getting people to work together.
Support employee development
Commit to actualizing; provide first-year job challenge; enrich and empower; promote from within; provide developmental activities; provide employee security without guarantees.

== See also ==
- Employee engagement
- High commitment management
- Job satisfaction
- Onboarding
- Organizational justice
- Person-environment fit
- Psychological contract
- Stigma management
