= Mental health day =

Absence for mental health reasons

In workplaces, especially in Australia, a mental health day is where an employee takes sick leave, or where a student does not attend school for a day or longer, for reasons other than physical illness. Mental health days are believed to reduce absenteeism and presenteeism, which is a reduction in productivity or other negative consequences resulting from a pressure to work. Mental health days differ from absenteeism in that the purpose is to reset one's mental health rather than due to a nonspecific desire or feeling to skip work.

== Motivation ==
Major depressive disorder, bipolar disorder, attention deficit hyperactivity disorder and other mental illnesses, along with moods such as stress, depression, and anxiety, can cause impairment on workplace functioning and learning. There is evidence in the United States that inadequate managerial support for mental illnesses and negative moods has led to increased absenteeism, morbidity, and an estimated US$300 billion yearly loss as a result of workplace stress.

The stigma associated with mental illness also restricts the ability of students and employees to claim sick leave for mental health. One interpretation of the term "mental health day" is to function as an alternative wording to "sick day" to avoid stigma from workplace mental health issues, so that employees are more able to express difficulty and request support.

A 2010 study showed that one third of workers "admit to faking an illness to get the day off work because they feel they are not coping." According to a 2016 study among nurses, approximately 54% of the 5041 respondents reported taking mental health days as a form of sickness absence over the previous 12 months, with many citing experiences of workplace abuse. The study also found that nurses who took these mental health days were more likely to plan on leaving their current job within the next year.

== Legality ==
In Australia, according to the Fair Work Act 2009, employees are entitled to use sick leave and personal leave since according to the Fair Work Ombudsman, personal illness includes stress that may impact an employee's mental health. Since casual workers in Australia do not receive sick leave, this means they are not able through the Fair Work Act 2009 to have a mental health day, however negotiation with employers is possible. People with mental disorders do not need to disclose the conditions for this purpose unless they pose a harm to themselves or other people, however disclosing the issues may enable employers to better accommodate needs.

Most countries have no law requiring employees to produce a medical certificate for only one day of absence. However, in 2010, the National government of New Zealand proposed a law to require a medical certificate for one day of absence, and the employer must cover the cost of obtaining the certificate if the duration of absence is less than three consecutive days.

In the United States, under the Americans with Disabilities Act of 1990, individuals can have mental health days as part of "reasonable accommodations" for a disclosed mental illness. In other cases such as for stress, taking time off is allowed entirely at the discretion of the employer.

== See also ==
- Emotional exhaustion
- Industrial and organizational psychology
- Mental disorder
- Occupational burnout
- Occupational health psychology
- Occupational safety and health
- Occupational stress
- Perceived psychological contract violation
- Perceived organizational support
