= Psychological contract =

Concept in organizational theory

A psychological contract, a concept developed in contemporary research by organizational scholar Denise Rousseau, represents the mutual beliefs, perceptions, and informal obligations between an employer and an employee. It sets the dynamics for the relationship and defines the detailed practicality of the work to be done. It is distinguishable from the formal written contract of employment which, for the most part, only identifies mutual duties and responsibilities in a generalized form.

Although Rousseau's 1989 article as highlighted by Coyle-Shapiro "was very influential in guiding contemporary research", the concept of the psychological contract was first introduced by Chris Argyris (1960):

Since the foremen realize the employees in this system will tend to produce optimally under passive leadership, and since the employees agree, a relationship may be hypothesized to evolve between the employees and the foremen which might be called the "psychological work contract." The employee will maintain the high production, low grievances, etc., if the foremen guarantee and respect the norms of the employee informal culture (i.e., let the employees alone, make certain they make adequate wages, and have secure jobs).

Psychological contracts are defined by the relationship between an employer and an employee where there are unwritten mutual expectations for each side. A psychological contract is rather defined as a philosophy, not a formula or devised plan. One could characterize a psychological contract through qualities like respect, compassion, objectivity, and trust. Psychological contracts are formed by beliefs about exchange agreements and may arise in a large variety of situations that are not necessarily employer-employee. However, it is most significant in its function as defining the workplace relationship between employer and employee. In this capacity, the psychological contract is an essential, yet implicit agreement that defines employer-employee relationships. These contracts can cause virtuous and vicious circles in some circumstances. Multiple scholars define the psychological contract as a perceived exchange of agreement between an individual and another party. The psychological contract is a type of social exchange relationship. Parallels are drawn between the psychological contract and social exchange theory because the relationship's worth is defined through a cost-benefit analysis. The implicit nature of the psychological contract makes it difficult to define, although there is some consensus on its nature. This consensus identifies psychological contracts as "promissory, implicit, reciprocal, perceptual, and based on expectations."

These psychological contracts can be impacted by many things like mutual or conflicting morals and values between employer and employee, external forces like the nudge theory, and relative forces like Adams' equity theory.

== History ==
The concept of psychological contract became more popular among researchers starting in the 1990s, but was named decades earlier in 1960 by Chris Argyris. As studies in industrial relations developed and grew more complex, it was revealed that employees are more likely to perform better in certain work environments. The works of Frederick Winslow Taylor in the first decades of the 20th century focused on how to enhance worker efficiency. Building upon this, Douglas McGregor developed Theory X and Theory Y in the 1950s to define two contrasting types of management styles that were each effective in attaining a certain goal. These differing management types hold different psychological contracts between employer and employee (described in more detail below in § The formation of the contract).

Works by Denise M. Rousseau and later described the psychological contract in more depth. Sandra L. Robinson indicated employees commonly reported a breach of the psychological contract within several years of beginning their position, and that the effects of contract breach negatively affected employee productivity and retention.

Maslach, Schaufeli and Leiter stated in 2001:

Now employees are expected to give more in terms of time, effort, skills, and flexibility, whereas they receive less in terms of career opportunities, lifetime employment, job security, and so on. Violation of the psychological contract is likely to produce burnout because it erodes the notion of reciprocity, which is crucial in maintaining well-being.

== Formation of the contract ==
Psychological contract formation is a process whereby the employer and the employee or prospective employee develop and refine their mental maps of one another. According to the outline of phases of psychological contract formation, the contracting process begins before the employment itself and develops throughout the course of employment. As the employment relationship grows, the psychological contract also grows and is reinforced over time. However, the psychological contract is effective only if it is consented to voluntarily. It is also useful in revealing what incentives workers may expect to receive in return for their employment. There are two types of contracts depending on the nature of the relationship between employee and employer. These are relational psychological contracts and transactional psychological contracts.

1. Transactional psychological contract: focuses more on the explicit elements of the contract without accounting much for the intrinsic motivations of workers. These are more common in organizations with authoritative management styles and hierarchal control. Transactional contracts are found to be "related to careerism, lack of trust in employer, and greater resistance to change." They tend to be shorter term in nature.
  Some scholars consider McGregor's Theory X to be closely related to transactional employer-employee relationships or authoritarian management, which are bound by transactional psychological contracts that aim to keep people working for extrinsic reasons and maintain the status quo.
2. Relational psychological contract: stresses the interdependence of the organization and level of social exchange. These psychological contracts tend to be longer-term in nature.
  McGregor's Theory Y is seen in participative management which emphasizes the role of leadership. This has similarities with relational psychological contracts in terms of common emphasis on commitment and belief in the intrinsic motivations of people who may want to work for something beyond merely monetary reasons. Relational contracts are found to be associated with trust and increased acceptance of change.

The content of psychological contracts varies widely depending on several factors including management style, as discussed earlier. It also depends on the type of profession and differs widely based on the stage in the career; for example, between graduates and managers. Denise Rousseau is credited with outlining these 5 phases of contract formation:

1. Pre-employment: The initial expectations of the employee form through professional norms and societal beliefs that may be influenced by information gathered about the organization and how certain occupations are portrayed by the media.
2. Recruitment: The first instance of two-way communication involving promise exchanges between employer and prospective employee during the recruiting process.
3. Early socialization: Promise exchanges continue with both parties actively continuing their search for information about one another through multiple sources.
4. Later experiences: The promise exchange and search for information processes slow down as the employee is no longer considered new. There may be changes to the psychological contract introduced at this stage.
5. Evaluation: The existing psychological contract is evaluated and possibly revised and it is determined whether a revision is needed. Incentives and costs of change impact revision.

The psychological contract model is applicable not only to supervisor-subordinate relationships but also to business relationships. In 2015, a study was conducted on hotel franchising. Franchising is an agreement between a brand owner and franchisee that grants the franchisee rights to use the brand in exchange for a fee. According to the study, apart from this, the franchisee agreement includes an unwritten psychological contract agreement, consisting of unwritten promises and obligations between both parties.

== Stages in career development ==
The employment relationship emerges through the interpersonal relationships formed in the workplace. How employers, supervisors and managers behave on a day-to-day basis is not determined by the legal contract. Employees slowly negotiate what they must do to satisfy their side of the bargain, and what they can expect in return. This negotiation is sometimes explicit, e.g. in appraisal or performance review sessions, but it more often takes the form of behavioral action and reaction through which parties explore and draw the boundaries of mutual expectation. Hence, the psychological contract determines what the parties will, or will not do and how it will be done. When the parties' expectations match each other, performance is likely to be good and satisfaction levels will be high. So long as the values and loyalty persist, trust and commitment will be maintained.

The map followed by the parties is the development of an individualized career path that makes only reasonable demands on the employee, with adequate support from managers and co-workers, for a level of remuneration that is demonstrably fair for a person of that age, educational background, and experience. Motivation and commitment will be enhanced if transfers and promotions follow the agreed path in a timely fashion.

The psychological contract changes over time. Since an employee's level of work changes as they advance in their career, the psychological contract that was established when they first began their career changes, too. As an employee is promoted throughout their career they expect more from their psychological contract because they are putting more of themselves into their work. Each stage of a career creates another editing process to the contract. The stages include apprentice, colleague, mentor, sponsor, exploration, establishment, maintenance, and disengagement. The details of each step are as follows:

1. Apprentice stage: Employees are new to the company and are expected to learn what they are supposed to do in this stage under the supervision of people in higher stages. Employees do their best to meet the expectations of the employer.
2. Colleague stage: Employees in this stage work more independently and handle tasks without supervision. They work harder to prove to the employer they are capable of completing assignments alone.
3. Mentor stage: Employees in this stage have the ability to oversee apprentices and guide them while also completing their own work.
4. Sponsor stage: Employees in this stage take on managerial roles and help better the company rather than oversee apprentices like in the mentor stage.
5. Exploration stage: Employees in this stage are new and have an unclear path in their career and are uncertain if they will stay with the same organization. They search for guidance and motivation from the organization to help them make decisions about their future.
6. Establishment stage: Employees in this stage want to establish themselves in their organization. Employees want more responsibilities, more opportunities for promotion, and performance-based rewards.
7. Maintenance stage: Employees in this stage feel as if their role in the organization has reached a stagnation and care to pursue other things in life besides just work.
8. Disengagement stage: Employees in this stage are nearing the end of their career path. They are close to retiring, take on less work, and work at slower paces.

Studies from Canadian adjunct professor and psychology researcher Yani Likongo demonstrated that sometimes in organizations an idiosyncratic psychological contract is built between the employee and his direct supervisor in order to create an "informal deal" regarding work-life balance. These "deals" support the idea of a constructivist approach including both the employer and the employee, based on a give-and-take situation for both of them. Similarities are drawn between the psychological contract and social exchange theory in that the relationship's worth is defined through a cost-benefit analysis. The employee's attitude toward changes in the company which lead to changes in the psychological contract . An employee's attitude toward change in the job is directly linked to the employee's psychological contract with the manager or employer. An employee's attitude and mindset about what changes could benefit them in what ways could affect the psychological contract they have with the manager.

If managed effectively, the relationship will foster mutual trust between the parties, matching the objectives and commitments of the organization to those of their employees. But a negative psychological contract can result in employees becoming disenchanted, demotivated and resentful of authoritarianism within the organization. This will result in an increasingly inefficient workforce whose objectives no longer correspond to the organization they work for. The main cause of disappointment tends to be that middle managers are protective of their status and security in the eyes of their superiors, and this can introduce conflicts of interest when they are required to fulfill their obligations to their subordinates.

== Breach ==
Psychological contracts are largely reliant on promises between the employer and employee being kept, with trust being the basis for the social exchange. A breach in the psychological contract occurs if employees perceive that their firm, or its agents, have failed to deliver on what they perceive was promised, or vice versa. Employees or employers who perceive a breach are likely to respond negatively as it may oftentimes result in an immediate response of mistrust from the other side. Responses may occur in the form of reduced loyalty, commitment, and organizational citizenship behaviors. These feelings typically increase negative tension in the environment. Perceptions that one's psychological contract has been breached may arise shortly after the employee joins the company or even after years of satisfactory service. A breach in the contract may occur when the organizational changes are not necessarily beneficial for employees because of extenuating factors such as globalization and fast-changing markets. The impact may be localized and contained, but if morale is more generally affected, the performance of the organization may be diminished. The risk for breach may be reduced when the organization knows and respects the contracts of the employees. Further, if the activities of the organization are perceived as being unjust or immoral, e.g. aggressive downsizing or outsourcing causing significant unemployment, its public reputation and brand image may also be damaged.

== Psychological contracts in teams ==
Psychological contracts have also been theorized to occur within teams of individuals as they share everyday experiences, are subject to similar team-level promises, and interact collectively with other organizational agents. Based on the macrosociological perspective of social exchange theory as well as theories on the role of social influence in psychological contract evaluations, shared psychological contract fulfilment (PCF) shapes the relationship between individual PCF and outcomes, as well as facilitate the emergence of specific team states. Team-level PCF has been associated with higher levels of team engagement, lower average turnover intention, and higher and more positive affective climates. This line of research has suggested that organizations do not exclusively develop psychological contracts with individuals but also with groups or teams as entities that develop exchanges with an organization as a whole. This idea was also developed by Denise Rousseau when she described the notion of "normative contracts" in her seminal 1995 book.

== Bibliography ==
- Conway, Neil & Briner, Rob B. (2005). Understanding Psychological Contracts at Work: A Critical Evaluation of Theory and Research. Oxford, UK: Oxford University Press.
- Cullinane, Niall and Dundon, Tony (2006). "The psychological contract: a critical review", International Journal of Management Reviews, 8(2): 113–129.
- Guest, David E. (1998). "Is the psychological contract worth taking seriously?" Journal of Organizational Behavior, 19: 649–664.
- Laulié, L., & Tekleab, A. G. (2016). A multi-level theory of psychological contract fulfillment in teams. Group & Organization Management, 41(5), 658–698.
- Laulié, L., Tekleab, A. G., & Rousseau, D. M. (2023). Psychological contracts at different levels: The cross-level and comparative multilevel effects of team psychological contract fulfillment. Group & Organization Management, 10596011231203365.
- Laulié, L., & Escaffi-Schwarz, M. (2024). Emergence in context: How team-client psychological contract fulfillment is associated with the emergence of team identification or team-member exchange. Journal of Applied Psychology.
- Lester, Scott W; Kickul, Jill (2001). "Psychological contracts in the 21st century: What employees value most and how well organizations are responding to these expectations". Human Resource Planning, 24(1): 10.
- Rousseau, Denise M. (1995). Psychological Contracts in Organizations: Understanding Written and Unwritten Agreements. Thousand Oaks, CA: Sage.
- Tekleab, A. G., Laulié, L., De Vos, A., De Jong, J. P., & Coyle-Shapiro, J. A. (2020). Contextualizing psychological contracts research: A multi-sample study of shared individual psychological contract fulfilment. European Journal of Work and Organizational Psychology, 29(2), 279–293.
