= Quasar (brand) =

American electronics brand

Quasar Company
- Industry: Electronics
- Founded: 1967
- Key people: Bob Greenberg CEO; Alex Stone CEO; F. Jack Pluckhan CEO
- Products: Televisions, VCRs, record players, cassette players, air conditioners, Palmcorders, and microwave ovens
- Parent: Panasonic Corporation

Quasar was an American brand of electronics, first used by Motorola in 1967 for a model line of transistorized color televisions. These TVs were marketed as containing all serviceable parts in a drawer beside the picture tube. It was then established as a subsidiary brand, with all Motorola-manufactured televisions being sold as Quasar by Motorola. In 1974, Motorola sold its television business to Matsushita Electric, now Panasonic, which continued producing and marketing televisions under the Quasar brand until 2005. In 2013, Panasonic re-registered the Quasar trademark.

== History ==
Quasar was established as a television brand in 1967 by Motorola, who wanted to emphasize the simplified design of their all-transistor television sets; the chassis was designed in such a way that the electronic components were contained within a drawer that could be slid out by a technician for easy replacement or repair.

On May 28, 1974, Motorola sold its television manufacturing division—including its plants in Pontiac, Illinois; Franklin Park, Illinois; and Markham, Ontario—to Matsushita for approximately $108 million. Production of home television receivers continued under a newly incorporated entity, Quasar Electronics, Inc., an American-managed subsidiary of Matsushita Electronic Corporation of America (MECA). Motorola continued to operate a plant in Quincy, Illinois, until 1976, when this also was transferred to Matsushita. In the late 1970s, Quasar Company was established as a sales operation, with Quasar Electronics, Inc., manufacturing both televisions and microwave ovens in Franklin Park, Illinois. In 1981, improved production operations at this plant were praised by the media and management specialists, and quality control employees noted that they rarely were required to repair manufacturing defects, which had been a problem previously. The Franklin Park plant and Matsushita's management and manufacturing processes were discussed in Theory Z, a book by University of California, Los Angeles management professor William Ouchi.

In 1999, the Quasar brand was revived to serve as low-priced models of home electronics for Costco Wholesale stores, with the VHQ-940 VHS VCR model being the #1 best-selling VCR in America during the 1999 Christmas holiday shopping season. Then, VHQ-40M and VHQ-41M as successors for the next three years. Quasar's brand recognition and sales peaked by 2000–2001 and has declined ever since. By 2004, Quasar Electronics, Inc. and Quasar Company ceased to exist, after declining demand for VCRs and CRT televisions caused Costco to end the sales agreement.

After Costco ceased selling Quasar-branded electronics, the name was little used in North America, typically affixed to a few discontinued products from the Panasonic line being offered as closeout value products in drug stores and supermarkets. The trademark expired in 2007, by which time it was only being used on window air conditioners. In 2013, Panasonic re-registered the Quasar trademark to be used on a wide variety of electronics.

== In the media ==
According to a 1992 episode of the PBS investigative documentary program Frontline, entitled "Coming from Japan", Matsushita's acquisition of Motorola's Consumer Division was the beginning of the downfall of the U.S. TV industry. Frontline stated that Matsushita's acquisition was a ruse intended to allow Japanese-made sets, and sets assembled of Japanese parts, to avoid tariffs, with products under the Quasar brand still considered "domestically made", although Quasar's U.S.-based engineering, management and manufacturing division was slowly being liquidated. Some of the American management who transitioned to Matsushita's Quasar after the acquisition said that they were laid off en masse; they filed a discrimination lawsuit afterwards. The lawsuit was initially victorious, but overturned on appeal in 1991 when the Seventh Circuit Federal Appeals Court ruled that Matsushita's decision to treat executives differently based on citizenship rather than national origin was not legally discrimination.

== In Brazil ==
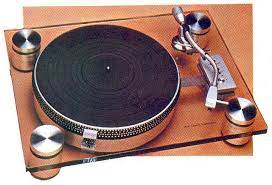
Float Quartz Transcriptor Pi-One

There was a company called "Quasar" in Brazil, this company apparently has no connection with the original company. This company operates from 1960 to 1982.

This company used the Quasar Logo described here at the end of its existence. Apparently this company was genuine as it was founded in 1960. This company manufactured receivers, amplifiers, turntables, equalizers, among others. One turntable of the company was displayed on the MOMA, the "Float Quartz Transcriptor Pi-One". Only 21 units were made.

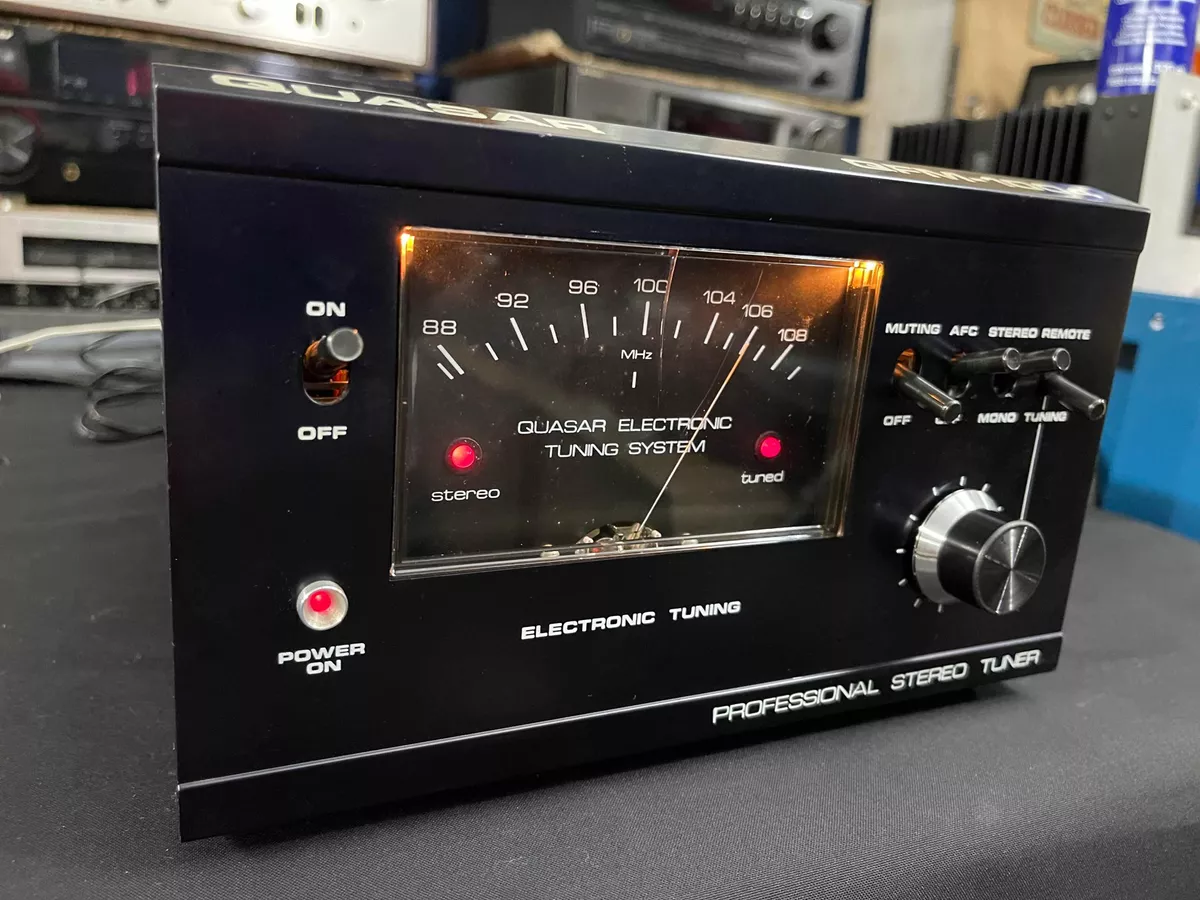
Quasar QFM 1400 Tuner

The company stood out because exclusive devices, like the QFM1400, a tuner with a "vu meter" style tuning dial.

The products were of high quality, with all electronic components being tested before being used in assembly and manufacturing.

== See also ==
- Quasar Franklin Park plant, a manufacturing plant in Franklin Park, Illinois
