= Quasar Franklin Park plant =

- Built: 1953
- Operated: 1953–1995
- Location: 9401 West Grand Avenue; Franklin Park, Illinois, United States
- Coordinates: 41°55′42″N 87°51′41″W
- Industry: Electronics
- Products: televisions
- Employees: 1,500
- Area: 18 acres (7.3 ha)
- Volume: 750,000 square feet (70,000 m^{2})
- Owner: Matsushita

Quasar Franklin Park plant was a Quasar television manufacturing plant in Franklin Park, Illinois, owned by Matsushita. The facility was closed in 1994.

== History ==
The plant was opened in September 1953 as a 278,000-square-foot Motorola television assembly plant to produce television sets.

In 1960, Motorola moved its corporate administrative headquarters to a newly completed administration building attached to its Franklin Park plant, which served as the company's base of operations until 1976, when executive offices relocated to Schaumburg, Illinois. In 1967, the factory launched the famous "Works in a Drawer" Quasar television line.

On May 28, 1974, Motorola sold its television manufacturing division, including its Franklin Park, Illinois, television manufacturing plant, to Matsushita Electric for approximately $108 million. Later, the plant began producing Panasonic-brand televisions in the same year alongside continued Quasar TV production.

In the late 1970s, Quasar Company was established as a sales operation, with Quasar Electronics, Inc. (established in 1974), manufacturing both televisions and microwave ovens in Franklin Park, Illinois. In 1981, improved production operations at this plant were praised by the media and management specialists, and quality control employees noted that they rarely were required to repair manufacturing defects, which had been a problem previously.

In early 1986, the plant began assembling color television sets for General Electric following the late 1985 phase-out of production at its Portsmouth, Virginia, manufacturing plant. In early 1987, Matsushita and GE chose not to renew their production agreement, with GE television production shifting to an RCA plant in Bloomington, Indiana, leading Matsushita to adjust operations and trim local staff at the Franklin Park facility.

In July 1994, Panasonic announced it will close the Franklin Park, Illinois, Quasar television manufacturing plant by early 1995, and will lay off 330 employees at the plant, shifting production to Tijuana, Mexico because of the NAFTA.

In January 1998, Matsushita sold the vacant Franklin Park plant to Imperial Realty Company. The site was later acquired by Digital Realty Trust in 2016, and was demolished in 2017 to build a data center.

== Legacy ==
The Franklin Park plant and Matsushita's management and manufacturing processes were discussed in Theory Z, a book by University of California, Los Angeles management professor William Ouchi.
