= William James Reddin =

British academic (1930–1999)

William James Reddin also known as Bill Reddin (May 10, 1930 – June 20, 1999) was a British-born management behavioralist, theorist, writer, and consultant. His published works examined and explained how managers in profit and non-profit organizations behaved under certain situations and conditions. The focus of his work was to understand to what extent managers were effective in their role and successful in managing situations to have the right impact on the organization's objectives.

Through extensive research Reddin concluded that there is no ideal management style. He put forward that there was only one realistic and unambiguous definition of managerial effectiveness, the extent to which a manager or leader achieves the output requirements of the position. This is the manager's or leader's only job: to be effective.

Reddin was often quoted as saying both in his writings, to his clients and to his students, that there is no ideal style of managing; and there is no one way to make an organization more effective. He wrote in his 1988 book, The Output Oriented Manager, "… no list exists in the world showing characteristics of effective managers, or, of effective organizations, which apply generally. He went on to write that his works' intent were to serve as a substitute for prescriptive management-guru advice prevalent in modern business, to enable the manager and leader in diagnosing what is the true situation and what are the true needs. They served managers and leaders to make sound decisions on how best to arrive at their planned objectives. This concept of managerial effectiveness is the central issue of Reddin's research, teachings, writings, diagnostic material and in his consulting and training.

Reddin advanced a theory to explain a critical and fundamental aspect of organizational success. He called it the 3D Theory.

This theory was contrary to popular management-belief at the time. Where Bill Reddin maintained that managerial effectiveness is defined in terms of output rather than input, meaning what they achieve rather than what they do, his colleagues in behavioralist studies and human psychology held that there were indeed ideal styles of management behavior.

== Personal life and foundations of his philosophy ==
Bill Reddin was born in 1930 to a working-class family with a variety music hall background. Due to the war years, the early part being an evacuee then the loss of the family home during an air raid, he experienced many schools in several different towns.

At the age of 14+ he left school and took up a position in a local factory as opportunities to continue his education were not an option at that time.

In December 1947 after much family consultation he emigrated to Canada. For 5 years he lived with one of his sister's, who married a Canadian, and her family in Fredericton, New Brunswick. He held various jobs during this time from street sweeping to a lab assistant until he joined the Canadian army as a radio operator - signal man.

While in the army he completed high school through correspondence courses. In 1950 he entered the University of New Brunswick at the age of 20. He graduated with honors holding a dual major in economics and in psychology.

During these years in university he continued working odd jobs saving enough money to attend Harvard Business School. While at Harvard, his thinking about the impact of management on a society of people, and the social responsibility of organizations began to form.

He took exception that certain subjects like ethics were not part of the course offerings nor part of the curriculum's dialogue. He had a visceral reaction against what he called the crown prince mentality and the emphasis on winners over losers. In his two years at Harvard Business School he was dismayed that they were assigned only one book on exploring organization and people which was Carl Roger's Counseling and Psychotherapy. Beyond that we received no advice, no lectures and three cases to talk about each day!" he later wrote. Out of this expertise came his thinking around compassionate management, akin to a do unto others approach. He wrote that it is important to consider the enterprise not only as a technical or administrative system but also a human system.

In subsequent years he encouraged his own students to be widely read not just on business, management and behavior, but the works of such authors as St Ignatius of Loyola's Spiritual Exercises, and The Rule of St Benedict, both of which are works on military history and strategy. These writers, he contended, had unique and humane insights to management where the object is not just getting results, but that the result is done right for the good of society at large.

Reddin received a Sloan Doctoral Fellowship from the MIT Sloan School of Management following graduation from Harvard. It was at MIT that he began to evolve his theories on managerial effectiveness interwoven with the responsibility of an organization's impact on society or the social system it served.

In his seminal article, Any Manager's Responsibility he explained his thinking in the opening paragraph:

Managers should be effective. This means delivering on what their job really is and creating conditions so that subordinates may also become effective.
Well-designed organizations are quiet places in which to work and they are effective. Poorly-designed organizations lead to heart attacks and ulcers. Work and play are not very different.
Managerial effectiveness can be defined and measured. It is a useful idea any manager can embrace. It is not personality, but performance.
The manager in society is solely responsible for creating wealth by combining resources in new and useful ways. If managers are not effective the country is less competitive and old age pensions smaller.
The price of low effectiveness is minimum wages, premature retirement and closed-down works.

In 1965, Reddin joined the faculty of the University of New Brunswick Business School. For the next 17 years he established himself as a leading academic, thinker, writer and consultant on management. His home in Fredericton served as a forum for students and scholars to discuss ideas and issues governing management and organizations. When he travelled for work he left a key on the door ledge for students to let themselves in to browse among his over 30,000 volumes in his library. This library served as a sort commons rooms for students and thinkers alike. Reddin was a chef as well as wine connoisseur and students found themselves debating the concept of Reddin's 3D Theory, and Management by Objectives (MbO) over gourmet wines and dinners.

In 1974, he left the world of academia, to apply his action-oriented work into practice and founded a management consultancy practice and expanded to over 25 countries. Today, Reddin Assessments. has served over 3,000 clients worldwide and train more than 500,000 managers over the world. Over the past 45 years his clients included Fortune 500 and other global multinationals including Kodak, Westinghouse, Ford, Siemens, Westpac and Martin Marietta, Santander, Boehringer Ingelheim, AstraZeneca, Novartis and many many more. Bill died peacefully in 1999 in London and twenty years after his death, his company is still alive.

== The 3D Theory ==
Reddin's research published in his 1983 PhD thesis, Managerial Effectiveness and Style: Individual or Situation indicated that the notion of a single ideal management style was not sound nor useful. He recognized that it was a manager's effectiveness as key to an organization's success. He maintained that managerial styles are best understood in relation to specific situations, to the effectiveness it had on advancing the goals and success of an organization.

"Any managerial style has a situation appropriate to it, and many situations inappropriate to it…", Reddin wrote in his book that explains his theories and models, called Managerial Effectiveness published in 1984. "…The added third dimension could be labeled appropriateness of style to situation" or, effectiveness—in having the right impact.

"The 3D Theory" essentially is a framework emphasizing concepts and relationships rather than descriptions. It was designed to serve as a practical tool for managers and team leaders showing effectiveness as a central value. At the heart of the 3D Theory there is a simple idea, he wrote, which he discovered through a long series of research studies, and in close collaboration with key thinkers and teachers and writers on organizational development and psychology.

Psychologists worked out that there were two main elements in managerial behavior which concerned the task to be done and the relationships with other people. They also recognized that managers or team leaders sometimes emphasized one, and sometimes emphasized the other, and that these two elements of behavior could be used in small or in large amounts. A manager could be more task oriented (dedicated managerial style) at times, or relationship oriented (related managerial style), use less task oriented and relationship orientation to manage the team (separated managerial style) or both behaviors could be used together (integrated managerial style).

These four basic styles represent four types of managerial behavior. Reddin was clear that not all types of managerial behavior fit cleanly into these four types, but served as the general framework for his 3D Theory. Since no one managerial style is always effective, and his research showed that any of these four basic styles could be effective in certain situations and not effective in others. The effectiveness was contingent on the situation in which they are applied. Effectiveness is the third dimension—each one of the four basic styles has a less effective equivalent and a more effective equivalent. Therefore, these 8 managerial styles are not 8 additional kinds of management behavior. These are the names given to the four basic style when used effectively or appropriately, or less effectively. The dimensionality of effectiveness comes into play along the x/y axis of Task Orientation (TO) and Relationship Orientation (RO).

Basic Style	Less Effective Managerial Style	More Effective Managerial Style
Separated	Deserter	Bureaucrat
Related	Missionary	Developer
Dedicated	Autocrat	Benevolent Autocrat
Integrated	Compromiser	Executive

He understood that managerial styles themselves represent fairly wide ranges of behavior. And, that managerial styles could not be defined solely with reference to effectiveness as behavior. Included in his model of the 3D Theory are two key concepts of flexibility and rigidity—to the extent which a manager or leader is versatile in managing their style for the right impact.

Reddin developed a methodology to support his research and teachings. He created diagnostic and testing material to solidify the concept of the dimensions of managerial effectiveness. He reinforced this material with a series of training modules applied to a wide variety of organizations across geographies and cultures. He called this "3D Managerial Effectiveness". Once an assessment has been made of managerial style, this followed clear considerations to plainly indicate managerial effectiveness: mastery of task orientation and relationship orientation, and the demand of the situation in which it is applied.

Reddin's work and that of his writing and research fused his foundational theory that it is every manager's job to make the organization more effective ensuring the right results are generated.

== Influences ==
Bill Reddin frequently referred to himself as an occupational sociologist, concerned with people and their work effectiveness. He was steeped in the thinking and research of many of his predecessors and contemporaries in organizational behavior. He was drawn to the thinking, writing and work of number of critical colleagues and teachers who in turn influenced his understanding of people and organizations. Among these are Peter Drucker, Douglas McGregor, and Kurt Lewin.

=== Peter Drucker ===
Bill Reddin's Model of Managerial Effectiveness is a practical application of Peter Drucker's (1909–2005) theories of Management by Objectives. Drucker coined the concept of knowledge workers and the overarching emphasis on effectiveness especially among the executive strata of an organization by being objective oriented.

"Efficiency is doing things right," Drucker wrote in The Effective Executive, stressing that "Effectiveness is doing the right things." What's true for individual managers is also true for organizations, which often squander time and resources trying to improve processes for products not worth producing.

Drucker put forward that effectiveness in leadership is learned, "To be effective is the job of the executive… whether he works in a business or in a hospital, in a government agency or in a labor union, in a university or in the army, the executive is, first of all, expected to get the right things done."

In Drucker's 1954 book The Practice of Management Drucker introduced the ideas around Management by Objectives. A perceptive observer of behavior, Drucker recognized that in the daily churn of work, employees become so focused on the job at-hand they forget why they're doing it. Drucker called this "the activity trap" and proposed Management by Objectives as a way to avoid it.

"Objectives are needed in every area where performance and results directly and vitally affect the survival and prosperity of the business, wrote Drucker, and the first requirement, he continues, … in managing managers is by objectives…" With MbO, employees participate in establishing and setting goals with performance evaluations stemming on how they fulfill those goals. In this way, managers can focus on the "what" rather than the "how." "Management by Objective works--if you know the objective," Drucker wrote, however, he also concluded that "Ninety percent of the time you don't."

Reddin put forward that effectiveness of knowledge workers can be measured by looking at the position held by the manager and the demanded impact of that role: what outputs are required. Both the idea of effectiveness, and its demand expectations and measuring outputs influenced Reddin's thinking and publications specifically in Effective Management by Objectives, Managerial Effectiveness, and the training material and diagnostic tests that he developed. He too maintained that, fundamentally, effectiveness needs to be trained.

Out of this thinking came Reddin's 3D Theory, followed by his books The Output Oriented Manager and The Output Oriented Organization.

Most importantly, from Drucker's demand that objectives be measured, Reddin developed a model and methodology that evolved Drucker's work to the extent that MbO and effectiveness can be taught, delivered, clearly measured for the right impact to managers and organization-wide.

Where Drucker's work was applied one-to-one, Reddin operationalized Drucker's practice to execute the model on a one-to-many basis.

=== Douglas McGregor ===
His influence on Reddin is through McGregor's work on the basic conflict between the needs of the worker and the needs of the organization.

Douglas McGregor (1906–1964) was a professor at the MIT Sloan School of Management and President of Antioch College from 1948 to 1954. In the early 1960s McGregor described two very different views towards workforce motivation. He maintained that companies followed either one or the other approach as discussed in his book, The Human Side of Enterprise describing the traditional view of people at work in terms of Theory X, and a more contemporary attitude towards employee defined in terms of Theory Y. These two theories make the following assumptions: Theory X and theory Y

In Theory X people are essentially lazy, not ambitious, and have little capacity and creativity for problem solving. Motivation is on the basis of physiological and security and people need to be closely controlled and coerced to work.
Theory Y puts forward that workers are motivated by higher order needs and tend towards self-control and self-direction. People have the capacity to problem-solve, are motivated by affiliation, esteem and the possibility of self-actualization besides physiological and security needs.
Theory Y managers likely cultivate a climate of trust with employees, an essential requirement for successful organizational and human resource development. Developing a climate of trust includes managers communicating openly with subordinates, minimizing differences between superior-subordinate relationships, refining an environment that allows subordinates to thrive and possibly realize their potential.

This trusting climate is one that fosters input to decision-making so that subordinates have buy in to commitments that influence them. In this, Theory Y is a positive view towards the human resources of an organization.

McGregor delineates these two distinct managerial styles as extreme to make a clear argument. In order to integrate an organization with individual needs there must be an ideal type class. In effect, he proposed that one type of management is better than other.

Through this, Reddin advances towards another theory, Theory Z put forward by Abraham Maslow in his paper on Theory Z in 1970. Reddin's 3D Theory is based in part on these three views of man, but it is the rational situationist view of man to which Reddin holds:

Man has a will. He is open to good and evil. Situation drives man. Reason motivates man. Interdependence is man's basic mode of interaction. Interaction is man's social unit of importance. Objective best and succinctly describes man's view of man.

Reddin often discussed this point of view, usually in context of why MbO most often fails. He believed that it was a matter of commitment to objectives, by creating objectives that motivates and engages an individual. They must be grounded in reality. There must be an appropriate amount of participation for the given situation. This empowers managers to be effective.

=== Kurt Lewin ===
Reddin designed and developed the diagnostic material and training elements to improve managerial effectiveness in the 3D Managerial Effectiveness Seminar also referred to as Unfreezing. The basis of this seminar stems from the research findings of Kurt Lewin (1890–1947).

Lewin was a psychologist, recognized as one of the modern pioneers of social, organizational and applied psychology. He was one of the first to study and write about group dynamics and organizational development. Of his many accomplishments and significant positions he held over his lifetime, he served as director of the Center for Group Dynamics at MIT where Reddin eventually did his post fellowship. Group dynamics, or the phrase group process is about exploring the behavior of people in groups, such as task-oriented groups, that are trying to problem-solve or make a decision.

While working at MIT in 1946, Lewin examined issues governing prejudices and set up a workshop to conduct a 'change' experiment. This laid the foundation for what was later known as sensitivity training. It led to the establishment of the National Training Laboratories (NTL) in Bethel, Maine in 1947.

For Reddin, the Group Dynamics School held keen interest in its exploration of the interaction among people, the emphasis on the informal organization, lowering the power differential between the superior and the subordinate and the rich thinking that emanates from working in groups rather than individual dynamics. Reddin wrote extensively about situational sensitivity as one of the critical elements of managerial effectiveness in his 3D Theory. This also ties into his affiliation with Theory Z as well as recognizing the dimensions of Theory Y managers.

Lewin's studies and work on leadership climates, and, on the change process also deeply influenced Reddin's research and future writings, training and development of his diagnostic material on effectiveness. Broadly, in Reddin's book, The Output Oriented Organization, it was designed around Lewin's work on change in the social systems and the ability to understand it the same way as physical change. This is seen in Lewin's research in unfreezing.

Lewin's early model of change was described it in terms of a three-stage process, and served as a corner piece to Reddin's work on helping managers and leaders become effective. In Lewin's change model he called the first stage unfreezing involving overcoming inertia and dismantling an existing mind-set. He saw this mind-set as a defense mechanism that needed to be circumvented. Change occurs at the second stage — this is a period wrought with confusion as the individual transitions from a previous mind-set to a new way of looking at and thinking of things. Their frame of reference is being challenged and clarity as to what is replacing it has yet to materialize.

The final stage is when the individual understands clearly what needs to change and establishing a comfort level going forward forming a new mind-set. Reddin explains his synthesis of Lewin's research in the preface of The Output Oriented Organization:

…if you want to change a block of ice, you first unfreeze it, then you change it, and, finally, stabilizing the new shape. So that in new organization unfreezing is necessary. This may simply consist of questioning the past; some kind of change is needed and this is best accomplished by talking about the right things, with a shared interest in effectiveness. Something must be done to stabilize change and this may range all the way from improved corporate strategy to reorganization to new systems, or on to new policies and operating methods in general.

== Concepts ==
Two concepts are at the heart of Reddin's work: effectiveness and objectives synthesized as follows:

=== Effectiveness ===
- Output orientation should be linked directly to organization philosophy, induction training and organization development (OD). In this way, it becomes the firm's central value induced by training and OD.
- Effectiveness areas should be the basis of describing jobs and of linking one job to another - i.e. system design.
- Measurement areas form the basis of job specifications in determining what kind of manager is required.
- In manager selection: is this the person we want? In training plans: how do we obtain desired behavior?
- And in job evaluation: how much should we pay?

=== Objectives ===
Objectives form the basis of the link between corporate strategy and managerial appraisal.

To make the concept of output orientation operational for an organization, it must be linked with objectives. This is easily done by use of the following (linked) ideas:

1. Managerial Effectiveness: the extent to which a manager achieves the output requirements of the position.
2. Effectiveness Areas: general output requirements of the managerial position.
3. Measurement Areas: the way in which an effectiveness area is measured.
4. Authority Areas: effectiveness areas must be matched with the authority to achieve the objectives based on the effectiveness areas.
5. Objectives: output requirements which are as specific, time bounded and as measurable as possible.

While the concept of objectives is central in output orientation, the other four ideas (managerial effectiveness, effectiveness areas, measurement areas and authority areas) are the foundations of any objectives that are set; and only with an understanding of these will the objectives be sound.

== Author and Main Works ==
William James Reddin died June 20, 1999, in London of natural causes at the age of 69. His work and thinking continues to be especially popular in Europe, Latin America, and Canada. Reddin's 23 books have been translated into 12 languages.

- 1970: Managerial Effectiveness, McGraw-Hill, New York
- 1971: Effective MBO, McGraw-Hill, NY
- 1974: Management By Objectives for Irish Managers, with P. Kehoe, Mount Salus Press Ltd, Dublin.
- 1983: Management Effectiveness & Style – Individual or Situation, PhD Thesis.
- 1985: The Best of Bill Reddin, Institute of Personnel Management
- 1987: Effective Management, Tata McGraw-Hill
- 1987: How to Make Your Management Style More Effective, McGraw-Hill
- 1988: Handbook of Management By Objectives, with D. Ryan, Tata McGraw-Hill
- 1988: Managerial Styles Made Effective, Tata McGraw-Hill
- 1989: The Output Oriented Manager, Grower Publishing Company
- 1989: The Output Oriented Organization, Grower Publishing Company.
- 1989: The Smart Manager's Book of Lists, Lake Publishing Company
- 1990: Managing By Outputs, Tata McGraw-Hill
- 1990: Tests for the Output Oriented Manager, Korgan-Page

He designed and authored over 40 management diagnostic tests, training material, workbooks to support his model and methodology in an applied way within organizations including:

- 1967: Effectiveness Areas
- 1984: Managerial Effectiveness Diagnosis

He wrote books on finance and savings as well as a contributing author to a number of books including:

- 1964: Successful Spending, Saving and Investing, McGraw-Hill, Toronto.
- 1965: Problems in economic and business statistics for Canadian students. 1967: Campus Countdown, McGraw-Hill, Toronto.
- 1971: Problems in Business Statistics, (1st edition in 1968 and 2nd edition in 1971) with R. Lim, Tribune, Sackville.
- 1972: The Money Book, Scribners, NY
- 1974: Money Management, with Robin Stuart-Kotze, McGraw-Hill, Toronto
