= Perceived psychological contract violation =

Belief that one's employer has broken promises

Perceived psychological contract violation (PPCV) is a construct that regards employees’ feelings of disappointment (ranging from minor frustration to betrayal) arising from their belief that their organization has broken its psychological contract of work-related promises, and is generally thought to be the organization's contribution to a negative reciprocity dynamic, as employees tend to perform more poorly to pay back PPCV.

== Differentiation from perceived organizational support ==
Both PPCV and perceived organizational support (POS) are based on the norm of reciprocity. Both POS and PPCV are types of social exchanges and therefore involve implicit obligations, rather than economic exchanges, which involve explicit obligations. Perceived organizational support is focused on favorable treatment and the degree to which employees engage in positive reciprocity with the organization, whereas PPCV is focused on unfavorable treatment and the degree to which employees engage in negative reciprocity with the organization.

== Recent research ==
David R. Hekman and colleagues in 2009 found that professional employees (e.g. doctors, nurses, lawyers) were less likely to reciprocate PPCV when they strongly identified with the organization and weakly identified with the profession. Such workers' organizational identification and professional identification combined to alter the influence of PPCV on performance behaviors. The results suggested that PPCV had the most negative influence on professional employees' work performance when employees strongly identified with the profession and weakly identified with the organization.

== Measurement items ==
PPCV is typically measured with the four-item PPCV scale developed by Robinson & Morrison in 2000. This scale has been recommended by Freese and Chalk (2008) in their critical criteria-based reviews of all the different measures of the psychological contract. Respondents are asked to indicate the extent to which they agree with the following statements on a seven-point scale.

1. I feel a great deal of anger toward my organization.
2. I feel betrayed by my organization.
3. I feel that my organization has violated the contract between us.
4. I feel extremely frustrated by how I have been treated by my organization.

These "contract breach" items are less commonly used:

1. Almost all the promises made by my organization during my recruitment have been kept so far.
2. I feel that my organization has come through in fulfilling the promises made to me when I was hired.
3. So far my organization has done an excellent job of fulfilling its promises to me.
4. I have not received everything promised to me in exchange for my contributions.
5. My organization has broken many of its promises to me even though I've upheld my side of the deal.

== See also ==
- Emotional exhaustion
- Misplaced loyalty
- Stress
