= Misplaced loyalty =

Loyalty placed where it is not respected or to an unworthy cause

Misplaced loyalty (or mistaken loyalty, misguided loyalty or misplaced trust) is loyalty placed in other persons or organisations where that loyalty is not acknowledged, is not respected, is betrayed, or is taken advantage of. It can also mean loyalty to a malignant or misguided cause.

Social psychology provides a partial explanation for the phenomenon in the way that the norm of social reciprocity motivates people to honor their agreements, and shows that people usually maintain an agreed deal even when it changes for the worse. Humanists point out that "[M]an inherits the capacity for loyalty, but not the use to which he shall put it [...] may unselfishly devote himself to what is petty or vile, as he may to what is generous and noble".

== In the family ==
Part of the conventional therapeutic wisdom is 'that those of us who were unlucky enough to be raised by bad parents also get to be burdened as adults by their demands...we maintain a sense of misguided loyalty'. Under the rubric - 'Misplaced Loyalty: The Codependency Factor' - the self-help movement would strongly challenge such loyalty: 'in either individual therapy or self-help groups, the goal is to seek out and replace our misguided loyalty and attachment to our failed parents with attachment to healthier peers'.

Psychoanalysis would highlight the accompanying paradox that 'the child, it should be remembered, always defends the bad parent more ferociously than the good'. The paradox may help account for what have been called 'trauma bonds...the misplaced loyalties found in exploitive cults, incest families, or hostage and kidnapping situations, or codependents who live with alcoholics, compulsive gamblers or sex addicts'.

== Institutional ==
'Institutions develop powerful instruments of defence for their protection and perpetuation...develop misguided loyalty to committee and boards. To criticize forcibly rather than to cover up is to rock the boat'. Similarly, there are 'examples where misguided loyalty on the part of a business owner or manager has led to a decline in a business's performance'.

Sometimes, however, institutions are torn by conflicting codes of loyalty. Thus in the police, in-force loyalty, which 'has sometimes caused officers to lie and cheat on behalf of others...is now regarded as misplaced loyalty': in partial palliation, 'it must be understood that this "looking after one's mates" is a critical element of loyalty for those who face combat'.

== In analytic controversy ==
The charge of misplaced loyalty is often used as a weapon in analytic disputes. Lacan for example criticised Ernest Kris for the way 'he accredits this interpretation to "ego psychology" à la Hartmann, whom he believed he was under some obligation to support'.

Similarly, Neville Symington's 'criticism of Melanie Klein is that...she maintained the concept of the death instinct in order to remain loyal to Freud's instinct theory, but it only muddles her otherwise clear formulations'.

== Historical ==
- 'The Spartans' behaviour at Thermopylae' might be seen as misplaced loyalty, or at least as 'an overriding commitment and loyalty to the good and the absolutely overriding dictates of the state' — as an instance when 'unreasoning obedience to a noble but narrow ideal received its logical reward'.
- It has been suggested that part of the military problems of the Confederacy came from the way the President, Jefferson Davis, 'had a propensity for meddling with commands and a strong but misplaced confidence in lesser men like...Braxton Bragg and Beauregard'.

== Literary ==
- "When my love swears that she is made of truth I do believe her, though I know she lies" Shakespeare's Sonnet 138.
- C. S. Lewis in his wartime novel That Hideous Strength had the following exchange: '"There's such a thing as loyalty", said Jane. McPhee...suddenly looked up with a hundred covenanters in his eyes. "There is, Ma'am", he said. "As you get older you will learn that it is a virtue too important to be lavished on individual personalities"'.
- On his last day in the C.I.D., John Rebus reflects guiltily that from his first day in the C.I.D. he had learnt that '"there's only two teams - us and them ... You covered for mates who'd had too many whiskies with lunch...or gone a bit too far on an arrest...prisoners falling downstairs or stumbling into walls...you covered for everybody on your team'.

== See also ==
- Authority bias – Cognitive bias
- Code of silence – Intentional withholding of information
- Omertà – Southern Italian code of honor and silence
- Perceived organizational support – Extent to which employees feel valued
- Perceived psychological contract violation – Belief that one's employer has broken promises
- Trust – Assumption of and reliance on the honesty of another party
- Whistleblower – Exposing of scandalous activity
- Stockholm syndrome – Contested psychological condition
