= Theory Z =

Various theories of human motivation

Theory Z is a name for various theories of human motivation built on Douglas McGregor's Theory X and Theory Y. Theories X, Y and various versions of Z have been used in human resource management, organizational behavior, organizational communication and organizational development.

McGregor's Theory X states that workers inherently dislike and avoid work and must be driven to it, in contrast to Theory Y which states that work is natural and can be a source of satisfaction when aimed at higher order human psychological needs.

One Theory Z was developed by Abraham H. Maslow in his paper "Theory Z", which was published in 1969 in the Journal of Transpersonal Psychology. A second theory is the 3D theory which was developed by W. J. Reddin in his book Managerial Effectiveness (1970), and a third theory is William Ouchi's so-called "Japanese management" style, which was explained in his book Theory Z: How American Business Can Meet the Japanese Challenge (1981) responding to the Asian economic boom of the 1980s.

For Ouchi, Theory Z focused on increasing employee loyalty to the company by providing a job for life with a strong focus on the well-being of the employee, both on and off the job. According to Ouchi, Theory Z management tends to promote stable employment, high productivity, and high employee morale and satisfaction.

== Pre-Theory Z ==
Abraham Maslow, a psychologist and pioneer in human motivation, developed a theory of motivation based upon human needs that had three assumptions. First, human needs are never completely satisfied. Second, human behavior is purposeful and motivated by a need for satisfaction. Third, these needs can be classified according to a hierarchical structure of importance from the lowest to highest (Maslow, 1954):

1. Physiological need
2. Safety needs
3. Belongingness and love needs
4. The esteem needs – self-confidence
5. The need for self-actualization – the need to reach your full potential

Maslow's hierarchy of needs theory helps the manager to understand what motivates an employee. By understanding what needs must be met in order for an employee to achieve the highest level of motivation, managers are then able to get the most out of production.

Theory X and Theory Y were both developed by Douglas McGregor, a social psychologist interested in the characteristics of successful organizations. McGregor's book, The Human Side of Enterprise (1960), described Theories X and Y based upon Maslow's original hierarchy of needs. McGregor grouped the hierarchy into a lower order (Theory X) needs and a higher-order (Theory Y) needs. He suggested that management may need to motivate employees, but better results could be gained by using Theory Y, rather than Theory X (Heil, Bennis, & Stephens, 2000).

== Maslow's Theory Z ==
Late in his career Maslow focused increasingly on self-transcendence as a human phenomenon and concern. As he explained in his seminal paper titled Theory Z, the motivation for transcendence literally 'transcends' his original hierarchy of needs. So, for example, some people who achieve self-actualization — the highest level of his original pyramid — also achieve a transcendent life orientation, while other self-actualizers do not. On the other hand, some people, like the proverbial "starving artist," value self-transcendence ahead of all material values, including self-actualization (in the sense of being materially "successful"). Hence, for Maslow transcendence is not so much an extension of his original pyramid as an orthogonal dimension.

Theory X, Y and Z all play a role in how a company should manage successfully. Maslow believed the ideal organization would harness the human drive for self-transcendence, as well as the motivations of his original pyramid.
