= Denise Rousseau =

American psychologist (born 1951)

- Born: October 20, 1951 (age 74)
- Education: University of California, Berkeley
- Occupation: Psychologist
- Known for: Psychological contract theory
- Spouse: Paul S. Goodman

Denise M. Rousseau (born 20 October 1951) is a professor at Carnegie Mellon University. She holds an H.J. Heinz II Chair in Organizational Behavior and Public Policy, Heinz College and jointly Tepper School of Business.

She was the 60th president of the Academy of Management.

== Education and career ==
She received an A.A. degree from Santa Rosa Junior College and undergraduate degrees with honors in Psychology and Anthropology from the University of California at Berkeley. She obtained her Ph.D. in psychology at the University of California at Berkeley and holds several honorary doctorates.

In 2007, she founded the Evidence-Based Management Collaborative to promote the development and dissemination of Evidence-based Management teaching and practice. Operating as the Center for Evidence-Based Management (Eric Barends, managing director), this Collaborative helps educators and practitioners make better use of evidence from science, data, stakeholders and experience in organizational decisions. Rousseau serves as CEBMa's Academic Chair. Barends and Rousseau are co-convenors of the Business and Management Group of the Campbell Library of Systematic Reviews.

Previously, Rousseau worked on the faculties of the University of Michigan in Psychology and Institute for Social Research, Naval Postgraduate School at Monterey, and Kellogg School of Management at Northwestern University. Rousseau also has held visiting appointments at Nanyang Technological University, Singapore; Leeds University, UK, Dublin City University, Ireland, and the University of New South Wales, Australia.

Rousseau's influences include Herb Simon and Stephen Laner.

Former Students include: Karl Aquino, Eric Barends, Guillermo Dabos, Violet Ho, Byeong Jo Kim, Lai Lei, Laurie Levesque, Gerard Beenen, Ranga Ranganujam, and Sandra Robinson.

She is a Fellow of the American Psychological Association, Society of Industrial-Organizational Psychology, Academy of Management, and British Academy of Management and an Academician of the Academy of Social Sciences.

== Work ==
=== Psychological contract theory ===
Rousseau developed the concept of a psychological contract in order to better specify how employers and employees understand the employment relationship. Psychological Contract Theory (PCT) also provides a basis for developing shared understandings in employment. It also addresses how to more effectively change the nature and terms of psychological contracts.

Rousseau's 1995 book Psychological Contract in Organizations: Understanding Written and Unwritten Agreements won the George Terry Book Award for best book in management from the Academy of Management.

=== Idiosyncratic deals ===
Rousseau's research identified the often hidden but widespread phenomenon of idiosyncratic deals, whereby individual employees bargain for employment arrangements different from their peers. Early research on the psychological contract identified an anomaly, the repeated observation that people working for the same firm and same boss can have distinctly different psychological contracts. Her 2005 book I-deals: Idiosyncratic Deals Employees Bargain for Themselves also won the George Terry Book Award for best book in management from the Academy of Management.

=== Evidence-Based Management ===
Rousseau is a proponent of Evidence-Based Management (EBM), a decision-making approach that emphasizes the use of the available evidence from multiple sources.

Rousseau defines EBM as the conscientious, explicit, and judicious use of evidence in making decisions about the management of organizations.

Rousseau is the founder of the Evidence-Based Management Collaborative, a network of scholars, consultants, and practitioners committed to promoting evidence-informed organizational decision-making.

Her influential book, Evidence-Based Management: How to Use Evidence to Make Better Organizational Decisions (co-authored with Eric Barends), has been widely adopted by over 80 universities.

== Personal life ==
Rousseau was married to fellow Carnegie Mellon professor and organizational psychologist Paul S. Goodman. They produced films together.

== Selected publications ==
=== Journals ===
- Jelley, R. Blake; Carroll, Wendy R.; Rousseau, Denise M. (2012-09-18), "Reflections on Teaching Evidence-Based Management", The Oxford Handbook of Evidence-Based Management, Oxford University Press, pp. 337–355, doi:10.1093/oxfordhb/9780199763986.013.0019, ISBN 978-0-19-976398-6
- Rousseau, Denise M.; Stouten, Jeroen (2025-01-21). "Experts and Expertise in Organizations: An Integrative Review on Individual Expertise". Annual Review of Organizational Psychology and Organizational Behavior. 12 (1): 159–184. doi:10.1146/annurev-orgpsych-020323-012717. ISSN 2327-0608.
- Rousseau, Denise M.; Hansen, Samantha D.; Tomprou, Maria (2018). "A dynamic phase model of psychological contract processes". Journal of Organizational Behavior. 39 (9): 1081–1098. doi:10.1002/job.2284. ISSN 1099-1379.

=== Books ===
- Roberts, Karlene H.; Hulin, Charles L.; Rousseau, Denise M. (1978). Developing an interdisciplinary science of organizations. Jossey-Bass. ISBN 978-0-87589-393-8.
- Rousseau, Denise; Ph.D, Professor of Organizational Behavior Denise M. Rousseau (1995-05-18). Psychological Contracts in Organizations: Understanding Written and Unwritten Agreements. SAGE. ISBN 978-0-8039-7105-9.
- The Boundaryless Career: A New Employment Principle for a New Organizational Era. Oxford, New York: Oxford University Press. 1996-09-05. ISBN 978-0-19-510014-3.
- Rousseau, Denise M.; Leana, Carrie R. (2000). Relational Wealth: The Advantages of Stability in a Changing Economy. Oxford University Press. ISBN 978-0-19-513447-6.
- Rousseau, Denise; Schalk, Rene; Schalk, Marinus Johannes Dominicus; Schalk, Ren (2000-05-17). Psychological Contracts in Employment: Cross-National Perspectives. SAGE. ISBN 978-0-7619-1681-9.
- USA), Denise (Carnegie Mellon University Rousseau; Rousseau, Denise M. (2005). I-deals, Idiosyncratic Deals Employees Bargain for Themselves. M.E. Sharpe. ISBN 978-0-7656-1042-3.
- Rousseau, Denise M. (2013-12-15). The Oxford Handbook of Evidence-Based Management. Oxford University Press. ISBN 978-0-19-936628-6.
- Rousseau, Denise M.; Rozario, Pascale De; Jardat, Rémi; Pesqueux, Yvon (2014-05-09). Contrat psychologique et organisations: Comprendre les accords écrits et non-écrits (in French). Pearson Education France. ISBN 978-2-326-00069-8.
- Bal, P. Matthijs; Kooij, Dorien T. A. M.; Rousseau, Denise M. (2014-09-23). Aging Workers and the Employee-Employer Relationship. Springer. ISBN 978-3-319-08007-9.
- Bal, Matthijs; Rousseau, Denise M. (2015-09-16). Idiosyncratic Deals between Employees and Organizations: Conceptual issues, applications and the role of co-workers. Routledge. ISBN 978-1-317-67555-6.
- Rousseau, Denise M. (2018). Evidence-based management: how to use evidence to make better organizational decisions. London; New York: Kogan Page Ltd. ISBN 978-0-7494-8374-6.

== Awards ==
- Phi Beta Kappa, University of California at Berkeley (1973)
- Society of Organization Behavior (Elected 1979)
- William J. Davis Memorial Award, Best Article, Educational Administration Quarterly (1982)
- National Institute for Health Care Management Research Award (1994)
- George R. Terry Award, Best Book in Management, Academy of Management (1996)
- Shaw Chair, Nanyang Technical University, Singapore (2000)
- Benedictine College, Recognition for Contribution to Organizational Development (2006)
- Mentored Case Award, CASE Association Conference (with L. Levesque and V. Ho, 2006)
- George R. Terry Award, Best Book in Management, Academy of Management (2006)
- JMI Scholar, Western Academy of Management (2007)
- Distinguished Scholar, Managerial and Organizational Cognition Division, Academy of Management (2006)
- Douglas McGregor Memorial Award from NTL for Best Paper in Journal of Applied Behavior Science (2006)
- Best Paper Award in Academy of Management Learning and Education (2008)
- Lifetime Achievement Award Organizational Behavior Division of Academy of Management (AOM) (2009)
- Distinguished Service Career Award, Academy of Management (2010)
- Honorary Doctorates from Athens University of Economics and Business (2013) and Tallinn University of Technology (2014)
- Lifetime Achievement Award, Israel Organizational Behavior Conference (2014)
- Elected, Academician, Academy of Social Sciences (UK - National Academy of Academics, Learned Societies and Practitioners in the Social Sciences (2014)
- Practice Impact Award, AOM Practice Theme Committee (2014)
- Mahoney AOM HR Division Mentoring Award (2015)
- Hughes Award for Career Scholarship, Academy of Management Careers Division (2016)
- Career Award for Lifetime Achievement Academy of Management Distinguished Scholarly Contributions to Management (2016)
- Michael Losey Career Award for Contributions to Scholarship and Practice, Society for Human Resource Management (2019)
- Distinguished Scholarship Career Award, Society for Industrial/Organizational Psychology (2020)
- Douglas McGregor Memorial Award from NTL for Best Article in Journal of Applied Behavioral Science in 2019 (2020)
- Co-winner, Benedictine University Scholar-Practitioner Collaboration Award Management Consulting Division, Academy of Management (2022)
- Best Paper Award, Psychological Contract Small Group Conference, Bordeaux (2023) with Lyo Laulie and Amanuel Tekleab
- Lifetime Scholarly Achievement Award, Organizational Development and Change Division, Academy of Management (2024)
