= Paul S. Goodman =

American organizational psychologist and filmmaker (1937–2012)

- Born: 1937
- Died: 2012 (aged 74–75); Pittsburgh, Pennsylvania, USA
- Occupations: Psychologist, researcher, author, filmmaker

Paul S. Goodman (1937–2012) was an organizational psychologist, author, and filmmaker. He was the Richard M. Cyert Professor of Organizational Psychology at Carnegie Mellon University's Tepper School of Business.

== Early life and career ==
Paul S. Goodman was born in 1937 in Cambridge, Massachusetts. He graduated from Trinity College (Connecticut), where he received a Bachelor of Arts degree in economics in 1959, from Dartmouth College, where he received a Master of Business Administration degree in 1961, and from Cornell University, where he received a Doctor of Philosophy in organizational psychology in 1966. He later joined the Carnegie Mellon University Tepper School of Business where he became the Richard M. Cyert Professor of Organizational Psychology.

At Carnegie Mellon, he became the director of the Institute for Strategic Development. The group designed educational programs and educational networks abroad. He made 20 educational films with his wife, Denise Rousseau, another professor at Carnegie Mellon. Two of the films were broadcast across America on the PBS channel. Goodman died in 2012.

== Works ==
- New Perspectives on Organizational Effectiveness (1978)
- Assessing Organizational Change (1980)
- Change in Organizations (1983)
- Absenteeism: New Approaches to Understanding, Measuring, and Managing Employee Absence (1984, editor)
- Designing Effective Work Groups (1987, editor)
