= William Ouchi =

American professor and author (born 1943)

- Born: William G. Ouchi; 1943 (age 82–83); Honolulu, Hawaii, United States
- Education: Williams College (BA); Stanford University (MBA degree); University of Chicago (PhD)
- Occupations: Professor, author

William G. "Bill" Ouchi (born 1943) is an American professor and author in the field of business management. He is the Distinguished Professor of Management and Organizations, Sanford and Betty Sigoloff Chair in Corporate Renewal at the UCLA Anderson School of Management.

== Early years and education ==
He was born and raised in Honolulu, Hawaii. He earned a BA from Williams College in 1965, and an MBA from Stanford University and a PhD in Business Administration from the University of Chicago. He was a Stanford business school professor for 8 years and has been a faculty member of the Anderson School of Management at University of California, Los Angeles for many years.

=== Theory Z ===
Ouchi first came to prominence for his studies of the differences between Japanese and American companies and management styles.

His first book in 1981 summarized his observations. Theory Z: How American Management Can Meet the Japanese Challenge and was a New York Times best-seller for over five months.

His second book, The M Form Society: How American Teamwork Can Recapture the Competitive Edge, examined various techniques implementing that approach.

Ouchi also came up with his three approaches to control in an organization's management:

- Market control
- Bureaucratic control
- Clan control

== Research regarding schools ==
In recent years Ouchi has turned his attention to the challenges posed for local schools by a top-down management style at the central office. He published an overview in 2003 in Making Schools Work. He chaired an education reform panel for Governor Arnold Schwarzenegger of California, and some of his proposals are being considered currently. In the 1990s, he served as advisor and chief of staff to former Los Angeles Mayor Richard Riordan.

In 2009 his book, The Secret of TSL: The Revolutionary Discovery That Raises School Performance was published which explores the revolutionary potential of reducing total student load, the number of students a teacher interacts with on a daily basis over the course of a semester.

== Other activities ==
In the larger community, Ouchi serves on the advisory board of the U.S. Commission on Presidential Debates, on the Board of Trustees of the Japanese American National Museum, and on the Board of Directors of The Alliance for College-Ready Public Schools - an operator of inner-city charter schools in Los Angeles.

He previously served on the boards of Williams College, KCET Public Television, The California Community Foundation, Leadership Education for Asian-Pacifics, the Consumer Advisory Committee of the U.S. Securities and Exchange Commission, Walt Disney Concert Hall, and of the Harvard-Westlake School.

In the business community, he serves on the boards of directors of The Hilton Foundation, AECOM, FirstFed Financial, Sempra Energy, and Water-Pik Technologies.

== Bibliography ==
- Ouchi, William G. (1981). Theory Z: How American Business Can Meet the Japanese Challenge. Addison-Wesley. ISBN 0-201-05524-4.
- Ouchi, William G. (1984). The M-form Society: How American Teamwork Can Recapture the Competitive Edge. Addison-Wesley. ISBN 0-201-05533-3.
- Ouchi, William G. (2003). Making Schools Work: A Revolutionary Plan To Get Your Children the education They Need. Simon and Schuster. ISBN 0-7432-4630-6.
- Ouchi, William G. (2009). The Secret of TSL:The Revolutionary Discovery That Raises School Performance. Simon and Schuster. ISBN 978-1-4391-2158-0.
- Ouchi, W. G. 1977. The Relationship Between Organizational Structure and Organizational Control. Administrative Science Quarterly, 22(1): 95–113.
- Ouchi, W. G. 1978. The Transmission of Control Through Organizational Hierarchy. Academy of Management Journal, 21: 173–192.
- Ouchi, W. G. 1979. A Conceptual Framework for the Design of Organizational Control Mechanisms. Management Science, 25(9): 833–848.
- Ouchi, W. G. & Wilkins, A. L. 1983. Efficient Cultures: Exploring the Relationship Between Culture and Organizational Performance. Administrative Science Quarterly, 28 (3): 468–481.
- Ouchi, W. G. & Wilkins, A. L. 1985. Organizational Culture. Annual Review of Sociology, 11: 457–483.

== See also ==
- Douglas McGregor
- Theory X and theory Y
- Theory Z
- List of business theorists

== External links and further reading ==
- "Beware of the Easy School Fix" opinion by Jay Mathews in The Washington Post September 26, 2009
