= Maintenance actions =

Maintenance actions, historically referred to as socio-emotive actions, are those leadership actions taken by one or more members of a group to enhance the social relationships among group members. They tend to increase the overall effectiveness of the group and create a more positive atmosphere of interaction within the group.

== Concept ==
Maintenance actions are contrasted with Task Actions which are those actions taken to enable the group to complete a specific task or goal.

Conceptually developed by social psychologist Kurt Lewin in his extensive research into group interaction during the 1940s, maintenance actions were extended into the discipline of leadership studies through the work of Douglas McGregor in his definitive statement of principles of leadership, The Human Side of Enterprise. Countless texts and "how to" manuals on group and team leadership since Lewin's work have sought to identify those activities which can then be used in group situations to maintain as well as increase friendship, warmth, and attachment among the participants of a group.

Maintenance actions can be understood as those activities which maintain the functioning of the group just as a driver of a car maintains the car by putting oil in the engine or making sure that the tires have enough pressure.

== Types ==
Lewin specifically identified ten types of maintenance actions: encourager of participation; harmonizer and compromiser; tension reliever; communication helper; evaluator of emotional climate; process observer; standard setter; active listener; trust builder; and interpersonal problem solver.

The most identifiable and popular of the ten types is the tension reliever or the person who relieves the tension within the group by telling jokes and stories, suggesting breaks or fun (as opposed to task) activities. (Later group and leadership writers frequently identify the person taking on this role as the group "clown".)

In contrast, often the hardest to identify is that of the process observer, similar to a participant observer, or the person who watches the interaction within the group as it unfolds and shares their observations with the other group members by continually pointing out ways in which the group behaviors become inconsistent or erratic which could throw the group off track in its attempt to accomplish a goal.

The type considered by group facilitators to be the most valuable role is that of interpersonal problem solver or the person who has the natural ability to help people solve their problems in a non-professional manner and draws other people in the group to them by their warmth and openness.

== Behaviour theory ==
The success of Lewin's work in defining these group activities is attributable to his explanation of them in behavior theory terms within the context of role theory . This was in contrast to both previous and subsequent research which would utilize such picturesque but often unrealistic terms for group behaviors such as the eagle, the bear, or the possum (creating confusion among group participants who may not share the same ideas of animal behavior as the theorist who proposed the terms). Lewin also sought to explain these maintenance actions within the context of immediate experience of the group participant as opposed to roles associated with a person's individual personality. Group psychotherapist Irvin Yalom presents a contrasting view to Lewin in his position that group behaviors are developed in an individual's first group experiences (primarily in their family of origin) and then carried with them from group to group for the rest of their lives.

Maintenance actions can also be seen as occurring on three levels of interaction within the group. On the primary level there are individual actions within the group which can be seen as maintenance actions. On the secondary level there are people whose majority of actions identify them as having a maintenance personality. On the highest level there are groups which take on the role of social interaction and support as their primary goal which are then identified as maintenance groups. Maintenance groups are seen frequently in society as in a support group, collections of people who meet with the intention of bonding and problem solving through shared experiences such as groups of cancer survivors or people coping with the loss of a loved one.

Maintenance actions have moved on to become the core of several social psychology theories of leadership and group interaction such as Fiedler's distributed actions model of group leadership; Bales' Interaction Process Analysis model; and Blanchard and Hershey's leadership effectiveness model.

Blanchard and Hershey have argued that more successful leaders combine both maintenance and task actions to a certain extent depending on the group members' abilities and experiences in order to achieve the most successful style and process of group leadership. Their concept is vividly underscored in Herman Wouk's popular novel, The Caine Mutiny where Wouk contrasts the effectiveness of a total task action oriented leader in the character of Captain Queeg versus the leader who combines maintenance and task actions in the character of Captain De Vriess. In the novel, the failure of Queeg to accurately identify the necessary combination of maintenance and task actions to suit the particular setting of the fictional Navy ship the U.S.S. Caine may be seen to lead to his inevitable downfall and the "mutiny" of the crew during a particularly life-threatening mission in the midst of a typhoon. This theme was repeated later in a cinematic form more recently in the movie Crimson Tide which pitted a task action oriented Captain (played by Gene Hackman) against a maintenance action Executive officer (played by Denzel Washington) in a battle for the crews' hearts and minds on a fictitious U.S. naval submarine.

A more popular view among group leaders and facilitators today is that groups rarely see leaders who exclusively choose one extreme of task actions versus the other extreme of maintenance actions, and are more likely to see a leader whose style is to combine the two styles of leadership in varying ways in relation to their own understanding of their ability to lead.
