= Norm of reciprocity =

Repayment in kind

The norm of reciprocity requires that people repay in kind what others have done for them. It can be understood as the expectation that people will respond to each other by returning benefits for benefits, and with either indifference or hostility to harms. The social norm of reciprocity may take different forms in different areas of social life, or in different societies. This is distinct from related ideas such as gratitude, the Golden Rule, or mutual goodwill. See reciprocity (social and political philosophy) for an analysis of the concepts involved.

The norm of reciprocity mirrors the concept of reciprocal altruism in evolutionary biology. However, evolutionary theory and therefore sociobiology was not well-received by mainstream psychologists. This led to reciprocal altruism being studied instead under a new social-psychological concept: the norm of reciprocity. Reciprocal altruism has been applied to various species, including humans, while mainstream psychologists use the norm of reciprocity only to explain humans.

A norm of reciprocity motivates, creates, sustains, and regulates the cooperative behavior required for self-sustaining social organizations. It limits the damage done by unscrupulous people, and contributes to social system stability. For more details, see the discussions in tit for tat and reciprocity (social psychology). The power and ubiquity of the norm of reciprocity can be used against the unwary, however, and is the basis for the success of many malicious confidence games, advertising and marketing campaigns, and varieties of propaganda in which a small gift of some kind is proffered with the expectation of producing in the recipient an eagerness to reciprocate (by purchasing a product, making a donation, or becoming more receptive to a line of argument).

For some legal scholars, reciprocity underpins international law "and the law of war specifically". Until well after World War II ended in 1945, the norm of reciprocity provided a justification for conduct in armed conflict. British jurist Hersch Lauterpacht noted in 1953 that "it is impossible to visualize the conduct of hostilities in which one side would be bound by rules of warfare without benefiting from them and the other side would benefit from rules of warfare without being bound by them."

== Positive and negative ==
The norm of reciprocity has positive and negative aspects.

- Positive norm of reciprocity: "The embedded obligations created by exchanges of benefits or favours among individuals. The recipient feels indebted to the favour or benefit giver until he/she repays". The positive reciprocity norm is a common social expectation in which a person who helps another person can expect positive feedback whether in the form of a gift, a compliment, a loan, a job reference, etc. In social psychology, positive reciprocity refers to responding to a positive action with another positive action (rewarding kind actions). This norm is so powerful, it may allow the initial giver to ask for something in return for what was given rather than having to wait for a voluntary reciprocal act. In some cases a person does not have to ask, because an expectation to return the favor is already implied. Reciprocity also works at the level of liking; We like people who help us, and dislike those who ask for help but never return it. Such disapproval is often enough to make people comply with the norm of reciprocity.
- Negative norm of reciprocity: "A negative norm of reciprocity represents the means by which individuals act against unfavourable treatments, and functions to keep balance in social systems". In contrast to the positive reciprocity norm, the negative reciprocity norm emphasizes the return of unfavourable treatment as an appropriate response to a misdeed. The principle of this norm serves as a powerful deterrent for violent or symbolic mistreatment. Harming others invites anger and revenge; people receiving negative treatment are likely to retaliate angrily. People with a propensity towards anger may more strongly endorse the negative reciprocity norm as a justification for consummating their hostility by punishing the instigator of mistreatment. In one study, most college students believed that criminal punishment should be determined by the seriousness of the crime rather than by punishment's effectiveness in preventing similar crimes.

There are contrasting ways to differentiate negative and positive norms of reciprocity. "In contrast to a positive norm of reciprocity Gouldner (1960) also suggested a negative norm of reciprocity or sentiments of retaliation where the emphasis is placed not on the return of benefits but on the return of injuries". So the norm may be characterized primarily in either a positive or negative way. However "both positive and negative norms or reciprocity serve as starting mechanisms as well as stabilizing functions in that they help initiate and maintain equitable interpersonal exchanges in human evolution".

== Sustainable Healthy Relationships (R-Model) ==
The R-Model was developed by Andrew Boyton as a theory sustainable healthy relationships with reciprocal elements at its core. The theory explains the need for reciprocity is necessary for the relationship to be sustainable and health. Without reciprocity the relationship is considered less sustainable and less healthy. R-Model proposes the need for balance and alignment in a relationship, and with balance there can be even growth in the relationship. A previous R-Model collaborator with Boyton was Jericho McClellan.

Because reciprocation is essential for maintaining sustainable, healthy relationships, reciprocation means that both parties in the relationship are giving freely. The reciprocal elements that are given freely, are offered without the expectation of reciprocation.

Whilst balance is required for health and sustainability, the R-Model theory proposes the need for "connected autonomy" and a focus on health, an example of how the R-Model could be used is to understand the nature of "tit for tat" games, and use the R-Model to break the cycle of "tit for tat" which requires conscious effort, self-awareness, and a commitment to improving the quality of your relationships. It often involves choosing compassion, consideration, and co-constructive communication over reactive and retaliatory behaviour.

When used as a diagnostic tool, the R-Model offers a profound awareness of how withholding reciprocity as a form of punishment within a relationship can be inherently destructive. In the intricate web of human relationships, reciprocity plays a fundamental role in nurturing trust and maintaining equilibrium. When one party chooses to withhold reciprocity in response to perceived slights or transgressions, it sets off a chain reaction of negativity, eroding the very foundations (Vital-Base) of the relationship. This withholding not only perpetuates a cycle of resentment (Victim) and retaliation (Viciousness) but also obstructs Vitality being channelled into the co-constructive communication necessary for resolving conflicts and fostering growth. By highlighting the destructive nature of this behaviour, the R-Model underscores the importance of Communication, Compassion, and Cooperation as constructive responses as alternatives to the detrimental path of negative reciprocity. It encourages individuals to recognise that withholding reciprocity often exacts a heavy toll on the well-being of a relationship, ultimately hindering its potential for mutual growth and connection.

The R-Model is a biopsychosocial model, a class of trans-disciplinary models which look at the interconnection between biology, psychology, and socio-environmental factors. It was first developed to understand the nature of relationship in the environment and discipline of group therapy. The initial model was influenced by works from Eric Berne, John Bowlby and George Kohlrieser.

== Private and public ==
=== Private reciprocation ===
The norm of reciprocity is usually internalised. In addition, all major ethical and religious traditions include reciprocity as a rule of moral behaviour—from Jesus (“As you would that men should do to you, do ye also to them likewise.” to Confucius (“What you do not want done to yourself, do not do to others.”). The moral character of the norm may encourage the sense that following it is an imperative rather than a choice, and failing to reciprocate should create feelings of self-reproach and guilt.

=== Public reciprocation ===
Another way to understand how the norm of reciprocity works is to understand that the initial favour and the following repayment unfold in a public way. The social rewards of sticking to the norm and the costs of breaching it are profound. People deny continued group membership to others who breach the norm.

The norm of reciprocity stipulates that the amount of the return to a favour is “roughly the same” as what had been received. Such idea of equivalence takes two forms;

Heteromorphic reciprocity
Things exchanged can be totally different, but they are equal in value, as defined by the stakeholders in the situation.
Homeomorphic reciprocity
Exchanges are identical in form, either with regard to the things exchanged or to the situations under which they are exchanged. Historically, the most significant expression of homeomorphic reciprocity is in the negative reciprocity norms; in retaliation, the focus is not on the return of benefits, but on the return of injuries.

However, Mark A. Whatley and colleagues found that people will give more favors, like a higher donation, if it is a public condition.

== Significance to social system stability ==
Favours given are not immediately repaid; returning of favours may take a long time. The intervening time period is governed by the norm of reciprocity in two manners.

1. The stakeholder is assembling, mobilizing, or liquidating resources or assets so as to make a suitable repayment.
2. It is a time period in which the relevant party should not do harm to people who have given them benefits; such people are morally constrained to demonstrate gratitude towards or maintain peace with their benefactors. As such, outstanding obligations can thus contribute to the stabilising of social systems by encouraging mutually beneficial exchange and cooperative behaviours.

The merely "rough equivalence" of repayment suggests an important system-stabilising function. It introduces an element of ambiguity as to whether the indebtedness has been repaid fully, thus creating uncertainty about who the indebted parties are. The comparative indeterminacy then serves as a type of all-purpose moral cement; it keeps us mindful of our behaviours and induces cooperative action.

The norm of reciprocity also contributes to social stability even when there is a well-developed system of specific status duties. Status duties shape behavior as the status occupant believes them to be binding; they are expected to faithfully fulfill their responsibilities. Nonetheless, the general norm of reciprocity offers another source of motivation and moral sanction for conforming with specific status obligations. If other people have been fulfilling their status responsibilities to you, you then have a second-order obligation to fulfill your status responsibilities to them as well. The feeling of gratitude reinforces that of rectitude and contributes to conformity, thus social stability.

== In organizational research ==
Perceived organizational support (POS) and perceived psychological contract violation (PPCV) are the two most common measures of the reciprocity norm in organizational research.

POS is the degree to which employees’ believe that their organization values their contributions and cares about their well-being. It is the organization’s contribution to a positive reciprocity dynamic with employees, as employees tend to perform better as a way to pay back POS.

PPCV is a construct that regards employees’ feelings of disappointment (ranging from minor frustration to betrayal) arising from their belief that their organization has broken its work-related promises. It is the organization’s contribution to a negative reciprocity dynamic, as employees tend to perform more poorly to pay back PPCV.

David R. Hekman and colleagues found that professional employees, such as doctors and lawyers, are most likely to repay POS with better performance when they have high levels of organizational identification combined with low levels of professional identification. Professional employees are most forgiving of PPCV when they have high levels of organizational identification combined with low levels of professional identification.

The norms of reciprocity in interactions among employees underlie Adam Grant's distinction between "giver cultures" and "taker cultures" as two end-points of a scale, with "matcher cultures" in between.

== In evolutionary psychology ==
Evolutionary psychologists have used the norm of reciprocity to explain altruism by emphasizing our expectations that “helping others will increase the likelihood that they will help us in the future.” The human desire to reciprocate kindness and to cooperate for survival value has enabled our continued existence in a hostile world. Thus, the norm of reciprocity ultimately has survival value. As this norm derives from our evolutionary history, adherence to it constitutes “natural” behavior whose neglect might cause a degree of dissonance. The norm of reciprocity is found in evolutionary psychology as reciprocal altruism, a concept coined by evolutionary biologist Robert Trivers. The rise of sociobiology was not well received by mainstream psychologists, and so reciprocal altruism was reinvented under the term "norm of reciprocity" in psychology. Study of the norm of reciprocity is arguably less scientifically advanced than that of reciprocal altruism, judging from the degree of research underneath the name "reciprocal altruism" as opposed to the name "norm of reciprocity".

== In developmental psychology ==
Developmental psychologists have studied the norm of reciprocity and the development of this norm in children. Psychologists have found that children begin to show reciprocal behavior around the age of two, when they observe the behavior of others and begin to have their own relationships with peers.

One way that psychologists have been able to study the norm of reciprocity in children is by observing and experimenting on their toy sharing behaviour. Kristina R. Olson and Elizabeth S. Spelke conducted an experiment in which they used dolls to represent family members and friends and gave the child various items to distribute to the dolls after a series of situations were explained to the child. These situations represented private and public reciprocity and gave the child the choice of which dolls to share the items with. An example of a situation involves one of the dolls sharing with the rest of them. Olson and Spelke found that children will give to family and friends more than strangers, repay those who shared with them, and reward those who share with others, even if they do not receive the item.

Psychologists Ken J. Rotenberg and Luanne Mann also explored the development of the reciprocity norm of self-disclosure and its functions in children’s attraction to peers. The findings indicated that the norm of reciprocity is involved in attraction to peers only by sixth grade; children in that cohort showed such an effect by reporting greater affection towards others who reciprocated the same amount of intimacy than those whose intimacy level deviated from the initiator’s. According to Youniss's theory of social development, children's friendship during the early part of middle childhood (5–8 years) is based upon reciprocity of behaviour that suggests a "tit-for-tat" rule of exchange and interaction. During the later part of middle childhood (9–11 years) and beyond, children's friendship is based on the reciprocity of behaviour that suggests a mutually cooperative principle of exchange as well as an appreciation of reciprocity.

== Studies ==
A study of 116 MBA students in the United States completed a series of self perception questions, which included the measure of the relational-self orientation, and then, six weeks later, completed a work relationship exercise during a class session. "In the exercise, participants read a vignette in which they were asked to imagine that they were the focal person in a reward allocation scenario at work." They were then told that they worked hard on the project together with a colleague, and made the same sort of effort and contribution to the project. Their supervisor then agreed to give them a $1000 reward. They were then given the following options on how to divide the money: (A) Your colleague will make a proposal as to how the money should be divided. (B) If you accept the proposal, then you will get what the colleague proposed to you. However, if you reject it, then the money will return to the company for future reward considerations. The results were positively and negatively skewed: If the two persons were close friends or colleagues the acceptance rate was 62% if the offer was 20% of the 1000 dollars, and 100% if the offer was 80% of the money. If the colleagues were distant then the rates were 20% for 20% of the money and 77% for 80% of the money.

== See also ==
- Inequity aversion – Preference for fairness and resistance to incidental inequalities
- Social preferences – Human tendency to care about social outcomes
