= Emotional exhaustion =

Chronic state of physical and emotional depletion

Emotional exhaustion is a symptom of burnout, a chronic state of physical and emotional depletion that results from excessive work or personal demands, or continuous stress. It describes a feeling of being emotionally overextended and exhausted by one's work. It is manifested by both physical fatigue and a sense of feeling psychologically and emotionally "drained".

An emotional hangover refers to the symptoms associated with a prolonged state of emotional exhaustion, which might occur following a highly emotional event, traumatic event or a stressful conversation or situation due to cognitive dissonance and emotional processing, that may last for hours or days. They can also arise following intense emotional experiences such as a move or a large financial purchase.

== Burnout ==
There are various ways in which burnout can occur such as: impacting an individual's physical, emotional, and behavioral aspects. Emotional exhaustion research has been guided by Christina Maslach's and Susan E. Jackson's three-component conceptualization of burnout. Which results from ongoing stress and poor stress management, has been defined as “a syndrome of emotional exhaustion, depersonalization, and a sense of low personal accomplishment that leads to decreased effectiveness at work” by the National Library of Medicine. This model suggests burnout consists of three interrelated parts: emotional exhaustion, depersonalization, and diminished personal accomplishment. Diminished personal accomplishment refers to negative evaluations of the self.

Some new perspectives on how to prevent burnout, also suggested by Christina Maslach, include two approaches. These two go about burnout differently in how they do not directly address stress, but rather the situation. The first approach includes recognizing how the relationship between person and situation are interacting. There may be some adjusting required to decrease the likelihood of burnout. Second, this approach takes burnout from a different standpoint and causes the person to evaluate their control over their situation. If the person has a better sense of their current situation and their ability to make decisions, they are less likely to get burned out.

== Determinants ==
The level of emotional exhaustion which is experienced by an employee is influenced by a variety of determinants, such as: personal resources, coping strategies, emotional culture, and supervisory regulation of display rules.

=== Personal resources ===
Personal resources, such as status, social support, money, or shelter, may reduce or prevent an employee's emotional exhaustion.

According to the Conservation of Resources theory (COR), people strive to obtain, retain and protect their personal resources, either instrumental (for example, money or shelter), social (such as social support or status), or psychological (for example, self-esteem or sense of autonomy). The COR's theory suggest that people must invest resources in order to protect against resource loss, recover from losses, and regain resources. Therefore, those with greater resources are less vulnerable to resource loss and more capable of orchestrating resource gain, whereas, for those with fewer resources, ongoing resource loss may result in a rapid influential loss spiral.

In a field study, those experiencing higher levels of job autonomy (the freedom to take initiative and exercise discretion in decision-making), low task complexity, supervisory support, and the internal locus of control (a tendency to attribute events to one's own control; such as the tendency to attribute a success to internal causes, like one's ability or effort, rather than external causes, such as good luck), tend to experience lower degrees of emotional exhaustion.

Similarly, researchers reveal that even though higher degree of using emotion regulation on the job is related to higher levels of employees' emotional exhaustion, when employees believe that they have autonomy in their job behaviors, emotion regulation, that is otherwise exhausting, is not associated with exhaustion at all.

Another field study, basing on a sample of call center workers in a large telecommunications corporation, indicate that employees who are highly identified with the service work, possess higher levels of self-efficacy (the belief in one's ability to succeed;), and receive social support from their supervisors, are less likely to experience emotional exhaustion.

In a study done with college students, burnout resulted from a lifestyle that required extremely high amounts of effort with low support systems in place to aid with stress coping. The personal resource of support mechanisms (such as social support) was determined to be a huge benefit that reduced the negative effects of stress that can lead to burnout.

=== Coping strategies ===
Researchers suggest that emotional exhaustion may be a result of using inadequate strategies in order to cope with problematic events on the job. Accordingly, there are empirical evidences that employees who tend to use more control strategies, which are considered more productive strategies (concerned with addressing the situation; such as direct action and help seeking) tend to experience lower levels of emotional exhaustion than do those who tend to use more escape strategies, which are considered inadequate strategies (used to avoid problems; such as avoidance and resignation with the problematic situation). Coping strategies can be used with a problem-focused perspective (previously called control strategies) or an avoidant/emotion-focused perspective (previously called escape strategies). Empirical research has found that exercising self-awareness, as a problem-focused strategy, and spending time with family, as an emotion-focused strategy, were the most used coping strategies.

=== Emotional culture ===
Regional and national cultures have been shown to have different norms for emotional expressions, and vary in their expectations for regulating and expressing emotions in the workplace. Such differences are part of the emotional culture of those cultures. Some cultures are more institutionally-oriented, with strong norms about regulating emotions to fulfill institutional roles and standards, whereas other cultures are more impulsively-oriented that value expressing unregulated emotions.

An example of a culture with a strong institutional-orientation toward emotions is the United States, due to the strong American norm to act positively and hide negative feelings ("the service with a smile" norm); whereas France can be used as an example of a country with a more impulsive-orientation toward emotions.

People within cultures that tend to use an impulsive orientation to understand and evaluate social situations are likely to feel more personal control over their expressions than people within institutional-oriented cultures, resulting in more of a buffer against strain and emotional exhaustion.

On the basis of those arguments, an organizational research investigated the influence of emotional culture on the degree of emotional exhaustion experienced by employees who work on jobs that include interaction with clients and emotional labor demands. In this study, among employees working at such jobs, those who belonged to more impulsive-oriented culture (France) showed lower degrees of emotional exhaustion, than those who belonged to more institutional-oriented culture (U.S.).

=== Supervisory regulation of "display rules" ===
Supervisors are likely to be important definers of interpersonal demands at the job level, given their direct influence on worker's beliefs about high-performance expectations. Moreover, supervisors' impressions of the importance of display rules (the rules about what kind of emotions are allowed to be expressed on the job) influence the employees' impressions of these display rules.

A recent study also suggests that employees who hold the same job (for example, call-center representatives) may experience the same "display rules" differently if they work for different supervisors, who vary in the emphasis they place on their subordinates' interpersonal role requirements, and by so, experience different levels of emotional exhaustion. Such that having a supervisor who places greater importance on interpersonal job demands results in greater emotional exhaustion (especially for those subordinates who have low career identity).

=== Social interaction model of effects on work strain ===
Current models of how emotion regulation impacts strain focus on intraindividual processes that operate within the mind and body of the person regulating the emotion, but these models have several limitations.

1. Research indicates that emotion regulation is sometimes positively, sometimes negatively and sometimes not associated with strain. The intraindividual models do not predict when strain increases or decreases.
2. The existing models do not distinguish between amplification and suppression of emotion, even though results tend to differ for them.
3. These models do not refer to the social or interpersonal functions of emotions.
4. They also do not explain the different effects that different discrete emotions have on strain (for example, pleasant vs. unpleasant).

Cote (2005) suggests a social interaction model that takes into account these limitations. In this model, work strain is predicted according to:

1. The type and authenticity of the emotion expressed by a sender in an interpersonal situation.
2. Receiver's skill of decoding emotion display.
3. Sender's response to receiver's reaction.

According to Cote (2005), interpersonal feedback is far more potent than intraindividual feedback, and dominates if the two processes are in opposition. The social interaction model suggests an alternate route by which to proceed with theory building and future research.

== Mechanisms ==
Though the underlying mechanics are unclear, an emotional hangover is thought to be due to the body's response to stress, as well as the cognitive effort required to process and reconcile the emotional experience with one's existing beliefs and values. This can lead to feelings of overwhelm, confusion, and even physical symptoms such as fatigue or headaches.

Emotional hangovers highlight the nexus between cognitive and emotional processes.

== Implications ==
Researches have linked emotional exhaustion to a plethora of ailments, and a general breakdown in feelings of community. However, a growing body of research has begun to demonstrate that emotional exhaustion can have deleterious consequences for organizations as well.

For example, Russell Cropanzano and his colleagues, in their two field studies, indicate that exhausted employees show lower organizational commitment, lower job performance, less organizational citizenship behaviors (OCB) directed toward the organization (OCBO) and their supervisors (OCBS), and higher turnover intentions. They suggest that emotional exhaustion can be seen as a cost that qualifies the value of any benefits received through employment, and so that an organization, which overworks its employees to the point of emotional exhaustion, may be seen as unfair.

Similarly, longitudinal studies found that exhausted employees show not only lower job performance, but also more absences, and greater likelihood of seeking employment elsewhere (actual voluntary turnover).

Emotion can induce physiological brain changes that persist.

== See also ==
- Hangxiety
- Organizational justice
- Perceived organizational support
- Perceived psychological contract violation
