= Difficult conversation =

A difficult conversation is a dialogue addressing sensitive, controversial, or emotionally charged topics, often with the potential for conflict, discomfort, or disagreement. Broadly, a difficult conversation is anything an individual finds hard to talk about. These types of conversations often require navigating complex social, emotional, and cognitive factors and active listening skills in order to foster productive communication and avoid misunderstandings, escalation, or relationship damage. In many cases, they may also require addressing power dynamics, historical context, or cultural differences in order to facilitate effective communication and avoid perpetuating harmful patterns of interaction.

Difficult conversations are often characterised by the presence of competing goals, values, or interests between the parties involved. They also have the potential for triggering deep-seated emotions, beliefs, or personal vulnerabilities, making them uncomfortable and hard to initiate. Even everyday topics can provoke anxiety, especially when self-esteem or close connections are at risk. People often perceive a conflict between honesty and kindness in difficult conversations, overestimating the harm of truth-telling, although careful honesty can strengthen trust. Fear of anger, shame, or saying the wrong thing also frequently prevents open dialogue, particularly around sensitive issues such as race.

As a result, it is common for people to procrastinate, backpedal, and dodge to avoid having difficult conversations, a phenomenon known as the “MUM effect,” where people withhold unpleasant messages to avoid discomfort. Avoidance may feel safer, allowing individuals to believe they have not done harm by withholding information, but it often blocks feedback and undermines understanding. Avoidance is also used in sensitive contexts to prevent saying something that could be misinterpreted.

== Theoretical Frameworks ==
Although common in personal and professional life, difficult conversations have received limited attention in empirical research. However, psychological and communication theories help explain why they feel so challenging:

=== Cognitive dissonance ===
Cognitive dissonance theory explains how individuals experience immediate psychological discomfort when their actions, beliefs, or values are in conflict. In the context of difficult conversations, cognitive dissonance can arise when one’s choice to engage contradicts their wish to avoid unpleasantness or when being honest conflicts with a desire to protect others’ feelings. This tension often leads to avoidance of information or situations that increase dissonance.

=== Threat to self-image (Face-Negotiation Theory) ===
Face-negotiation theory suggests people work to maintain social self-worth or “face” during interactions. From an evolutionary perspective, maintaining social standing was critical in ancestral environments, where status influenced access to resources and mating opportunities. As a result, humans evolved to be highly sensitive to face threats, making difficult conversations stressful when they risk embarrassment, shame, or reputational loss. Cultural differences in face management, such as directness in individualistic cultures versus indirectness in collectivist ones, can further complicate communication and escalate conflict.

== Contexts ==
These types of conversations can arise in a variety of contexts, including personal relationships, professional settings, or social interactions, and may involve topics such as politics, religion, race or sexuality.

=== Personal relationships ===
Close relationships (e.g., romantic, family, or friendships) may involve conflict, emotional disclosures, or delivering bad news. Such conversations, while less frequent than casual talk, represent a significant share of communication in close relationships.

=== Healthcare ===
In healthcare, difficult conversations typically involve disclosing diagnoses or discussing end-of-life care. Difficult conversations may arise between a healthcare provider and a patient, but physicians often lack training in these sensitive discussions, leading to patient distress and provider burnout. Communication frameworks like SPIKES for delivering bad news and NURSE to respond to emotion help improve these exchanges by promoting empathy and clarity.

=== Workplace ===
Difficult conversations, including performance reviews, conflict resolution, and ethical concerns, may arise in the workplace. These discussions may occur between supervisors and employees or among peers. Communication training is essential to reduce misunderstandings and effectively manage conflict.

== Approaches ==
Difficult conversations, when handled constructively, can strengthen relationships and improve organisational outcomes, fostering well-being, closeness, and collaboration. Poorly managed, however, they risk escalating tension and dysfunction.

Reducing and managing fear or anxiety effectively is a more realistic goal than aiming to eliminate these emotions entirely. Several approaches have been proposed to support this process.

=== The Three Conversations Model ===
Douglas Stone, Bruce Patton and Sheila Heen describe three overlapping layers in difficult conversations:

1. The “What Happened?” conversation involves disagreements about facts, intentions, or blame.
2. The “Feelings” conversation addresses unspoken or suppressed emotions that influence tone and reactions.
3. The “Identity” conversation is the internal dialogue about what the situation implies about one's self-worth, competence, or moral character.

Recognising these layers helps reduce tension and improve communication. They recommend turning the conversation into a “learning conversation” by shifting from a stance of certainty or judgment to one of curiosity.

In the “What Happened?” layer, this involves understanding each other’s perspectives and recognising mutual contributions. In the “Feelings” layer, acknowledging emotions without judgment reduces defensiveness and fosters empathy. For the “Identity” conversation, maintaining internal balance and embracing a nuanced view of the self helps navigate emotional moments without feeling threatened.

=== Benevolent honesty ===
Another approach is “benevolent honesty”, maximising both honesty and benevolence in difficult discussions instead of seeing them as conflicting. Rooted in the dual concerns model of conflict resolution, this approach involves delivering direct information while offering support to help recipients process and benefit from it (e.g., doctors providing emotional support when giving bad news). It frames honesty as constructive rather than cruel but only works in cases where honest feedback benefits the recipient long-term, as some truths may only cause unnecessary harm.

=== High-quality listening ===
Others argue for the importance of high-quality listening, defined as attentive, empathetic, and nonjudgmental communication. This autonomy-supportive approach draws on Self-Determination Theory, this approach satisfies speakers' psychological needs for autonomy (feeling authentic) and relatedness (feeling connected). By creating a safe space where speakers feel understood, high-quality listening reduces defensiveness and promotes introspection. This fosters openness to new information and encourages positive attitude change. Developing high-quality listening skills is essential for improving interactions, especially in challenging, personal, or controversial conversations.
