= Professional identification =

Type of social identification

Professional Identification is a type of social identification and is the sense of oneness individuals have with a profession (e.g. law, medicine) and the degree to which individuals define themselves as profession members. Professional identity consists of the individual's alignment of roles, responsibilities, values, and ethical standards to be consistent with practices accepted by their specific profession.

== Sources of professional identification ==
Researchers have found that a desire for quality (rather than profits) is associated with professional identification. Organizations tend to be concerned with efficiency and profitability, whereas professions care mainly about providing the highest-quality service (as defined by the professions), almost regardless of cost or revenue considerations (Freidson, 2001). Administrators are usually seen as promoting profitability at the expense of profession-defined quality (Freidson, 2001). In one notable study, practicing physicians viewed administrators with medical degrees (e.g., the M.D.) as “outsiders” to the medical profession because of what the physicians believed to be the administrators’ undue emphasis on organizational goals (Hoff, 1999: 336). Practicing physicians viewed administrators with MDs more negatively than those without MDs because the former were thought to have “betrayed” the medical profession by assuming administrative roles (Hoff, 1999: 344).

== Formation of professional identity ==
Professional identity formation is a complex process through which the sense of oneness with a profession is developed, with some of the difficulty arising out of balancing personal identity with professional identity. Professional identity begins to form while individuals gain their educational training for their profession. Drawing on community of practice theory, transitions between communities can lead to the individual experiencing tension or conflict in how the distinct communities' values and expectations differ, causing the individual to restructure the boundaries between their professional, personal, and private spheres of identity.

== Recent research ==
For over 50 years, researchers have studied whether professional employees' social identities influence their work behaviors. David R. Hekman and colleagues found that professional identification may conflict with organizational identification. Organizational identification may lead employees to believe that administrators are “like them” and “on their side", whereas professional identification leads employees to believe that administrators are “not like them” and “not on their side”.

== See also ==
- Acculturation
- Onboarding
- Socialization
