= Perceived organizational support =

Extent to which employees feel valued

Perceived organizational support (POS) is the degree to which employees believe that their organization values their contributions and cares about their well-being and fulfills socioemotional needs. POS is generally thought to be the organization's contribution to a positive reciprocity dynamic with employees, as employees tend to perform better to reciprocate received rewards and favorable treatment. This idea bloomed from Eisenberger and Rhoades' organizational support theory.

== Overview ==
According to the POS website:

Research on POS began with the observation that managers' concern with their employees' commitment to the organization is positively correlated with employees' focus on the organization's commitment to them. For employees, organizations serve as important sources of socioemotional resources like respect and care, as well as tangible benefits like wages and medical benefits.

- Being regarded highly by the organization helps to meet employees' needs for approval, esteem, and affiliation.
- Positive evaluation by the organization also provides an indication that increased effort will be noted and rewarded.
- Employees, therefore, take an active interest in the regard with which they are held by their employer.

POS can also be used to offer an explanation for organizational cynicism. Organizational cynicism is related to job satisfaction; it is an attitude toward an organization reflecting one's beliefs about their experience as part of the organization. Just as POS explains employees' feelings of value, meaning, identity, etc., it explains employees' feelings of discouragement and distance from their organization. Psychologist James Dean studied employees and found that the biggest cause of cynicism was change that was perceived to be out of the employee's control. Eisenberger and Rhoades found that changes made within the organization were less supported by employees when the changes were perceived to be out of their control.

By studying the relationship between OC and POS, Byrne and Hochwarter found that people who feel high OC may "negatively construe" POS.

POS is higher when employees think that they will benefit directly from an organizational change. Changes and improvements to outside facets of the organization can be under-appreciated if the benefits are indirectly related to the organization in which the employee works. There is a certain value that comes from a tangible benefit.

Organizational support theory (OST) says that in order to meet socioemotional needs and to assess the benefits of increased work effort, employees form an opinion of the level of care the employer has for their wellbeing. A positive perception would increase their identification with the organization and contribute to their expectation that improved performance would be rewarded. Behavioral outcomes of POS would include increased in-role and extra-role performance, increased organizational commitment, and decreased withdrawal behaviors such as absenteeism and turnover.

Although there were relatively few studies of POS until the mid-1990s, research on the topic has burgeoned in the last few years. Rhoades and Eisenberger's meta-analysis covered some 70 POS studies carried out through 1999, and over 300 studies have been performed since. The meta-analysis found clear and consistent relationships of POS with its predicted antecedents and consequences. An updated meta-analysis by Kurtessis, Eisenberger, Ford, Buffardi, Stewart, and Adis covered 558 studies.

== Common antecedents ==
The three common antecedents of perceived organizational support are fairness, supervisor support, and organizational rewards and job condition. When employees perceive that they are receiving fair treatment in comparison to their coworkers, they perceive more support. The equity theory says that employees feel entitled to what they are given as workers based on their inputs to the job. Therefore, fairness can be perceived even if the rewards differ in size, based on employee rank. Fairness can also be described as procedural justice, or the fairness of happenings in the organization. The politics of the organization, or the promoting of self-interest, are often related to employees' perceptions of procedural justice.

Supervisor support was found by Eisenberger and Rhoades to be strongly related to employees' perception of support. Typically, people view their employer's actions, morals, and beliefs to be indicative and representative of the organization's actions, morals, and beliefs. POS tends to be higher when the supervisor or higher employer is thought to care about the employee's experience at work and does what he or she can to show appreciation for the work done.

Organizational rewards and job conditions play a large role in perceived organizational support as well. Sometimes, extrinsic motivation can mean more to an employee than intrinsic motivation because perceived appreciation has the power to turn a bitter employee into a content employee. Eisenberger and Rhoades discuss the many ways that employers can show appreciation and reward their employees. A few examples are paying their employees fairly; recognizing their employees for new ideas, exceptional work, etc.; promoting their employees when they deserve it; providing job security as incentive to remain with the organization; encouraging autonomy to correspondingly increase production and morale; reduce stress when made aware of it; and to provide proper training, to ensure employees' confidence in their jobs. Some of these factors carry less weight than others do. Being autonomous increases an employee's desire to continue to remain loyal to their organization because if he feels competent and confident in his ability to do well, he will be less likely to give up or lose faith.

== Common consequences ==
There are many possible consequences of POS discussed in Eisenberger and Rhoade's meta-analysis of studies done on POS. The first is organizational commitment. There are three kinds of organizational commitment: affective commitment, continuance commitment, and normative commitment. Affective commitment, or feeling an emotional tie to one's organization, is important in employees because it demonstrates a deeper meaning for work than simply earning money. Continuance commitment, or knowing that staying with one's organization will be less costly in the end than leaving, is telling of extrinsic motivation to remain wherever one will profit the most. Normative commitment, or feeling compelled to stay because everyone else is, is less significant than the first two but is still considered to have an effect on employees. Some other consequences of POS include changes in withdrawal behavior, the desire to remain, strains on employees, performance, job related affect, and job related involvement. Levy also discusses absence rates, turnover, and counterproductive behaviors. Changes in these can result in undesired employee action.

POS can be positive if reciprocation of support and respect occurs between employer and employee. If the reciprocation does occur and the employee feels that he or she is being appreciated and respected for the work that he or she is doing, the POS is increased. If the respect and appreciation is either not present or is not expressed adequately, then the employee may begin to harbor suspicion, which may increase organizational cynicism. Organizational commitment may, at that point, be lessened; thus jeopardizing the stability of the organization. Reciprocation can include a wide array of things, such as pleasing pay and benefits, a promotion, mutual respect between employer and employee, etc.

== Effects on performance ==
According to an experiment done by a group led by Wayne Hochwarter, there is a non-linear relationship between POS and performance. Predicted was that high POS was correlated with high performance. Of course, perfect correlations happen infrequently. Just as POS does not always positively correlate with performance, neither does job satisfaction. Although POS probably does have an effect on many employees' performance, it does not necessarily cause performance to increase or decrease in productivity.

A low perception of organizational support can result in employees being wary of reciprocation. Reciprocation wariness can be caused by events that are perceived as not being beneficial to the employee, for example, not receiving payment seemed necessary, or not receiving a good payment for the appropriate length of time. Authors Lynch and Armeli wrote that "fewer companies today than in the past implicitly guarantee long-term employment, provide generous pay increments and comprehensive health benefits, or subsidize general education courses." Examples like these are possible sources for reciprocation wariness to bloom amongst employees, potentially lowering their perceptions of organizational support.

== Socioemotional effects ==
Emotional support is just as important in employee health as it is in non-work related circumstances. It is important for POS to be high because an employee's feeling of belonging, respect, and support raises their morale, which has a positive effect on performance. It is similar to the feeling of support from family and friends. However, although each employee most likely has some need to be fulfilled, those needs are not necessarily all the same. Also, some employees might need more support than others. Some might have higher socioemotional needs. An example given in an article on POS was about police officers. The police officers who needed more "approval, esteem, emotional support, or affiliation" issued more speeding tickets and arrested more people for driving under the influence when their POS was high.

Accordingly, strain is affected by POS. When POS is low, strain tends to be perceived in greater intensity. When POS is high, strain is generally perceived as lower, even if it is just as present

=== Measurement items ===
The Survey of Perceived Organizational Support was originally constructed with 32 items. Subsequent versions, however, have displayed adequate psychometric properties using 8 or as few as 3 items. Respondents are asked to indicate the extent to which they agree with the following statements on a seven-point scale.

Example items include:

1. My organization cares about my opinions.
2. My organization really cares about my well-being.
3. My organization strongly considers my goals and values.
4. Help is available from my organization when I have a problem.
5. My organization would forgive an honest mistake on my part and HR develops brisk method of 'how to retain self-worth when inexperienced in asking for help early in the process.
6. If given the opportunity, my organization would take advantage of me. (item is reverse-coded)
7. My organization shows very little concern for me. (item is reverse-coded)
8. My organization is willing to help me, if a brisk life rebalancing method is needed or utilized.

By using specific facets in the survey, respondents are able to provide specific answers about problems that may be unknown to employers. If aware of a general problem, employers might be unable to take action because they do not know how to fix specific issues. The Job Descriptive Index (JDI) is the most frequently used measure of job satisfaction that does not specifically measure perceived organizational support but does have the ability to make clear areas that are in need of improvement.

== See also ==
- Emotional exhaustion
- Misplaced loyalty
- Norm of reciprocity
- Perceived psychological contract violation
