= Theory Z of Ouchi =

So-called Japanese management style of the 1980s

Theory Z of Ouchi is Dr. William Ouchi's so-called "Japanese Management" style popularized during the Asian economic boom of the 1980s.

For Ouchi, 'Theory Z' focused on increasing employee loyalty to the company by providing a job for life with a strong focus on the well-being of the employee, both on and off the job. According to Ouchi, Theory Z management tends to promote stable employment, high productivity, and high employee morale and satisfaction.

"Japanese Management" and Theory Z itself were based on Dr. W. Edwards Deming's famous "14 points". Deming, an American scholar whose management and motivation theories were more popular outside the United States, helped lay the foundation of Japanese organizational development during their expansion in the world economy in the 1980s. Deming's theories are summarized in his two books, Out of the Crisis and The New Economics, in which he spells out his "System of Profound Knowledge". He was a frequent advisor to Japanese business and government leaders, and eventually became a revered counselor. Deming was awarded the Second Order of the Sacred Treasures by the former Emperor Hirohito, and American businesses tried to use his "Japanese" approach to improve their competitive position.

== History ==
Professor Ouchi spent years researching Japanese companies and examining American companies using the Theory Z management styles. By the 1980s, Japan was known for the highest productivity anywhere in the world, while America had fallen drastically. The word "Wa" in Japanese can be applied to Theory Z because they both deal with promoting partnerships and group work. The word "Wa" means a perfect circle or harmony, which influences Japanese society to always be in teams and to come to a solution together. And also because the Japanese show a high level of enthusiasm to work, some of the researchers claim that 'Z' in the theory Z stands for 'Zeal'.

Ouchi wrote a book called Theory Z How American Business Can Meet the Japanese Challenge (1981), in this book; Ouchi shows how American corporations can meet the Japanese challenges with a highly effective management style that promises to transform business in the 1980s. The secret to Japanese success, according to Ouchi, is not technology, but a special way of managing people. "This is a managing style that focuses on a strong company philosophy, a distinct corporate culture, long-range staff development, and consensus decision-making" (Ouchi, 1981). Ouchi shows that the results show lower turn-over, increased job commitment, and dramatically higher productivity.

William Ouchi doesn't say that the Japanese culture for business is necessarily the best strategy for the American companies but he takes Japanese business techniques and adapts them to the American corporate environment. Much like McGregor's theories, Ouchi's Theory Z makes certain assumptions about workers. Some of the assumptions about workers under this theory include the idea that workers tend to want to build happy and intimate working relationships with those that they work for and with, as well as the people that work for them. Also, Theory Z workers have a high need to be supported by the company, and highly value a working environment in which such things as family, cultures and traditions, and social institutions are regarded as equally important as the work itself. These types of workers have a very well developed sense of order, discipline, a moral obligation to work hard, and a sense of cohesion with their fellow workers. Finally, Theory Z workers, it is assumed, can be trusted to do their jobs to their utmost ability, so long as management can be trusted to support them and look out for their well being (Massie & Douglas, 1992).

One of the most important pieces of this theory is that management must have a high degree of confidence in its workers in order for this type of participative management to work. This theory assumes that workers will be participating in the decisions of the company to a great degree. Ouchi explains that the employees must be very knowledgeable about the various issues of the company, as well as possessing the competence to make those decisions. He also points out; however, that management sometimes has a tendency to underestimate the ability of the workers to effectively contribute to the decision making process (Bittel, 1989). But for this reason, Theory Z stresses the need for the workers to become generalists, rather than specialists, and to increase their knowledge of the company and its processes through job rotations and constant training. Actually, promotions tend to be slower in this type of setting, as workers are given a much longer opportunity to receive training and more time to learn the ins and outs of the company's operations. The desire, under this theory, is to develop a work force, which has more of a loyalty towards staying with the company for an entire career, and be more permanent than in other types of settings. It is expected that once an employee does rise to a position of high level management, they will know a great deal more about the company and how it operates, and will be able to use Theory Z management theories effectively on the newer employees (Luthans, 1989, p. 36).
