= Theory X and Theory Y =

Theories of human motivation

Mnemonic device for the two theories: a person refusing to work ("X") and a person cheering the opportunity to work ("Y")

Theory X and Theory Y are theories of human work motivation and management. They were created by Douglas McGregor while he was working at the MIT Sloan School of Management in the 1950s, and developed further in the 1960s. McGregor's work was rooted in motivation theory alongside the works of Abraham Maslow, who created the hierarchy of needs. The two theories proposed by McGregor describe contrasting models of workforce motivation applied by managers in human resource management, organizational behavior, organizational communication and organizational development. Theory X explains the importance of heightened supervision, external rewards, and penalties, while Theory Y highlights the motivating role of job satisfaction and encourages workers to approach tasks without direct supervision. Management use of Theory X and Theory Y can affect employee motivation and productivity in different ways, and managers may choose to implement strategies from both theories into their practices.

== McGregor and Maslow ==
McGregor's Theory X and Theory Y and Maslow's hierarchy of needs are both rooted in motivation theory. Maslow's hierarchy of needs consists of physiological needs (lowest level), safety needs, love needs, esteem needs, and self-actualization (highest level). According to Maslow, a human is motivated by the level they have not yet reached, and self-actualization cannot be met until each of the lower levels has been fulfilled. Assumptions of Theory Y, in relation to Maslow's hierarchy put an emphasis on employee higher level needs, such as esteem needs and self-actualization.

McGregor also believed that self-actualization was the highest level of reward for employees. He theorized that the motivation employees use to reach self-actualization allows them to reach their full potential. This led companies to focus on how their employees were motivated, managed, and led, creating a Theory Y management style which focuses on the drive for individual self-fulfillment. McGregor's perspective places the responsibility for performance on managers as well as subordinates.

== Theory X ==
Theory X is based on negative assumptions regarding the typical worker. This management style assumes that the typical worker has little ambition, avoids responsibility, and is individual-goal oriented. In general, Theory X style managers believe their employees are less intelligent, lazier, and work solely for a sustainable income. Management believes employees' work is based on their own self-interest. Managers who believe employees operate in this manner are more likely to use rewards or punishments as motivation. Due to these assumptions, Theory X concludes the typical workforce operates more efficiently under a hands-on approach to management. Theory X managers believe all actions should be traceable to the individual responsible. This allows the individual to receive either a direct reward or a reprimand, depending on the outcome's positive or negative nature. This managerial style is more effective when used in a workforce that is not essentially motivated to perform.

According to McGregor, there are two opposing approaches to implementing Theory X: the hard approach and the soft approach. The hard approach depends on close supervision, intimidation, and immediate punishment. This approach can potentially yield a hostile, minimally cooperative workforce and resentment towards management. Managers are always looking for mistakes from employees, because they do not trust their work. Theory X is a "we versus they" approach, meaning it is the management versus the employees.

The soft approach is characterized by leniency and less strict rules in hopes for creating high workplace morale and cooperative employees. Implementing a system that is too soft could result in an entitled, low-output workforce. McGregor believes both ends of the spectrum are too extreme for efficient real-world application. Instead, McGregor feels that an approach located in the middle would be the most effective implementation of Theory X.

Because managers and supervisors are in almost complete control of the work, this produces a more systematic and uniform product or work flow. Theory X can benefit a work place that utilizes an assembly line or manual labor. Using this theory in these types of work conditions allows employees to specialize in particular work areas which in turn allows the company to mass-produce a higher quantity and quality of work.

== Theory Y ==
Theory Y is based on positive assumptions regarding the typical worker. Theory Y managers assume employees are internally motivated, enjoy their job, and work to better themselves without a direct reward in return. These managers view their employees as one of the most valuable assets to the company, driving the internal workings of the corporation. Employees additionally tend to take full responsibility for their work and do not need close supervision to create a quality product. However, before an employee carries out their task, they must first obtain the manager's approval. This ensures work stays efficient, productive, and in-line with company standards.

Theory Y managers gravitate towards relating to the worker on a more personal level, as opposed to a more conductive and teaching-based relationship. As a result, Theory Y followers may have a better relationship with their boss, creating a healthier atmosphere in the workplace. In comparison to Theory X, Theory Y incorporates a pseudo-democratic environment to the workforce. This allows the employee to design, construct, and publish their work in a timely manner in co-ordinance to their workload and projects.

Although Theory Y encompasses creativity and discussion, it does have limitations. While there is a more personal and individualistic feel, this leaves room for error in terms of consistency and uniformity. The workplace lacks unvarying rules and practices, which could potentially be detrimental to the quality standards of the product and strict guidelines of a given company.

== Theory Z ==
Humanistic psychologist Abraham Maslow, upon whose work McGregor drew for Theories X and Y, went on to propose his own model of workplace motivation, Theory Z. Unlike Theories X and Y, Theory Z recognizes a transcendent dimension to work and worker motivation. An optimal managerial style would help cultivate worker creativity, insight, meaning and moral excellence.

== Choosing a management style ==
For McGregor, Theory X and Theory Y are not opposite ends of the same continuum, but rather two different continua in themselves. In order to achieve the most efficient production, a combination of both theories may be appropriate. This approach is derived from Fred Fiedler's research over various leadership styles known as the contingency theory. This theory states that managers evaluate the workplace and choose their leadership style based upon both internal and external conditions presented. Managers who choose the Theory X approach have an authoritarian style of management. An organization with this style of management is made up of several levels of supervisors and managers who actively intervene and micromanage the employees. On the contrary, managers who choose the Theory Y approach have a hands-off style of management. An organization with this style of management encourages participation and values individuals' thoughts and goals. However, because there is no optimal way for a manager to choose between adopting either Theory X or Theory Y, it is likely that a manager will need to adopt both approaches depending on the evolving circumstances and levels of internal and external locus of control throughout the workplace.

== Military command and control ==
Theory X and Theory Y also have implications in military command and control (C2). Older, strictly hierarchical conceptions of C2, with narrow centralization of decision rights, highly constrained patterns of interaction, and limited information distribution tend to arise from cultural and organizational assumptions compatible with Theory X. On the other hand, more modern, network-centric, and decentralized concepts of C2, that rely on individual initiative and self-synchronization, tend to arise more from a "Theory Y" philosophy. Mission Command, for example, is a command philosophy to which many modern military establishments aspire, and which involves individual judgment and action within the overall framework of the commander's intent. Its assumptions about the value of individual initiative make it more a Theory Y than a Theory X philosophy.

== See also ==
- Outline of management
- Scientific management
- Type A and Type B personality theory
