= David R. Hekman =

American academic

David R. Hekman (born 1978) is an associate professor of organizational leadership and information analytics at the University of Colorado at Boulder. Hekman's research focuses on improving organizational health, including the demographic pay gap and the demographic power gap. His work has been written about in The New York Times, The Washington Post, The Boston Globe, The Chicago Tribune, The Atlantic, and Forbes.

== Career ==
In 2000, Hekman was hired by aerospace manufacturing company Goodrich Corporation. In 2002, he began teaching business at the University of Washington. In 2005, Hekman was hired as a consultant to Mark Emmert, University of Washington president.

In 2007, Hekman was hired as a research faculty in the University of Washington School of Public Health. He taught health care management and strategic management at the University of Wisconsin-Milwaukee from 2008 to 2012. He now teaches organizational behavior at the University of Colorado at Boulder.

Hekman's research focuses on improving organizational health by minimizing organizational problems and increasing workplace virtues. Hekman has examined the pay disparity between white men and women and minorities, finding that customers who viewed videos featuring a black male, a white female, or a white male actor playing the role of an employee helping a customer were 19 percent more satisfied with the white male employee's performance. In a second study, he found that white male doctors were rated as more approachable and competent than equally well performing women or minority doctors.

Hekman has also shown that female and nonwhite executives who promote diversity tend to be penalized with lower performance ratings. This article helps explain the persistence of the demographic power gap within organizations. Women and minorities may feel discouraged from hiring and promoting individuals who look like them because they are subconsciously aware that their bosses will judge them harshly for doing so.

Hekman also examined physicians' attachment to their employers, physician technology resistance, and health care quality, finding that an employee's weak attachment is socially contagious, ultimately leading coworkers to leave the organization.

Hekman has also studied how to promote virtue in the workplace. He observed that leader humility involves leaders modeling to followers how to grow by engaging in the three behaviors of admitting weaknesses, appreciating followers' strengths, and modeling teachability. He identified four main types of workplace courage: standing up to authority, uncovering mistakes, structuring uncertainty, and protecting those in need.
