= Douglas McGregor =

American management professor (1906–1964)

Douglas Murray McGregor
- Born: September 16, 1906; Detroit, Michigan, U.S.
- Died: October 13, 1964 (aged 58); Concord, Massachusetts, U.S.
- Alma mater: Wayne University (A.B.); Harvard University (M.A., Ph.D.)
- Occupations: Management professor, author
- Writing career
- Notable work: The Human Side of Enterprise (1960)

Douglas Murray McGregor (September 16, 1906 – October 13, 1964) was an American management professor at the MIT Sloan School of Management and president of Antioch College from 1948 to 1954. He also taught at the Indian Institute of Management Calcutta. His 1960 book The Human Side of Enterprise had a profound influence on education practices.

McGregor was a student of Abraham Maslow. He has contributed much to the development of the management and motivational theory, and is best known for his Theory X and Theory Y as presented in his book 'The Human Side of Enterprise' (1960), which proposed that manager's individual assumptions about human nature and behavior determined how individual manages their employees.

== Early life and education ==
McGregor was born in Detroit, Michigan on September 16, 1906, to Murray James and Jessie Adelia McGregor. When he was young he volunteered in homeless shelters, played piano, and sang. When McGregor was in high school, he worked for his family business, the McGregor Institute. The McGregor Institute, first known as the Mission for Homeless Men, served the Detroit homeless population with spiritual and career services. McGregor's uncle, his father Murray's brother, is Detroit philanthropist Tracy W. McGregor.

He earned a B.E. (Mechanical) from Rangoon Institute of Technology, a BA from Wayne State University in 1932, then earned an MA and PhD in psychology from Harvard University in 1933 and 1935 respectively. McGregor originally dropped out of Wayne State to work as a gas station attendant in Buffalo, New York, and was a regional manager by 1930, though he later returned to school. When the McGregor Institute was given a grant by the Detroit Department of Public Works, McGregor returned to Wayne State to finish his degree in 1932.

== Career ==
After teaching at Harvard University and then MIT, where he was one of the first professors in the Sloan School of Management, he served as president of Antioch College Ohio, now known as Antioch University Midwest, from 1948 to 1954. In 1954, McGregor returned to teaching at MIT, where he taught until his death in 1964.

He later served as a member of the Antioch College Ohio Board of Trustees.

== The Human Side of Enterprise ==
In the book The Human Side of Enterprise, McGregor identified an approach of creating an environment within which employees are motivated via authoritative direction and control or integration and self-control, which he called theory X and theory Y, respectively. Having an attitude that workers generally lack motivation, enjoyment, and responsibility in their work is a manager that subscribes to Theory X. Having an attitude that workers are content, motivated, and long for responsibility is manager that subscribes to Theory Y. He is responsible for breaking down previous management styles with The X and Y Theory which created a new role for managers to assume. Theory Y is the practical application of Dr. Abraham Maslow's Humanistic School of Psychology, or Third Force psychology, applied to scientific management. He is commonly thought of as being a proponent of Theory Y, but, as Edgar Schein tells in his introduction to McGregor's subsequent, posthumous (1967), book The Professional Manager: "In my own contacts with Doug, I often found him to be discouraged by the degree to which theory Y had become as monolithic a set of principles as those of Theory X, the over-generalization which Doug was fighting....Yet few readers were willing to acknowledge that the content of Doug's book made such a neutral point or that Doug's own presentation of his point of view was that coldly scientific".

Graham Cleverley in Managers & Magic (Longman's, 1971) comments: "...he coined the two terms Theory X and theory Y and used them to label two sets of beliefs a manager might hold about the origins of human behaviour. He pointed out that the manager's own behaviour would be largely determined by the particular beliefs that he subscribed to....McGregor hoped that his book would lead managers to investigate the two sets of beliefs, invent others, test out the assumptions underlying them, and develop managerial strategies that made sense in terms of those tested views of reality. "But that isn't what happened. Instead McGregor was interpreted as advocating Theory Y as a new and superior ethic – a set of moral values that ought to replace the values managers usually accept."

The Human Side of Enterprise was voted the fourth most influential management book of the 20th century in a poll of the Fellows of the Academy of Management.

== Research interests ==
McGregor's research focused on managerial leadership and the ways in which employees are affected by the management styles of their superiors. His 1960 book The Human Side of Enterprise focused on theory X and theory Y approaches to leadership. His 1967 book The Professional Manager built upon the ideas presented in his first book, along with providing behavioral, social, and psychological aspects implications of the previous ideas.

== Personal life ==
He got married at age 19. McGregor was very close to Abraham Maslow. In class, he had a very relaxed teaching style which led his students to enjoy his classes. He would often put his feet up on the desk and lecture at the same time. In 1964, McGregor died at the age of 58 in Massachusetts.

== Legacy ==
Since the mid-1950s, Procter & Gamble used Theory X and Theory Y to set up plants in Augusta, Georgia, even hiring McGregor to help. Warren Bennis, leadership expert, researcher, author, and educator, said of McGregor, "Just as every economist, knowingly or not, pays his dues to Keynes, we are all, one way or another, disciples of McGregor."

In 1964, the School of Adult and Experiential Learning at Antioch College was renamed the "McGregor School" in his honor. It was later renamed "Antioch University McGregor" and then "Antioch University Midwest." The Douglas McGregor Memorial Award was founded in 1966 in McGregor's honor to recognize a leading paper published in The Journal of Applied Behavioral Science.

== See also ==
- Maintenance actions
