= Shared leadership =

Style of leadership that distributes responsibility

Shared leadership is a leadership style that broadly distributes leadership responsibility, such that people within a team and organization lead each other. It has frequently been compared to horizontal leadership, distributed leadership, and collective leadership and is most contrasted with more traditional "vertical" or "hierarchical" leadership that resides predominantly with an individual instead of a group.

== Definitions ==
Shared leadership can be defined in a number of ways, but all definitions describe a similar phenomenon: team leadership by more than just an appointed leader. Below are examples from researchers in this field:

- Yukl (1989): "Individual members of a team engaging in activities that influence the team and other team members."
- Pearce and Sims (2001): "Leadership that emanates from members of teams, and not simply from the appointed leader."
- Pearce and Conger (2003): "A dynamic, interactive influence process among individuals and groups for which the objective is to lead one another to the achievement of group or organizational goals or both." They also added that "this influence process often involves peer, or lateral, influence and at other times involves upward or downward hierarchical influence".
- Carson, Tesluck, and Marrone (2007): "An emergent team property that results from the distribution of leadership influence across multiple team members."
- Bergman, Rentsch, Small, Davenport, and Bergman (2012): "Shared leadership occurs when two or more members engage in the leadership of the team in an effort to influence and direct fellow members to maximize team effectiveness."
- Hoch, J. E. (2013): "Reflects a situation where multiple team members engage in leadership and is characterized by collaborative decision-making and shared responsibility for outcomes."

Shared leadership is also commonly thought of as the "serial emergence" of multiple leaders over the life of a team, stemming from interactions among team members in which at least one team member tries to influence other members or the team in general. While the definition clearly has several variants, they all make the fundamental distinction between shared leadership and more traditional notions of hierarchical leadership. As Pearce, Manz and Sims (2009) summarize, all definitions of shared leadership consistently include a "process of influence" that is "built upon more than just downward influence on subordinates or followers by an appointed or elected leader." Nearly all concepts of shared leadership entail the practice of "broadly sharing power and influence among a set of individuals rather than centralizing it in the hands of a single individual who acts in the clear role of a dominant superior." Therefore, shared leadership is an emergent team property of mutual influence and shared responsibility among team members, whereby they lead each other toward goal achievement. It differs from team leadership, team processes and team work in that shared leadership describes a set of cooperatively oriented cognitions, attitudes, and actions through which team members convert member inputs to team outputs.

== Background ==
Though a relatively new phenomenon in the literature, the concept of shared leadership can actually be traced back several centuries. In a 2002 paper, David Sally noted that shared leadership was present even in the early days of Republican Rome. Indeed, during those ancient times, Rome "had a successful system of co-leadership that lasted for over four centuries. This structure of co-leadership was so effective that it extended from the lower levels of the Roman magistracy to the very top position, that of consul." (Sally, 2002) Despite such early iterations of the practice, however, most of the scholarly work on leadership has still been predominantly focused on the study of leadership in its hierarchical form. Leadership is conceived around a single individual – the leader – and how that person inspires, entices, commands, cajoles and controls followers. Research on shared leadership instead departs from the notion that leadership may well be studied as a collective phenomenon, as activities involving several individuals beyond the formally appointed manager.

There are some earlier conceptualizations of shared leadership. In 1924, Mary Parker Follet wrote that "one should not only look to the designated leader, but one should let logic dictate to whom one should look for guidance" (as cited by Crainer, 2002, p. 72). Along similar lines, Gibb, in 1954, wrote that, "Leadership is probably best conceived as a group quality, as a set of functions which must be carried out by the group." Despite these early nods toward group leadership, the formalized construct of shared leadership did not become more developed and experimentally explored until recently. Current research suggest that shared leadership forms may imply significant advantages at individual-, team-, organizational- and societal levels.

The shift in this scholarly paradigm might partly be explained by looking at the rise of studies on teamwork. Teamwork is becoming increasingly important in the workplace literature as many organizations recognize the benefits that teamwork can bring. Thus, organizations consider it important to investigate team effectiveness and the elements that increase this. Leaders have been pointed to as critical factors in team performance and effectiveness; some have even gone as far as to say they the most important ingredient for team effectiveness. Additionally, problems associated with team leaders are often cited as the primary reason for failures of work involving teams.

With the complexity and ambiguity of tasks that teams often experience, it is becoming more apparent that a single leader is unlikely to have all of the skills and traits to effectively perform the necessary leadership functions. Shared leadership has been identified as the optimal model of leadership when the knowledge characteristics of interdependence, creativity, and complexity are encountered. Thus, shared leadership is becoming increasingly popular in teams, as multiple team members emerge as leaders, especially when they have the skills/knowledge/expertise that the team needs.

== Measuring ==
There are two main ways that most researchers measure the existence and extent of shared leadership in a team: Ratings of the team's collective leadership behavior and Social Network Analysis. A less common technique of measuring shared leadership is with the use of behaviorally anchored rating scales.

=== Ratings of team's collective leadership behavior ===
Many studies measure shared leadership as team member perceptions of leader behavior exhibited by respective team leaders and team members. Often this is done by distributing leader behavior questionnaires (surveys aimed at measuring the existence and frequency of different leader behaviors) to all members of a team. Team members are instructed to fill these out once for the appointed leader and then again for all other team members. Although this allows leadership quantity to be assessed, it does not pinpoint how many other team members are engaging in leadership behaviors or how many members are looking to the same people for leadership.

=== Social network analysis ===
Social network analysis (SNA) addresses some of the flaws of collective leader behavior ratings by assessing the patterns of connections that emerge in a team and providing a method for modeling both vertical and shared leadership within a team. SNA examines the relationships that form between individuals and uses these relationships as the units of analysis. In the leadership domain, a relationship, or "tie" as it is referred to in SNA literature, occurs when one team member perceives another as exerting leadership influence on the team. The proportion of actual ties that exist in a team to all potential ties that could have emerged in a team is called network density and can be used as a measure of shared leadership.

Some researchers go further into SNA and analyze a network's centralization, which helps assess the distribution of leadership, as well as the quantity. Network centralization is measured using centrality values that are calculated for each individual. A centrality value for an individual represents the number of connections that individual has with others. The sum of the differences between the maximum individual centrality value and every other individual centrality value, divided by the maximum possible sum of differences, produces a measure of network centralization between 0 and 1, which describes the extent to which connections are concentrated around one individual, or if multiple individuals are central to the leadership network.

A shared leadership network can be further separated into distributed-coordinated or distributed-fragmented by SNA. This distinction depends on whether the formal and emergent leaders in a network recognize each other as leaders and are able to coordinate and lead together efficiently.

=== Behaviorally anchored rating scales (BARS) ===
Some studies have sought to measure shared leadership through observations of actual leadership behaviors. Behaviorally anchored rating scales (BARS) are commonly used to assess and rate performances, and can be developed to assess different leadership behaviors. Bergman et al. (2012), for example, developed such a scale and had trained raters watch videotapes of team interactions and rate each team member's behavior in terms of the dimensions on the BARS. They then operationalized shared leadership as the number of members who performed leadership behaviors, as well as the amount of leadership behavior exhibited by the team (calculated by aggregating the leadership ratings for each team member to the team level).

There are advantages and disadvantages to each measurement technique. Although all are attempting to measure the same phenomenon and all have been used in published studies, the particular measure that a researcher uses can impact his or her results.

== Antecedents: internal and external conditions ==
A host of scholars who have studied shared leadership found that in order for the dynamic to properly emerge, two preconditions must be met. First, team members must actually be willing to extend their feedback to the team in a way that aims to influence and motivate the direction of the group. Second, the team must overall be disposed to accept and rely on such feedback by other team members. The preconditions specified by Katz and Kahn (1978) tend to be met by leadership sharing in teams by the development of interpersonal alliances (measured by LMX-TEAM) between and among participants as several meta-analyses reported. Carson et al. (2007) expanded these two requirements by describing them in a larger, two-part framework that includes the degree to which a strong internal team environment exists and the extent to which positive external team coaching occurs.

=== Internal team environment ===
Carson et al. (2007) propose first that shared leadership is facilitated by an overall team environment that consists of three dimensions: shared purpose, social support, and voice. The three concepts are also drawn from a wide body of literature:

- Shared purpose prevails when team members have similar understandings of their team's main objectives and take steps to ensure a focus on collective goals.
- Social support is the extent to which team members actively provide emotional and psychological strength to one another. This may occur through overt acts of encouragement or expressed recognition of other team members' contributions and accomplishments.
- Voice is the degree to which a team's members have input into how the team carries out its purpose.

The three dimensions are interrelated and mutually reinforcing, thereby "representing a high order construct." Carson et al. summarize the interconnectivity of these three concepts in a concise narrative: When team members are able to speak up and get involved (voice), the likelihood that many of them will exercise leadership increases greatly. The opportunity for voice also facilitates shared leadership by strengthening both a common sense of direction and the potential for positive interpersonal support in a team. When teams are focused on collective goals (shared purpose), there is a greater sense of meaning and increased motivation for team members to both speak up and invest themselves in providing leadership to the team and to respond to the leadership of others. The motivation to participate and provide input toward achieving common goals and a common purpose can also be reinforced by an encouraging and supportive climate. When team members feel recognized and supported within their team (social support) they are more willing to share responsibility, cooperate, and commit to the team's collective goals. Thus, these three dimensions work together to create an internal team environment that is characterized by a shared understanding about purpose and goals, a sense of recognition and importance, and high levels of involvement, challenge, and cooperation.

=== External team coaching ===
Scholars have also described the important role that external team leaders and support can have in the development of shared leadership. When framing this dynamic or antecedent, scholars have stressed the importance of external coaching behaviors. One scholar defines these coaching behaviors as: "direct interaction with a team intended to help team members make coordinated and task-appropriate use of their collective resources in accomplishing the team's task." Researchers have identified two types of team coaching—distinguishing between those that reinforce shared leadership (supportive coaching) and those that focus on identifying team problems through task interventions (functional approach). Through supportive coaching, external team managers can reinforce the development of shared leadership in a variety of ways. Through active encouragement and positive reinforcement of team members who demonstrate leadership, coaching can foster independence and a sense of self-competence nurtures among team members. Coaching can also nurture collective commitment to the team and its objectives, a shared promise that can reduce free riding and increase the possibility that team members will demonstrate personal initiative.

A second, more indirect, way that external coaching may positively encourage shared leadership is based on a functional approach. Within this approach, the role of an external team leader is to do whatever is not being adequately managed by the team itself, to "intervene on behalf of an incomplete task." This functional coaching can be redundant when teams have highly supportive internal environments and therefore are less critical to the overall development of shared leadership. When interventions are necessary, however, such as when teams lack a strong shared purpose, the functional approach asserts that this kind of external influence may be particularly important. In this sense, the functional approach can be understood as providing "motivational and consultative functions that enable shared leadership but have not been adequately developed by the team internally."

== Effects ==
Though there is an ongoing debate about the existence and importance of shared leadership, many studies have shown that shared leadership is a significant predictor for various team processes.

=== Team effectiveness/performance ===
A commonly explored consequence of shared leadership is team effectiveness or team performance, which can be measured either by self-reports of team members or by outsider ratings, such as supervisor or client ratings. Performance is also sometimes measured more objectively, by using a commonly agreed-upon scale or rubric to rate the execution of a task. Many studies have found a positive relationship between shared leadership and team effectiveness and performance. Similarly, other studies have explored the extent to which shared leadership can predict a team's effectiveness or performance, and have found that it is a significant predictor—often a better predictor than vertical leadership. A meta-analysis by Nicolaides and colleagues (2014) found that one reason why shared leadership relates to performance is through increasing team confidence. The researchers also found that shared leadership contributed to performance, over and above the effects of vertical leadership.

The causes for this positive effect on team effectiveness lie in feeling empowered through the perceived responsibility and self-control in the context of shared leadership. This results in more engagement of the team members, more team cohesion, trust, a higher level of consensus and satisfaction.

As discussed in the measurement section of this article, the technique used to measure shared leadership can influence the results that are found. For example, Mehra et al. (2006) first compared teams with a distributed (shared) leadership structure to teams with a more traditional (vertical) leadership structure. In contrast to other studies, they did not find that teams with shared leadership outperformed the traditional teams. However, when they separated the distributed teams into distributed-coordinated and distributed-fragmented (see measures section), they found that distributed-coordinated team structures were associated with higher performance than both traditional leader-centered teams and distributed-fragmented leadership networks. Thus, they theorized, having more leaders is not the only factor that matters to team performance; rather, leaders must recognize other leaders as such in order for them to contribute positively to team effectiveness.

=== Number and types of leadership ===
Not surprisingly, shared leadership has been shown to increase the number and types of leadership (for example, transformational leadership; transactional leadership; and consideration and initiating structure).· Shared leadership enables team members to express their different abilities, thus letting members of a team exhibit different leadership behaviors. Bergman et al. (2012) found that teams did, in fact, experience more types of leadership behaviors when multiple members of the team participated in the team's leadership. Additionally, they found that each leader only effectively engaged in one type of leadership, indicating that shared leadership lets more leadership behaviors be expressed than vertical leadership.

=== In schools ===
The effect of shared leadership at school is contingent on the key players involved and how they view their missions. Conflicting thoughts on how shared leadership influences student engagement result in a variety of interpretations by researchers. Sharing leadership also impacts how teachers interact with one another, whether they possess relationships where they reinforce one another or feel distant from the organization.

One view is that sharing leadership among more people does not necessarily bring positive student outcomes. Some researchers have called the influence of shared leadership into question, suggesting that the influence of shared leadership is statistically non-significant (Leithwood & Jantzi, 1999), and indicating that shared leadership is "not a significant factor for students' participation in or engagement with school" (Silins et al., 2002). Timperley (2005, p. 417) also underlines the significance of promoting the quality of shared leadership activities, emphasizing that shared leadership has risks associated with "greater distribution of incompetence."

Conversely, it has been argued that shared leadership is positively related to students' achievement. In addition, shared leadership enables teachers to employ certain methodologies or instructional content. Leithwood and Mascall(2008) conclude that shared leadership eventually influences students' math achievement indirectly by effecting teacher motivation. Similarly, a study by Heck and Hallinger(2009) shows that the development of school shared leadership has an indirect impact on students' academic growth in math, mutually reinforcing academic capacity of teachers and students over time. Researchers and writers, such as Camburn and Han(2009), have also remarked that widespread leadership promotes teachers exposure to plentiful instructional resources and the likelihood that they will employ these instruction practices. Camburn and Han's study (2009), however, does not present empirical evidence that shared leadership is associated with students' outcomes.

Other research focused on the impact of shared leadership notes the teacher perceptions. Work by Hulpia and Devos (2010) reveals that leadership practices such as the sharing of leadership roles, social interaction, cooperation of the leadership team, and inclusive decision-making, positively reinforce teachers' commitment to the organization. It has been underscored that teachers' academic optimism, which refer to trust, teacher efficacy, and organizational citizenship behavior as well, are heavily and positively associated with planned approaches to leadership distribution (Mascall et al., 2008)

== Moderators ==
=== Shared Leadership and Team Effectiveness ===
==== Type of leadership ====
There are three different types of contents of shared leadership, namely shared traditional leadership, shared new-genre leadership and cumulative, overall leadership, which Wang, Waldman and Zhang (2014) included in a meta-analysis of 42 independent samples to test how these types of shared leadership moderate the relationship of shared leadership and team effectiveness. Shared traditional leadership refers to a task-oriented, transactional form of leadership, which emphasizes maintaining the status quo. Shared new-genre leadership however focuses on transformational leadership and therefore a more inspirational, visionary, growth and change-oriented kind of leadership. Lastly, cumulative, overall leadership was assessed based on individual members’ ratings of leadership influence for each of his/her peers.

The studies showed that both shared new-genre leadership and cumulative, overall shared leadership show a stronger relationship with team effectiveness than shared traditional leadership.

==== Work complexity ====
Work complexity (also known as job complexity) acts as a moderator of the shared leadership-team effectiveness relationship, namely that the relationship is stronger when work is more complex compared with when it is less complex. This can be explained by the higher interdependence, coordination and information sharing that is necessary when work complexity is high.

== Implications and further research directions ==
Scholars have pointed to 4 main areas in shared leadership that need more research:

1. Events that generate shared leadership
2. Facilitation factors
3. Most conducive influence approaches
4. Stages and life cycles in shared leadership settings (Carson et al., 2007; Pearce and Conger, 2002).

Additionally, more scholarship must be done on outcomes of shared leadership. The spike of recent scholarship in this field does indicate that scholars increasingly understand the significance of shared leadership as organizations in the field are also increasingly capitalizing on the many benefits a shared leadership approach can offer.

== See also ==
- Collaborative leadership
- Directorial system
- Group development
- Group dynamics
- Human resources
- Leadership development
- Leadership studies
- Organizational development
- Team building
- Team composition
- Three levels of leadership model
- Trait leadership
