= Senior management =

Individuals at the highest level of organizational management

Senior management, executive management, or upper management is an occupation at the highest level of management of an organization, performed by individuals who have the day-to-day tasks of managing the organization, sometimes a company or a corporation.

== Overview ==
Executive managers hold executive powers delegated to them with and by authority of a board of directors and/or the shareholders. Generally, higher levels of responsibility exist, such as a board of directors and those who own the company (shareholders), but they focus on managing the senior or executive management instead of on the day-to-day activities of the business. The executive management typically consists of the heads of a firm's product and/or geographic units and of functional executives such as the chief financial officer, the chief operating officer, and the chief strategy officer. In project management, senior management authorises the funding of projects.

Senior management are sometimes referred to, within corporations, as executive management, top management, upper management, higher management, or simply seniors.

== Top management ==
A top management is a specific form of which typically consists of some of the top managers in a firm. However, there is no clear definition to what the top management of an organization is. It is put together by the chief executive officer (CEO) to work on a specific task. In working on this task, it generally has a much higher responsibility and higher autonomy than other types of teams.

Possible tasks include:

- ensuring the organization is effective and successful by taking on responsibility for the implementation of an appropriate strategy that the organization can adapt to,
- effectively managing the demands of stakeholders,
- giving clear definitions of what constitutes effectiveness and success,
- ensuring the implementation of the strategy and the targeting of resources towards success,
- reviewing if their actions are relevant to the organization's overall goals.

The way top management is put together and work together as a team can greatly differ from other teams. This is mainly based on the fact that top managers have succeeded as individuals which often leads to a focus on functional team objectives rather than to working interdependently on a shared goal. Top management consist of top managers from different functional areas of the firm, so they usually have different areas of expertise. Diversity and heterogeneity in teams can have a positive effect on teamwork. Nevertheless, there are also negative effects which have to be overcome as a team, such as not valuing different opinions and perspectives. A CEO that models valuing behavior and ensures the team has both a clear purpose and clear objectives can do that. This also reduces social categorization effects because it leads to team members focusing more on their shared goals than on their differences.

The exchange of information during the working process is as important for top managements as it is for all other kinds of teams. In order to work effectively, the team needs to understand how to communicate, share information, set goals, give feedback, manage conflict, engage in joint planning and task coordination and solve problems collaboratively. The CEO plays a key role in enabling the team to do so. The CEO must take on the responsibility to coach the team and to reflect on their work. In their research in 2005, Simsek and colleagues found that especially a CEO's collectivistic orientation has a positive influence on team work behavior. Collectivistic orientation means that the CEO subordinates his or her personal to the group interests and goals, emphasizes sharing and cooperation within the team and enhances task-relevant processes of teamwork like gathering, processing and interpreting strategic information. This in turn enhances a process called behavioral integration which was developed by Hambrick (1994). It describes the degree to which a group, here the top management, engages in mutual and collective interaction.

Hambrick divided this concept into three parts:

1. The level of collaborative behavior within the team
2. The quantity and quality of exchanged information
3. The emphasis on joint decision making

Top managements can face multiple difficulties which mainly derive from their individualistic views and strong opinions. It is therefore of great importance that the team works through these conflicts, creating a climate of safety, keeping their vision and mission in mind and build an appropriate work environment for themselves and the organization.

== See also ==
- Business school
- Corporate titles
- Executive education
- Line management
- Middle management
