= American Institute for Managing Diversity =

American diversity think tank

- Formation: January 1, 1984; 42 years ago
- Founders: R. Roosevelt Thomas Jr.
- Type: Managing diversity think tank, research institute, educational organization, and consulting firm
- Legal status: Nonprofit corporation
- Purpose: Workplace Diversity; Research and development
- Headquarters: Atlanta, Georgia, U.S.
- Region served: Global
- Affiliations: Morehouse College
- Website: www.aimd.org (defunct)

The American Institute for Managing Diversity (AIMD) was an American nonprofit diversity think tank and educational institute. Founded in 1984, by the “guru of diversity theory” R. Roosevelt Thomas, Jr. (1944–2013), AIMD was the first national nonprofit organization in the United States to research and study workplace diversity, and the leading nonprofit think tank dedicated to furthering the field of diversity management. Thomas died in 2013, and AIMD ceased operations.

== History ==
In 1983, a white corporate manager asked R. Roosevelt Thomas Jr., a former professor and dean of the business school at Clark Atlanta University, a historically black institution, for advice on how to manage his Black employees. Thomas, who was an alumnus of University of Chicago and Harvard business schools, did not believe that Black employees needed special attention nor supervision.

In 1984, Thomas approached his undergraduate alma mater, Morehouse College, and asked them to partner with him to build an institute that would study “managing diversity,” a term that refers to the changing demographics of organizations; in the 1980s, more white male managers were managing more women and ethnic minority employees, and more women and ethnic minority managers were managing white male employees. The American Institute for Managing Diversity (AIMD)'s first offices were located on the ground floor of a Morehouse administration building, although AIMD was technically not affiliated with the college. AIMD did not pay rent for its office space at the college. In addition to his role at AIMD, Thomas was selected as Secretary of Morehouse in 1988.

The organization's founding mission was to advance the field of diversity and to expand the practice of managing diversity with the goal of “shaping global policy and expanding critical consciousness.” In its early years, AIMD received major funding from Avon Products, CBS, Dayton Hudson, Equitable, and Quaker Oats foundations. Bell Communications Research and Coca-Cola Company were some of the first supporters of AIMD's management consulting team and financial audit capabilities. AIMD believed that managing diversity was a belief, a philosophy, a way of managing change.

AIMD had a goal to become the repository of scholarship for the field of diversity. AIMD maintained a research library; hosted research fellows and visiting scholars; and prepared and delivered working papers, magazine articles, books, videos, electronic information services, post-secondary undergraduate and graduate curricula, a monthly newsletter, “Research Notes,” and a quarterly journal, “Translational Journal of Diversity Studies.” AIMD advanced diversity thought leadership through its research, education and public outreach programs. The organization hosted educational seminars, planning sessions, symposium, and workshops for business professionals, academic researchers, organizational consultants, and others interested in managing diversity. AIMD developed the “cultural audit” process and delivery systems, a diversity management tool. AIMD was the source of pioneering issues and cutting-edge perspectives on diversity and diversity management.

In 1987, the Hudson Institute released a report, “Work Force 2000,” that supported AIMD's research; the 21st century workforce would consist of more diverse workers from more diverse backgrounds and for organizations to remain competitive their leaders would have to learn how to manage diversity.

In 1991, AIMD created a for-profit consulting firm, Diversity Consulting, Inc. A year later, the consulting group was sold to Towers Perrin for an undisclosed amount.

In 1995, AIMD hosted a global conference on managing diversity, “At the Frontiers of Managing Diversity: Integrating Practice and Research” at the Georgia Center for Continuing Education in Athens, Georgia. The conference attracted business executives, academic researchers, and diversity scholars from the U.S., Canada, Europe and Africa.

In 2009, AIMD conducted a published study of cross-generational mentoring programs in organizations. AIMD determined that organizational mentoring programs are successful when they have a strong purpose and a culture that values mentoring.

== AIMD Alliance with Diversity Collegium ==
In 1991, seven pioneering diversity professionals established the "Diversity Collegium" to advance the field of diversity. In 2003, AIMD formed a partnership with the Diversity Collegium, referred to as "The Alliance," to research and study common terms and language for the field of diversity. The Alliance and its members are credited with expanding the definition of workplace diversity beyond race and gender to include religion, sexual orientation, physical disabilities, family background, organizational newcomers and old-timers, functional backgrounds, union and non-union workers, exempt and non and non-exempt workers, ways of living, and others. In 2006, The Alliance co-hosted, “The World is Flat: Implications for Diversity Management” forum at Kraft Foods’ world headquarters in Glenview, Illinois. Kraft, Tyson Foods, and Weyerhauser sponsored the forum that involved leading academics, business executives, and diversity practitioners to discuss the relationship between a changing world and the implied flatness of managing diversity.

== Diversity Leadership Academy ==
In 2000, The Coca-Cola Company donated $1.5 million to AIMD for the creation of the Diversity Leadership Academy (DLA) of Atlanta, “a leadership development program for executive level business and community leaders.” This partnership was announced after Coca-Cola settled a lawsuit for more than $192 million that was filed by Black employees who alleged employment discrimination. Coca-Cola executive Juan Johnson, an African-American, served as the first president of DLA Atlanta.

DLA Atlanta served as a model for other AIMD Diversity Leadership academies. In 2003, AIMD hosted a DLA in Indianapolis, Indiana, and in 2008, a five-month DLA training session in Charleston, West Virginia. For the tenth anniversary of DLA Atlanta, AIMD announced that 300 professionals had graduated from the Atlanta program, and more than 1,200 executives nationwide had participated in an AIMD diversity leadership academy.

== Major research partners and clients ==
AIMD was first nonprofit organization in the United States to advise Fortune 500 companies and large institutions on managing diversity. Some of the “pioneering managing diversity companies” included Amoco, Avon Products, Great Rivers Girl Scout Council, Procter & Gamble, and Union Pacific.

AIMD worked with Avon Products to develop diversity training programs. One of those programs gave Black and Hispanic managers more authority over under-performing inner-city markets, resulting in those markets becoming some of the most profitable in the company.

In 1988, AIMD advised Quaker Oats on workplace diversity issues, including employee advancement for women and ethnic minorities.

Throughout its history, AIMD consulted and provided research for several corporations and large organizations. The following is a partial list.

- Aetna
- American Airlines
- American Red Cross, Atlanta
- American Transtech
- Amoco
- ASHA
- AT&T
- Avon Products
- Bell Communications Research
- CBS
- Centers for Disease Control
- Coca-Cola Company
- Control Data Corporation
- Dayton Hudson
- Defense Information Systems Agency
- EDS
- Equitable
- Exxon
- Fannie Mae
- Federal Reserve Bank
- Ford Motor
- Goodyear Tire and Rubber
- Great Rivers Girl Scout Council
- Greater Leadership, Hartford, Connecticut
- Hallmark Cards
- Hartford Insurance
- Hoecht Celanese
- Household Finance
- Hughes Aircraft
- IBM
- Indiana University
- Junior Achievement
- Kent State University
- Lawrence Livermore Labs
- Metropolitan State College of Denver
- PG&E
- Procter & Gamble
- Quaker Oats
- Regional Rehabilitation Education Program
- Saint Paul Companies
- Salomon Brothers
- SmithKline Beecham
- Tennessee Valley Authority
- Texas Instruments
- Union Pacific
- University of Michigan
- Upjohn Company
- United States Army Corps of Engineers
- United States Bureau of Reclamation
- United States Defense Mapping Agency
- United States Department of Agriculture
- United States Department of Labor Glass Ceiling Commission
- United States Environmental Protection Agency
- United States Forest Service
- United States Internal Revenue Service
- United States Postal Service
- The Weather Channel
- Weyerhaeuser
- Wilderness Society
- YWCA National Board

== Leadership ==
The following is a partial list of former AIMD administrators, research fellows, educators, senior executives, and board directors.

=== Administration ===
- Pamela Arnold, former president and diversity columnist (2011-)
- Melanie Harrington, former president (- 2011)
- Teresa (Terri) Kruzan, former executive director and senior research fellow
- Shirley Manor
- Sharon Parker, former president (1997–2000)
- R. Roosevelt Thomas, Jr., founder and president
- Lexie Walker
- Glenda Westbrook, former executive director

=== Research and education ===
- Pamela Arnold, diversity columnist and former president
- Robert Davis, advocacy partner
- Debra Francis, program coordinator
- Toni A. Gregory, Ed.D. (1947–2013), director of research (1993–1996)
- Maureen Hunter, education director
- John D. Hutcheson, Jr., Ph.D., senior research associate
- Marshall Kaufman, Ed.D., educator, research director, and advocacy partner (1994–1997)
- Teresa Kruzan, senior research fellow and former executive director
- Kathy Lee, educator
- Catherine A. Ouellette, research associate
- Linda G. Owens, Ph.D., educator
- Jeff Porterfield, research associate
- Lynne Simpson Scott, technical researcher
- R. Roosevelt Thomas, Jr., founder and president
- Wayne Wormely, Ph.D., educator

=== Board of Directors ===
- Wayne Anderson, Amoco
- Ramani Ayer, Hartford Specialty
- John Boyd, Rich's Department Stores
- William Brooks, General Motors
- Edwin T. Bryant, Towers Perrin
- Daisy Chin-Lor
- Ralph Cleveland (board chair, 2011-), AGL Resources
- Beverly Freeman, The Coca-Cola Company
- Jack Gabarro, Harvard University
- Francis Guess, Guess & Co.
- Leonade Jones, Washington Post Company
- Malcom A. Kessinger, Union Carbide
- Jack Koraleski, Union Pacific
- Charles M. Langston, Hoechst Celanese
- John Latham (board chair, 2008–2011), Alston Bird
- Paul Lawrence, Harvard Business School
- Worth Loomis, The Hartford Seminary
- H. Paul McCowatt, CBS
- William Mossett, SmithKline Beecham
- James Preston, Avon
- Joan Schneider, Salomon Brothers
- Betty Siegel, Kennesaw State
- Robin Sternbergh, IBM
- Gwen Taylor, Bellcore
- Jerald M. Wigdortz, Lehman Brothers
- Edwin Wingate, Dayton Hudson
- Marcia Worthing, Avon Products

== Awards and honors ==
- 2000—Martin Luther King Jr. Community Service Award, Rollins School of Public Health, Emory University

== Publications and articles ==
- Arnold, Pamela, and Terri Kruzan (June 12, 2012). "Organizational Culture Roadblocks & Shortcuts for Leveraging Diversity: Part I." Profiles in Diversity Journal.
- Davis, Robert L. “Steps in a Managing Diversity Process.” American Institute for Managing Diversity, Inc.
- Diversity Group, The. “Managing Diversity: Developing a Conceptual Framework." American Institute for Managing Diversity, Inc.
- Global Conference on Managing Diversity At The Frontier of Managing Diversity: Integrating Practice and Research (on disk). Athens, GA: The American Institute for Managing Diversity, Sept. 7–9, 1995.
- Hucheson, John D., Jr. and Terri W Kruzan (2003). A guide to culture audits: Analyzing organizational culture for managing diversity, American Institute of Managing Diversity, Atlanta, GA.
- Hutcheson, John D., Jr. (with Terri Kruzan) (1998). Analyzing Organizational Culture for Managing Diversity: A Guide to Culture Audits, Atlanta: American Institute for Managing Diversity, 1998.
- Thomas, Roosevelt et al. (1994). “Impact of Recruitment, Selection, and Compensation Policies and Practices on the Glass Ceiling.” Morehouse College. Paper prepared for the Glass Ceiling Commission.
- Thomas, Roosevelt R., Jr. (2002). The Giraffe and Elephant: A Diversity Fable. American Institute for Managing Diversity, Inc.
- Thomas, Roosevelt R., Jr. “Total Quality Managing Diversity: Keys to Competitive Advantage in the 1990s.” American Institute for Managing Diversity, Inc.
- Thomas, Roosevelt R., Jr. and Toni A. Gregory. “A Diversity Perspective. The Language Challenge.” American Institute for Managing Diversity, Inc.
- Thomas, Roosevelt R., Jr., with Tracy Gray and Marjorie Woodruff (1992). Differences Do Make a Difference. American Institute for Managing Diversity, Inc.

== See also ==
- Affirmative action
- Ageism
- Diversity (politics)
- Diversity, equity, and inclusion
- Functional diversity (organizational)
- Reverse discrimination
- Women in the workforce
