= Team diversity =

Differences between members of a team

Team diversity refers to the differences between individual members of a team that can exist on various dimensions like age, nationality, religious background, functional background or task skills, sexual orientation, and political preferences, among others. Different types of diversity include demographic, personality and functional diversity (see Team composition), and can have positive as well as negative effects on team outcomes. Diversity can impact performance, team member satisfaction or the innovative capacity of a team. According to the Input-Process-Output Model, team diversity is considered an input factor that has effects on the processes as well as on the team outputs of team work.

During the 2010s, corporate firms began to focus on unlocking the value of this diversity through many HR / recruiting programs.

== Demographic diversity ==
The demographic diversity of members of a team describes differences in observable attributes like gender, age or ethnicity. Several studies show that individuals who are different from their work team in demographic characteristics are less psychologically committed to their organizations, less satisfied and are therefore more absent from work. Other studies have shown that teams in which the age of the team members varies, people will be more likely to leave the team. Gender and culturally mixed teams tend to face intense interpersonal conflict in the beginning of their working process, which diminishes team performance (see Team Conflict). However, as teams learn to integrate their differences in background and ideas over time, they show improved team performance, creativity, and enhanced innovative thinking relative to homogenous teams.

The impacts of demographic diversity also remain contested. Despite the immense increase in focus on diverse workplaces, research on the impact of this diversity has not kept up. Out of the research that has been done, findings are still inconclusive. For example, Mannix and Neale (2005) found demographic diversity in the workplace to be associated with negative outcomes such as high employee turnover, low workforce satisfaction, intergroup / interpersonal conflicts, and perhaps most importantly, low performance. On the contrary, Giambatista and Bhappu found that the meshing of these diverse characteristics leads to more creative solutions to problems. A caveat with these positive-outcome studies is that they were conducted in synthetic, laboratory-style settings (e.g. MBA classrooms); the generalizability of these findings to apply to real work-place settings remains questionable.

== Personality diversity ==
The personality diversity of a team refers to difference in personality characteristics of the team members. Some studies found that diversity in team members' levels of extraversion and emotional stability will lead the team to a better performance. Personality diversity is also often correlated with skill diversity, even on teams that can seem very specialized and focused. This is also true in instances where personality diversity can manifest like skill diversity: forcing teams to take a step back and re-evaluate their processes and outputs.

Diversity of personality traits does not guarantee benefits to workplaces and teams. Many studies exist that focus on the role of conscientiousness and agreeableness in team members, and it is generally agreed that ranking higher on those two Big Five personality traits is good for individual as well as team output. It does not benefit organizations to seek diversity in these personality types. Additionally, there are certain personality traits that are counterproductive to workplace productivity and team cohesiveness no matter the combination of members they show up in. To the extreme, certain personality traits manifest as counterproductive workplace behaviors (CWBs) that run against the interest of the organizations they are a part of. It is beneficial to employers and organizations to screen out applicants that have personality traits that can be associated with CWBs. This includes but is not limited behavior such as: poor attendance, misuse of information, poor quality work, poor interpersonal skills.

=== Levels of extraversion ===
When examining teams in an organization, levels of extraversion are usually measured rather than introversion versus extraversion as a binary. This allows for a more accurate reading into individuals' personalities as well as accounts for the fact that individuals who rank as true introverts are unlikely to find themselves in an organization that demands team-based work. Differences in extraversion are considered "deep-level diversity," as opposed to identity markers (gender, ethnicity, etc.) that are considered "surface-level diversity." This type of deep-level diversity has been linked to increased team conflict. However, having team processes in place with this in mind has been found to moderate (if not completely mitigate) the diversity-conflict correlation that has been found. The implication here is that if you need to pull a deep-level diverse team together but are aware of it at the outset, one can include designs in the team and project structure that will account for the possibility of increased conflict that can arise from all types of diversity.

Some studies have found that extraversion diversity among team members can produce negative perceptions of the team itself as well as of individual contributions in the perspective of team leaders. This was discovered when contrasting the effect of measuring team fit and team attraction by extraversion (measure on a scale of high individual/low team to low individual/high team) versus overall personality. Increased similarity in extraversion levels lead to greater attraction to one's team; it has been repeatedly proven that increased allegiance and attraction to a team within an organization improves performance as well as the perception of their performance by colleagues and management.

=== Creativity ===
Many teams are employed within organizations not just to join skill sets (e.g. a team of specialists within a hospital) but to find a more creative solution than any individual would be able to come up with and execute on their own (see organizations like IDEO). Creativity has the particular issue of being difficult to measure and peer review simply because there can be so many particular manifestations of creativity on an individual to individual basis.

Diversity of creativity itself has not been extensively explored, perhaps for lack of real world applications. However, the effect of creativity itself on the other aspects of diversity within a team has serious implications. Cognitive diversity among members has been found to have a negative effect on intrinsic motivation among team members. However, relatively recent research has shown that this depletion of motivation is counteracted if members of the team would rate themselves highly on creativity. Note that this effect is not found for actual measured creativity, but for team members whose creative self-efficacy was on the higher end.

A large-scale meta-analysis found that diversity among team members in terms of demographic variables such as race/ethnicity, age, and sex is unrelated to team creativity and innovation. It also found that diversity in terms of job-related factors such as functional diversity, educational background diversity, and team tenure diversity is positively related to team creativity and innovation.

== Functional diversity ==
Functional diversity of team members refers to the different functional backgrounds, skills and abilities of members within a team. This increases the pool of knowledge and skills available for completing team tasks. Especially in decision-making tasks, research shows that functionally diverse teams tend to make better decisions because they hold a greater variety of perspectives (see Decision-making in Teams).

An important drawback to consider is that functionally diverse teams show greater difficulties in coordinating their efforts and in showing adequate communication patterns due to the unique set of backgrounds and skillsets present. When functional diversity threatens the group's safety (see Psychological Safety), team creativity and the implementation of innovative ideas can suffer. As such, differing skills and various work-related backgrounds need to be adequately managed and integrated for teams to be able to work together effectively and create synergies from their wide range of backgrounds (see Leading Teams).

To better understand functional diversity, it is important to consider the functional approach to decision-making. At its core, the functional perspective is defined as "a normative approach to describing and predicting group behavior and performance that focuses on the functions of inputs and/or processes." This approach makes 4 basic assumptions about groups – namely, it assumes that groups are goal-oriented, group behavior / performance varies and can be evaluated, interaction processes have utility and can be regulated, and finally that various factors, both internal and external, impact behavior / performance via various methods of interaction. This fourth assumption is key in understanding the impacts of functional diversity, as these external attributes often dominate the way team members interact with one another.

Over the last decade, corporations have tried to capitalize on this framework based on the assumption that diversity amongst teams leads to more creative solutions and accelerated innovation. Many large firms in traditional industries such as banking and finance go as far as having "Diversity Recruiting Programs," where they recruit an increasingly sizable portion of their junior employees from a pool of exclusively under-represented minorities (URM). However, studies on the true benefits of diversity remain inconclusive – for example Ancona and Caldwell (1992) found a positive relationship between functional diversity and team innovation while Keller (2001) found a negative relationship, while Somech (2006) found no relationship at all.

== Theoretical perspectives on diversity ==
Theoretical perspectives on diversity in teams have been a focus of organizational psychology since 1985. Many theories have been postulated and attempted to be tested. The fact remains that it is difficult to tease out exactly the effects of diversity in its various forms on team performance. There are few tenets that have garnered widespread consensus among researchers.

One generally agreed upon phenomenon that increased diversity in national origin or ethnicity generally hinders information use, even when that information is accessible to the team. This is due to a lack of team cohesion which starts with more surface-level identifying factors (see Group cohesiveness). However, there is evidence that this information usage trend is not linear but in fact parabolic. There is some research that indicates diverse groups have increased information-processing power that can result in a net gain of productivity.

There is research that suggests that the negative effects can be mediated if teams are managed appropriately. Research in this vein suggests that diverse teams with negative outcomes related to such might not be suffering from diversity issues but from an overall management issue. This shifts the paradigm on how to approach these organizational questions in research, whether lab-based or in the field, because it shifts the focus back to an occupational psychology and effective management standpoint.

=== Integration of the two perspectives ===
The Categorization-Elaboration-Model integrates the two approaches on diversity and proposes the theory that the information/decision making and social categorization processes interact. Most importantly, the processes are not associated with particular dimensions of diversity (e.g. gender, functional backgrounds etc.). Hence, each dimension of diversity can elicit both the elaboration of information/decision-making as well as social categorization processes, which can again have either positive or negative effects on the team outputs (e.g. performance or innovation, see Input-Process-Output-Model). According to the theory, diverse teams need to elaborate their informational diversity and avoid intergroup biases in order to positively transform their diversity into effectiveness and innovation.

== Benefits and costs to teams ==
=== Benefits ===
Different types of diversity provide different benefits. To maximize the benefit of team diversity to organizations, the exact "benefit" that an organization desires must be specified. This can be in the form of combined output, individual output, process efficiency, or something else entirely. The benefits of diversity in teams is usually sourced from organizational behavior. This is because the benefits of different team structures have been mostly studied with the discrete purpose of increasing occupational output. Benefits may arise from differing perspectives of culture, age, experience or other disparate factors.

==== Functional benefits ====
With regard to productivity, putting together teammates with different occupational backgrounds and skillsets within a structured team process has been thought to find more creative and comprehensive solutions to problems. Often, organizations will require multiple specialist skillsets to solve a problem (this is especially true in fields like medicine or manufacturing). This is an example of where the need for a diverse team already exists, so creating the framework for the team to produce its optimal output in an efficient manner is the definition of success. Often measuring the productivity benefits of team diversity can be difficult due to the many factors present in teams, especially among knowledge workers with more nebulous job descriptions.

==== Satisfaction benefits ====
Certain types of diversity, such as functional or demographic, have been linked to increased job performance as well as job satisfaction. It is currently theorized that an increase in diversity among organization members forces the standard for communication to be higher since in-group understanding is not guaranteed, and that the increased level of communication could be what increases team member satisfaction. However, this is yet to be proven definitively causal.

=== Costs ===
While diversity, in theory, can promote a wide range of ideas originating from people from different backgrounds, it is not always the case that diversity improves a group's functioning. Different types of diversity have widely different effects on team satisfaction and functioning.

==== Demographic diversity ====
Increased demographic diversity has frequently been linked to increased task-based conflict and personality conflict. While this sometimes can be mediated by applying concepts of organizational behavior, this usually results in a net loss in productivity. However, if this net loss is minimized, the loss of productivity is often considered a cost of doing business by organizations that are trying to encourage fairness in hiring. Often small process losses are considered better than the alternative, which is the potential for poor public relations and angry shareholders due to a less diverse organization.

==== Personality diversity ====
Personality diversity offers the most clear-cut examples of diversity that can negatively impact a team. Differences in levels of extraversion or neuroticism can deeply cut into productivity with process losses as well as personality conflicts. In agreement with various social categorization and attraction theories, the evidence strongly suggests that this type of diversity is typically more of an obstacle to a group's functioning and performance. This will not come as a shock to most organizations, as it has been the consensus for a long time in many areas of psychology that certain personality traits only lend themselves to counterproductive workplace behaviors. It benefits organizations that value diversity to attempt to minimize the presence of those traits across the board while pursuing other types of diversity.
