= Adaptive performance =

Adjusting to and understanding change in a workplace

Adaptive performance in the work environment refers to adjusting to and understanding change in the workplace. An employee who is versatile is valued and important in the success of an organization. Employers seek employees with high adaptability, due to the positive outcomes that follow, such as excellent work performance, work attitude, and ability to handle stress. Employees, who display high adaptive performance in an organization, tend to have more advantages in career opportunities unlike employees who are not adaptable to change. In previous literature, Pulakos and colleagues established eight dimensions of adaptive performance.

== Dimensions ==
Pulakos et al. proposed the following dimensions for adaptive performance:

- Handling emergencies and crisis situations: making quick decisions when faced with an emergency.
- Handling stress in the workforce: keeping composed and focused on task at hand when dealing with high demand tasks
- Creative problem solving: thinking outside the boundary limits, and innovatively to solve a problem.
- Dealing with uncertain and unpredictable work situations: able to become productive despite the occurrence of unknown situations.
- Learning and manipulating new technology, task, and procedures: approach new methods and technological constructs in order to accomplish a work task.
- Demonstrating interpersonal adaptability: being considerate of other people's points of view when working in a team to accomplish a certain goal.
- Demonstrating cultural adaptability: being respectful and considerate of different cultural backgrounds.
- Demonstrating physically oriented adaptability: physically adjusting one's self to better fit the surrounding environment.

== Measurement ==
Pulakos et al. developed a scale for adaptive performance based on their eight-dimension model. This scale, the Job Adaptability Inventory (JAI), contains 132 questions (15 – 18 questions per dimension). Another similar tool is the I-ADAPT measure (I-ADAPT-M) developed by Ployhart and Bliese, based on their I-ADAPT theory. They focused on adaptability as a personality-like trait which describes individual's ability to adapt to organizational changes. Therefore, there is a difference between I-ADAPT-M and the JAI which measures adaptive performance as behaviors. The I-ADAPT-M also has eight dimensions (crisis adaptability, stress adaptability, creative adaptability, uncertain adaptability, learning adaptability, interpersonal adaptability, cultural adaptability, and physical adaptability), with 5 items for every dimension.

== Predictors ==
Several predictors of adaptive performance have been examined systematically, including cognitive abilities, Big Five personality traits, and goal orientation. According to the meta-analytic evidence, cognitive abilities promote adaptive performance. Cognitive abilities are particularly important when dealing with complex dynamic tasks. Other examined antecedences of adaptive performance seem to be less important than cognitive abilities. To illustrate, personality traits like Big Five are weakly related to adaptive performance. Only emotional stability and conscientiousness seem to be somewhat relevant. Motivational predictors have been examined too. However, goal orientation (e.g., learning goal orientation) is only relevant when predicting subjective (e.g., self-reported) adaptive performance. Thus, goal orientation is not useful when predicting objective adaptive performance (e.g., task outcomes).

== Work stress ==
Work stress has been considered as a major factor of many work outcomes, like performance, nonproductive behavior and turnover. An employee being able to adapt to change within an organization is more focused, and able to deal with stressful situations. An employee who is unable to [absolve their strain] is unable to focus on what is occurring in the organization, such as organizational change. Not only can work stress predict adaptive performance to a considerable extent, there are also a lot of overlaps between adaptive performance and stress coping.

=== Stress appraisal ===
It has been long recognized that work stress generally has a negative effects on job performance, but there is differential influence resulting from different perceptions of stressors. When faced with a new situation, individuals would spontaneously begin to evaluate their own abilities and skills as compared with the requirements of the situation, which is referred to as stress appraisals. Such stress appraisal has two stages: primary appraisal and secondary appraisal. In the primary appraisal stage, individuals evaluate what potential threats there will be, concerning the demands from situation and the goals and values of themselves. In the secondary appraisal stage, individuals evaluate the resources they have to deal with those requirements. The results of appraisal, after two stages, are indicated to fall on a continuum between two extremes of being challenged and threatened. Challenge appraisals mean that individuals feel their resources, like abilities and social support to be abundant sufficient to fulfill requirements of the situation. Threat appraisals, on the other hand, mean that individuals are not confident about their abilities or other resources to respond to the situation demands. Threat appraisals and challenge appraisals could influence job performance distinctively. As for adaptive performance, the more challenging (i.e., the less threatening) one's stress appraisals are, the more adaptive performance he/she would have. This relationship is mediated by self-efficacy, which is a belief about one's capacities for certain tasks. Challenging rather than threatening appraisals would lead to higher levels of self-efficacy, and thus benefit individuals' adaptive performance.

=== Stress coping ===
Coping, as a form of response to stressors, describes how individuals handle stressful events. It is very close to one dimension of adaptive performance by definition (i.e., the Handling Work Stress dimension), and coping has been suggested to be another form of adaptation. However, they are still different constructions. Stress coping could be divided into several styles and strategies based on several theories. One general idea is to divide coping as active coping and avoidant coping. Active coping means to proactively address and resolve stressful events, like quitting a stressful job and changing into a less overwhelming one. Avoidant coping means to reduce stress by ignoring it, like involving in problematic drinking. Another set of coping strategy types includes problem-focused coping and emotion-focused coping. Problem-focused coping involves using skills and knowledge to deal with the cause of their problems. Emotion-focused coping involves releasing negative emotions by ways like distracting or disclaiming. Adaptive performance involves a mixture of different coping strategies. Because adaptive performance concerns positive aspects of behaviors, it is more closely related to coping strategies that have positive effects, such as active coping and problem-focused coping. Therefore, adaptive performance is more likely to contain such behaviors in stressful situations.

== Team adaptive performance ==
In addition to individual adaptive performance, psychologists are also interested in adaptive performance at team level. Team adaptive performance is defined as an emergent phenomenon that compiles over time from the unfolding of a recursive cycle whereby one or more team members use their resources to functionally change current cognitive or behavioral goal-directed action or structures to meet expected or unexpected demands. It is a multilevel phenomenon that emanates as team members and teams recursively display behavioral processes and draw on and update emergent cognitive states to engage in change. Team adaptive performance is considered as the core and proximal temporal antecedents to team adaptation, which could be seen as a change in team performance in response to a salient cue or cue stream that leads to a functional outcome for the entire team. Along with the definition of team adaptive performance, researchers came up with a four-stage model to describe the process of team adaptive performance. The four core constructs characterizing this adaptive cycle include: (1) situation assessment; (2) plan formulation; (3) plan execution, via adaptive interaction processes; and (4) team learning, as well as emergent cognitive states (i.e., shared mental models, team situational awareness, psychological safety), which serve as both proximal outcomes and inputs to this cycle. Team adaptive performance differs from individual adaptive performance from several aspects. Team adaptive performance reflects the extent to which the team meets its objectives during a transfer performance episode, whereas individual adaptive performance reflects the extent to which each member effectively executes his or her role in the team during the transfer episode. Team adaptive performance also has different antecedents compared with individual adaptive performance.

=== Predictors ===
People have identified several dispositional and contextual factors that would affect team adaptive performance. The most obvious and natural predictor of team adaptive performance is characteristics of team members, or team composition. Team composition with respect to members' cognitive ability is positively associated with team adaptive performance, with a moderation effect of team goals. Teams with difficult goals and staffed with high-performance orientation members are especially unlikely to adapt. Teams with difficult goals and staffed with high-learning orientation members are especially likely to adapt. Moreover, team members' self-leadership, conscientiousness, and attitudes could also influence team adaptive performance. Other factors are more related to interactions between team members and team environment, like team learning climate. Among them coordination of team members has been proved to be a most influential factor. Teams' ability to adapt their coordination activities to changing situational demands is crucial to team performance. A stronger increase in the teams' adaptive coordination was found to be related to better performance. Researchers have posited that the maintenance of coordinated effort and activities ("coordination maintenance") is necessary for high team adaptive performance. This is because even with well-adapted individual performance, workflow at the team level often becomes disrupted, "overflowing" in particular directions. Overflow may create excessive work demands for some team members, while encouraging social loafing among those who are in the ebb of the workflow (see social loafing). This suggests that, although team members may have their own task boundaries, and individual adaptive performance may depend on each member's individual capabilities, however to the team, each employee's adaptive performance may result in successful completion of the team task only if all activities are coordinated and synchronized in a holistic fashion. Team learning climate also displays a significant, positive relationship with team adaptive performance.

== Leadership ==
Studies show that for an individual to show leadership, they must not only perform well but the individual would need to be an adaptive learner as well. An individual who displays adaptive qualities and productivity in a team will most likely also display strong leadership characteristics. Organizations value adaptive performance in the leadership characteristics an individual possess, as it has proven to help workers maintain productivity in a dynamic work environment. For leaders to successfully perform their roles, they must be able to effectively address tasks and also be able to overcome social challenges. Adaptive performance is a critical characteristic to have when being the leader of an organization because it aids in successfully handling any workplace situations that may arise and helping an organization progress. Instead of resisting change in the workplace, a team leader with adaptive performance establishes a new behavior appropriate to the situation to shift a potential problem into a positive outcome. The correct type of leadership makes a positive change in the characteristics of a team's adaptability to assist in maintaining a healthy and positive workforce. Employees who display adaptive performance in leadership set an example for their colleagues specifically in showcasing the best way to prepare and handle adaptation in occurring organizational changes. Adaptive performance in leadership is valued by employers because an employee who displays those two characteristics tends to exemplify and motivate adaptive behavior within other individuals in the workforce.

=== Transformational leadership ===
In organizational situations where adaptability to the environment and difficult challenges occur often, an individual who possess transformational leadership is preferred. Transformational leadership is a leadership style that encourages team members to imagine new ideas of change and to take action on these ideas to help handle certain situations. This particular leadership style is commonly used in organizations, due to its positive outcomes such as higher work engagement, motivation, and creativity in employees. Parker and Mason's 2010 study introduced a relationship between transformational leadership with work adaptation and work performance. The study stated that transformational leadership relates to adaptive performance by having team members become creative in the different strategies that can be used when approaching a certain situation which eventually leads to a higher performance. Being creative and handling stressful situations the team leader as well as the team exemplifies the dimensions of adaptive performance. This particular leadership style has also been shown as a motivator to increase the behavior of performance and adaptability in employees. An individual showcasing transformational leadership has the ability to encourage more adaptive and productive behavior within team members through presenting new ideas and possible outcomes in the workplace.

=== Leadership and adaptive decision making ===
An individual who displays leadership adaptability is one who is able to adjust their thoughts and behavior to attain appropriate responses to complex situations helping them make appropriate decisions. A leader must make decisions and be adaptable to any organizational changes in order for the team to collectively continue workplace productivity. An adaptive leader makes decisions to perform a specific action to better fit the organization and help it become productive. By a leader displaying adaptive performance when making a decision, the team leader shows their awareness of a situation leading to new actions and strategies to reestablish fit and effectiveness. Organizations value the characteristic of adaptive decision making in an individual as it displays an individual's understanding and adjusting capabilities to a difficult situation further aiding in the decision making process.

== See also ==
- Flexibility (personality)
- Integrative complexity
- Openness to experience
- Organisation climate
- Psychological resilience
- Situation awareness
- Turnover (employment)
- Workplace
- Occupational burnout
