= Collective leadership =

Distribution of power within an organisational structure

In communist and socialist theory, collective leadership is a shared distribution of power within an organizational structure. A single officer, such as the general secretary or party chair, is supposed to be only primus inter pares on the relevant leadership body.

== Communist states ==
=== China ===
Official post-Mao historiography portrays 1966 as the year when Mao wrongly abandoned the organizational principle of collective leadership (Chinese: 集体领导; pinyin: jiti lingdao). Collective leadership in the People's Republic of China (PRC) and the Chinese Communist Party (CCP) is generally considered to have then begun with reformist Deng Xiaoping in the late 1970s during the same time period as the reform and opening up, who tried to encourage the CCP Politburo Standing Committee to rule by consensus in order to prevent a resurgence of autocracy under Maoist rule. CCP general secretary Jiang Zemin formally established himself as the "first among equals". Some political analysts has alleged that this era of collective leadership has been said to end with Xi Jinping, following the abolition of term limits in 2018 under his tenure. Academic Joseph Torigian, however, has argued that the notion of collective leadership under Deng is a "myth", stating that Deng used collective leadership to politically damage Hua Guofeng, who he believes adhered to collective leadership far more.

Brookings Institution fellow and former US National Security Council China director Jonathan A. Czin argues Hu Jintao's adherence to collective leadership "prevented him and others from acting decisively", meaning "Hu’s attempts to reorient policy—including efforts to address the glaring inequalities he saw emerging from China’s modernization—largely failed to gain traction" and that corruption became endemic. Czin argues this led Xi to believe collective leadership was the "source of many of the party’s maladies" and led to Xi's centralization of power.

Xi has taken deliberate steps to establish his personal dominance within the Chinese political system, effectively rising above his peers in the Politburo Standing Committee. He has done so by creating key bodies such as the National Security Commission, which holds sway over party, state, and military organizations. Furthermore, Xi heads the Small Leadership Group on Comprehensively Deepening Reform, a pivotal entity responsible for designing and executing various reform initiatives. His leadership of this group underscores his intention to personally oversee institutional reforms.

Xi has made it clear that he will have the final say in economic and financial matters, foregoing the tradition of shared responsibility with the Premier. Consequently, Xi's purview now extends to encompass military affairs, security, foreign policy, economic reform, state-building, economic policymaking, and social governance. This concentration of power has led to concerns that Xi's actions might be undermining essential party norms and pushing China toward a more personalistic dictatorship, a notion reinforced by the party machine and state media's vigorous promotion of his image and authority through various channels such as publishing his speeches and writings, public appearances, and the creation of cartoons portraying him as a strong leader.

The central authority of the Chinese government and CCP is concentrated in the CCP Politburo Standing Committee, which is composed of seven members of the Communist Party and headed by the CCP general secretary. Nevertheless, while the CCP de jure maintains collective leadership of government, the position of the CCP general secretary has palpably become more powerful under Xi's administration, with him being the most powerful paramount leader since Mao Zedong.

=== Vietnam ===
In the Socialist Republic of Vietnam (SRV) under the Communist Party of Vietnam (CPV), when the country was ruled by Lê Duẩn, collective leadership involved powers being distributed from the office of General Secretary of the Communist Party and shared with the Politburo Standing Committee while still retaining one ruler. Power is shared between the General Secretary, President, the Prime Minister as well as the National Assembly Chairmain along with collegial bodies such as the Politburo, Secretariat and the Central Committee.

=== Soviet Union ===
Collective leadership (Russian: коллективное руководство, kollektivnoye rukovodstvo) or Collectivity of leadership (Russian: коллективность руководства, kollektivnost rukovodstva), was considered an ideal form of governance in the Union of Soviet Socialist Republics (USSR) under the Communist Party of the Soviet Union (CPSU). Its main task was to distribute powers and functions among the Politburo, the Central Committee, and the Council of Ministers to hinder any attempts to create a one-man dominance over the Soviet political system by a Soviet leader, such as that seen under Joseph Stalin's rule. On the national level, the heart of the collective leadership was officially the Central Committee of the Communist Party, but in practice, was the Politburo. Collective leadership is characterized by limiting the powers of the General Secretary and the Chairman of the Council of Ministers (Premier) as related to other offices by enhancing the powers of collective bodies, such as the Politburo.

According to Soviet literature, Vladimir Lenin was the perfect example of a leader ruling in favour of the collective. Stalin was also claimed to embody this style of ruling, with most major policy decisions involving lengthy discussion and debate in the Politburo and/or Central Committee; after his death in 1953, Nikita Khrushchev accused Stalin of one-man dominance, leading to controversy surrounding the period of his rule. At the 20th Party Congress, Stalin's reign was criticized by Khrushchev as a "personality cult". As Stalin's successor, Khrushchev supported the ideal of collective leadership but increasingly ruled in an autocratic fashion, his anti-Stalin accusations followed by much the same behaviour which led to accusations of hypocrisy. In 1964, Khrushchev was ousted and replaced by Leonid Brezhnev as General Secretary and by Alexei Kosygin as Premier. Collective leadership was strengthened during the Brezhnev years and the later reigns of Yuri Andropov and Konstantin Chernenko. Mikhail Gorbachev's reforms helped spawn factionalism within the Soviet leadership, and members of Gorbachev's faction openly disagreed with him on key issues. The factions usually disagreed on how little or how much reform was needed to rejuvenate the Soviet system.

== Other left-wing parties ==
Aside from communist states, left-wing to far-left green and socialist parties in liberal democracies often also practice collective leadership under socialist ideals, either through male and female co-leaders or through several co-spokespersons. For green parties, this practice is often justified by their movement's emphasis on consensus decision making and gender equality.

- Alliance 90/The Greens: the Federal Executive is divided between two co-equal spokespersons, a political director, treasurer, and two vice-chairs.
- Québec solidaire divides its leadership among its president, secretary-general, and male and female spokespersons
- Green Party of England and Wales: from 1990 to 1991, the GPE&W practiced co-leadership among six spokespersons, and from 1991 to 2008, the GPEW practiced it through a male and female spokesperson. After Caroline Lucas was elected the party's first sole leader and deputy leader in 2008, collective leadership was in hiatus until 2016, when the party leadership was once again divided between male and female co-leaders Adrian Ramsay and Carla Denyer under a job-share agreement while retaining a deputy leader. As of 2025, the party only has one leader, Zack Polanski.
- Green Party of Canada: adopted a co-leadership model for its party leaders in 2025.
- Left Bloc (Portugal): formally, it has always had a collective leadership as provided for in its by-laws and no one-person office has ever been recognised. In practice, there has always been a single prominent figure (coordinator, 1999-2012 and 2016-; spokesperson, 2014–2016), except for between 2012 and 2014, when it had a de facto co-leadership between a male and a female apart from the legal structures. From 2014 to 2016, there was an informal collective and gender-balanced leadership of six people on top of the existing bodies, with a member serving as the party's spokesperson.
- Scottish Green Party: began to practice collective leadership in 2004 with the election of a male and a female co-convenor.
- New Popular Front: A broad left-wing electoral alliance of political parties in France.
- Green Party of the United States: the Green National Committee's steering committee is a collective leadership of seven co-chairs, as well as a secretary and a treasurer.
- The Left (Germany): the party executive consists of an elected 44-member committee, headed by a 12-member executive board comprising two party chairpeople, four deputy chairs, a national secretary, treasurer, and four other members.
- International Socialist Alternative: The leading body of the ISA is the World Congress, which elects an International Committee (IC) to govern between congresses. The IC then appoints an International Executive (IE) body which is responsible for the day-to-day work of the International.
- Your Party, led by a panel of its members in the form of a 24-member Central Executive Committee (CEC), chosen by its membership.
- Several Irish left-wing parties have collective leadership:
  - People Before Profit–Solidarity
    - Solidarity
  - Socialist Party
  - Independents 4 Change

== See also ==
- Business partnering
- Collaboration
- Collaborative leadership
- Collective intelligence
- Collective intentionality
- Group cognition
- Group decision-making
- Problem solving
- Shared leadership
- Situational leadership theory
- Strategic alliance
