= Functional diversity =

Functional diversity can refer to:

- Functional diversity (disability), a term for special needs, disability, impairment and handicap
- Functional diversity (ecology), the elements of biodiversity that influence how ecosystems function; see diversity-function debate
- Functional diversity (geography), a term in geography
- Functional diversity (organizational), a term referring to a mixture of expertise or specialization in a human group or organization
