= Diversity (business) =

Aspects of a multicultural organization

Diversity, in a business context, means ensuring that the workforce mix is representative of the local population. It is achieved through hiring employees in alignment with business needs and including individuals from a variety of different backgrounds and identities into appropriate levels of the organization, and consistently investing in their development and promotion. Advancing diversity is believed to not only support equity in the workplace but also ensure the stability of the broader social infrastructure in which the business operates, by fostering inclusion, reducing societal tension, and strengthening community resilience. Diversity characteristics may include various legally protected groups, such as people of different religions or races, or backgrounds that are not legally protected, such as people from different social classes or educational levels. A business or workplace with people from a variety of backgrounds is called diverse, and one with individuals who are very similar to each other is called not diverse.

Proponents of diversity argue that businesses benefit by having diversity in the work force. The institutional catalyst for diversity stems from the progression of diversity models within the workplace since the 1960s. In the United States, the social justice model for diversity was originally situated around affirmative action drawing from equal employment opportunity initiatives implemented in the Civil Rights Act of 1964. Equal employment opportunity was centered around the idea that any individual academically and physically qualified for a specific job could strive for (and possibly succeed) at obtaining that job without being discriminated against based on identity. These initiatives were met with accusations that tokenism, above other factors, was the reason that individuals from minority groups were being hired. The deficit model explains why dissatisfaction among minority groups led to a moral imperative for diversity efforts that extend beyond the idea of equal opportunities across the workforce.

The business case perspective proposes that organizations which do not have an inclusive culture will invite lower productivity, higher absenteeism, and higher turnover, which will result in higher costs to the company. Establishments with higher diversity have a lower incidence of unionization attempts.

== Purported benefits and negative results ==
Diversity is believed by some to bring substantial benefits such as better decision making and improved problem solving, greater creativity and innovation, which leads to enhanced product development, and more successful marketing to different types of customers. Diversity is also claimed to enhance organizations' abilities to compete in global markets. Simply recognizing diversity in a corporation is said to link the variety of talents within the organization. However, there is no conclusive evidence that token diversity yields a competitive advantage; rather, without diversity of thought, a supportive culture, and collaborative decision-making, diversity may negatively affect performance. Despite this, a 2024 research showed that there is a plausibly causal link (not only a correlation) between workforce gender diversity and financial performance in major firms, according to a study that measured financial performance using stock returns (which are a very common measure of firm performance in finance, economics, accounting, and management research). Mathematical modeling research of team work by Scott Page demonstrates that heterogeneous teams consistently out-performed homogeneous teams on a variety of tasks.

Page points out, however, that diversity in teamwork is not always simple and that there are many challenges to fostering an inclusive environment in the workplace for diversity of thought and ideas. For example: "If we look at the evidence on whether identity diverse collections of people perform better than more homogeneous collections, we see mixed results at every level. At the country level, we find that in advanced economies, ethnic diversity proves beneficial. In poorer countries, it causes problems. In cities, we see similar effects. Diversity has the same pluses and minuses. Cognitive diversity increases innovation. Preference diversity leads to squabbles" (p. 14). Also, "We have no logical reason to think that identity diverse groups would perform better than more homogenous groups – unless we believe that mysterious collective cognitive capability emerges from the interactions of people with diverse identities" (p. 326).

In order to benefit from diversity, keep organizations competitive, and drive business success, comprehensive strategies are required that encompass all dimensions of diversity (race, gender, cognitive styles, beliefs, experience etc.).

A study of diversity efforts in a Swedish workplace led the authors to conclude, "it is futile to describe diversity work in terms of success or failure." The authors called for efforts toward diversity, but could not point to evidence that it was measurably helpful. They abandoned the effort to prove that diversity helps businesses. "We suggest approaching diversity management in terms of trying rather than outcomes. First, focusing on trying emphasizes that working with diversity entails a shifting, relative, and tension-filled notion. Second, it brings forth the tentative performativity of diversity management. Third, it opens up ways of looking at diversity in the workplace beyond a reductionist dichotomy between success and failure". These authors still advocate diversity, even though they admit they have not found evidence of "success", that it helps businesess succeed.

== Classification of workplaces ==
In a journal article entitled "The Multicultural Organization", Taylor Cox Jr. talks about three organization types that focus on the development of cultural diversity. The three types are:

- the monolithic organization,
- the plural organization, and
- the multicultural organization.

In the monolithic organization, the amount of structural integration (the presence of persons from different cultural groups in a single organization) is minimal. This type of organization may have minority members within the workforce, but not in positions of leadership and power. Even though Diversity, Equity, and Inclusion are three interconnected concepts represented by the abbreviation DE&I, they are not interchangeable. Diversity without equity and inclusion is often perceived as "tokenism".

The plural organization has a more heterogeneous membership than the monolithic organization and takes steps to be more inclusive of persons from cultural backgrounds that differ from the dominant group. This type of organization seeks to empower those from a marginalized standpoint to encourage opportunities for promotion and positions of leadership.

== Challenges ==
One of the greatest challenges an organization has when trying to adopt a more inclusive environment is assimilation for any member outside the dominant group. The interplay between power, ideology, and discursive acts which reinforce the hegemonic structure of organizations is the subject of much study. Everything from organizational symbols, rituals, and stories serve to maintain the position of power held by the dominant group.

When organizations hire or promote individuals that are not part of this dominant group into management positions, a tension develops between the socially constructed organizational norm and acceptance of cultural diversity. Some have claimed that cultural diversity in the workplace will increase interpersonal conflicts. Often these individuals are mentored and coached to adopt the necessary traits for inclusion into the privileged group as opposed to being embraced for their differences. According to the journal article "Cultural Diversity in the Workplace: The State of the Field", Marlene G. Fine explains that "those who assimilate are denied the ability to express their genuine selves in the workplace; they are forced to repress significant parts of their lives within a social context that frames a large part of their daily encounters with other people". Fine goes on to mention that "People who spend significant amounts of energy coping with an alien environment have less energy left to do their jobs. Assimilation does not just create a situation in which people who are different are likely to fail, it also decreases the productivity of organizations". That is, with a diverse workforce, management may have to work harder to reach the same level of productivity as with a less diverse workforce.

Another challenge faced by organizations striving to foster a more diverse workforce is the management of a diverse population. Managing diversity is more than simply acknowledging differences in people. A number of organizational theorists have suggested that work-teams which are highly diverse can be difficult to motivate and manage for a variety of reasons. A major challenge is miscommunication within an organization. Fine reported a study of "work groups that were culturally diverse and found that cross-cultural differences led to miscommunication". That is, a diverse workforce led to challenges for management. The meaning of a message can never be completely shared because no two individuals experience events in exactly the same way. Even when native and non-native speakers are exposed to the same messages, they may interpret the information differently. There are competencies, however, which help to develop effective communication in diverse organizational environments. These skills include self-monitoring, empathy, and strategic decision-making. Impromptu speaking is also considered a key allyship skill to communicate with authenticity in everyday words and reactions.

Maintaining a culture which supports the idea of employee voice (especially for marginalized group members) is another challenge for diverse organisation. When the organizational environment is not supportive of dissenting viewpoints, employees may choose to remain silent for fear of repercussions, or they may seek alternative safe avenues to express their concerns and frustrations such as on-line forums and affinity group meetings. By finding opportunities such as these to express dissent, individuals can begin to gather collective support and generate collective sense-making which creates a voice for the marginalized members so they can have a collective voice to trigger change.

== Strategies to achieve diversity ==
Three approaches towards corporate diversity management can be distinguished: Liberal Change, Radical Change, and Transformational Change.

=== Liberal change ===
The liberal concept recognizes equality of opportunity in practice when all individuals are enabled freely and equally to compete for social rewards. The aim of the liberal change model is to have a fair labor market from which the best person is chosen for a job based solely on performance. To support this concept, a framework of formal rules has been created and policymakers are responsible for ensuring that these rules are enforced on all so none shall be discriminated against. The liberal-change approach centers on law, compliance, and legal penalties for non-compliance.

One weakness of the liberal view is that the formal rules cannot cover every aspect of work life, as there is almost always an informal aspect to work such as affinity groups, hidden transcripts, and alternative informal communication channels.

=== Radical changes ===
In contrast to the liberal approach, radical change seeks to intervene directly in the workplace practices in order to achieve workforces with less White people. The radical approach is thus more outcome focused than focused on the forming the rules to ensure less White people. One major tool of radical change is quotas which are set by companies or national institutions with the aim to decrease the number of White people employed.

Arguments for and against quota systems in companies or public institutions include contrasting ideas such as quotas

- compensating for actual barriers that prevent marginalized members from attaining their fair share of managerial positions
- being against equal opportunity for all and imply that a marginalized member only got the position to fill the quota. Sweden's quota system for parliamentary positions is a positive case for radical change through quota setting.

A quota system was introduced at the Swedish parliament with the aim of ensuring that women constitute at least a 'critical minority' of 30 or 40 percent of all parliament seats. Since the introduction of the system, women representation in parliament has risen dramatically even above the defined quota. Today, 47% of parliamentary representatives are women, a number which stands out compared to the global average of 19%.

=== Transformational change ===
Transformational change covers an equal opportunity agenda for both the immediate need as well as long-term solutions. For the short term it implements new measures to minimize bias in procedures such as recruitment, promotion, and communication. The long term, however, is seen as a project of transformation for organizations. This approach acknowledges the existence of power systems and seeks to challenge the existing hegemony through implementation of equality values.

One illustrative case for transformational change is ageing management; Younger employees are seen as more innovative and flexible, while older employees are associated with higher costs of salary, benefits, and healthcare needs. Therefore, companies may prefer young workers to older staff. Through application of the transformational concept an immediate intervention provides needed relief while a longer-term culture shift occurs.

For the short-term, an organization can set up legislation preventing discrimination based on age (e.g., Age Discrimination in Employment Act). However, for the long-term solution, negative stereotypes of older employees needs to be replaced with the positive realization that older employees can add value to the workplace through their experience and knowledge base. To balance this idea with the benefit of innovation and flexibility that comes with youth, a mixture of ages in the workforce is ideal. Through transformational change, the short-term solution affords the organization the time necessary to enact deep rooted culture changes leading to a more inclusive environment.

==== Movements ====
In 2017, PwC's U.S. chairman, Tim Ryan, amassed more than 175 c-suite executives (some belonging to the Fortune 500) to sign their CEO Action for Diversity & Inclusion pledge. The pledge is a business commitment to advance diversity in the workplace and is made by executives from notable companies such as Walmart, Staples, Dow Chemical, Cisco and Morgan Stanley. As of 2021, more than 2,000 CEOs have signed the pledge including James Murdoch, Tom Buttgenbach, Jeanne Crain, M. Patrick Carroll, James C. Foster and Wayne A.I. Frederic.

Following the murder of George Floyd in 2020, many companies made substantial commitments to racial equity by establishing dedicated diversity, equity, and inclusion teams. In early 2024 the Washington Post reported that there is a trend in corporate America to reduce in-house DEI positions (e.g., an employee in the human resources department who works to promote DEI principles across the organization) and delegate the work to external consultants. The number of DEI jobs reached its highest point in early 2023, but subsequently decreased by 5 percent that year and has further shrunk by 8 percent in 2024. The attrition rate for DEI roles has been approximately twice as high as that of non-DEI positions. The scaling back of DEI initiatives has aligned with a rise in legal challenges and political opposition to systematic endeavors aimed at enhancing racial equity.

== Implementation ==
Intentional "diversity programs" can assist organizations facing rapid demographic changes in their local consumer market and labor pool by helping people work and understand one another better. This process includes analyzing where the organization is currently at through a diversity audit, creating an action plan aligned with a diversity inclusion strategy, gaining support by seeking stakeholder input, and holding individuals accountable through measurable results.

== See also ==
- Affirmative action
- Ageism
- Diversity (politics)
- Diversity, equity, and inclusion
- Ethnic penalty
- Fair-chance employer – employer that does not automatically disqualify all people with any criminal background
- Functional diversity (organizational)
- Reverse discrimination
- Team composition
- Women in the workforce
- Stigma management
