= R. Roosevelt Thomas Jr. =

American business consultant, educator, and author (1944–2013)

- Born: Rufus Roosevelt Thomas Jr. May 24, 1944; Chattanooga, Tennessee
- Died: May 17, 2013 (aged 68); Atlanta, Georgia, U.S.
- Education: Morehouse College (BA); University of Chicago (MBA); Harvard University (DBA)
- Occupations: Management consultant, educator, author
- Employers: Harvard Business School (1973–1978); Clark Atlanta University (1979-1988); American Institute for Managing Diversity (1984-); Morehouse College (1969-1970; 1988–1993)
- Spouse: Ruby L. Jones (m. 1971)
- Children: 3

Rufus Roosevelt Thomas Jr. (May 24, 1944 – May 17, 2013) was an American educator, author, speaker, and management consultant specializing in diversity management. For more than three decades, Thomas was a consultant to large corporations, professional firms, government agencies, nonprofits and academic institutions. He is the author of seven books on managing diversity. As the founder and first president of the American Institute for Managing Diversity Thomas was referred to as the "father of diversity" and recognized as a pioneer in the global diversity industry.

== Early life and education ==
Thomas was born on May 24, 1944, in Chattanooga, Tennessee to Icye (née Potts) and Rufus R. Thomas Sr. (1917–1999). He grew up in Chattanooga with his brother, Robert Potts Thomas, attending Chattanooga Public Schools and graduating from Howard High School in 1962.

Thomas went on to attend Morehouse College, where he pledged the Phi Beta Kappa fraternity and received his B.A. summa cum laude in Mathematics in 1966. He earned his M.B.A. in finance at the University of Chicago Booth School of Business. Following graduation he returned to Morehouse to teach economics, finance and accounting.

In 1970, Thomas enrolled at Harvard Business School. The following year, he married Ruby L. Jones, a Wellesley College graduate. In 1974, Thomas received his D.B.A. in Organizational Behavior while he was a Harvard faculty member. His dissertation was titled "The Management of the Liberal Arts College: A Case Study".

== Career ==
=== Harvard Business School ===
Thomas began his career as an assistant professor at Harvard Business School, serving on the faculty until 1978.

=== Clark Atlanta University ===
In 1979, Thomas was recruited to be the dean of the business school at Clark Atlanta University (formerly Atlanta University).

=== American Institute for Managing Diversity ===
In 1984, Thomas founded the American Institute for Managing Diversity, a nonprofit diversity think tank located on Morehouse's campus. He is credited with broadening the topic of managing diversity in organizations to move beyond affirmative action and include all employees. He argued that managing diversity should viewed as a strategy to empower employees, that an organization should look at its employees’ diversity as an asset, and manage that diversity as an optimal way to conduct business.

Thomas was considered a pioneer in U.S. corporate diversity practices and an influential human resources consultant.

=== Morehouse College ===
In 1988, Thomas was appointed Secretary of Morehouse, and served until 1993.

== Death ==
On May 17, 2013, Thomas fell and hit his head after exercising in his home gym and never regained consciousness. His funeral was held on Friday, May 24, 2013, at Friendship Baptist Church of Atlanta.

== Personal life ==
Thomas was married for forty-two years to Judge Ruby J. Thomas (née Jones), an Atlanta native who attended Wellesley College and Georgia State University School of Law. The couple had three children: Warren Shane Thomas, Jarred Thomas, and April Thomas.

Thomas was member of Alpha Phi Alpha fraternity and Sigma Pi Phi fraternity (Boule).

== Awards and honors ==
- 1995: Received the American Society for Training and Development's Distinguished Contribution to Human Resource Development's Award.
- 1998: Elected and installed as a Fellow at the National Academy of Human Resources
- 2003: Society for Human Resource Management (SHRM) board member (until 2005)
- 2005: Trailblazer in Diversity Award, Bennett College's Chief Diversity Officers Forum.

== Publications ==
- Thomas, Roosevelt R. Jr. (March–April 1990). ‘From Affirmative Action to Affirming Diversity, Harvard Business Review.
- Thomas, Roosevelt R., Jr. (1991). Beyond Race and Gender: Unleashing the Power of Your Total Workforce, New York: AMACOM.
- Thomas, Roosevelt R., Jr. (1991). Total Quality of Managing Diversity. Executive Leadership Council.
- Thomas, Roosevelt R., Jr. (1992). Differences Do Make a Difference. American Institute for Managing Diversity, Inc.
- Thomas, Roosevelt R., Jr. (1996). Redefining Diversity, New York, NY: AMACOM, 1996.
- Thomas, Roosevelt R., Jr. and Marjorie I. Woodruff (1999). Building a House for Diversity: A Fable about a Giraffe and an Elephant offers New Strategies for Today’s Workforce. New York: AMACOM Books.
- Thomas, Roosevelt R., Jr. (1999). “Diversity Management: Some Measurement Criteria,” Employment Relations Today, Winter 1999, pp. 49–62.
- Thomas, Roosevelt R. Jr. (2002). The Giraffe and Elephant: A Diversity Fable. American Institute for Managing Diversity, Inc. AMACOM, a division of the American Management Association.
- Thomas, Roosevelt R. Jr. (2010). World Class Diversity Management: A Strategic Approach. SBN: 1605094501. ISBN 9781605094502.
