= Kenneth Leithwood =

Kenneth "Ken" Leithwood is an educational researcher and professor at the Ontario Institute for Studies in Education in Toronto, Canada.

His research has focused on school leadership, processes of school reform, and assessment of educational policy.

== Research and consulting ==
Leithwood co-authored How Leadership Influences Student Learning (2004), an extensive review of successful school leadership practices. Among its conclusion were "of all the factors that contribute to what students learn at school...leadership is second in strength only to classroom instruction," and "effective leadership has the greatest impact in those circumstances (e.g., schools "in trouble") in which it is most needed." The study also outlined leadership practices associated with student success, including:

- Setting a direction to enable student learning, using a whole school curriculum, being consistent, and setting high expectations.
- Managing teaching and learning to enable consistency, innovation and personalized learning.
- Developing people, so that students are active learners and teachers participate in professional learning communities.
- Developing an organization which is evidence-based, and where networks are formed to build curriculum and support professionalism.

Leithwood has led research on transformational leadership, in which schools move beyond first-order surface changes, to second-order changes which involve pedagogy, curriculum and assessment—enabled by a collaborative culture.

In 2009, Leithwood was appointed research adviser to the Ontario Ministry of Education's Ontario Leadership Strategy.

Leithwood has consulted in several Canadian provinces on the topics of school leadership and student achievement. Internationally, he has consulted to the Greater New Orleans School Leadership Center, and to the State of Connecticut. He has also been an external evaluator to England's National Literacy and Numeracy Strategies.

== Publications ==
=== Books ===
- Studies in Curriculum Decision Making (1982)
- The Role of the Secondary School Principal in Policy Implementation and School Improvement (1986)
- Expert Problem Solving: Evidence from School and District Leaders (1995)
- Educational Accountability: The State of the Art (1999)
- Making Schools Smarter (2003)
- Educational Leadership for Organizational Learning and Improved Student Outcomes (2004)
- Teaching for Deep Understanding (2006)
- Making Schools Smarter: Leading With Evidence (2006)
- Successful Principal Leadership in Times of Change: An International Perspective (2007)
- Distributed Leadership According to the Evidence (2008)
- Leadership With Teacher Emotions in Mind (2008)
- Leading School Turnaround: How Successful Leaders Transform Low Performing Schools (2010)

== Honours ==
- University of Toronto's Impact on Public Policy award.
- Fellow of the Royal Society of Canada.
