= Team composition =

Team composition refers to the overall mix of characteristics among people in a team, which is a unit of two or more individuals who interact interdependently to achieve a common objective. It is based on the attributes among individuals that comprise the team, in addition to their main objective.

Team composition is usually either homogeneous, in which all members are the same, or heterogeneous, in which team members all contain significant differences. It has also been identified as a key factor that influences team performance. It factors in the individual attributes of team members (e.g. skill, experience, and ability) and how these contributions can potentially combine to dictate overall performance outcomes for the team. In the past decade, research on team effectiveness has burgeoned as teams have become increasingly common in organizations of all kinds.

Research conducted on this topic has focused on aggregated member characteristics, member heterogeneity and team size as categories associated with team composition. The fashion in which a team is configured has a strong influence on team processes and the outcomes that the team achieves. The main outcomes associated with team performance can be classified mostly as performance outcomes (overall quality/precision of work produced, etc.) internal member outcomes (group cohesion, etc.) and behavioral outcomes (absenteeism, etc.).

== Attributes ==
=== Team size ===
The preferred team size has a significant impact on team sport. Team size is determined by the original purpose for the team, the individual expectations for the members of the team, the roles that the team members need to play, the amount of cohesiveness and inter-connectivity optimal for team performance and the functions, activities and overall goals of the team.

While the size of a team is dependent upon many variables, the concept of "ideal" team size also varies. A variety of recommendations are easily found in multiple research studies, but these types of recommendations are difficult to evaluate, because they are often based on anecdotal evidence rather than empirical evidence. However, it is difficult to determine what constitutes appropriate team size from empirical research. Some research suggests that size has a curvilinear relationship with effectiveness such that too few or too many members reduces performance, whereas other studies have found team size to be unrelated to performance or increasing team size actually improves performance without limit.

These differing recommendations and results are likely due to the fact that appropriate team size is dependent on the task and the context in which the team operates. For example, larger teams may have access to more resources, such as time, energy, money, and expertise, that may not only facilitate team performance on more difficult tasks but also can provide more "slack" if environmental conditions worsen. However, larger teams can also experience coordination problems that interfere with performance and motivation losses caused by a dispersion of responsibility. Overall, the question of the "optimal" group size is a complex one and future research is needed to accurately determine the impact of team size given specific team contingencies, such as the nature of the team task.

=== Homogeneous vs. heterogeneous ===
Homogeneous teams may perform better due to similarities in experience and thought, while heterogeneous teams may perform better due to diversity and greater ability to take on multiple roles. For example, homogeneous groups displayed better initial performance than heterogeneous groups, but these effects dissipated across time and heterogeneous groups later performed better than more homogeneous groups. Members of demographically diverse teams are likely to differ to a greater extent in their interpretations of the team’s goals and/or the divergent ideas for an adequate approach to implement strategy than members of demographically homogeneous groups. These terms, however, must be given a framework, as a team could be homogeneous for some characteristics and heterogeneous for others. The importance placed on team design derives from the need to align a team's composition with organizational goals and resources. Research on team composition has suggested that homogeneous teams are more satisfied and experience more positive reactions, while heterogeneous teams experience enhanced team creativity and also bring a wider variety of solutions to a given problem. However, external factors are important to consider when deciding on which type of team to compose for completing any certain objective. For example, research has shown that homogeneous teams can become more creative if properly incentivized to do so, while heterogeneous teams can discover similarities among themselves after working together that can allow them to develop greater team cohesion as time passes. Furthermore, homogeneous organizational teams in terms of age, race and gender are hypothesized to report less conflict as compared to heterogeneous organizational teams. For these reasons, demographically diverse teams are likely to experience more interpersonal incompatibilities and disagreements about their tasks and team processes than demographically homogeneous teams.

=== Faultlines ===
Faultlines concern the attributes of several team members simultaneously and mirror the structure of diversity within a team. The strength of a faultline indicates the level of similarity within potential subteams and its width the extent of dissimilarity between them. A group faultline depends on the compositional dynamics of multiple attributes that can potentially subdivide a group and they increase in strength as more attributes are highly correlated. For example, a mixed team of men and women would have an imaginary split between the two genders. When a team is in its initial stages of forming, members may use demographic traits, such as gender, to place themselves into a sub-team.

If the team’s characteristics are highly correlated, faultlines become stronger, increasing the likelihood that sub-teams will develop. Faultlines, regardless of their origin, are likely to impair team functioning because individuals begin to create more interpersonal connections within the sub-team than with the team as a whole. In severe cases, the members of a sub-team may feel like the split is irreconcilable and break away completely from the team or organization.

=== Demographic traits ===
Team diversity refers to the distribution of personal attributes across members of an organizational work team. The diversity of member composition in organizational teams has generated considerable interest because of its theoretical and practical importance in the study of task-focused teams in organizations. One facet of these compositional attributes reflects demographic and work-related diversity among individuals, making it a relevant area for further understanding of inputs that affect team functioning, such as experimenting, admitting mistakes and seeking feedback. Diversity of age, gender, and race are considered to be the most important demographic factors resulting from team composition.

Surface-level diversity reflects differences that are more readily observable (e.g., race, gender). Deep-level diversity reflects differences that are less visible (e.g., personality, values). The distinction between these two types of surface- and deep-level attributes is important because demographic attributes may not be as relevant to a team’s given task, but they shape members’ perceptions and behaviors.

The effect of diversity on team outcomes is likely to depend on multiple factors. First, the effects of diversity probably depend on the nature of the team’s task. Second, the effects of diversity may depend on the particular outcomes studied. Research seems to suggest that diversity may have a positive effect on performance, but a more negative effect on behavioral outcomes, such as team member turnover. The inconsistency of the results of research on the impact of diversity in teams on team functioning is due to the focus of most studies on a single characteristic.

=== Age ===
The ages of individual team members can have considerable effects on the success of a team. As tenure with an organization and age increase, so can performance. Older individuals may contribute more professional expertise, years of experience, and gathered knowledge. However, older team members also tend to be less willing to adapt to evolving work environments and are less likely to implement innovative strategies, preferring instead to stick to tried-and-true methods.

=== Gender ===
Gender is another important factor of demographic team composition. Men and women differ in their levels of conformity, preference of power distribution, and behavioral norms. In a dictator game setting, it has been found that groups are more generous and equalitarian when women are the majority. They also find that the most generous groups are those with two men and one woman. Another implication of this phenomenon is the positive relationship that exists between gender diversity in boardrooms and company performance. However, reverse causality is a pervasive problem in these studies, because companies that perform better are quite likely to be companies that also focus more on the gender diversity of their boards.

=== Race ===
Race is a third demographic factor of team composition and has gained additional salience due to the globalization and increasing diversity of the workforce. Within the literature on race and ethnic diversity, there also are some theories that focus on positive predictions or possible positive outcomes of racial/ethnic diversity. This comes from a “value in diversity” perspective which argues that diversity creates value and benefit for team outcomes. The general assumption that underlies these theories is that an increase in racial/ethnic diversity means that a work group will experience possible positive outcomes such as: increased information, enhanced problem solving ability, constructive conflict and debate, increased creativity, higher quality decisions, and increased understanding of different ethnicities/cultures. Another underlying assumption is that surface-level diversity such as race is indicative of deeper-level differences, such as cognitive processes/schemas, differential knowledge base, different sets of experiences, and different views of the world.

=== Knowledge, skills, and abilities (KSAs) ===
The team composition determines the array of knowledge, skills, and abilities within a team. The compositional distribution of team members on any social or psychological attribute that potentially leads to the perception that team members differ from one another, are typically driven by how members process information, such as a diverse set of knowledge, skills, and abilities to solve complex problems.

Knowledge includes the facts and principles that apply to the domain of the team. Skills can be either basic or cross-functional. Basic skills include developed capabilities that assist in the learning or faster acquisition of knowledge. Cross-functional skills assist in the ability to carry out tasks that occur across jobs. Skills can also be categorized into technical skills (adequate ability to do a variety of jobs), human skills (the ability to interact with others), and conceptual skills (the ability to learn and use newly acquired knowledge). Abilities are long-lasting individual traits that impact performance. Abilities can include multiple dimensions ranging from scope (general vs. specific) to origin (innate vs. learned) to focus (task vs. social). Among the factors studied in relation to work team effectiveness, one consistent predictor is team members' collective cognitive ability.

Diversity of abilities within a team offers the advantage of allowing members to learn from each other and to generate new ideas by combining or merging their qualifications.

Stevens and Campion identified two broad skill areas: interpersonal KSAs and self-management KSAs, consisting of 14 specific KSA requirements for effective team work. The requirements include conflict resolution, collaborative problem solving, communication, goal setting and performance management, planning and task coordination.

=== Personality ===
Since the early 1990s, researchers have considered the effects of individual personality traits on team dynamics and performance to be an important team factor. The Big Five personality traits include extraversion (positive emotions, sociability and warmth), conscientiousness (competence order and self-discipline), agreeableness (trust, straightforwardness), openness to experience (new ideas, experiences and imagining), and neuroticism (anxiety, self-consciousness and sensibility). The last decade has witnessed renewed interest in personality that has been extended to teams as researchers have examined the impact of team personality composition on team effectiveness. In general, this research has found a link between aggregate team member personality and team performance. However, most of these studies have been conducted in laboratory settings using creativity as the performance criterion, meaning that they are disjunctive rather than additive tasks. Relatively little has been done to understand the relationship of personality to the performance of actual work teams completing production tasks that are additive. Another reason for the lack of cumulative knowledge in relating personality to actual work-team outcomes has been the lack of a generally accepted taxonomy of personality. Consistent with individual-level research, team-level conscientiousness appears to be a fairly potent positive predictor of team effectiveness. Although conscientiousness has been most frequently studied, some research suggests that other Big Five personality factors, such as extraversion and agreeableness may also play a role in determining work team effectiveness. The recent emergence of the five-factor model (FFM) as a robust taxonomy of personality provides a comprehensive framework from which to examine personality and its relationship to both individual and team performance.

It is evident that individual personality traits affect the team's processes and outcomes. Empirical support has shown the following: the presence of extraversion in team members leads to increased team viability and communication; the presence of conscientiousness leads to an increase in overall performance; the presence of agreeableness in team members leads to an increase in cohesion, communication, productivity, and overall performance; the presence of openness to experience in team members leads to an increase in communication; the presence of neuroticism in team members leads to an increase in cohesion and overall performance.

Although team personality composition appears to be a relatively robust predictor of team effectiveness, research suggests that different compositions may be more or less effective depending on the task and the amount of member interaction required for effective team performance. Research has found that team-level conscientiousness is more strongly related to effectiveness for performance and planning tasks than it is for creativity and decision-making tasks. Even though the mechanisms by which team personality composition influences team performance require further investigation, it is abundantly clear that personality composition has important implications for team effectiveness.

=== Tenure ===
Tenure within a group is an important determinant of group process. Increased tenure is associated with stability, reduced conflict and superior communication. Teams usually have a history and a future, both of which influence current behavior. This highlights the need to assess teams longitudinally—particularly when history and intra team relationships have a logical connection to the variable of interest. Composition variables related to effective team processes are thought to be particularly important for teams that do multiple tasks. Given that teams are thought to pursue multiple goals over time, it could be that the strength of the composition variable and team performance relationships increases over time. This may be particularly true for personality factors such as team conscientiousness given that conscientious individuals engage in task role behaviors associated with goal completion, and these behaviors may be even more important when teams pursue multiple goals.

== Outcomes ==
The overall output or outcome is the result of the team processes and is conceptualized in a multidimensional way. Outputs can occur at different levels: the individual, group, unit, or organization. Output is usually defined by the degree to which a goal is reached. Although a positive team outcome is often considered to be the main aim when teams are formed, it is difficult to define the components of "team outcome". Often, this term is used synonymously with measures of performance or effectiveness.

Team effectiveness research has traditionally followed the input-process-output (I-P-O) tradition. Inputs, such as composition, structure, task, and organizational context, impact team processes and outcomes associated with team effectiveness. However, a closer look at several team models shows that performance or effectiveness is not necessarily the target. Measures of satisfaction, commitment or absenteeism can be equally important. Group outcomes can occur at the individual, group, or organizational level and can be related to each other. The following distinction can be made between three measures of team outcomes: Measures of performance effectiveness assessed in terms of quantity and quality of outputs, e.g. efficiency, productivity, response times, quality, customer satisfaction, and innovation, Member attitudes, e.g. employee satisfaction, commitment, and trust in management, and Behavioral outcomes, e.g. absenteeism, turnover, and safety. There is a distinction between performance outcomes (performance quality, speed of solution, number of errors) and other outcomes (member satisfaction, cohesiveness, attitude change, sociometric structure).

In light of this, three criteria should be utilized to evaluate group outcomes: 1) the result of the groups’ work, i.e. quality or quantity of the output, 2) the willingness and capability of the group to continue working together in the future, and 3) the individual consequences of the collaboration, i.e. satisfaction, and physical and mental health.

== Operationalization ==
Levels of conceptualization, measurement, and analysis have tended to be either ignored or to be treated simply in much of the research on team composition. The considerable use of averaging or utilizing additive models to guide the aggregation of individual characteristics to the team level suggests a very limited conceptualization of the compositional construct at the higher level. Such issues are critical for developing a sound understanding how team member attributes combine to form higher-level constructs and must be carefully articulated.

Well-defined models of emergence need to guide the representation of individual-level characteristics at the team level. Some theoretical research has developed models of the knowledge, skills, and abilities required of workers organized into teams but the association between individual trait characteristics and team performance generally has not been studied in actual field settings, with the exception of a few studies examining composition in terms of member ability. One reason is the difficulty of finding samples with an adequate number of teams. Another reason is that a focus on teams rather than individuals requires composition variables to be measured at an aggregated level of analysis. This higher level of analysis is often difficult because there is not an established theoretical approach for proper aggregation of individual characteristics into team-level constructs.

There are a variety of ways in which team composition can be possibly turned into a measurable team characteristic. The common element of the methodologies involves first measuring characteristics of individual team members. The appropriateness of any operationalization depends largely on the nature of the task being completed by the team, the research questions being asked, and the specific traits being analyzed. However, in the absence of an explicit theoretical model of emergence to guide composition, “team personality” or “team ability” (or other such constructs) are of questionable construct validity and research may yield spurious findings. There has also been a relative lack of attention to the latent constructs that underlie variables of interest within research on team demographic composition. As a result, it is often difficult to determine precisely how or why variables such as team member age, tenure, or demographics influence team processes and outcomes. Recent research on team personality and cognitive ability composition has placed greater attention on understanding these underlying constructs; however, additional research is needed to identify the mechanisms by which team composition has its effects. Researchers have historically adopted three different methods for operationalizing team composition, which will be described below. Individual studies tend to report results for only one of the approaches; consequently, potentially important relationships between the various team-composition operationalizations and team processes and outcomes cannot be detected.

=== Mean score ===
For additive tasks the mean level of a trait may be most appropriate because these tasks are structured so that the contribution of each member adds to a collective pool that can be used to help the team succeed. The most common operationalization is to calculate a mean score for the individual measures. This approach assumes that the amount of a characteristic possessed by each individual member increases the collective pool of that characteristic. That is, more of a trait is always better or worse, regardless of how that characteristic is distributed among team members. The mean score of individual measures is, however, potentially problematic in some instances because aggregation can mask important information when individual characteristics do not combine additively to form a collective resource pool. A team score for a particular characteristic can also be measured by taking the average, or mean, of all team member scores. Using this method, the amount of each trait for individual members is combined to form a group-level measurement of that trait. For example, cohesion could be measured this way. This would be accomplished by providing team members with a survey for them to assess cohesive traits (i.e. cooperation, harmony) and then calculating the average of the survey scores. General Mental Ability (GMA), conscientiousness, agreeableness and emotional stability are examples of a team composition attributes that could be operationalized utilizing the mean.

=== Maximum and minimum scores ===
This approach focuses on the highest or lowest individual-trait score for the team. This is based on research that suggests that a single individual can significantly affect a group. Thus, in some cases the highest (i.e., maximum method) or lowest (minimum method) individual team member score may provide valuable insight. For instance, the inputs of the highest ability member are critical for generating solutions to problems, and the inputs of the lowest ability member significantly affect the quality of assembly-line work (Steiner, 1972). Focusing on the highest or lowest individual-trait score of team members is therefore appropriate in situations where one person has an inordinate effect on team success. Maximum and minimum characteristic scores are considered most important when one team member having or lacking a characteristic will significantly impact the team's performance. For example, a very disagreeable team member may obstruct a team's ability to agree and cause poorer performance outcomes. Conscientiousness, agreeableness and extraversion are examples of team composition attributes that can be operationalized utilizing maximum and minimum scores.

=== Variability ===
This method is used to operationalize team composition focuses on the variability of individual characteristics. Operationalizing composition as variance among team members on a trait may be most appropriate for understanding the effect of group-level traits on compensatory tasks that benefit from diverse inputs. Such measures are frequently used to capture differences in team composition that are masked by the mean. The most common approach has examined the effect of demographic variables on team performance and adopts indexes based on the variance of individual scores for a particular trait. A variation of this approach is to look at the proportion of team members possessing that trait. These examinations of similarity can provide information about fit among team members as well as provide insight about the variety of inputs that team members are expected to bring to the team. Therefore, a focus on the variance of traits is appropriate when researchers seek to understand the relationship of team composition homogeneity to team process and team outcomes. It is possible to look at how much diversity there is on a team by calculating the standard deviation, or how much team member differs on a characteristic. For example, team experience, quantified as the continuous number of years a team member has been on a specific team, could be measured this way. A standard deviation of experience would show the variability in team members' amount of experience in comparison to each other.

== Future research and implications ==
Historically, research on team composition has tended to focus on manifest or descriptive characteristics—size and demographics. More recently, team researchers have started to examine team composition in terms of latent constructs—ability and personality. These lines of research have been largely independent. There is definitely potential value from an integration of these areas. Demographic composition has demonstrated effects, but it is difficult to imagine that such effects occur without mediation by psychological characteristics. Combining these areas may help researchers better focus on identifying mediating characteristics relevant to both types of composition factors. Relatedly, composition research would benefit from more attention to contextual moderators that affect the composition-outcome linkage.

== See also ==
- Adaptive performance
- Career assessment
- Diversity (business)
- Industrial and organizational psychology
- Input-process-output model
- Organization development
- Performance appraisal
- Personality psychology
- Personnel selection
- Psychological safety
- Team conflict
- Team effectiveness
- The Big Five model of personality

== Notes ==
1) In the current psychology and business research literature, the terms "team" and "group," including "work team" and "work group," are terms that are used interchangeably. Throughout this article, all of these variations will be referred to as "team."
2) The term "organization," also representing a variety of concepts, will be used to refer to businesses, firms, and organized teams of all sizes.
