= M. Patrick Carroll =

American businessman

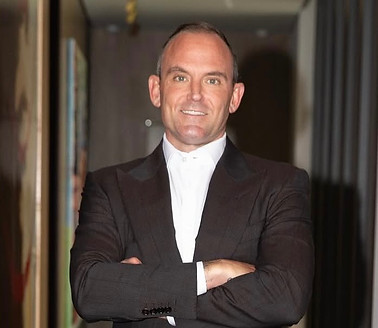
- Occupation: businessman

Michael Patrick Carroll is an American businessman. He was the founder of Carroll Org., a U.S. real estate investment company that sold in December 2023. He also co-owns S.P.A.L., an Italian football team, with Joe Tacopina.

== Career ==
In 2004 he founded Carroll Org., a real estate company focused on acquisitions, asset management services, ground-up development, and fund management. The company is headquartered in Atlanta, Georgia, and having regional offices in Houston, New York, Raleigh, and Tampa. The initial concentration of Carroll's acquisitions was on Florida and Georgia, but spread throughout the Southeast, including North Carolina and South Carolina. More than $13.1 billion worth of real estate has been successfully acquired, developed, or sold by the company since its founding in 2004. The National Apartment Association awarded CARROLL with one of its NAA Best Places to Work Awards in 2021.

Along with Joe Tacopina, he acquired Società Polisportiva Ars et Labor, commonly known as S.P.A.L. on August 19, 2021. The deal's terms were not made public.

In 2021, he bought a lakefront Miami Beach home for $16.4M with his partner, model Alina Baikova with whom he is no longer with or linked to.

== Controversy ==
In January 2023, Carroll rescinded his $1.5M charity auction bids to benefit Ukrainian and Syrian relief efforts after discovering that the money was not tax-deductible.

On April 14, 2023, Carroll attracted media attention for spitting in the face of the manager of Wynwood Eatery, Miguel Weill, after being asked to stop sexually harassing a woman who was eating with her partner.

In March 2024, Carroll was ordered by police to undergo a mental health evaluation after he posted videos of himself on social media that depicted him firing guns and ranting about the Second Amendment outside of his Miami Beach mansion. His neighbors called emergency services based on his behavior, and he was ordered to relinquish all of his firearms under Florida's Red flag law.

On July 1, 2024, Carroll was arrested in Los Angeles for driving under the influence (DUI) and weapons possession. According to reports, he attempted to flee from the police after getting out of his car and running down an embankment. The dramatic chase was captured by local news helicopters. The police recovered weapons from Carroll's possession during the arrest.
