= Collaborative leadership =

Management practice

Collaborative leadership is a management approach characterised by shared decision-making and joint problem-solving. Unlike traditional hierarchical models which rely on centralised authority and formal chains of command, collaborative leadership distributes control among participants and is frequently used in business organisational structures.

== History ==
The term collaborative leadership gained prominence in public sector management literature in the early 1990s. The Institute for Collaborative Leadership was founded in 1992 and became an early advocate of collaborative leadership, describing a form of leadership in the public sector and promoting cross‑agency cooperation in U.S. public administration.

In her 1994 Harvard Business Review article Rosabeth Moss Kanter popularised the concept of "collaborative advantage", arguing that organisations increasingly rely on informal networks and shared problem-solving rather than hierarchical control.

In 2013 Nick Lovegrove and Matthew Thomas – co-founders of The InterSector Project – together with Stephen Goldsmith expanded on these ideas in the Harvard Business Review. They argued that leaders must collaborate across business, government, and civil society in order to address increasingly complex public challenges including healthcare costs, infrastructure, workforce development, smart-grid technologies, and financial-system stability. Their research suggested that effective collaborative leadership depends on the ability to engage across sectors and coordinate institutions with different incentives, cultures, and goals.

Beginning in the late 2000s scholars such as David Archer and Alex Cameron emphasised leadership and the sharing of control across organisational boundaries to achieve joint outcomes. However, Hank Rubin – founder of the Institute for Collaborative Leadership – and Leonard Brock differentiated between collaborative leadership and collective impact, defining the latter as beginning when a community agrees on shared outcomes. As they put it, "Individuals then return to their respective organisations to determine how they, both personally and organisationally, can contribute to achieving those goals".

In their 2008 book Collaborative Leadership: How to Succeed in an Interconnected World, David Archer and Alex Cameron identified the basic objective of the collaborative leader as the delivery of results across boundaries between organisations. They argued that, "getting value from difference is at the heart of the collaborative leader's task", and that leaders must learn to share control and trust partners that operate differently to themselves.

== Characteristics of collaborative leaders ==
Nick Lovegrove and Matthew Thomas interviewed over 100 leaders for their Harvard Business Review article, many of whom demonstrated the ability to work effectively across business, government, and social sectors. The authors identified six major distinguishing characteristics of these leaders:

1. Balanced motivations: a desire to create public value, whether it be through wielding influence (often in government), having social impact (often in nonprofits), or generating wealth (often in business);
2. Transferable skills: a set of distinctive skills that are valued across sectors, such as quantitative analytics, strategic planning, and stakeholder management;
3. Contextual intelligence: empathy for the differences within and between sectors, especially those in language, culture, and key performance indicators;
4. Integrated networks: a set of relationships across sectors to draw on when advancing their careers, building top teams, or convening decision-makers on a particular issue;
5. Prepared mind: a willingness to pursue an unconventional career that zigzags across sectors, and the financial readiness to take potential pay cuts from time to time; and
6. Intellectual thread: holistic subject expertise on a particular intersectional issue by understanding it from the perspective of each sector.

Writing for the Center for Effective Public Policy as part of a research project funded by the United States Department of Justice and the State Justice Institute, Madeline Carter identified five key qualities of collaborative leaders: willingness to take risks; eagerness to listen; passion for the cause; optimism about the future; and ability to share knowledge, power, and credit.

Writing in a Financial Times supplement special report, Rod Newing said that, "If a collaboration is to be effective, each party must recognise and respect the different cultures of the other ... Traditional management development often rewards managers with increasing authority over people and resources. By contrast, collaboration requires leaders to achieve results through people and resources outside their direct control."

In his article, "Collaborative leadership: it's good to talk", Steven Wilson mentioned four key leadership traits that all highly collaborative leaders share:

1. A focus on authentic leadership, placing the goals of the organisation ahead of their own self-interest and following through on their commitments;
2. Relentlessly pursuing transparent decision-making, clarifying how their decisions are made, and nominating who is accountable for the outcomes;
3. Viewing resources as tools for collective action, using them flexibly to achieve shared goals; and
4. Clarifying the relationship between decisions, rights, accountability, and rewards, taking time to establish decision paths and using a common vocabulary that everyone can comprehend.

Wilson further stated that the best thing a collaborative leader can do is to lead by example. Leaders must show a willingness to take risks, continually question their own ideas, and reward others for their clear communication and valuable insights.

== Applications ==
Collaborative leadership is being used in the following areas:

1. Public-private partnerships;
2. Global supply chains;
3. Civic collaboration to solve complex community problems;
4. Online collaboration, such as Linux, Wikipedia, etc.;
5. Political collaboration to address issues such as the 2008 financial crisis, climate change, and terrorism;
6. Government: Heather Getha-Taylor and Ricardo S. Morse found that collaborative leadership affects the roles of local government officials, with public administration shifting toward a more collaborative leadership-oriented field because it supports the development of skills required for these roles;
7. Education: Abdolhamid Arbabi and Vali Mehdinezhad found that collaborative leadership promotes cooperation, which allows for adaptability and consistency, "increasing organisational commitment and decreasing employee resistance to changes". There is a significant correlation between teachers' self-efficacy and their principals' collaborative leadership style. Gialamas, Pelonis, and Medeiros state that collaborative leadership allows leaders to work together and adapt more effectively to change, which supports "growth and development."
8. Health Services: Markle-Reid, Dykeman, Ploeg, Andrews, Bonomo, and Stradiotto found that collaborative leadership in healthcare can provide professionals with the broader set of skills needed to assist patients. One example discussed was that older adults may not always receive the support they need because professionals may have theoretical knowledge but lack the practical skills required in real-time situations. Collaborative leadership helps develop these practical skills and encourages consistent approaches to care.

A 2007 research report published by Ipsos MORI found that relationship management and collaborative leadership were the two capabilities that directors of organisations involved in large business partnerships most wanted greater access to when establishing or managing partnerships.

== See also ==
- Collective intelligence
- Collective decision-making
- Collective problem solving
- Collective intentionality
- Group cognition
- Business partnering
- Collaboration
- Shared leadership
- Situational leadership
- Strategic alliance
