= Team effectiveness =

A team's ability to accomplish their goals or objectives

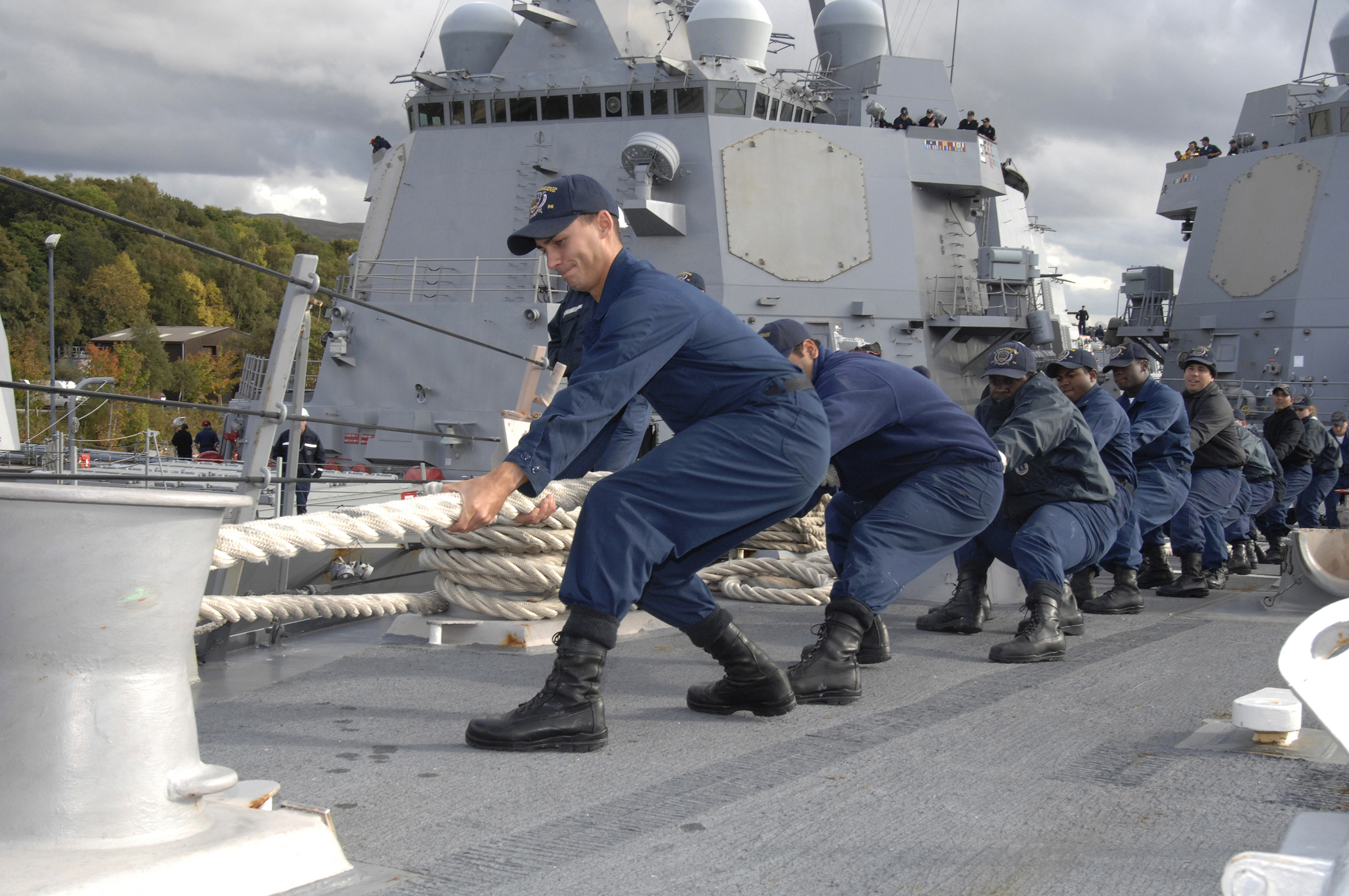
US Navy sailors effectively hauling in a mooring line (2010)

Team effectiveness (also referred to as group effectiveness) is the capacity a team has to accomplish the goals or objectives administered by an authorized personnel or the organization. A team is a collection of individuals who are interdependent in their tasks, share responsibility for outcomes, and view themselves as a unit embedded in an institutional or organizational system which operates within the established boundaries of that system. Teams and groups have established a synonymous relationship within the confines of processes and research relating to their effectiveness (i.e. group cohesiveness, teamwork) while still maintaining their independence as two separate units, as groups and their members are independent of each other's role, skill, knowledge or purpose versus teams and their members, who are interdependent upon each other's role, skill, knowledge and purpose. Several models and frameworks have been proposed to explain or improve team effectiveness.

== Overview ==
The evaluation of how effective a team is, is achieved with the aid of a variety of components derived from research and theories that help in creating a description of the multifaceted nature of team effectiveness. According to Hackman (1987), team effectiveness can be defined in terms of three criteria:

1. Output – The final outputs produced by the team must meet or exceed the standards set by key constituents within the organization
2. Social Processes – The internal social processes operating as the team interacts should enhance, or at least maintain, the group's ability to work together in the future
3. Learning – The experience of working in the team environment should act to satisfy rather than aggravate the personal needs of team members

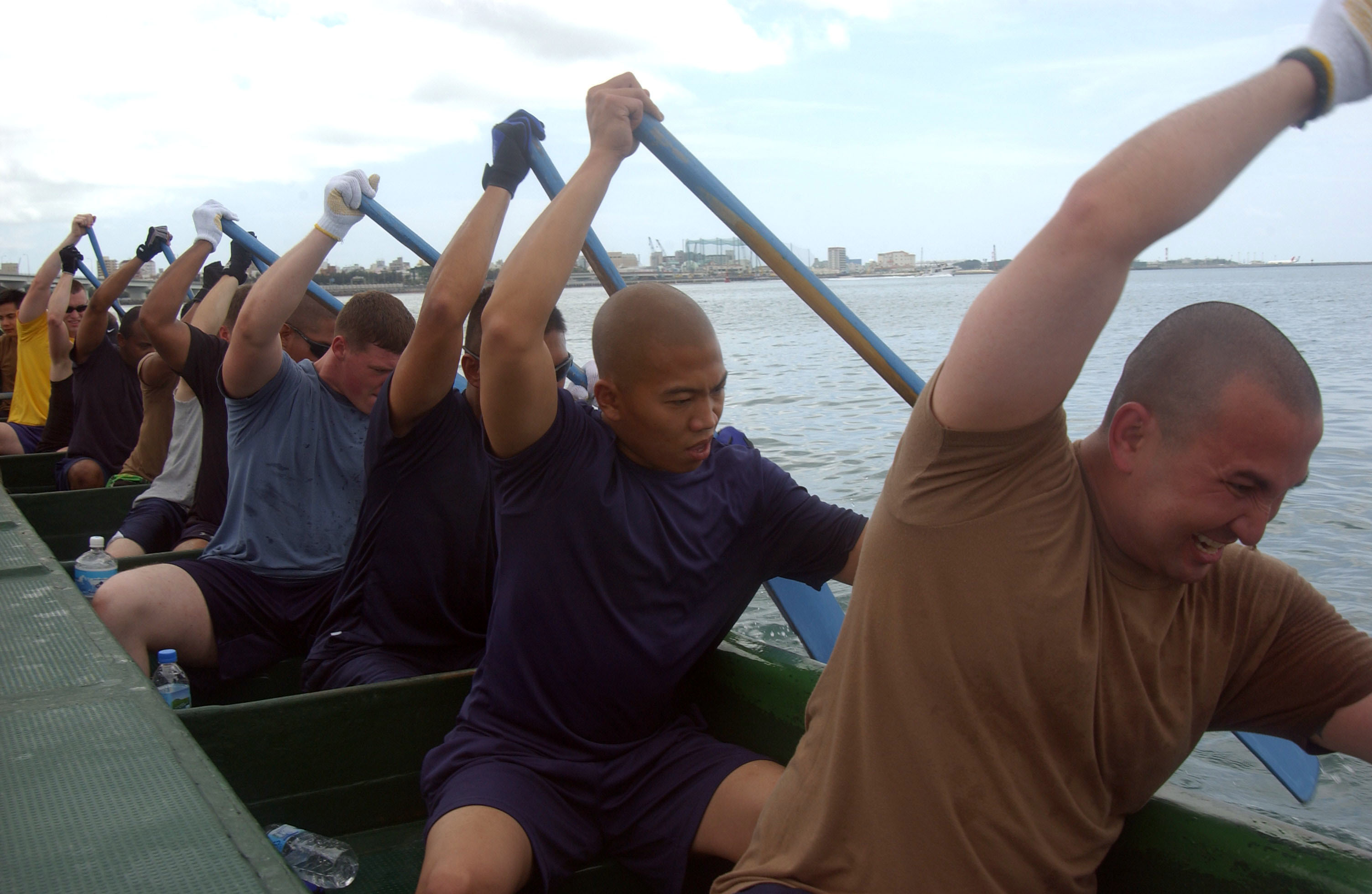
US Navy Outrigger Paddling team rowing with cohesion, efficacy and without group conflict (2007)

In order for these criteria to be assessed appropriately, an evaluation of team effectiveness should be conducted, which involves both a measure of the teams' final task performance as well as criteria with which to assess intragroup process. The three major intragroup process constructs examined are intra-group conflict, team cohesion, and team-efficacy. Intra-group conflict is an integral part of the process a team undergoes and the effectiveness of the unit that was formed. Previous research has differentiated two components of intra-group conflict:

- Relationship conflict – This is the interpersonal incompatibilities between team members such as annoyance and animosity
- Task conflict – This occurs when members convey divergent ideas and opinions about specific aspects related to task accomplishment

Team cohesion is viewed as a general indicator of synergistic group interaction—or process. Furthermore, cohesion has been linked to greater coordination during team-tasks as well as improved satisfaction, productivity, and group interactions. Team efficacy refers to team members' perceptions of task-specific team competence. This construct is thought to create a sense of confidence within the team that enables the group to persevere when faced with hardship. According to Hackman (2002), there are also 5 conditions that research has shown to optimize the effectiveness of the team:

1. Real Team – Stability in the group membership over time
2. Compelling Direction – A clear purpose that relies on end goals
3. Enabling Structure – The groups dynamic must be producing good, not bad
4. Social Support – The group must have a system to collaborate properly
5. Coaching – Opportunities for a coach to give help

The Aristotle project, a multi-year initiative by Google Inc. aimed at defining the characteristics of an ideal team in the workplace, has found somewhat similar conditions for group effectiveness. They found that by far, most important factor is psychological safety. The other key factors in productivity are dependability, structure and clarity, personal meaning, and each team member feeling like they have an impact.

== Work teams ==
Work teams (also referred to as production and service teams) are continuing work units responsible for producing goods or providing services for the organization. Their membership is typically stable, usually full-time, and well-defined. These teams are traditionally directed by a supervisor who mandates what work is done, who does it, and in what manner is it executed. Work teams are effectively used in manufacturing sectors such as mining and apparel and service based sectors such as accounting which utilize audit teams.

== Self-managed work teams ==
Self-managed work teams (also referred to as autonomous work groups) allow their members to make a greater contribution at work and constitute a significant competitive advantage for the organization. These work teams determine how they will accomplish the objectives they are mandated to achieve and decide what route they will take to complete the current assignment. Self-managed work teams are granted the responsibility of planning, scheduling, organizing, directing, controlling and evaluating their own work process. They also select their own members and evaluate the members' performance. Self-managed work teams have been favored for their effectiveness over traditionally managed teams due their ability to enhance productivity, costs, customer service, quality, and safety. Self-managed work teams do not always have positive results, however. These teams can be expensive to start, have the potential for the greatest conflict, and are often difficult to monitor the progress of. The move to self-managed work teams at Levi Strauss & Co. in the 1990s pitted highly skilled and efficient workers against their slower counterparts, who the faster workers did not feel were sufficiently contributing to the team.

== Parallel teams ==
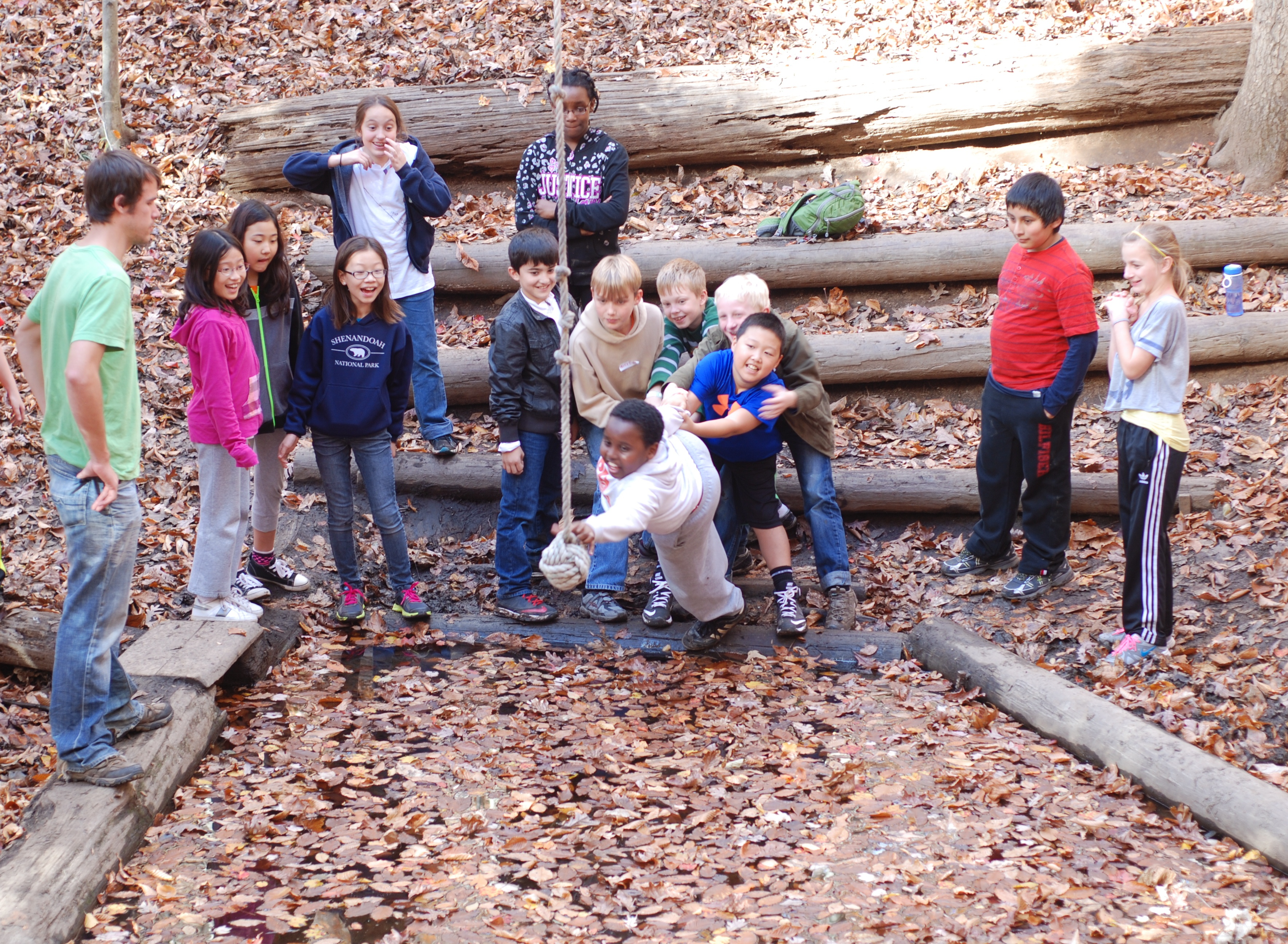
Parallel team solving a problem (2013)

Parallel teams (also referred to as advice and involvement teams) pull together people from different work units or jobs to perform functions that the regular organization is not equipped to perform well. These teams are given limited authority and can only make recommendations to individuals higher in the organizational hierarchy. Parallel teams are used for solving problems and activities that are in need of revision or improvement. Examples of parallel teams are quality circles, task forces, quality improvement teams, employee involvement groups. The effectiveness of parallel teams is proven by the continuation of their usage and expansion throughout organizations due to their ability to improve quality and increase employee involvement.

== Project teams ==
Project teams (also referred to as development teams) produce new products and services for an organization or institution on a one-time or limited basis, of which the copyrights of that new product or service will belong to the establishment that it was made for once it is completed. The task of these teams may vary from just improving a current project, concept or plan to creating an entirely new projects with very few limitations. Projects teams rely on their members being knowledgeable and well versed in many disciplines and functions, as this allows them to complete the task effectively. Once a project is completed, the team either disbands and are individually moved to other special functions or moves on to other projects and tasks that they as a unit can accomplish or develop. A common example of project teams are cross-functional teams. A project team's effectiveness is associated with the speed with which they are able to create and develop new products and services which reduces time spent on individual projects.

== Management teams ==
Management teams (also referred to as action and negotiation teams) are responsible for the coordination and direction of a division within an institution or organization during various assigned projects and functional, operational and/or strategic tasks and initiatives. Management teams are responsible for the total performance of the division they oversee with regards to day-to-day operations, delegation of tasks and the supervision of employees. The authority of these teams are based on the members position on the company's or institution's organizational chart. These management teams are constructed of managers from different divisions (e.g. Vice President of Marketing, Assistant Director of Operations). An example of management teams are executive management teams, which consists of members at the top of the organization's hierarchy, such as chief executive officer, board of directors, board of trustees, etc., who establish the strategic initiatives that a company will undertake over a long term period (~ 3–5 years). Management teams have been effective by using their expertise to aid companies in adjusting to the current landscape of a global economy, which helps them compete with their rivals in their respective markets, produce unique initiatives that sets them apart from their rivals and empower the employees who are responsible for the success of the organization or institution.

== See also ==
- Equity theory
- Group behaviour
- Group conflict
- Group dynamics
- Industrial and organizational psychology
- Industrial sociology
- Management
- Organizational behavior
- Project management
- Scientific management
- Socionics
- Team building
- Team composition
- Work motivation
