= Functional diversity (organizational) =

Functional diversity encapsulates the cognitive resource diversity theory, which is the idea that diversity of cognitive resources promotes creativity and innovation, problem solving capacity, and organizational flexibility. Functionally diverse teams “consist of individuals with a variety of educational and training backgrounds working together." This differs from social diversity, which in accordance with the similarity attraction (homophily) paradigm, is the idea that individuals who are more similar together are able to work together more effectively. There is a degree of ambiguity in academic literature in the definition of functional and social diversity due to many studies in this matter either focusing on one or the other or mashing up the different characteristics. Psychologists, economists, sociologists have conducted numerous studies on diversity within groups to examine the effects on group performance. There are debates about benefits and costs of working in a functionally diverse groups. Milliken and Martins (1996) concluded that “diversity appears to be a double-edged sword”.

== Classification ==
Functional diversity can be classified in:

Dominant functional diversity
the extent to which team members differ in the functional areas within which they have spent the greater part of their careers. It is calculated by determining the functional areas within which team members have spent the greater part of their careers, and the applying some version of Blau’s or Shannon’s diversity index.
Functional background diversity
the degree to which team members differ in their functional background. It is calculated by measuring, for each team member, the amount of time spent in each functional area, and the calculating the average Euclidean distance between pairs of team members in the amount of time spent in each function.
Functional assignment diversity
the extent to which the current functional assignment of each team member cover some range of functional areas, ignoring the past experiences of the team members. It is computed by assigning each team member to one functional area on the basis of job title or responsibilities, and the applying some version of Blau’s or Shannon’s diversity index.
Intrapersonal Functional Diversity
The extent to which each team member as an individual is a narrow functional specialist or a generalists whose work experience span different functional backgrounds. It is computed as
$$\dfrac{\sum_{i=1}^n \left( 1 - \sum_{j=1}^m p_{ij}^2 \right)}{n}$$
where $p_{ij}$ is the percentage of manager $i$'s total years of experience spent in the $j$th functional area, $n$ is the number of team members and $m$ is the number of functional areas.

== Benefits ==
According to Kent & McGrath (1969) diversity in the laboratory or classroom setting can improve “the quality of a given decision or the creativity of an idea”. Functionally diverse teams prevent excessive homogeneity, which has been found to be directly related to highly cohesive groups where groupthink, a phenomenon where there is an absence of critical thinking in a group partly caused by excessive preoccupation with maintaining cohesiveness, may occur. Most examples of groupthink in the literature have been negative and could potentially have disastrous consequences. There is also a higher level of critical analysis of decision issues and alternatives in diverse teams due to minority views. Regardless of whether the minority view prevailed, the presence of minority views encouraged consideration of alternative decisions and thorough examination of assumptions and implications of alternative scenarios. In dealing with cognitive or creative tasks, functional diversity proved to helpful. Diversity in educational backgrounds and level of knowledge can lead to an innovative idea. In a meta-analysis conducted by Bell, Villado, Lukasik, and Briggs (2011), the team found out that functional background variety diversity was positive for design and product development teams. A team composed of members from diverse functional backgrounds are exposed to broader range of perspectives and knowledge. Functionally diverse teams can spread its members across different functions, which could lead to positive team performance (Chattopadhyay, Glick, Miller & Huber, 1999). In addition, there is an argument that functional diversity in teams would make the system “less determinant, less standardized, and therefore more fluid,” which is likely to allow an organization to react to changing environments.

=== Creative tasks ===
IDEO, a design firm, successfully integrates engineering and design to produce creative innovation. Founder David Kelly on a 60 minutes segment mentioned the importance of diversity in tasks. Functional diversity allow fresh perspective, broader scope to tasks, and "obvious" questions to be asked. “IDEO’s success rests not just on the abilities of individual designers, but even more on an overall approach to design that emphasizes group work and cross-functional development.”

== Costs ==
Although there has been much research on the benefits of functional diversity in groups, much of the early research was carried out in a laboratory or classroom setting as opposed to examining intact working groups within an organizational context. Contrary to the improved performance seen in laboratory settings, group diversity has seen substantially less benefits in intact working groups. Evidence from research on intact working groups has painted a less optimistic view of the benefits of diversity in groups due to possible dysfunctional elements such as increased stereotyping, in-group/out-group effects, dysfunctional conflict, and turnover. Studies suggest that diversity in attitudes and values may be associated with negative outcomes.

More recent studies have been carried out to uncover when and specifically how functional diversity influences team innovation and if other factors play moderating roles in this relationship. One of these is an examination of 96 research and development teams by Cheung, Gong, Wang, Zhou and Shi in 2016. The team sought to reconcile the mixed results on the relationship between functional diversity and team innovation and the results showed that knowledge sharing, and subsequent team innovation do not necessarily occur in functionally diverse teams. Their findings revealed that functional diversity had a negative indirect relationship with team innovation via knowledge sharing when affect-based trust in a team was low, and this relationship became less negative as the level of affect-based trust in a team increased. The relationship however was not significant when affect-based trust in a team was high. Their conclusion was that affect-based trust in a team moderates the effects of functional diversity on team innovation (via knowledge sharing).

In Ozenir and Booms (2020), an analysis of 37 teams revealed a significant negative relationship between functional diversity and information elaboration, and a significant positive relationship between information elaboration and team innovation. Furthermore, they cited that when the indirect effect of mediation was considered and the information elaboration was controlled for, the direct effect between functional diversity and team innovation became positive and significant.

=== Ineffective teams ===
In a case study by the Harvard Business school, a diverse group of talented individuals came together at Music Games International, a small start-up company looking to release an innovative “music puzzle” game that would serve as educational software for children and as a music entertainment product. In the team, there was a marketing, sales management, and business development expert, an award-winning composer and pianist, an internationally acclaimed composer with substantial experience in electronic/computer compositions, a graduate student in Brain and Cognitive Sciences at MIT, a Music Business Management and Music Production and Engineering dual degree with expertise in computer music applications, and two MBA candidates in the Harvard business school (HBS). Even though each individual on the team was skilled in their area of expertise, the group quickly ran into problems that negatively affected the group’s performance. There were disagreements that ran unresolved and frustrations as meetings became long without accomplishing much. Team members wanted to take the product in different directions causing rifts within the team. A side formed that wanted to market the product to the education industry while the others wanted to market the product to the entertainment industry. One of the members “felt that the greatest divide within the team came from the contrast between the creative impulses of the musicians and the more pragmatic approach of the HBS students.” The lack of cohesion among the team and personality conflicts lead to observable tension and heated discussions. A team member remarked after a few months on the team, "if the team continued to operate as it had so far, it had little chance of putting together a coherent business plan."

== Mechanics ==
The mechanism in which cases appear to give functionally diverse groups improved performance seem to lie within the conflict generated. Task conflict is the conflict that originates from different perspectives on how to complete a task whereas emotional conflict involves different and opposing emotions. Task conflict that was generated from diverse groups had a positive association with cognitive task performance whereas emotional conflict due to conflict with out-group members has been suggested to give groups problems and lead to poor performance. This could be the mechanism behind variability in task performance of functionally diverse workgroups.

Jehn et al. (1999), proposed that diversity could be split into knowledge and perspectives, social category, and value diversity. Knowledge and perspectives could be seen as task conflict and had the greatest positive impact while value diversity had the greatest negative effect on team performance. Evidence supports that value diversity creates the greatest conflicts, probably through emotional conflict. Emotional conflict leads to problems in team cohesiveness and team dynamics, which would in turn have a significant effect on team performance, overriding benefits from increased task conflict.

Williams and O’Reilly (1998), separates task and emotional conflict by discussing the commonly used information and decision-making theory and social categorization theory. The information and decision-making theory predicts that the availability of information due to diverse backgrounds will increase task conflict and produce new perspectives and ideas. The social categorization theory predicts that emotional conflict will stem from in-group/out-group effects due to diversity separating a team into smaller groups of similar people. Group members will attempt to make their in-group look better at the expense of the out-group, and similar group members will tend to like each other whereas dissimilar group members will tend not to like each other. Job stress that is likely to come from emotional conflict also had a detrimental effect on performance.

In a case study conducted by Rivera (2012) for hiring new employees in elite professional service firms, there was evidence that showed that similarity attributes were considered by the hiring managers and committee during the hiring process. After passing the initial interview requirements, employers would seek out candidates who not only meet the technical requirements of the job (for example, educational or relevant work experience), but would also pick potential employees who appear like themselves in areas such as experiences, academic achievements, leisure pursuits, and self-presentation styles. These attributes that were discovered were done during the discussion phase of the interview and would often be the greatest factor in whether a potential employee would be hired, even more so than the credentials on their resume. The most notable reason for this was due to the nature of the businesses being elite service firms that are client focused. Employers preferred to hire employees they could trust, as it was considered more important than technical skills, which employers believed could be trained into new hires over time.

Functional diversity in its implicit form within teams is found to have varied effects on innovation and team productivity. Real-world teams still needed to have positive affect-based trust to nourish innovation and operate with higher productivity. Studies exploring the positive and negative effects of functional diversity have identified nuances in how it is measured and perceived. For example, Bunderson and Sutcliffe (2002) established that functional diversity within a team composed of narrow specializations is detrimental to productivity whereas a team of broader specialties will tend to work together better and hence operate at a higher level of innovation.

Functional diversity is advantageous to teams when the intention behind pursuing a high degree is a conscious effort to establish a high-performing team. When the environment in a functionally diverse team is conducive to information sharing and interpersonal dynamics are set up to be successful, the scale of innovation and productivity will soar than in a non-diverse team. Comparison is only possible with such levels of parity in internal dynamics and skill set combination and how organizational structure is formed. As a result, if there is a conscious effort to enable a team to be functionally diverse while establishing interpersonal dynamics and making the perspectives broader to account for different personas to co-exist there is significant value in innovation and productivity improvement. Real-world implications of functional diversity will thus be managed by the intentionality of the existence of diversity and supporting nuances that drive team, personal dynamics, and broadness of specialization of skillset.

== See also ==
- Team Composition
- Interdisciplinarity
- Holism in science
- Integrative learning
- Interdiscipline
- Interprofessional education
- Multidisciplinarity
- Systems thinking
- Systems theory
- Transdisciplinarity
- Science of Team Science
