= Team conflict =

Concept in conflict studies

Team conflict is conflict within a team. Conflicts may be caused by differing goals, values or perceptions of the team members. Team conflict is intragroup conflict.

== Types of conflicts ==
"Hot conflicts" have three common symptoms:

- Team members persist in arguing the same points.
- When the team reaches an impasse, talks gets personal. Accusations may be spoken out loud, and members may speculate privately about one another's motives.
- Once negative attributions take hold, emotions flare and progress halts.

Allen C. Amason, of Mississippi State University, studied conflict and its role in decision-making. He stated that there are two kinds of conflict: cognitive — conflict based upon issues, ideas, processes or principles, and affective — conflict based upon personalities, emotions or values.

Researcher Thomas K. Capozzoli (1995) classified conflicts by whether the outcome was constructive or destructive. Conflicts are constructive when people change and grow personally from the conflict; the conflict results in a solution to a problem; the involvement of everyone affected by the conflict is increased; the team becomes more cohesive. Conflicts are destructive when no decision is reached and problem still exists; energy is diverted away from productive activities; the morale of the team members goes down; the team becomes divided.

=== Workplace conflict ===
Team conflict is common in the workplace where it may hinder productivity and the achievement of team goals. If management of conflict is not effective, it can disrupt group processes, but successfully-managed conflict may benefit the group.

== "Faultlines" in groups ==
Lau and Murnighan identify what they call "faultlines" as a source of conflicts within groups. As a supplement to traditional approaches of research that focused on diversity characterized by variance of demographic attributes across a population, faultlines are hypothetical dividing lines that split groups into multiple sets of subgroups with each set based on different attributes. These attributes may be demographics, but also may be characteristics such as personal values or personalities. This work builds on work in social identity theory and self-categorization theory, which explains the ways in which individuals favor other individuals with whom they share a common identity; per this model, individuals evaluate members of their subgroups more positively than other members of the larger group, which may lead to conflict when disagreements occur across faultlines. Lau and Murnighan identify three compositional factors for faultlines within a group:

1. The number of individual attributes apparent to group members
2. Their alignment
3. The number of potentially homogenous subgroups

A group has weak faultlines if subgroups contain different members across sets, and strong faultlines if group members fall in the same groups across sets. For example, a team composed half of young male entry-level employees and half of older female executives has strong faultlines because each member falls in subgroups with the same other members across all three demographic characteristics.

Subsequent work on the impact of these embedded subgroups, called "factions" when overlap in subgroups is structured into teams, has found significant negative impacts on group productivity stemming from task conflict, emotional conflict, and behavioral disintegration. Faultlines were found to better predict variance in a variety of group self-perception metrics than traditional metrics of group heterogeneity, including perceptions of team-learning, psychological safety, satisfaction, and expected performance.

While the concept of faultlines model may be seen as presenting diversity as a challenge to be overcome, diversity has been found to contribute significantly to team outcomes under certain circumstances. Respectful inclusion of the opinions of minority members can lead to increased creativity as the group incorporates their distinct perspectives. The challenges associated with inclusivity are not insubstantial, and may require strong leadership and norms of tolerance and respect to overcome.

== Six-step procedure for dealing with conflict in teams ==
Conflict is a normal part of working in teams, because it brings creativity and helps avoid groupthink. However, too much conflict can stop teams for doing their work and certain procedures should be followed to get back on track. Guffey, Rhodes, and Rogin describe their six-step process for dealing with conflict in teams:

1. Listen: In order for everyone to understand the problem.
2. Understand the other's point of view: Active listening makes understanding the other's position easier. Show this by asking questions.
3. Show a concern for the relationship: Focus on the problem, not the person. Show that his or her needs are cared for and an overall willingness to resolve the conflict.
4. Look for common ground: Identify both sides' interest and see what you have in common.
5. Invent new problem-solving options: Brainstorm on new ways to solve the conflict and be sure to be open to new suggestions.
6. Reach an agreement on what's fair: Find a middle ground of whats fair and choose the best options after weighing the possible solutions.
