= Input–process–output model of teams =

The input–process–output (IPO) model of teams provides a framework for conceptualizing teams.

The IPO model suggests that many factors influence a team's productivity and cohesiveness. It "provides a way to understand how teams perform, and how to maximize their performance".

The IPO model of teams is a systems theory, as it rests on the assumption that a team is more than one-to-one relationships between variables, and more than the sum of its members. It suggests that there are interactions and feedback between many contributing factors. Inputs are the conditions that exist prior to group activity, whereas processes are the interactions among group members. Outputs are the results of group activity that are valued by the team or the organization.

== Inputs ==
Inputs include any antecedent factors such as organizational context, task characteristics, and team composition that may influence the team itself, directly or indirectly.

As written by Forsyth (2010), inputs can include individual-level factors, team-level factors, and environmental-level factors.

- Individual-level factors: team members’ personality traits, strengths, weaknesses, preferences, dislikes
- Team-level factors: the resources the team has access to, how large the team is, how much time the team spends together, how close the team members are
- Environmental factors: how the team works with other teams, whether the team is part of an organization

== Processes ==
Processes are operations and activities that mediate the relationship between the input factors and the team's outcomes.

Processes include group norms, as well as a group’s decision making process, level of communication, coordination, and cohesion.

Specifically, processes can be things such as:

- Steps taken to plan activities
- Initiating actions
- Monitoring resources
- Monitoring progress
- Maintenance of interpersonal relationships
- Dealing with conflict
- Members' sense of commitment to the team

== Outputs ==
Outputs are the consequences of the team's actions or activities. Most often this refers to the team's tangible output – what they made, achieved, or accomplished. Whether the team wins or loses, whether their product is of adequate quality, and whether they were successful in completing their goals efficiently are all questions of tangible outcome.

Other outcomes are also important, such as changes in the team's cohesiveness, the degree to which the team learns to be prepared for future tasks, the uniqueness of the team’s solution, and whether it increases in efficiency through practice.

Team outputs were also categorized as productivity/performance, member satisfaction, and innovation by Landy & Conte (2009).

== Limitations ==
Although the IPO model of teams has proven to be useful, it is important to consider the limitations of this model as well. Forsyth (2010) outlined three limitations of the IPO model:

- The IPO model is too simplistic and does not accurately account for all the complex interactions that influence how a team performs.
- Some of the “processes” are not actually processes, but rather characteristics of a team that develop and emerge as the team works together. They are not events that happen, but merely mediators of the input-output relationship.
- The IPO model should consider that teamwork influences constitute a feedback loop in which reversal causal sequences are also possible. The outputs of a team’s actions can provide the input for their next action.
