= Educational equity =

Measure of distributive justice and inclusion in education

Educational equity, also known as equity in education, is a measure of equity in education. Educational equity depends on two main factors. The first is distributive justice, which implies that factors specific to one's personal conditions should not interfere with the potential of academic success. The second factor is inclusion, which refers to a comprehensive standard that applies to everyone in a certain education system. These two factors are closely related and depend on each other for an educational system's success. Education equity can include the study of excellence and equity.

Educational equity's growing importance is based on the premise that a person's level of education directly correlates with their quality of life and that an academic system that practices educational equity is thus a strong foundation for a fair and thriving society. But inequity in education is hard to avoid because of inequities in socioeconomic standing, race, gender, and disability. Educational equity also operates in a historical context. History can shape outcomes in education systems.

Those without the skills to participate socially and economically in society generate higher costs of healthcare, income support, child welfare and social security.

== Equity vs. equality ==
=== Equity ===
Equity is equality of outcome for all subgroups in society. Equity proponents believe that some are at a larger disadvantage than others and aims to compensate for this to ensure that everyone can attain the same lifestyle. Examples of this are: "When libraries offer literacy programs, when schools offer courses in English as a second language, and when foundations target scholarships to students from poor families, they operationalize a belief in equity of access as fairness and as justice". Equity recognizes this uneven playing field and aims to take extra measures by giving those in need more than those who are not. Equity aims to achieve equal outcomes for groups, also called substantive equality. Equity aims to ensure that everyone's lifestyle is equal, even if that requires unequal distribution of access and goods. Social justice leaders in education strive to ensure equitable outcomes for their students. Differential outcomes between groups and individuals can occur as a function of biology/psychology and not social background; appropriate 'equitable' resource apportionment would therefore appear to require a clear distinction between where differential performance is caused by social background and where it is caused by biological/psychological factors. The extensive literature on the subject of equity typically does make such a distinction.

=== Equality of opportunity ===
Equality of opportunity in education occurs when the chances only depend on meritocracy and do not depend on characteristics such as sex, ethnicity, race, caste, relatives or friends, religion. The American Library Association defines equality as "access to channels of communication and sources of information that is made available on even terms to all". On this definition, no one has an unfair advantage. Everyone has equal opportunities and accessibility and is then free to do what they please. This is not to say that everyone is then inherently equal. Some people may choose to seize opportunities while others let them pass.

== Educational tracking ==
Tracking systems are selective measures to find students at different educational levels. They are created to increase education's efficiency. They allow more or less homogeneous groups of students to receive education that suits their skills. Tracking can affect educational equity if the selection process is biased and children with certain backgrounds are structurally put on lower tracks. Students can be viewed and treated differently depending on their track, generating unequal achievement levels and restricting access to higher tracks and higher education. The quality of teaching and curricula vary between tracks and those on lower tracks may be disadvantaged with inferior resources, teachers, etc. In many cases, tracking stunts students who may develop the ability to excel past their original placement.

=== Tracking systems ===
The type of tracking has impact on the level of educational equity, which is especially determined by the degree in which the system is differentiated. Less differentiated systems, such as standardized comprehensive schools, reach higher levels of equity in comparison to more differentiated, or tracked, systems.

Within the tracked systems, the kind of differentiation matters as well for educational equity. Differentiation of schools could be organized externally or internally. External differentiation means that tracks are separated in different schools. Certain schools follow a certain track, which prepares students for academic or professional education, or for career or vocational education. This form is less beneficial for educational equity than internal differentiation or course-by-course tracking. Internal tracking means that, within a single school, courses are instructed at different levels, which is a less rigid kind of tracking that allows for more mobility.

The organization of the tracking systems themselves is also important for its effect on educational equity. For both differentiation systems, a higher number of tracks and a smaller number of students per track is granting more educational equity. In addition, the effects of tracking are less rigid and have a smaller impact on equity if the students are located in tracks when they are older. The earlier the students undergo educational selection, the less mobile they are to develop their abilities and the less they can benefit from peer effects.

== Socio-economic equity in education ==
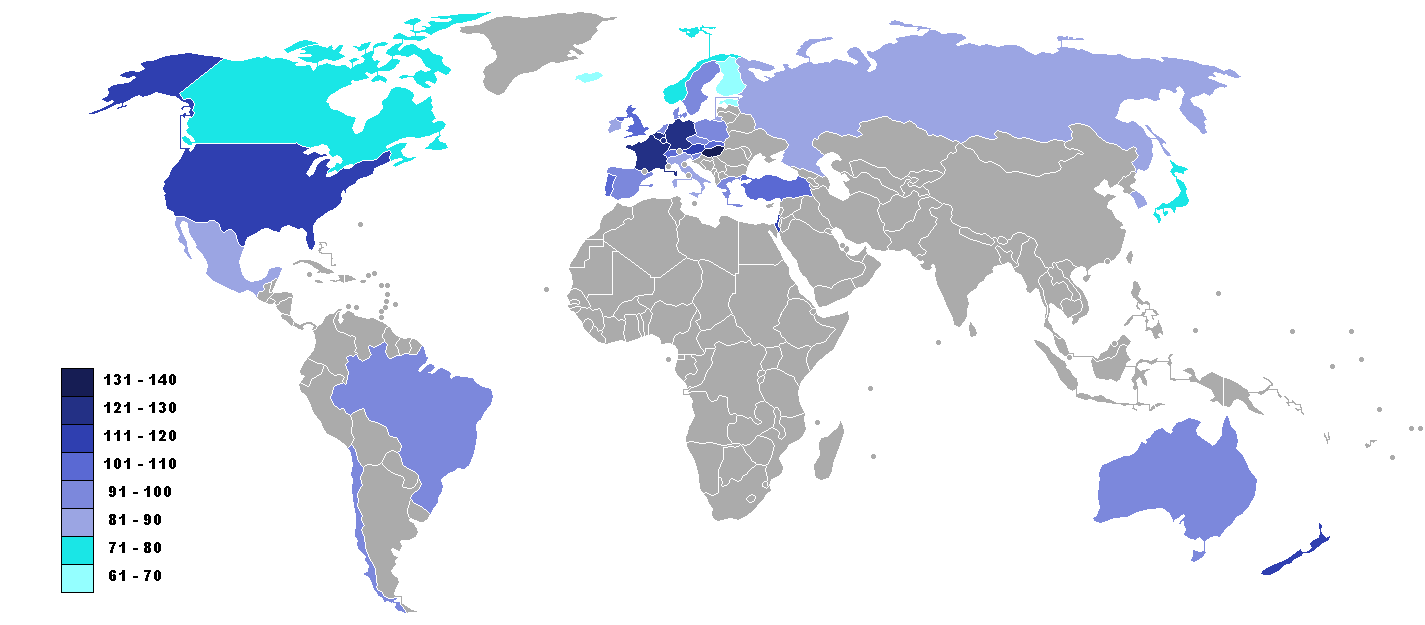
Education equality on countries that are members of the OECD. The numbers correspond to the average difference of points in the results of the PISA test 2012 of a student from a high socio-economic level and a student from a low socio-economic level in their respective country. A higher number represents a more unequal education result whilst a smaller number indicates a more equal education result.

=== Income and class ===
Income has always played an important role in shaping academic success. Those who come from a family of a higher socioeconomic status (SES) are privileged with more opportunities than those of lower SES. Those who come from a higher SES can afford things like better tutors, rigorous SAT/ACT prep classes, impressive summer programs, and so on. Parents generally feel more comfortable intervening on behalf of their children to acquire better grades or more qualified teachers (Levitsky). Parents of a higher SES are more willing to donate large sums of money to a certain institution to better improve their child's chances of acceptance, along with other extravagant measures. This creates an unfair advantage and distinct class barrier.

=== Factors contributing to socioeconomic achievement gaps ===
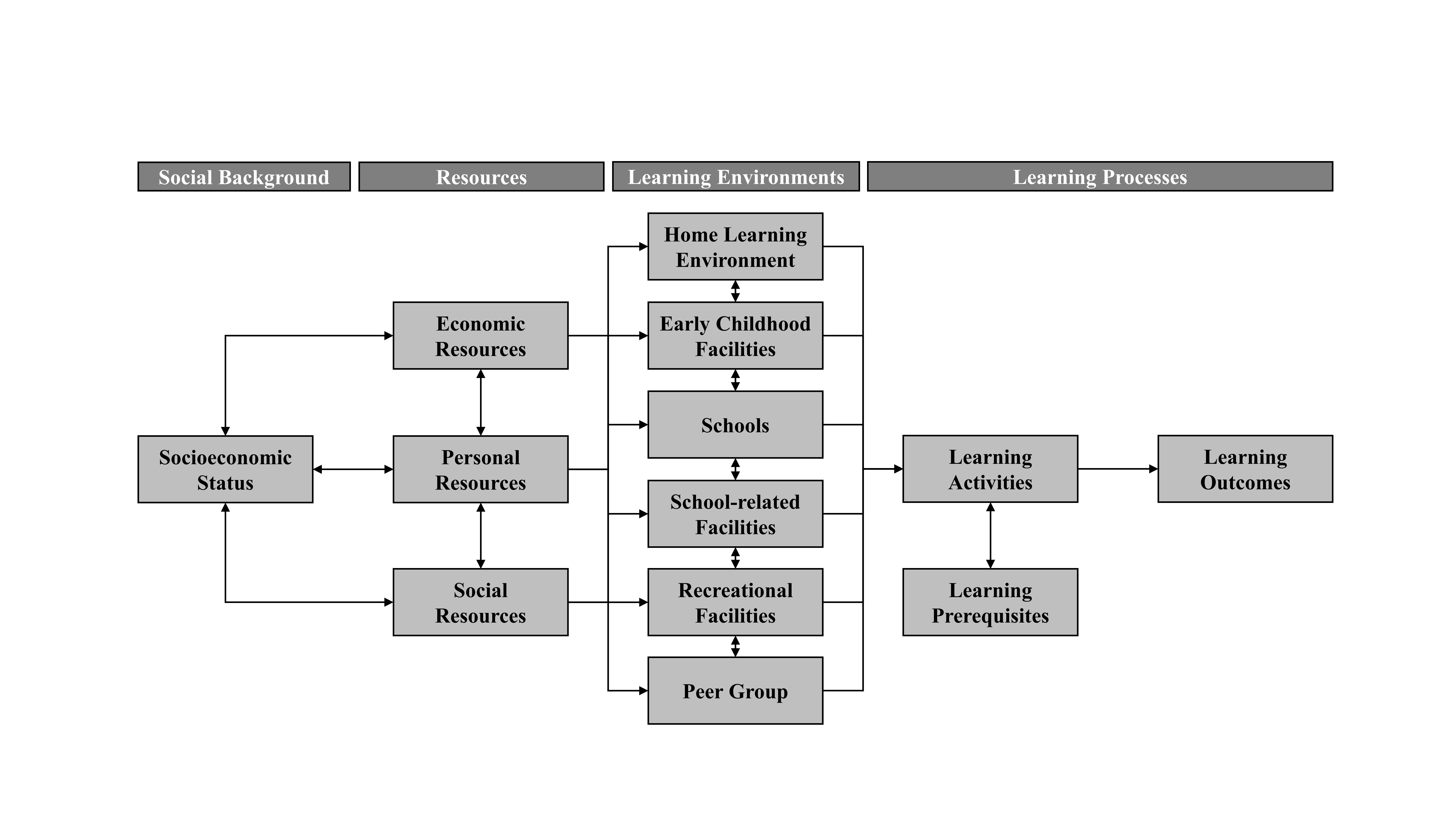
Theoretical model of mediating mechanisms between social background and learning outcomes

A broad range of factors contributes to the emergence of socioeconomic achievement gaps. The interaction of different aspects of socialization is outlined in the model of mediating mechanisms between social background and learning outcomes. The model describes a multi-step mediation process. Socially privileged families have more economic, personal, and social resources available than socially disadvantaged families. Differences in family resources result in differences in the learning environments experienced by children. Children with various social backgrounds experience different home learning environments, attend different early childhood facilities, schools, school-related facilities, and recreational facilities, and have different peer groups. Due to these differences in learning environments, children with various social backgrounds carry out different learning activities and develop different learning prerequisites.

=== Costs of education ===
The extraordinarily high cost of the many prestigious high schools and universities in the United States makes an attempt at a "level playing field" for all students not so level. High-achieving low-income students do not have the means to attend selective schools that better prepare a student for later success. Because of this, low-income students do not even attempt to apply to the top-tier schools for which they are more than qualified. In addition, neighborhoods generally segregated by class leave lower-income students in lower-quality schools. For higher-quality schooling, students in low-income areas would have to take public transport which they cannot pay for. Fewer than 30 percent of students in the bottom quarter of incomes even enroll in a four-year school and among that group, fewer than half graduate.

== Racial equity in education ==
From a scientific point of view, humanity is a single species. Nevertheless, the term racial group is enshrined in legislation, and phrases such as race equality and race relations are in widespread official use. A report by Association of Teachers and Lecturers discussed the racial, religious or cultural terminology used in the UK educational system. Racial equity in education means the assignment of students to public schools and within schools without regard to their race. This includes providing students with a full opportunity for participation in all educational programs regardless of their race.

The educational system and its response to racial concerns in education vary from country to country. Below are some examples of countries that have to deal with racial discrimination in education.

- US Department of Education: The Commission on Equity and Excellence in Education issued a seminal report in 2013, a blueprint for making the dream of equity, and a world-class education, for each and every American child a reality.

The struggle for equality of access to formal education and equality of excellent educational outcomes is part of the history of education in this country and is tied up with the economic, political, social history of the peoples who are part of it. From the beginning of this nation, there were many barriers to the schooling and education of girls and racial, national origin, and language groups not from the dominant culture. Approaches and resources for achieving equality and equity in the public schooling of girls and ethnic, racial, and language minority groups are still evolving.

- Asia-Pacific Region: Globalization of the economy, increasingly diverse and interconnected populations, and rapid technological change are posing new and demanding challenges to individuals and societies alike. School systems are rethinking the knowledge and skills students need for success, and the educational strategies and systems required for all children to achieve them. Within the Asia-Pacific region, for example, Korea, Shanghai-China, and Japan are examples of Asian education systems that have climbed the ladder to the top in both quality and equity indicators.
- South Africa: A major task of South Africa's new government in 1994 was to promote racial equity in the state education system. During the apartheid era, which began when the National Party won control of Parliament in 1948 and ended with a negotiated settlement more than four decades later, the provision of education was racially unequal by design and resources were lavished on schools serving white students while schools serving the black majority were systematically deprived of qualified teachers, physical resources and teaching aids such as textbook and stationery. A study evaluated progress towards racial equity after end of apartheid using three distinct concepts: equal treatment, equal educational opportunity, and educational adequacy. The authors find that the country has succeeded in establishing racial equity defined as equal treatment, primarily through race-blind policies for allocating state funds for schools. Progress measured by the other two criteria, however, has been constrained by the legacy of apartheid, including poor facilities and lack of human capacity in schools serving black students, and by policies such as school fees.

=== Race equality in education - a survey report by England ===
The local authorities in England gave a survey report Race equality in education in November 2005. This report is based on visits by Her Majesty.s Inspectors (HMIs) and additional inspectors to 12 LEAs and 50 schools in England between summer term 2003 to spring term 2005. This report illustrates good practice on race equality in education in a sample of schools and local education authorities (LEAs) surveyed between the summer of 2003 and the spring of 2005. The survey focused on schools and LEAs that were involved effectively in race equality in education. Four areas were examined by inspectors: improving standards and achievement amongst groups of pupils, with reference to the Race Relations (Amendment) Act 2000 (RRAA); the incorporation of race equality concepts into the curriculum in schools; the handling and reporting of race-related incidents in schools; the work of schools and LEAs in improving links with local minority ethnic communities.

=== The equity and excellence commission - US education ===
Carol D. Lee described the rationale for a special theme issue, "Reconceptualizing Race and Ethnicity in Educational Research." The rationale includes the historical and contemporary ways that cultural differences have been positioned in educational research and the need for more nuanced and complex analyses of ethnicity and race.

=== Race in education: an argument for integrative analysis ===
Education literature tends to treat race, social class, and gender as separate issues. A review of a sample of education literature from four academic journals, spanning ten years, sought to determine how much these status groups were integrated. The study found little integration. The study then provided a research example on cooperative learning to illustrate how attention to only one status group oversimplifies the analysis of student behavior in school. From findings of studies integrating race and class, and race and gender, the study argues that attending only to race, in this example, oversimplifies behavior analysis and may help perpetuate gender and class biases. To determine to what extent race, social class, and gender are integrated in the education literature, the study examined a sample of literature published over a ten-year period and 30 articles focused primarily on race, or on school issues related directly to race, such as desegregation.

=== Higher education ===
Higher education plays a vital role in preparing students for the employment market and active citizenship both nationally and internationally. By embedding race equality in teaching and learning, institutions can ensure that they acknowledge the experiences and values of all students, including minority ethnic and international students. Universities Scotland first published the Race Equality Toolkit: learning and teaching in 2006 in response to strong demand from the universities in Scotland for guidance on meeting their statutory obligations.

== Equity in special education ==
Educational equity also includes factors such as accessibility, accommodation, tackling language barriers and improve inclusion. Simplification of educational standards in special education is also called modification.

== Gender equity in education ==
Gender discrimination in education has been very evident and underlying problem in many countries, especially in developing countries where cultural and societal stigma continue to hinder growth and prosperity for women. Global Campaign for Education followed a survey called "Gender Discrimination in Violation of Rights of Women and Girls" states that one tenth of girls in primary school are 'unhappy' and this number increases to one fifth by the time they reach secondary schools with stated reasons including harassment, limitations to freedom, and less opportunities compared to boys. Right to education is a human right. It promotes individual freedom and empowerment and yields important development benefits." The '4A' framework on the Right to Education encompasses availability, accessibility, acceptability and adaptability as fundamental to the institution of education. Girls in many underdeveloped countries are denied secondary education, countries such as Sudan, Somalia, Thailand and Afghanistan face the highest of inequity when it comes to gender bias.

Single-sex education results in segregation between genders.

Gender-based inequity in education occurs in developed countries. Gender equity in education refers to both male and female concerns. In OECD women are overrepresented among university degree holders, for ages 25–34 the overrepresentation is around 20%. The college gender gap is worsening.

=== Causes of gender discrimination in education ===
VSO, an independent international development organization that works towards eliminating poverty, published a paper that categorizes the obstacles (or causes) into:

- Community Level Obstacles: This category primarily relates to the bias displayed for education external to the school environment. This includes restraints due to poverty and child labour, socio-economic constraints, lack of parental involvement and community participation. Harmful practices like child marriage and predetermined gender roles are cultural hindrances.
- School and Education System Level Obstacles: Lack of investment in quality education, inappropriate attitudes and behaviors, lack of female teachers as role models and lack of gender-friendly school environment are all factors that promote gender inequity in education.

=== Impact of gender discrimination on the economy ===
Education is universally acknowledged as an essential human right because it highly impacts the socio-economic and cultural aspects of a country. Equity in education increases the work force of the nation, therefore increasing national income, economic productivity, and [gross domestic product]. It reduces fertility and infant mortality, improves child health, increases life expectancy and increases standards of living. These are factors that allow economic stability and growth in the future. Above all, female education can increase output levels and allow countries to attain sustainable development. Equity in education of women also reduces the possibilities of trafficking and exploitation of women. UNESCO also refers gender equity as a major factor that allows for sustainable development.

"Looking at recently-published UN statistics on gender inequality in education, one observes that the overall picture has improved dramatically over the last decade, but progress has not been even (see chart). Although the developing world on average looks likely to hit the UN's gender-inequality target, many parts of Africa are lagging behind. While progress is being made in sub-Saharan Africa in primary education, gender inequality is in fact widening among older children. The ratio of girls enrolled in primary school rose from 85 to 93 per 100 boys between 1999 and 2010, whereas it fell from 83 to 82 and from 67 to 63 at the secondary and tertiary levels."

== Excellence and equity ==
Excellence and equity in education should aim for a balance between excellence and equity according to Carol Ann Tomlinson. It is argued that without such balance the output of the educational system will be compromised through a resource emphasis on excellence since this implies lower resources for issues grounded in social justice. In this context, the tension between the excellence and equity implies a compromise between aiming for conventional notions of excellence and creating maximum opportunities for social justice and inclusion. Some reject the need to balance excellence and equity. Excellence and equity is sometimes used to invoke the notion of equity in education.

=== Equity and quality in education: supporting disadvantaged students and schools–from OECD ===
The report is by the OECD Education Directorate with support from the Asia Society as a background report for the first Asia Society Global Cities Network Symposium, Hong Kong, May 10–12, 2012. Asia Society organized the Global Cities Education Network, a network of urban school systems in North America and Asia to focus on challenges and opportunities for improvement common to them, and to virtually all city education systems. This report presents the key recommendations of the OECD publication Equity and Quality in Education: Supporting Disadvantaged Students and Schools (2012a), which maps out policy levers that can help build high quality and equitable education systems, with a particular focus on North American and Asia-Pacific countries.

== Challenges ==
=== Costs and outcomes ===
While both basic education and higher education have both been improved and expanded in the past 50 years, this has not translated to a more equal society in terms of academics. While the feminist movement has made great strides for women, other groups have not been as fortunate. Generally, social mobility has not increased, while economic inequality has. So, while more students are getting a basic education and even attending universities, a dramatic divide is present and many people are still being left behind.

=== Ambiguity ===
The notion of equity in education is poorly defined and ambiguous. Definitions are often so broad as to be meaningless, and often conflict in meaning. For example; "Educational equity means that each child receives what they need to develop to their full academic and social potential", "Equity in education is when every student receives the resources needed to acquire the basic work skills of reading, writing, and simple arithmetic. It measures educational success in society by its outcome, not the resources poured into it" and "Equity means offering individualized support to students that addresses possible barriers, like poverty or limited transportation".

=== Social integration ===
As increased immigration causes problems in educational equity for some countries, poor social cohesion in other countries is also a major issue. In countries where continued migration causes an issue, the ever-changing social structure of different races makes it difficult to propose a long-term solution to educational equity. On the other hand, many countries with consistent levels of diversity experience long-standing issues of integrating minorities. Challenges for minorities and migrants are often exacerbated as these groups statistically struggle more in terms of lower academic performance and lower socio-economic status.

=== Dumbing down ===
Some criticize educational equity because of grade inflation and dumbing down.

== See also ==
- Brown v. Board of Education - United States Supreme Court case that determined segregating public schools unconstitutional
- Female education
- Gender inequality in curricula
- Right to education
