= Educational leadership =

Teamwork to achieve common educational aims

Educational leadership is the process of enlisting and guiding the talents and energies of teachers, students, and parents toward achieving common educational aims. This term is often used synonymously with "school leadership" in the United States and has supplanted the term "educational management" in the United Kingdom. Several universities in the United States offer graduate degrees in educational leadership.

Certain obstacles to educational leadership can be overcome. A self-assessment technique can help examine equity and justice that affects student diversity, especially with selection of candidates.

== History ==
The term school leadership came into existence in the late 20th century for several reasons. Demands were made on schools for higher levels of pupil achievement, and schools were expected to improve and reform. These expectations were accompanied by calls for accountability at the school level. Maintenance of the status quo was no longer considered acceptable. Administration and management are terms that connote stability through the exercise of control and supervision. The concept of leadership was favored because it conveys dynamism and pro-activity. The principal or school head is commonly thought to be the school leader; however, school leadership may include other persons, such as members of a formal leadership team and other persons who contribute toward the aims of the school.

While school leadership or educational leadership have become popular as replacements for educational administration in recent years, leadership arguably presents only a partial picture of the work of school, division or district, and ministerial or state education agency personnel, not to mention the areas of research explored by university faculty in departments concerned with the operations of schools and educational institutions. For this reason, there may be grounds to question the merits of the term as a catch-all for the field. Rather, the etiology of its use may be found in more generally and con-temporarily experienced neo-liberal social and economic governance models, especially in the United States and the United Kingdom. On this view, the term is understood as having been borrowed from business.

In the United States, the superintendency, or role of the chief school administrator, has undergone many changes since the creation of the position—which is often attributed to the Buffalo Common Council that approved a superintendent on June 9, 1837. The superintendency is about 170 years old with four major role changes from the early 19th century through the first half of the 20th century and into the early years of the 21st century. Initially, the superintendent's main function was clerical in nature and focused on assisting the board of education with day-to-day details of running the school. At the turn of the 20th century, states began to develop common curriculum for public schools with superintendents fulfilling the role of teacher-scholar or master educator who had added an emphasis on curricular and instructional matters to school operations. In the early 20th century, the Industrial Revolution affected the superintendent's role by shifting the emphasis to expert manager with efficiency in handling non-instructional tasks such as budget, facility, and transportation. The release of A Nation at Risk in 1983 directly impacted public school accountability and, ultimately, the superintendency. The early 1980s initiated the change that has continued through today with the superintendent viewed as chief executive officer, including the roles of professional adviser to the board, leader of reforms, manager of resources and communicator to the public.

== Graduate studies ==
The term "educational leadership" is also used to describe programs beyond schools. Leaders in community colleges, proprietary colleges, community-based programs, and universities are also educational leaders.

Some United States university graduate master's and doctoral programs are organized with higher education and adult education programs as a part of an educational leadership department. In these cases, the entire department is charged with educating educational leaders with specific specialization areas such as university leadership, community college leadership, and community-based leadership (as well as school leadership). Masters of education are offered at universities in the United States in traditional and online formats. Some United States graduate programs with a tradition of graduate education in these areas of specialization have separate departments for them. The area of higher education may include areas such as student affairs leadership, academic affairs leadership, community college leadership, community college and university teaching, vocational, adult education and university administration, and educational wings of nongovernmental organizations.

In Europe, similar degrees exist at the University of Bath and Apsley Business School - London, where the focus is on the management systems of education, especially as British schools move away from state funding to semi-autonomous Free Schools and Academies. In fact in these schools, the focus is on traditional MBA disciplines, such as HR, Change Management and Finance. The so-called "Academisation" of British education is highly contentious and political issue with many headteachers resisting moves to what they see as forced privatization. In mainland Europe, Educational Leadership is not taught formally, with senior educationalists having come through academic pathways, not administration

== Literature, research and policy ==
Educational leadership draws upon interdisciplinary literature, generally, but ideally distinguishes itself through its focus on pedagogy, epistemology and human development. In contemporary practice it borrows from political science and business. Debate within the field relates to this tension. Numerous educational leadership theories and perspectives have been presented and explored, such as: (a) instructional leadership; (b) distributed leadership; (c) transformational leadership; (d) social justice leadership; and (e) Teacher leadership. Researchers have explored how different practices and actions impact student achievement, teacher job satisfaction, or other elements related to school improvement. Moreover, researchers continue to investigate the methodology and quality of principal preparation programs.

A number of publications and foundations are devoted to studying the particular requirements of leadership in these settings, and educational leadership is taught as an academic discipline at a number of universities.

Several countries now have explicit policies on school leadership, including policies and budgets for the training and development of school leaders.

In the USA, formal "curriculum audits" are becoming common, in which educational leaders and trained auditors evaluate school leadership and the alignment of curriculum with goals and objectives. Curriculum audits and curriculum mapping were developed by Fenwick W. English in the late 1970s. The educational leaders and auditors who conduct the audits are certified by Phi Delta Kappa. Research shows how educational leadership influences student learning.

A study concludes that factors such as the quality of teaching facilities, academic staff, and school administration staff are the main external factors that indirectly affect students' performance in schools. The leadership of school principals therefore plays an important role in ensuring the quality of the management and the commitment of the teaching staff, which have an indirect impact on the academic performance of students.

A research study discusses how Artificial Intelligence (AI) can be applied in educational leadership to improve decision-making processes. Leveraging data-based insights, automating administrative duties, and facilitating individualized learning are some of the ways in which AI can be employed in educational leadership. The integration of AI in educational leadership has the potential to significantly impact organizational performance.
