= Social justice educational leadership =

Social justice educational leadership emphasizes the belief that all students can and will reach proficiency, without exceptions or excuses, and that schools ought to be organized to advance the equitable learning of all students. Rather than focusing on one group of students who traditionally struggle, or who traditionally succeed, social justice leaders address the learning needs of all students. Social justice educational leadership specifically addresses how differences in race, income, language, ability, gender, and sexual orientation influence the design and effectiveness of learning environments. Social justice leadership draws from inclusive education practices from disability education, but extends the concepts further to support students from diverse groups with a wide range of needs. Through restructuring staff allocation and assessing student progress through disaggregated data, school leaders strive to create schools with equal access and equitable support for all students.

== Goals ==
Social justice educational leaders recognize the role race, ethnicity, family income, ability, gender, and sexual orientation play in predicting student success in school. They commit to creating schools that address societal inequalities by striving to help all students reach academic proficiency. As described by Scheurich and Skrla, "In striving for both equity and excellence... we are aiming for schools in which there are no persistent patterns of differences in academic success or treatment among students grouped by race, ethnicity, culture, neighborhood,the income of parents, or home language. In other words, we are aiming to foster schools that literally serve each and every student really well." (pg. 2).

In order to assess whether these patterns of difference exist, social justice leaders use data tools, such as equity audits, to uncover structures that create differences in student learning outcomes. Equity audits use data such as standardized test scores, discipline rates, family involvement in schools, advanced course participation, special education labeling, at-risk identification, and intervention placement to create profiles of achievement for different student groups in the school. Equity audits reveal achievement gap trends in these areas, in which traditionally marginalized students frequently perform at lower levels than their more privileged peers. Many schools find demographically similar groups of students struggling in academics, language, discipline, graduation rates, and other markers of student success. Once these patterns are identified, social justice leaders equip staff and students with the skills necessary to address discrepancies in student learning needs.

== Student services ==
Social justice leadership builds on concepts of inclusive education, in which services are brought to students in the general classroom environment, rather than pulling students out to a resource room. However, social justice leadership diverges somewhat from inclusive education in that full inclusion at all times is not required. Social justice leaders focus on providing services in classrooms and other flexible spaces that can be accessed by all students, rather than removing students to receive special support in separate classrooms. Social justice leadership also emphasizes assigning students to classrooms and groups using proportional representation. This means that the proportion of students in any classroom or group should match the natural proportion of students from all demographic groups in the school. For example, if 15% of the student body is Latino, then 15% of every classroom should be Latino, only 15% of students who qualify for special education should be Latino and only 15% of students receiving discipline should be Latino.

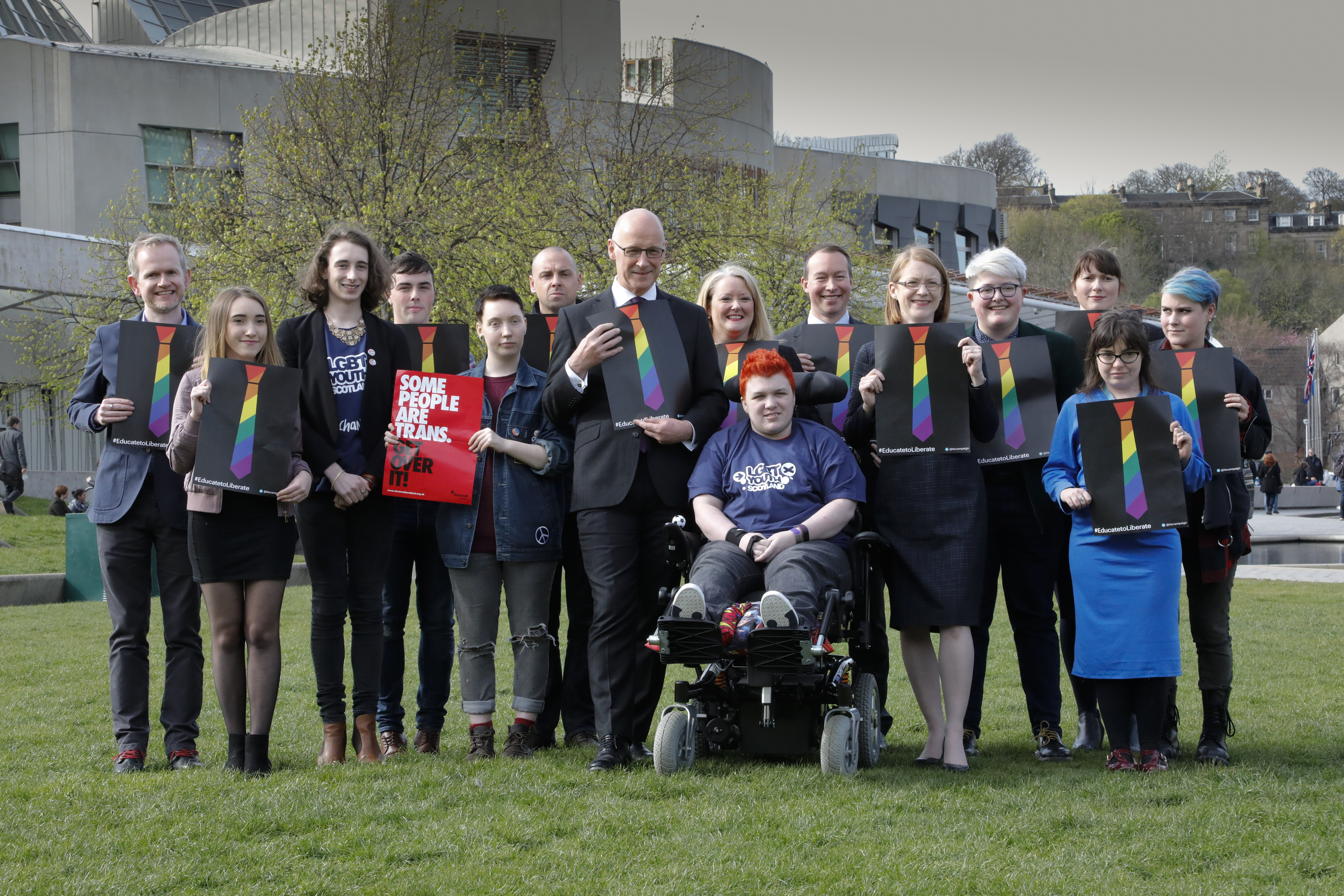
LGBTI inclusive education efforts in Scotland

This method of bringing services to students in general education environments with proportional representation also differs from pull-out models like response to intervention (RtI). Many pull-out models identify students struggling in the classroom and assign them to interventions led by educator specialists outside the general education classroom, rather than by their classroom teachers. For students with more significant needs, pull-out interventions may be from several staff, such as from the Title I teacher, reading interventionist, speech therapist, and social worker, introducing multiple adults and environments to students who would most benefit from consistency. This practice locates the responsibility for educating students with additional needs with the interventionist, rather than the classroom teacher, reducing their efficacy.

== Behavior Management ==
Many school behavior management efforts criminalize small infractions, and maintain a focus on retribution rather than restoration. This, combined with institutional and individual bias, results in a significant overrepresentation of students of color in suspension and expulsion rates. Advocates of social justice in schools purport that exclusionary discipline practices such as suspension and expulsion actively remove students from their school communities and exacerbate feelings of isolation and resentment.

Zero tolerance policies, popularized in the 1990s, have been shown to be ineffective on multiple measures, leaving school leaders looking for alternative strategies to promote safe and orderly learning environments. School leaders focused on social justice are additionally compelled to find strategies that disrupt persisting inequities. This is where restorative justice practices, culturally and linguistically responsive practices (CLRP) and Positive Behavior Interventions and Supports (PBIS) come into play as approaches aiming to address both institutional inequities and the need for safe learning environments.

=== CLR-PBIS ===
PBIS comes with a variety of acronyms. Some schools cut out the “intervention” part, going with the proactive-only PBS system. PBIS is more akin to the three-tiered Response to Intervention system. Others add in the necessity of schoolwide (SW) implementation, dubbing the program SWPBIS. Whatever variation is used (here, PBIS), the primary practices included in the system are listed below. PBIS has shown promise in reducing exclusionary discipline practices overall, but has not shown, on its own, to be effective at reducing the racial disparities in student discipline, and in some cases has even been shown to exacerbate the discrepancies by further reducing discipline referrals for White students, but not for students of color. These criticisms have led to a call for the examination of PBIS, and the integration of CLRP with PBIS in order to address systemic inequities in school discipline.

CLRP has its roots in the work of Gloria Ladson-Billings surrounding culturally relevant pedagogy. Reflecting on this initial thinking, Ladson-Billings more recently stated:

By focusing on student learning and academic achievement versus classroom and behavior management, cultural competence versus cultural assimilation or eradication, and sociopolitical consciousness rather than school-based tasks that have no beyond-school application, I was able to see students take both responsibility for and deep interest in their education. This is the secret behind culturally relevant pedagogy: the ability to link principles of learning with a deep understanding of (and appreciation for) culture.

Other scholars have echoed and built upon this work, giving linguistic relevance footing in the literature, proposing specific practices that may help teachers improve pedagogical relevance, and considering how to best integrate PBIS and CLRP.

==== Key Features of PBIS ====
- Clearly defining behavioral expectations valued by the school community.
- Proactively teaching what those expected behaviors look like in various school settings at least once a year.
- Frequently rewarding students who comply with behavioral expectations.
- Administering a clearly defined continuum of consequences for behavioral violations.
- Continuously collecting and analyzing data to assess students’ responsiveness to the behavioral support provided.

=== Restorative Justice ===
Thalia González describes restorative justice in schools as “an approach to discipline that engages all parties in a balanced practice that brings together all people impacted by an issue or behavior.” Heather Alexander details the roots of these practices, stating, “The principles of restorative justice are consistent with many indigenous traditions, including Canadian First Nations people and the Maori in New Zealand.” She also links restorative justice to “entangled roots in native, religious, and legal communities.” Alexander and González have studied how the underpinnings of various cultural, religious, and judicial practices have made their way into the philosophy and practice of restorative justice. Multiple scholars advocate for restorative practices as an alternative to exclusionary approaches to discipline, both in schools and in the criminal justice system.

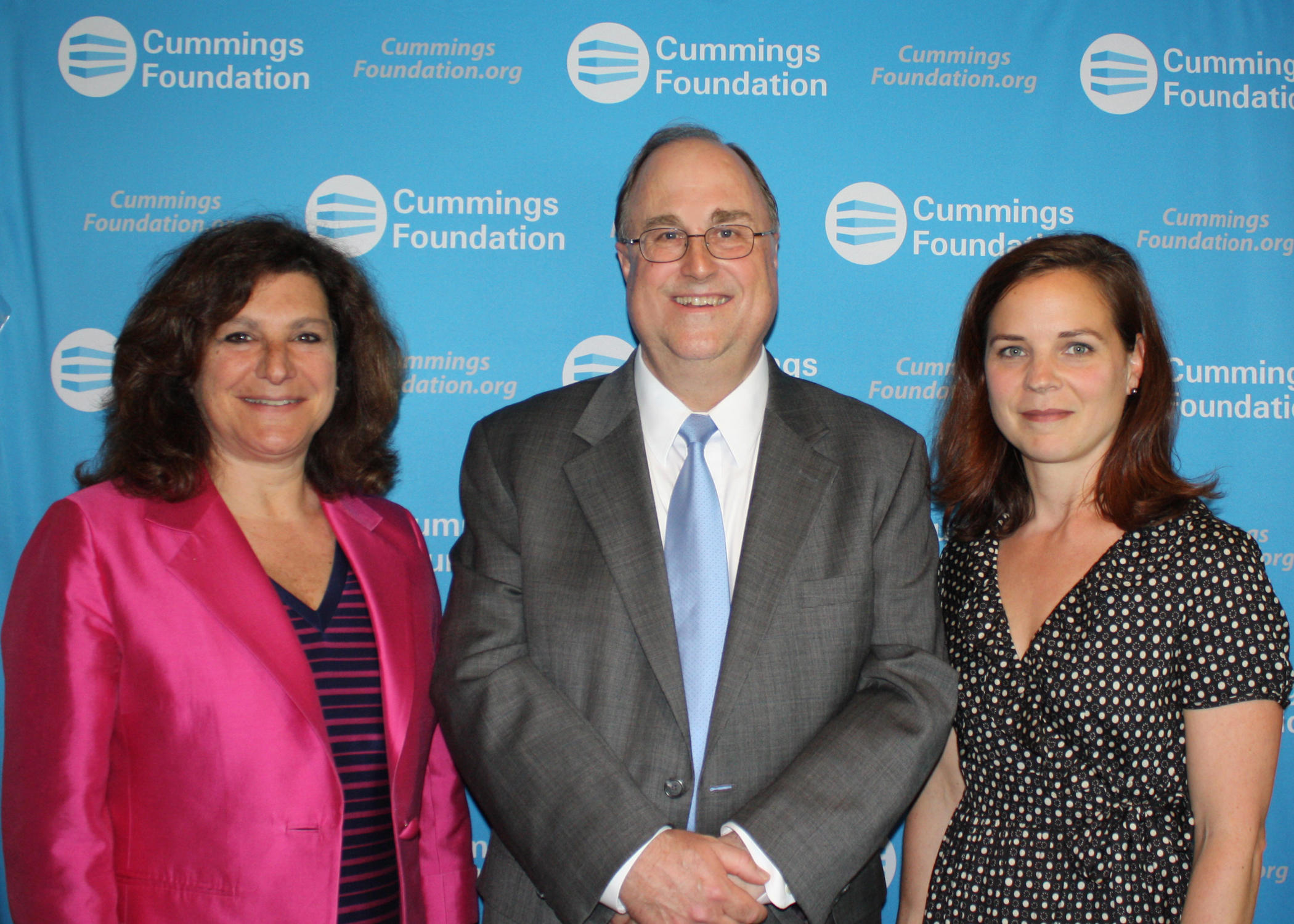
Lauren Rosenzweig Morton and Jennifer Larson Sawin of Communities for Restorative Justice and Joel Swets, executive director of Cummings Foundation which funds non-profits in the New England area.

Many different practices (including, but not limited to: circles, mediation, conferencing, and youth courts) are labeled as restorative justice. Trevor Fronius, et al. describe restorative justice as “a broad term that encompasses a growing social movement to institutionalize peaceful and non-punitive approaches for addressing harm, responding to violations of legal and human rights, and problem solving.” This definition speaks to restorative justice as more of a collection of practices rooted in a common philosophy than a specific “program.” Fronius, et al. go on to say that “the emphasis on the harm done rather than the act is a widely recognized principle across the RJ literature.” and they speak to Dorothy Vaandering's work surrounding “how to use shame as a path toward reintegration rather than stigmatization." Key Principles of Restorative Justice

- Repairing Harm,
- Involving Stakeholders
- Transforming Community Relationships

== Staff allocation ==
Both inclusive and pull-out models seek to reduce the student to teacher ratio, but inclusive models do so by bringing services and staff expertise to students. Thus, social justice leaders need to strategically plan how to effectively allocate their limited staff resources. Rather than having several specialists who work with students with specific needs, leaders structure collaborative teams of classroom teachers, cross-categorical special education teachers, and bilingual resource teachers to support classrooms of students.

== Critiques ==
Social justice educational leadership has been critiqued in several ways. Some feel social justice leadership reinforces the categorization of students, even though the approach emphasizes reducing unnecessary student labeling. The data equity audits focus mostly on identifying inequitable learning outcomes, but few solutions and strategies are suggested for improving these outcomes. By identifying the classroom teacher as responsible for ensuring all students reach proficiency, many teachers feel unsupported in the work and struggle to adequately differentiate lessons for their students. Finally, social justice educational leadership emphasizes proficiency as measured by standardized test scores, which limits the space for innovation and teaching that builds higher-order thinking, which is difficult to measure on standardized tests.

== General references ==
- Capper, C. A., & Frattura, E. (2008). Meeting the needs of students of all abilities: How leaders go beyond inclusion. Newbury Park, CA: Corwin Press.
- Frattura, E., & Capper, C. A. (2007). Leadership for social justice: Transforming schools for all learners. Newbury Park, CA: Corwin Press.
- Johnson, R. S., & Avelar La Salle, R. L. (2012). Data Strategies to uncover and eliminate hidden inequities: The wallpaper effect. Newbury Park, CA: Corwin Press.
- McKenzie, K. B., & Scheurich, J. J. (2004). Equity traps: A useful construct for preparing principals to lead schools that are successful with racially diverse students. Educational Administration Quarterly, 601–632.
- McKinney, S. & Lowenhaupt, R. (2013). New Directions for Socially Just Educational Leadership: Lessons from Disability Studies. In L. Tillman & J. Scheurich (Eds.), Handbook of Research on Educational Leadership for Diversity and Equity. Washington DC: American Educational Research
- Association.
- Scanlon, M. & Lopez, F. (2012). ¡Vamos! How school leaders promote equity and excellence for bilingual students. Educational Administration Quarterly XX(X), 1-43.
- Scheurich, J. J., & Skrla, L. (2003). Leadership for equity and excellence: Creating high-achievement classrooms, schools and districts. Thousand Oaks, CA: Corwin Press.
- Theoharis, G. (2009). The school leaders our children deserve: Seven keys to equity, social justice, and school reform. New York, NY: Teachers College Press.
