= Pedagogy =

Theory and practice of education

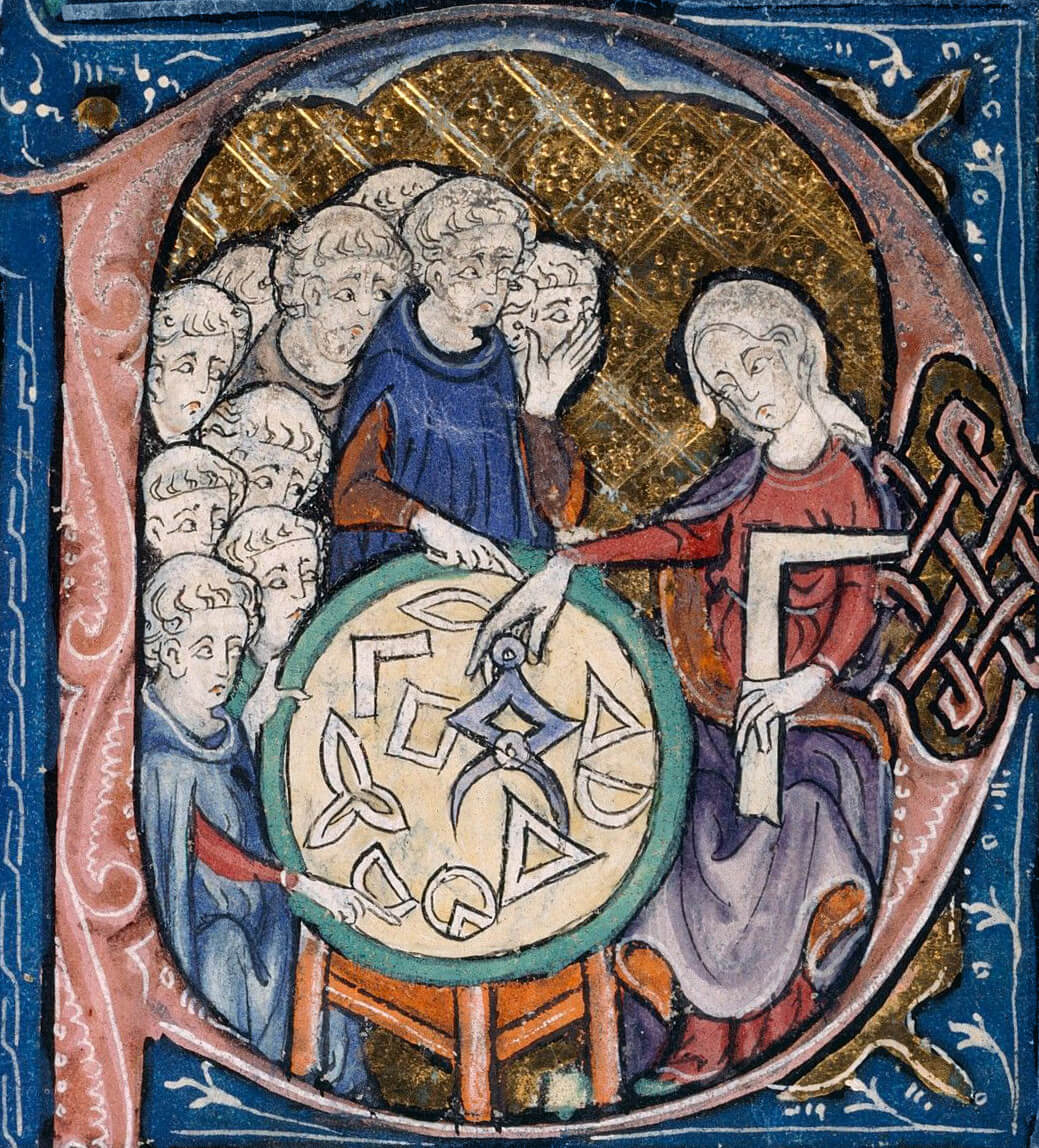
Woman teaching geometry (detail of a 14th-century illuminated manuscript, at the beginning of Euclid's Elementa, in the translation attributed to Adelard of Bath)

Pedagogy (/ˈpɛdəɡɒdʒi, -ɡoʊdʒi, -ɡɒɡi/), most commonly understood as the approach to teaching, is the theory and practice of learning, and how this process influences, and is influenced by, the social, political, and psychological development of learners. Pedagogy, taken as an academic discipline, is the study of how knowledge and skills are imparted in an educational context, and it considers the interactions that take place during learning. Both the theory and practice of pedagogy vary greatly as they reflect different social, political, and cultural contexts.

Pedagogy is often described as the act of teaching. The pedagogy adopted by teachers shapes their actions, judgments, and teaching strategies by taking into consideration theories of learning, understandings of students and their needs, and the backgrounds and interests of individual students. Its aims may range from furthering liberal education (the general development of human potential) to the narrower specifics of vocational education (the imparting and acquisition of specific skills).

Instructive strategies are governed by the pupil's background knowledge and experience, situation and environment, as well as learning goals set by the student and teacher. One example would be the Socratic method.

== Definition ==
The meaning of the term "pedagogy" is often contested and a great variety of definitions has been suggested. The most common approach is to define it as the study or science of teaching methods. In this sense, it is the methodology of education. As a methodology, it investigates the ways and practices that can be used to realize the aims of education. The main aim is often identified with the transmission of knowledge. Other aims include fostering skills and character traits. They include helping the student develop their intellectual and social abilities as well as psychomotor and affective learning, which are about developing practical skills and adequate emotional dispositions, respectively.

However, not everyone agrees with this characterization of pedagogy and some see it less as a science and more as an art or a craft. This characterization puts more emphasis on the practical aspect of pedagogy, which may involve various forms of "tacit knowledge that is hard to put into words". This approach is often based on the idea that the most central aspects of teaching are only acquired by practice and cannot be easily codified through scientific inquiry. In this regard, pedagogy is concerned with "observing and refining one's skill as a teacher". A more inclusive definition combines these two characterizations and sees pedagogy both as the practice of teaching and the discourse and study of teaching methods. Some theorists give an even wider definition by including considerations such as "the development of health and bodily fitness, social and moral welfare, ethics and aesthetics". Due to this variety of meanings, it is sometimes suggested that pedagogy is a "catch-all term" associated with various issues of teaching and learning. In this sense, it lacks a precise definition.

According to Patricia Murphy, a detailed reflection on the meaning of the term "pedagogy" is important nonetheless since different theorists often use it in very different ways. In some cases, non-trivial assumptions about the nature of learning are even included in its definition. Pedagogy is often specifically understood in relation to school education. But in a wider sense, it includes all forms of education, both inside and outside schools. In this wide sense, it is concerned with the process of teaching taking place between two parties: teachers and learners. The teacher's goal is to bring about certain experiences in the learner to foster their understanding of the subject matter to be taught. Pedagogy is interested in the forms and methods used to convey this understanding.

Pedagogy is closely related to didactics but there are some differences. Usually, didactics is seen as the more limited term that refers mainly to the teacher's role and activities, i.e how their behavior is most beneficial to the process of education. This is one central aspect of pedagogy besides other aspects that consider the learner's perspective as well. In this wider sense, pedagogy focuses on "any conscious activity by one person designed to enhance learning in another".

The word pedagogy is a derivative of the Greek παιδαγωγία (paidagōgia), from παιδαγωγός (paidagōgos), itself a synthesis of ἄγω (ágō), "I lead", and παῖς (país, genitive παιδός, paidos) "boy, child": hence, "attendance on boys, to lead a child". It is pronounced variously, as /ˈpɛdəɡɒdʒi/, /ˈpɛdəɡoʊdʒi/, or /ˈpɛdəɡɒɡi/. The related word pedagogue has had a negative connotation of pedantry, dating from at least the 1650s; a related expression is educational theorist. The term "pedagogy" is also found in the English discourse, but it is more broadly discussed in other European languages, such as French and German.

== History ==
=== Western ===
In the Western world, pedagogy is associated with the Greek tradition of philosophical dialogue, particularly the Socratic method of inquiry. A more general account of its development holds that it emerged from the active concept of humanity as distinct from a fatalistic one and that history and human destiny are results of human actions. This idea germinated in ancient Greece and was further developed during the Renaissance, the Reformation, and the Age of Enlightenment.

==== Socrates ====
Socrates (470 – 399 BCE) employed the Socratic method while engaging with a student or peer. This style does not impart knowledge, but rather tries to strengthen the logic of the student by revealing the conclusions of the statement of the student as erroneous or supported. The instructor in this learning environment recognizes the learners' need to think for themselves to facilitate their ability to think about problems and issues. It was first described by Plato in the Socratic Dialogues.

==== Plato ====
Plato (428/427 or 424/423 – 348/347 BCE) describes a system of education in The Republic (375 BCE) in which individual and family rights are sacrificed to the State. He describes three castes: one to learn a trade; one to learn literary and aesthetic ideas; and one to be trained in literary, aesthetic, scientific, and philosophical ideas. Plato saw education as a fulfillment of the soul, and by fulfilling the soul the body subsequently benefited. Plato viewed physical education for all as a necessity to a stable society.

==== Aristotle ====
Aristotle (384–322 BCE) composed a treatise, On Education, which was subsequently lost. However, he renounced Plato's view in subsequent works, advocating for a common education mandated to all citizens by the State. A small minority of people residing within Greek city-states at this time were considered citizens, and thus Aristotle still limited education to a minority within Greece. Aristotle advocates physical education should precede intellectual studies.

==== Quintilian ====
Marcus Fabius Quintilianus (35 – 100 CE) published his pedagogy in Institutio Oratoria (95 CE). He describes education as a gradual affair, and places certain responsibilities on the teacher. He advocates for rhetorical, grammatical, scientific, and philosophical education.

==== Tertullian ====
Quintus Septimius Florens Tertullianus (155 – 240 CE) was a Christian scholar who rejected all pagan education, insisting this was "a road to the false and arrogant wisdom of ancient philosophers".

==== Jerome ====
Saint Jerome (347 – 30 September 420 CE), or Saint Hieronymus, was a Christian scholar who detailed his pedagogy of girls in numerous letters throughout his life. He did not believe the body in need of training, and thus advocated for fasting and mortification to subdue the body. He only recommends the Bible as reading material, with limited exposure, and cautions against musical instruments. He advocates against letting girls interact with society, and of having "affections for one of her companions than for others." He does recommend teaching the alphabet by ivory blocks instead of memorization so "She will thus learn by playing." He is an advocate of positive reinforcement, stating "Do not chide her for the difficulty she may have in learning. On the contrary, encourage her by commendation..."

==== Jean Gerson ====
Jean Charlier de Gerson (13 December 1363 – 12 July 1429), the Chancellor of the University of Paris, wrote in De parvulis ad Christum trahendis "Little children are more easily managed by caresses than fear," supporting a more gentle approach than his Christian predecessors. He also states "Above all else, let the teacher make an effort to be a father to his pupils." He is considered a precursor of Fenelon.

==== John Amos Comenius ====
John Amos Comenius (28 March 1592 – 15 November 1670) is considered the father of modern education.

==== Johann Pestalozzi ====
Johann Heinrich Pestalozzi (January 12, 1746 – February 17, 1827), founder of several educational institutions both in German- and French-speaking regions of Switzerland and wrote many works explaining his revolutionary modern principles of education. His motto was "Learning by head, hand and heart".

==== Johann Herbart ====
The educational philosophy and pedagogy of Johann Friedrich Herbart (4 May 1776 – 14 August 1841) highlighted the correlation between personal development and the resulting benefits to society. In other words, Herbart proposed that humans become fulfilled once they establish themselves as productive citizens. Herbartianism refers to the movement underpinned by Herbart's theoretical perspectives. Referring to the teaching process, Herbart suggested five steps as crucial components. Specifically, these five steps include: preparation, presentation, association, generalization, and application. Herbart suggests that pedagogy relates to having assumptions as an educator and a specific set of abilities with a deliberate end goal in mind.

==== John Dewey ====
The pedagogy of John Dewey (20 October 1859 – 1 June 1952) is presented in several works, including My Pedagogic Creed (1897), The School and Society (1900), The Child and the Curriculum (1902), Democracy and Education (1916), Schools of To-morrow (1915) with Evelyn Dewey, and Experience and Education (1938). In his eyes, the purpose of education should not revolve around the acquisition of a pre-determined set of skills, but rather the realization of one's full potential and the ability to use those skills for the greater good (My Pedagogic Creed, Dewey, 1897). Dewey advocated for an educational structure that strikes a balance between delivering knowledge while also taking into account the interests and experiences of the student (The Child and the Curriculum, Dewey, 1902). Dewey not only re-imagined the way that the learning process should take place but also the role that the teacher should play within that process. He envisioned a divergence from the mastery of a pre-selected set of skills to the cultivation of autonomy and critical-thinking within the teacher and student alike.

==== Maria Montessori ====
The pedagogy of Maria Montessori (31 August 1870 – 6 May 1952) was initially a development from the work of Jean Marc Gaspard Itard, Édouard Séguin, Friedrich Fröbel, and Johann Heinrich Pestalozzi Her first significant written work Il Metodo della Pedagogia Scientifica applicato all'educazione infantile nelle Case dei Bambini was published in 1909 in her native Italian and subsequently in English, in London and New York in 1912, as The Montessori Method: Scientific Pedagogy as Applied to Child Education in the Children's Houses. Her pedagogy developed within the context of her experience in her first Casa dei Bambini which was established on the 6 January 1907 in the San Lorenzo district of Rome with a mixed age group of 50 children aged two to seven. Her pedagogy developed within the mixed age classroom and relied on the use of self-correcting didactic materials, allowing self chosen and self directed work for the children, within a carefully prepared environment which allowed freedom of movement and beneficial peer-to-peer engagement. Of necessity, Montessori became a prodigious designer of cultural artefacts and didactic apparatus and she was granted a number of patents in London and New York over the course of two decades, the first being for her sandpaper letters and numbers patented in 1914. Montessori continued to develop her pedagogy through her life to encompass the entirety of the span between birth and early adulthood. She was instrumental in the establishment of UNESCO Institute for Lifelong Learning and was nominated three times for the Nobel Peace Prize.

=== Eastern ===
==== Confucius ====
Confucius (551–479 BCE) stated that authority has the responsibility to provide oral and written instruction to the people under the rule, and "should do them good in every possible way." One of the deepest teachings of Confucius may have been the superiority of personal exemplification over explicit rules of behavior. His moral teachings emphasized self-cultivation, emulation of moral exemplars, and the attainment of skilled judgement rather than knowledge of rules. Other relevant practices in the Confucian teaching tradition include the Rite and its notion of body-knowledge as well as Confucian understanding of the self, one that has a broader conceptualization than the Western individual self.

== Pedagogical considerations ==
=== Teaching method ===
A teaching method is a set of principles and methods used by teachers to enable student learning. These strategies are determined partly by the subject matter to be taught, partly by the relative expertise of the learners, and partly by constraints caused by the learning environment. For a particular teaching method to be appropriate and efficient it has to take into account the learner, the nature of the subject matter, and the type of learning it is supposed to bring about.

=== Hidden curriculum ===
A hidden curriculum refers to extra educational activities or side effect of an education, "[lessons] which are learned but not openly intended" such as the transmission of norms, values, and beliefs conveyed in the classroom and the social environment.

=== Learning space ===
Learning space or learning setting refers to a physical setting for a learning environment, a place in which teaching and learning occur. The term is commonly used as a more definitive alternative to "classroom", but it may also refer to an indoor or outdoor location, either actual or virtual. Learning spaces are highly diverse in use, learning styles, configuration, location, and educational institution. They support a variety of pedagogies, including quiet study, passive or active learning, kinesthetic or physical learning, vocational learning, experiential learning, and others.

=== Learning theories ===
Learning theories are conceptual frameworks describing how knowledge is absorbed, processed, and retained during learning. Cognitive, emotional, and environmental influences, as well as prior experience, all play a part in how understanding, or a world view, is acquired or changed and knowledge and skills retained.

=== Distance learning ===
Distance education or long-distance learning is the education of students who may not always be physically present at a school. Traditionally, this usually involved correspondence courses wherein the student corresponded with the school via post. Today it involves online education. Courses that are conducted (51 percent or more) are either hybrid, blended or 100% distance learning. Massive open online courses (MOOCs), offering large-scale interactive participation and open access through the World Wide Web or other network technologies, are recent developments in distance education. A number of other terms (distributed learning, e-learning, online learning, etc.) are used roughly synonymously with distance education.

=== Teaching resource adaptation ===
Adapting the teaching resource should suit appropriate teaching and learning environments, national and local cultural norms, and make it accessible to different types of learners. Key adaptations in teaching resource include:

Classroom constraints

- Large class size – consider smaller groups or have discussions in pairs;
- Time available – shorten or lengthen the duration of activities;
- Modifying materials needed – find, make or substitute required materials;
- Space requirements – reorganize classroom, use a larger space, move indoors or outdoors.

Cultural familiarity

- Change references to names, food and items to make them more familiar;
- Substitute local texts or art (folklore, stories, songs, games, artwork and proverbs).

Local relevance

- Use the names and processes for local institutions such as courts;
- Be sensitive of local behavior norms (e.g. for genders and ages);
- Ensure content is sensitive to the degree of rule of law in society (trust in authorities and institutions).

Inclusivity for diverse students

- Appropriate reading level(s) of texts for student use;
- Activities for different learning styles;
- Accommodation for students with special educational needs;
- Sensitivity to cultural, ethnic and linguistic diversity;
- Sensitivity to students' socioeconomic status.

== Pedagogical approaches ==
=== Evidence-based ===
Evidence-based education (EBE) is the principle that education practices should be based on the best available scientific evidence, with randomised trials as the gold standard of evidence, rather than tradition, personal judgement, or other influences. Evidence-based education is related to evidence-based teaching, evidence-based learning, and school effectiveness research.

=== Dialogic learning ===
Dialogic learning is learning that takes place through dialogue. It is typically the result of egalitarian dialogue; in other words, the consequence of a dialogue in which different people provide arguments based on validity claims and not on power claims.

=== Student-centered learning ===
Student-centered learning, also known as learner-centered education, broadly encompasses methods of teaching that shift the focus of instruction from the teacher to the student. In original usage, student-centered learning aims to develop learner autonomy and independence by putting responsibility for the learning path in the hands of students. Student-centered instruction focuses on skills and practices that enable lifelong learning and independent problem-solving.

=== Critical pedagogy ===
Critical pedagogy applies critical theory to pedagogy and asserts that educational practices are contested and shaped by history, that schools are not politically neutral spaces, and that teaching is political. Decisions regarding the curriculum, disciplinary practices, student testing, textbook selection, the language used by the teacher, and more can empower or disempower students. It asserts that educational practices favor some students over others and some practices harm all students. It also asserts that educational practices often favor some voices and perspectives while marginalizing or ignoring others.

== Academic degrees ==
The academic degree Ped. D., Doctor of Pedagogy, is awarded honorarily by some US universities to distinguished teachers (in the US and UK, earned degrees within the instructive field are classified as an Ed.D., Doctor of Education, or a Ph.D., Doctor of Philosophy). The term is also used to denote an emphasis in education as a specialty in a field (for instance, a Doctor of Music degree in piano pedagogy).

== Pedagogues around the world ==
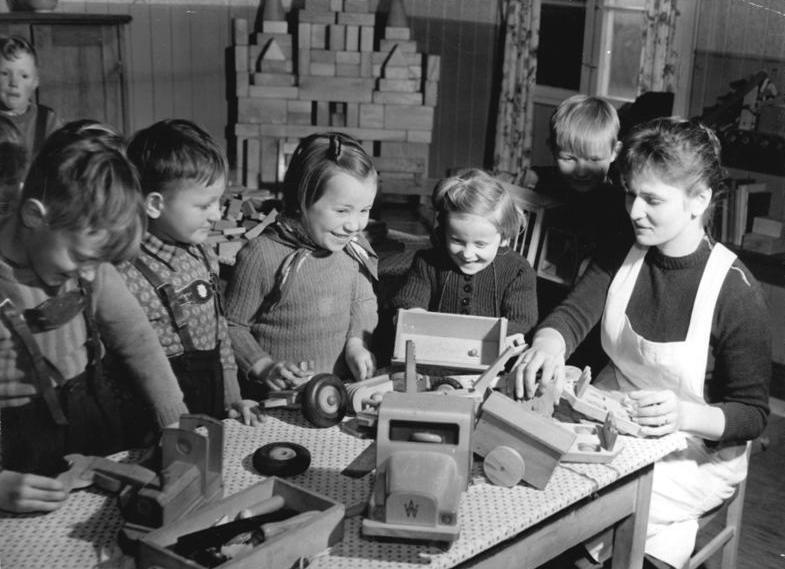
Germany: A kindergarten teacher facilitates play for a group of children (1960).

The education of pedagogues, and their role in society, varies greatly from culture to culture.

=== Belgium ===
Important pedagogues in Belgium are Jan Masschelein and Maarten Simons (Catholic University of Leuven). According to these scholars, schools nowadays are often dismissed as outdated or ineffective. Deschoolers even argue that schools rest on the false premise that schools are necessary for learning but that people learn faster or better outside the classroom. Others critique the fact that some teachers stand before a classroom with only six weeks of teacher education. Against this background, Masschelein and Simons propose to look at school from a different point of view. Their educational morphology approaches the school as a particular scholastic 'form of gathering'. What the authors mean with that, is the following: school is a particular time-space-matter arrangement. This thus includes concretes architectures, technologies, practices and figures. This arrangement "deals in a specific way with the new generation, allows for a particular relation to the world, and for a particular experience of potentiality and of commonality (of making things public)".

Masschelein and Simons' most famous work is the book "Looking after school: a critical analysis of personalisation in Education". It takes a critical look at the main discourse of today's education. Education is seen through a socio-economic lens: education is aimed at mobilising talents and competencies (p23). This is seen in multiple texts from governing bodies, in Belgium and Europe. One of the most significant examples is quoted on page 23:

Education and training can only contribute to growth and job-creation if learning is focused on the knowledge, skills and competences to be acquired by students (learning outcomes) through the learning process, rather than on completing a specific stage or on time spent in school. (European Commission, 2012, p.7)

This is, according to Masschelein and Simons a plea for learning outcomes and demonstrates a vision of education in which the institution is no longer the point of departure. The main ambition in this discourse of education is the efficient and effective realisation of learning outcomes for all. Things like the place and time of learning, didactic and pedagogic support are means to an end: the acquisition of preplanned learning outcomes. And these outcomes are a direct input for the knowledge economy. Masschelein and Simons' main critique here is that the main concern is not the educational institution (anymore). Rather, the focus lies on the learning processes and mainly on the learning outcomes of the individual learner.

=== Brazil ===
In Brazil, a pedagogue is a multidisciplinary educator. Undergraduate education in Pedagogy qualifies students to become school administrators or coordinators at all educational levels, and also to become multidisciplinary teachers, such as pre-school, elementary, and special teachers.

=== Hungary ===
In Hungary, the word pedagogue (pedagógus) is synonymous with the teacher (tanár); therefore, teachers of both primary and secondary schools may be referred to as pedagogues, a word that appears also in the name of their lobbyist organizations and labor unions (e.g. Labor Union of Pedagogues, Democratic Labor Union of Pedagogues). However, undergraduate education in Pedagogy does not qualify students to become teachers in primary or secondary schools but makes them able to apply to be educational assistants. As of 2013, the six-year training period was re-installed in place of the undergraduate and postgraduate division which characterized the previous practice.

=== Nordic countries ===
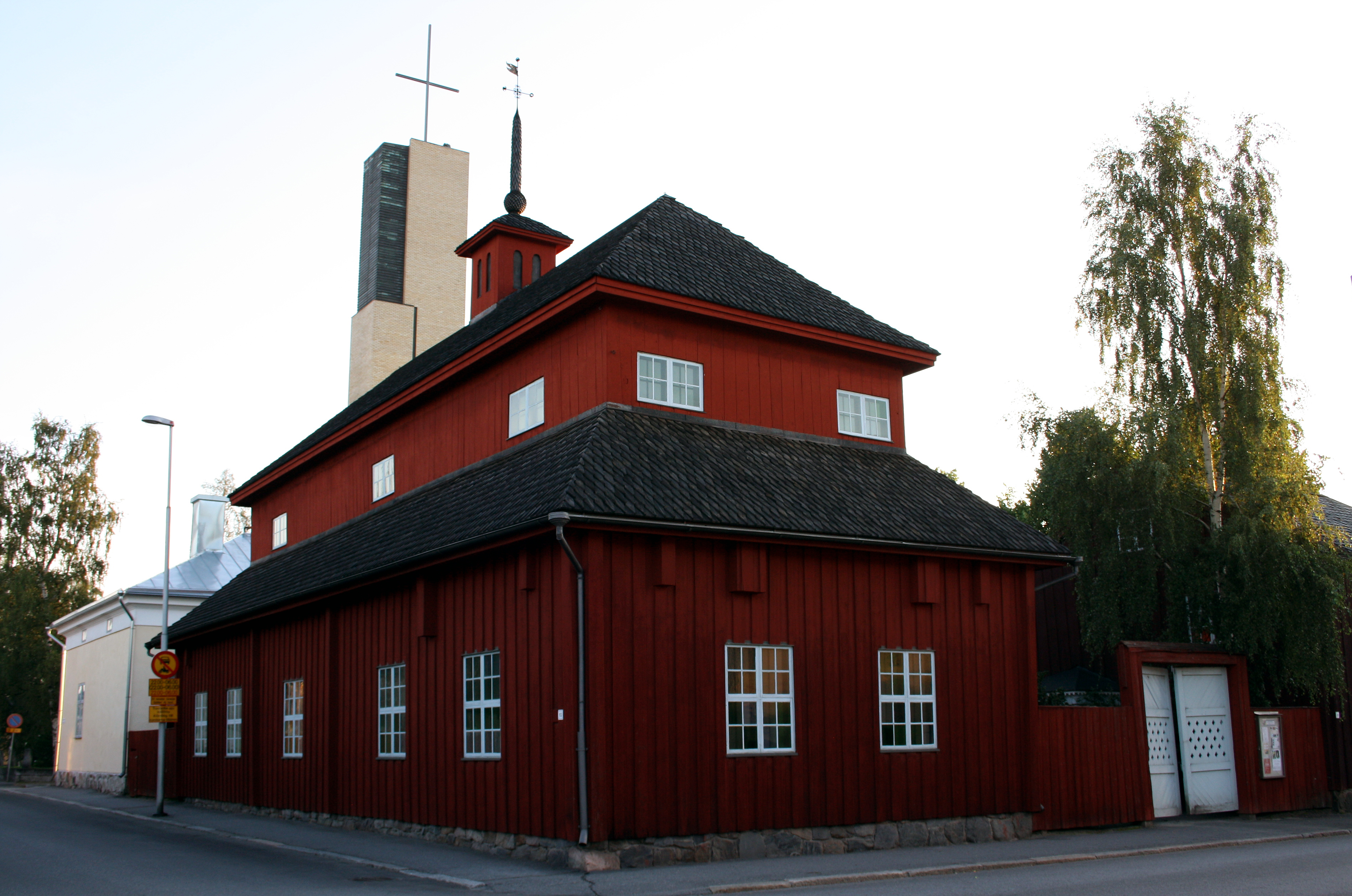
An old paedagogium from 1696 in Kokkola, Finland

In Scandinavia, a pedagogue (pædagog) is broadly speaking a practitioner of pedagogy, but the term is primarily reserved for individuals who occupy jobs in pre-school education (such as kindergartens, nurseries) and after-school activities (Danish: Skolefritidsordning). A pedagogue can occupy various kinds of jobs, within this restrictive definition, e.g. in retirement homes, prisons, orphanages, and human resource management. When working with at-risk families or youths they are referred to as social pedagogues (socialpædagog).

The pedagogue's job is usually distinguished from a teacher's by primarily focusing on teaching children life-preparing knowledge such as social or non-curriculum skills, and cultural norms. There is also a very big focus on the care and well-being of the child. Many pedagogical institutions also practice social inclusion. The pedagogue's work also consists of supporting the child in their mental and social development.

In Denmark, all pedagogues are educated at a series of national institutes for social educators located in all major cities. The education is a 3.5-year academic course, giving the student the title of a Bachelor in Social Education (Danish: Professionsbachelor som pædagog). It is also possible to earn a master's degree in pedagogy/educational sciences from various universities. This BA and MA program has a more theoretical focus compared to the more vocational Bachelor in Social Education.

In Finland, pedagogy is studied in university departments of education and through vocational teacher training programs at universities of applied sciences. In the work Hermeneuttisen pedagogiikan pääsuuntaukset ("Main Currents of Hermeneutic Pedagogy"), Emeritus Professor Pauli Siljander from the University of Oulu characterizes the distinction between the concepts of "pedagogy" and "educational science" by noting that pedagogy is generally used as a broader term, encompassing both the theoretical aspects of education and educational practice. In 21st-century Finland, macro-level pedagogy has become instrumentalized—critics refer to this as "thin pedagogy"—and seeks to derive specific societal benefits from education.

== Modern pedagogy ==
An article from The Kathmandu Post published on 3 June 2018 described the usual first day of school in an academic calendar. Teachers meet their students with distinct traits. The diversity of attributions among children or teens exceeds similarities. Educators have to teach students with different cultural, social, and religious backgrounds. This situation entails a differentiated strategy in pedagogy and not the traditional approach for teachers to accomplish goals efficiently.

American author and educator Carol Ann Tomlinson defined Differentiated Instruction as "teachers' efforts in responding to inconsistencies among students in the classroom." Differentiation refers to methods of teaching. She explained that Differentiated Instruction gives learners a variety of alternatives for acquiring information. Primary principles comprising the structure of Differentiated Instruction include formative and ongoing assessment, group collaboration, recognition of students' diverse levels of knowledge, problem-solving, and choice in reading and writing experiences.

Howard Gardner gained prominence in the education sector for his Multiple Intelligences Theory. He named seven of these intelligences in 1983: Linguistic, Logical and Mathematical, Visual and Spatial, Body and Kinesthetic, Musical and Rhythmic, Intrapersonal, and Interpersonal. Critics say the theory is based only on Gardner's intuition instead of empirical data. Another criticism is that the intelligence is too identical for types of personalities. The theory of Howard Gardner came from cognitive research and states these intelligences help people to "know the world, understand themselves, and other people." Said differences dispute an educational system that presumes students can "understand the same materials in the same manner and that a standardized, collective measure is very much impartial towards linguistic approaches in instruction and assessment as well as to some extent logical and quantitative styles."

=== Educational research ===
Educational research refers to the systematic collection and analysis of evidence and data related to the field of education. Research may involve a variety of methods and aspects of education including student learning, interaction, teaching methods, teacher training, and classroom dynamics.

== See also ==
- Education – Transmission of knowledge and skills
- Adult education – Any form of learning adults engage in beyond traditional schooling
- Education sciences – Study of education policy and practice
- Bloom's taxonomy – Classification system in education
- Didactic method – Teaching method
- Geragogy – Science of education of older adults
- Gender mainstreaming in teacher education policy
- Philosophy of education – Study of nature and aims of education
- Antipedagogy – Critical theory of education
- Outline of education
- Scholarship of teaching and learning – Study of post-secondary teaching

== Sources ==
- This article incorporates text from a free content work. Licensed under CC BY-SA 3.0 IGO. Text taken from Empowering students for just societies: a handbook for secondary school teachers, UNESCO, UNESCO. UNESCO.
