= Pre-assessment =

Type of educational assessment

A pre-assessment, or pre-test, is a piece of assessment conducted before a period of instruction or training, particularly to establish existing knowledge and skills in a particular area.

A pre-assessment may be used by instructors or teachers to gauge a student's ability in a particular area, particularly for differentiated instruction.

== Differentiated instruction ==
Some teachers assume best practices in their classroom, include such things as students sitting on the floor, listening to music, drawing, being loud or being quiet but doing so as a class. Because these students are doing these things as a class it is not differentiated Instruction. Amy Benjamin writes differentiated instruction is a "variety of classroom practices that allow for differences in students' learning styles, interests, prior knowledge, socialization needs and comfort zones". To learn students individual needs we as teachers need to assess those students and pre-assessment can to be done at the beginning of the school year and to identify students learning modalities, interests and readiness for content.

=== Modalities ===
There are two types of modality theories; one is learning styles theory, the other is multiple intelligence. Learning style theory suggests that learning styles differ from student to student. A few examples of learning styles are active learners, verbal learners, and reflective learners. Learning styles theory is highly criticized and lacks empirical evidence to support it. Another type of modality is multiple intelligence, which was created by Howard Gardner. He takes a physiological approach to multiple intelligence by breaking it into eight categories. These categories help teachers understand the different types of diverse learning abilities. First is logical/mathematical which means the student learns better with logic, reasoning and numbers. Verbal/ Linguistic is another way that the students' strengths are with words and language. Another type is visual/spatial in which a student would rather use graphs, charts and drawings. Students who enjoy sound, rhymes, and music are musical/rhythmical learners. Bodily/kinesthetic learners are better with their hands and have better control over their bodily motions. Another type is Naturalist/Environmental, these students are sensitive, nurturing and like to use all five sense. The seventh is interpersonal, a type of student who communicates well and can be an extrovert. Last, students who can self-reflect and are introverts they are intrapersonal learners. Multiple intelligence is a great way to separate students out and learn their best learning modality.

=== Interests ===
During pre-assessment, teachers have to learn about students' interests and readiness for the content in order to help motivate the students. However, students have to be the ones who motivate themselves. We as teachers have to grab their attention by utilizing what we know about their interests. Once we know the students interests we can integrate it into the lesson plans. Lynda Rice uses the example that if a student has trouble writing complete sentences use his interests to help him become motivated. A way to do that is by incorporating the students favorite things, which in this case was a superhero. The student was told to write conversation bubbles between other superheroes or even the villains. This helped him become motivated to write complete sentences.

=== Readiness for content ===
The purpose of pre-assessment of readiness is to find out what the students know and don't know to help plan your lessons to your specific students each year. Every year teacher's students are different. You may not be able to teach the same units the same way because of the classes readiness. At the beginning of the year and before new units it would be best to do a pre-assessment of the students to see what they know. The teachers should also give parents an evaluation in the beginning of the year because they know their child best. Planning and preparing for a class day is difficult, having these pre-assessments done will help you spend more time teaching students what they don't know and just refreshing them on what they do already do know. For example, if you are going to be starting a new unit in math, how to add and subtract. Just by asking the students "What does addition mean?", "What does subtraction mean" and, "Do they relate to each other?", the teacher would be able to know that the students had a good basic knowledge of the information and could start on application-based activities. Doing pre-assessment before each unit could help teachers using their time teaching students new information and save time by not teaching them what they may already know with remediation. There are many examples of ways to determine the classes understanding of different subjects. They can be used with formative and summative assessments not just pre-assessment. Once the teacher has decided on the next unit of study they can have the students trace their hands on a piece of paper. On one hand they can write 5 things they already know about the subjects and on the other hand they can write what they wish to know about the subject. This can be done with partners or individually. Teachers can use this to plan the unit and could also use it as another activity by having the students research and answer their own questions. Teachers can also create a worksheet or use note cards to have the students do as homework to get into the classroom the next day. Just asking them "What do you know about the topic?", "Is this topic interesting to you?". Another way is to give the class a test and go over the answers with them, allowing them to correct their own test and find prior knowledge. Using end-of-unit tests can be a great thing for the students; it helps them recognize the important parts of the upcoming unit. There are many ways to find out what students know about subjects that will help you better prepare and spend time wisely within the classroom.

== Evaluating ==
Pre-assessment should always be evaluated but never with grades (Rice, 2013). Teachers should use checkmarks, symbols and highlighter to help find where the students need the most instruction. These assessments should be used to create teachers lesson plans and help the teacher find the best approach for the new unit. The best way to assess is to use graphic organizers, which will be described greater detail below. Evaluation is an ongoing process throughout the school year. As the students learn and grow so will their knowledge and abilities. There was a study done about India curriculum and that evaluated the effectiveness of pre- and post- assessment. Overall the findings showed that pre- and post assessment had a positive effect on the students learning. The student had increased their average score 11% from the pre-assessment to post. In pre-assessment they were given a subjective method of asking what they already know or do not know about the subject. They also were given an assessment that was an objective method that asked yes/no questions. For example, was the information was easy to understand, useful, and well organized.

== Organizing data ==
Graphic organizers are a way to organize the data from pre-assessment. Making a prescription for differentiation sheet is one way to do so. It incorporates all the data into four categories, such as learning styles, multiple intelligences, interests and readiness for content. Each student would have here own sheet filled out and can be used for planning lessons throughout the year. These are options for students who are bored, or unmotivated. These sheets can also be used for creating groups for the class and finding students that may work well together. Teachers must also organize their classroom management and delivery strategies to effectively operate a classroom with differentiated instruction.

== Learning cycle ==
Pre-assessments are most often given at the beginning of the year and sometimes are exact copies of the intended final exam. This allows students to know what will be on the final and an understanding of what topics need the most attention. Some pre-assessments add an "I do not know" or "uncertain" option to questions to avoid false-positives on the evaluation. After the pre-assessment is complete teachers can adjust their lesson plan in accordance with the results. Pre-assessment may be used to create groups for projects or activities based on the students needs. At the end of the year the final often reflects or copies the pre-assessment, accurately showing student improvement.

== See also ==
- Differentiated instruction
