= Effective schools =

"Effective Schools" is both an educational movement and body of research which examines school-based factors which positively influence learning outcomes in K-12 schools. Effective schools research has been widely adopted by school districts worldwide.

== History ==
Early research into the essential qualities of successful schools emerged in North America as a response to the controversial 1966 Coleman Report, which concluded that family background and socio-economics were the major determinants of student achievement. Research published by Christopher Jencks in 1972 contributed to Coleman's findings, suggesting that "school quality has little effect on achievement."

The Coleman Report prompted U.S. policymakers to focus on "compensatory programs" which focused on changing the behavior of less advantaged students. The report also stimulated vigorous reaction from educational researchers who believed, to the contrary, that schools could make a significant difference on student achievement. Their research formed the foundation of the 'Effective Schools Movement', and enabled them to assert that "all children can learn and that the school controls the factors necessary to assure student mastery of the core curriculum."

Early effective schools researchers attempted to locate schools that were successful in educating students of all backgrounds, regardless of socio-economic status or family background. Such schools were found in varying locations and communities, and researchers tried to isolate which philosophies, policies, and practices those schools had in common.

Larry Lezotte and Wilbur B. Brookover conducted studies at eight Michigan elementary schools in the mid-1970s, identifying characteristics of schools that were improving or declining. A notable finding was that "staff in the declining schools had low opinions of their students' abilities, while the staff in the improving schools had high opinions of student abilities".

George Weber, and later Ronald Edmonds, conducted research in inner-city U.S. schools where students of low socio-economic background were able to equal or surpass the national average. Edmonds' 1979 article "Effective Schools for the Urban Poor" is noted for drawing professional attention to the effective schools movement. Edmonds outlined six characteristics essential to effective schools, including:

1. Strong administrative leadership.
2. High expectations.
3. An orderly atmosphere.
4. Basic skills acquisition as the school’s primary purpose.
5. Capacity to divert school energy and resources from other activities to advance the school’s basic purpose.
6. Frequent monitoring of pupil progress.

Educational researchers soon dropped "capacity to divert energy and resources" from the list, and Edmonds' “five-factor model” was widely proclaimed as a framework for reforming low-performing schools.

In 1979, Fifteen Thousand Hours documented effective schools research in high schools in the United Kingdom, and found that school characteristics could positively alter student achievement.

Edmonds published "Programs of School Improvement: An Overview" in 1982, describing the "correlates of effective schools", a now widely used phrase commonly associated with the later work of Lezotte. Edmonds' correlates described effective schools as the following:

1. The leadership of the principal notable for substantial attention to the quality of instruction.
2. A pervasive and broadly understood instructional focus.
3. An orderly, safe climate conducive to teaching and learning.
4. Teacher behaviors that convey the expectation that all students are expected to obtain at least minimum mastery.
5. The use of measures of pupil achievement as the basis for program evaluation.

In 1991, Lezotte published Correlates of Effective Schools: The First and Second Generation, describing the "Seven Correlates of Effective Schools":

1. Instructional leadership.
2. Clear and focused mission.
3. Safe and orderly environment.
4. Climate of high expectations.
5. Frequent monitoring of student progress.
6. Positive home-school relations.
7. Opportunity to learn and student time on task.

The correlates of effective schools have remained a cornerstone for many school districts.

== Current use ==
The Council of Ontario Directors of Education describes Lezotte's seven correlates as "being necessary for ensuring high levels of student achievement", adding that educators should also consider the importance of home and an empathic community.

The District of Columbia Public Schools has broadened its description of effective schools to include:

1. Teaching and Learning.
2. Leadership.
3. Job-Embedded Professional Development.
4. Resources.
5. Safe and Effective Learning Environment.
6. Family and Community Engagement.
7. Data-Driven Decision Making.

== Implementation ==
A key finding regarding the implementation of effective schools reforms is that the positive support the school principal is fundamental to success. Also, teacher support for, belief in, and commitment to a particular reform tended to follow months or years of successful practice.
