= Ronald Edmonds =

American educator, author and pioneer of effective schools research

- Born: May 24, 1935; Ypsilanti, Michigan
- Died: July 15, 1983; Lansing, Michigan
- Education: University of Michigan
- Known for: Educational research

Ronald R. Edmonds (May 24, 1935 – July 15, 1983) was an American educator, author, and pioneer of effective schools research.

== Early life and career ==
Edmonds was born in Ypsilanti, Michigan. He received a B.A. in American history from the University of Michigan, an M.A. in American history from Eastern Michigan University, and a certificate of advanced study from Harvard Graduate School of Education.

Edmonds began his career as a teacher at Pioneer High School in Ann Arbor, Michigan, in 1964. He was a faculty member at the University of Michigan's Labor School from 1968 to 1970, and Director of the Center for Urban Studies in Harvard's graduate education program from 1973 to 1977. From 1981 until his death in 1983, Edmonds was a professor in the Department of Teacher Education at Michigan State University.

Edmonds served as assistant superintendent with the Michigan Department of Public Instruction from 1970 to 1972, and senior assistant for instruction with New York City Public Schools from 1977 to 1980.

== Effective schools research ==
Edmonds' research into the essential qualities of successful schools emerged as a response to the controversial 1966 Coleman Report, which concluded that family background and socio-economics were the major determinants of student achievement. Research published by Christopher Jenks in 1972 contributed to Coleman's findings, suggesting that "school quality has little effect on achievement."

While Edmonds acknowledged that socio-economic background makes a difference, he contended that professional educators were absolved from their duty to be instructionally effective if they believed family background determined academic achievement. Edmonds and other researchers did not accept the Coleman Report's findings as conclusive, and attempted to locate schools where children from low income families were successful. Doing so would demonstrate that schools can and do make a difference. Edmonds examined the achievement data from elementary schools in several major U.S. cities where students were from poor backgrounds, and was able to identify schools where these children were highly successful. By comparing these schools with other successful or unsuccessful schools, Edmonds was able to identify characteristics which seemed essential to student success.

In 1979, Edmonds published "Effective Schools for the Urban Poor", outlining the following characteristics of effective schools:

1. Strong administrative leadership.
2. High expectations.
3. An orderly atmosphere.
4. Basic skills acquisition as the school's primary purpose.
5. Capacity to divert school energy and resources from other activities to advance the school's basic purpose.
6. Frequent monitoring of pupil progress.

Educational researchers soon dropped "capacity to divert energy and resources" from the list, and Edmonds' "five-factor model" was widely proclaimed as a framework for reforming low-performing schools.

Edmonds stated that "mastery of basic skills" was fundamental to effective schools, and also "by equity I mean a simple sense of fairness in the distribution of the primary goods and services that characterize our social order." Also, "equitable public schooling begins by teaching poor children what their parents want them to know and ends by teaching poor children at least as well as it teaches middle class children."

New York City Schools Chancellor Frank Macchiarola stated that his schools had undertaken reforms based on Edmonds' "seemingly obvious but actually revolutionary concept that all children can learn."

== Publications ==
=== Books ===
- A Black Response to Christopher Jencks's Inequality and Certain Other Issues (1973).
- Black Colleges in America: Challenge, Development, Survival (1978).
- A discussion of the Literature and Issues Related to Effective Schooling (1979).
- An Overview of School Improvement Programs (1983).

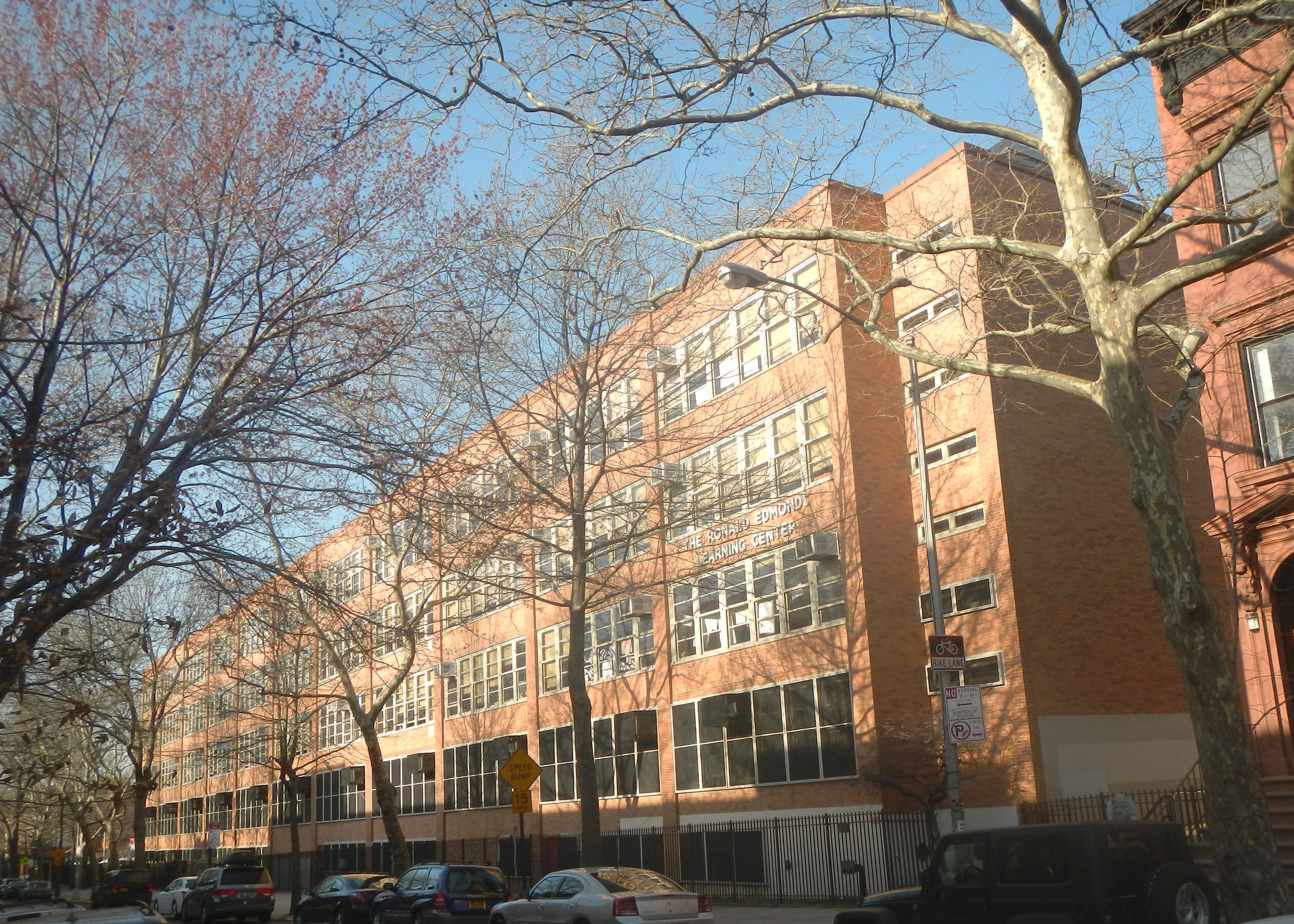
Ronald Edmonds Learning Center

== Honors ==
The Ronald Edmonds Learning Center and playground in Brooklyn are named in his honor.
