= Instructional leadership =

Educational position

Instructional leadership is generally defined as the management of curriculum and instruction by a school principal. This term appeared as a result of research associated with the effective school movement of the 1980s, which revealed that the key to running successful schools lies in the principals' role. However, the concept of instructional leadership is recently stretched out to include more distributed models which emphasize distributed and shared empowerment among school staff, for example distributed leadership, shared leadership, and transformational leadership.

== History ==
The concept of instructional leadership emerged and developed in the United States within the effective school movement of the 1980s. The research resulting from this movement revealed that a principal is critical to success in children's learning within poor urban elementary schools. This research revealed that the personality characteristics of the ideal principal are strong mindedness, directness, top-down management and charisma.

During the 1990s, a strong instructional leadership model was still at the center of the educational leadership discussion, because of its effectiveness in the schools. However, since then this concept has been criticized for focusing too much on the individual principal's heroic role. As a result, the scholars started to explore leadership models to supplement these critics and point out the distributed nature of instructional leadership such as transformational leadership, teacher leadership, shared leadership, and distributed leadership, all of which understand educational leadership as broader perspectives practice that includes school communities. Moreover, the accountability movement of the 21st century sheds new light on instructional leadership since this paradigm puts more emphasis on the learning outcomes for students.

== Approaches ==
Researchers have further defined instructional leadership to include different approaches. First, the concept of instructional leadership could be divided into an "exclusive" and an ‘inclusive’ approach. Researchers who count instructional leadership as "exclusive" regard the principal as the sole holder of responsibility when it comes to setting goals for the school, supervision, and in developing instruction that enhances academic achievement. This perspective tends to focus only on the role of principals as instructional leaders (e.g. Hallinger & Murphy, 1985).

However, other researchers have recently expanded the concept of instructional leadership to include not only principals, but also other school staff. They take an "inclusive" approach to instructional leadership. Especially, Marks and Printy (2003) have pointed out the importance of the collaboration between principals and teachers to develop curriculum and instruction for improving pupils' performance. Thus, they conceptualized this inclusive approach as “shared instructional leadership” and understood the role of principals as that of “leaders of instructional leaders”. Hallinger (2003) has argued the transformational leadership approach, in which leadership is shared with school staff; this approach is said to empower staff. Transformational leadership is a good supplement to the instructional leadership approach that focuses solely on principals and top-down strategies. For this reason, Hallinger has proposed the integration of instructional and transformational leadership approaches.

Second, researchers have classified modes of instructional leadership according to "direct" and "indirect" activities. The former is considered a "narrow" mode and the latter a"broad" mode of instructional leadership. This distinction is due to the fact that a direct perspective focuses only on immediate actions related to instruction, such as classroom observation and curriculum development, whereas an indirect perspective broadly focuses on indirect activities, such as creating the school climate, as well as direct activities.

== Characteristics ==
Several researchers have outlined the characteristics and components of instructional leadership. Hallinger and Murphy's (1985) conceptual model has been most widely used in empirical studies of instructional leadership. The authors proposed the key role of instructional leaders in three dimensions: 1) Defining the school mission, 2) Managing the instructional program, and 3) Promoting a positive school-learning climate. In these three dimensions, principals have different functions. First, their analyses of a leader's role in defining the school mission focuses on two functions: framing clear school goals and communicating clear school goals. Second, in the area of managing the instructional program, principals have three functions: supervising and evaluating instruction, coordinating curriculum, and monitoring student progress. Third, in regards topromoting a positive school-learning climate principals have five functions: protecting instructional time, promoting professional development, maintaining high visibility, providing incentives for teachers, and providing incentives for learning.

Murphy (1990) proposed four major dimensions of instructional leadership: 1) Developing mission and goals, 2) Managing the education production function, 3) Promoting an academic learning climate, and 4) Developing a supportive work environment.

Duke(1982) suggested six functions of instructional leadership related to teacher and school effectiveness: 1) Staff development: recruitment, in-service education, and staff motivation, 2) Instructional support: organized activities to maintain an environmentgeared towards improving teaching and learning, 3) Resource acquisition and allocation: adequate learning materials, appropriate facilities, and skilled support personnel 4) Quality control: evaluation, supervision, rewards, and sanctions, 5) Coordination: activities that prevent cross-purposes or duplicate operations, and 6) Troubleshooting: anticipation and resolution of problems in school operation. The first four functions of instructional leadership are directly related to instruction behaviors, whereas the remaining functions are indirectly relevant to instructional activities.

Andrew, Bascom, and Bascom (1991) defined four strategies that instructional leaders use to enhance student achievement: 1) Resource provider: provision of resources to attain learning goals, 2) Instructional resource: provision of strategies and skills to achieve better teaching practice, opportunities for professional development, and assessment for school performance related to instruction, 3) Communicator: promoting discussion among school members about school vision, goals, and culture for successful learning, and 4) Visible presence: showing up through face-to-face interaction as well as through informal exchanges in day-to-day activities.

Through extensive literature review, Spillane, Halverson, and Diamond (2004) identified that instructional leaders have several macro-school-level functions. "1) constructing and selling an instructional vision, 2) developing and managing a school culture conducive to conversations about the core technology of instruction by building norms of trust, collaboration, and academic press among staff, 3) procuring and distributing resources, including materials, time, support, and compensation, 4) supporting teacher growth and development, both individually and collectively, 5) providing both summative and formative monitoring of instruction and innovation, and 6) establishing a school climate in which disciplinary issues do not dominate instructional issues."

== Empirical study ==
A study by Hallinger and Heck (1996, 1998) reviewed extensive empirical research conducted between 1980 and 1995 about the effects of principals on student achievement and identified three models to describe these (1996, p. 16; 1998, p. 162).

-A direct-effects model, where principals directly affect student outcomes without mediating variables.

-A mediated-effects model, where principals indirectly affect student outcomes through mediating variables (e.g. features of school organization, teachers, and staff)

-reciprocal-effects model, where principals and features of the school have an interactive relationship

A direct-effect model

With regard to the direct effect of principals on student outcomes, the result showed that the effects were "nonexistent, weak, conflicting or suspect in terms of validity" (1996, p. 37). It indicates that principals do not directly affect student achievement or, if they do, the effects are quite small. Also, critics point out that this approach does not reveal through what hidden process school leaders impact on student performance.

A mediated-effects model

In comparison to this findings above, the mediated-effect model was based on more "sophisticated theoretical, strong research design, and powerful statistical methods" (1996, p. 37). It found that principals significantly impact students' performance through other mediating variables, such as other school staff, events or organizational factors.

Reciprocal-effects model

In defining the reciprocal-effect model, the authors pointed out that there were no studies to demonstrate this effect yet. In this model, principals not only carry out their leadership role in ways that influence academic achievement, but school outcomes inversely affect principals’ activities as well. Thus, principals and school performance have a reciprocal relationship.

Other studies

Besides Hallingers and Heck's broad review, several studies conducted in the 1990s and 2000s have also explored the effect of instructional leadership on teacher and student outcome. With respect to the effect of principals on teachers, Shepperd(1996) study in Canadian schools revealed that principals’ instructional leadership activities are positively related to the level of teacher commitment to the school, professional involvement, and innovativeness in the school.

== Stages in developing instructional leaders ==
Marsh (1992) argued that instructional leaders develop in three stages; 1) Getting started, 2) Doing the pieces of instructional leadership, and 3) Understanding the whole of instructional leadership. In the first stage, principals get to socialize themselves into the role of site administrator and develop routine management skills. However, they do not have real focus on instructional leadership yet. In the second stage, principals could improve their capacity for management. At this stage, principals reflect management and instructional leaderships as an isolated notion, and they still have a fragmented understanding about instructional leadership. In the third stage, principals fully understand the relation between management and instructional leadership. At this stage, they can integrate management and instructional leadership, activities and functions. Finally, they comprehend and reflect instructional leadership as an integrated view.

== Limitation ==
With the extensive review of empirical studies, Hallinger (2003) pointed out limitations of the concept of instructional leadership and the attentive point of empirical studies. First, the narrowed role of principals, which is confined to developing instructional activities for student performance, does not allow us to fully understand the nature of principals since a principal has various roles when managing a school.

Second, strategies of instructional leadership are influenced by the context of schools such as school size, language background, community, and a school's socio-economic status. That is, the effective activities of instructional leaders, which affect student achievement and school performance, should be considered in the context of school and community environment. In this sense, the effort to measure the effects of instructional leadership without consideration of the school context might be avoided in empirical research.
