= Larry Lezotte =

Lawrence W. "Larry" Lezotte is an American educational researcher, consultant, and speaker, notable for his expertise on creating effective K-12 schools.

== Education and career ==
Lezotte earned his bachelor's and master's degrees at Western Michigan University, and his doctorate at Michigan State University (MSU) in 1969. He joined the MSU faculty and taught there for 18 years.

Lezotte went on to found Effective Schools Products, a consulting and publishing firm in Okemos, Michigan. He has written widely on effective schools, and speaks across North America.

== Research ==
Lezotte's early research was in response to the controversial 1966 Coleman Report, which concluded that family background was the major determinant of student achievement.

Between 1974 and 1976, Lezotte and Wilbur B. Brookover conducted studies at eight Michigan elementary schools, identifying characteristics of schools that were improving or declining. A notable finding was that "staff in the declining schools had low opinions of their students' abilities, while the staff in the improving schools had high opinions of student abilities".

Other effective schools researchers were also able to identify schools where children mastered the curriculum, regardless of family background, race or socio-economics.

In 1991, Lezotte published Correlates of Effective Schools: The First and Second Generation, describing the "7 Correlates of Effective Schools" as:

1. Instructional leadership.
2. Clear and focused mission.
3. Safe and orderly environment.
4. Climate of high expectations.
5. Frequent monitoring of student progress.
6. Positive home-school relations.
7. Opportunity to learn and student time on task.

== Publications ==
=== Books ===
- A Guide to the School Improvement Process Bases on Effective Schools Research (1990)
- Sustainable School Reform: The District Context (1992)
- Creating The Total Quality Effective School (1992)
- Learning for All (1997)
- Dear Colleague (1998)
- The Effective School A Proven Path to Learning for All (1999)
- Safe And Orderly Environment (1999)
- Assembly Required, A Continuous School Improvement System (2002)
- Harbors of Hope: The Planning for School and Student Success Process (2005)
- What Effective Schools Do: A Fresh Look at the Correlates (2010)
- What Effective Schools Do: Re-Envisioning the Correlates (2010)
- Stepping Up: Leading the Charge to Improve Our Schools (2010)
- Student Success: How to Make It Happen (2011)

== Awards ==
- Distinguished Alumni Award Recipient, Western Michigan University (1988).
- Council of Chief State School Officers’ Distinguished Service Award (2003).
- Brock International Prize in Education (2009).

== See also ==
- Effective schools
