= Teacher leadership =

Teachers that take on additional administrative roles outside of the classroom

Teacher leadership is a term used in K-12 schools for classroom educators who simultaneously take on administrative roles outside of their classrooms to assist in functions of the larger school system. Teacher leadership tasks may include but are not limited to: managing teaching, learning, and resource allocation. Teachers who engage in leadership roles are generally experienced and respected in their field which can both empower them and increase collaboration among peers.

In these types of school environments, teachers are able to make decisions based on the work they do directly with students. When a school system places the decision-making on the teachers, the action is happening one level closer to the people who are most closely impacted by the decisions (generally the students and the teachers), rather than two or more levels above at the principal, superintendent, or school board level.

The extent to which teacher leaders adopt additional roles varies in degree and description:

Administration leadership (traditional school leadership/educational leadership):
Administrative staff carries out the majority of the leadership duties.

Teacher networks (professional learning community/professional community/networked improvement communities/community of practice/distributed leadership):

All teachers collectively take on decision-making roles about curriculum and school climate. This practice is facilitated by and supported by an administrative leader.

Teacher leaders (instructional leadership/instructional coaches):
Some teachers take on individual leadership roles that directly impact educational practices under the leadership of a school administrator.

Teacher co-ops (teacher-powered schools/teacher-led schools/worker cooperative/professional partnerships/teacherpreneurs):
All teachers collectively take on leadership and administrative tasks that would traditionally be done by a principal or administrative team

== Research supportive of the philosophy ==
The National Education Association (NEA) (2011) describes teacher leaders as, "experienced professionals who have earned the respect of their students and colleagues and have gained a set of skills that enable them to work effectively and collaboratively with colleagues. They work closely with principals who have been trained to develop and implement effective mechanisms of support for teachers and teacher leaders."

Teacher leaders are teachers who, "want to remain closely connected to the classroom and students, but are willing to assume new responsibilities that afford them leadership opportunities in or outside the classroom while still teaching full or part-time."

In his book, Kolderie (2014) cites Hubbs in describing the benefits of decentralizing the authority in schools: "You just can't beat a decentralized system. It gets closest to the level where the action really is. Education should have an advantage in moving into it, because your locations and your people are already physically dispersed."

Another potential benefit of decentralizing authority is as Spillane et al. describe: "The interactions among two or more leaders in carrying out a particular task may amount to more than the sum of those leaders' practice."

The NEA (2011) reported that, "Research indicates that in order to increase the likelihood that Gen "Y" teachers remain in the profession, they need opportunities to participate in decision making at the school and district level; a positive and supportive school culture which fosters teamwork and effective lines of communication; professional opportunities that include collaboration and technology; in-depth feedback and support from administrators and colleagues; time set aside for regular collaboration; and fair pay and a differentiated pay structure which includes rewarding outstanding performance, acquiring new knowledge and skills, and assuming new roles and responsibilities (Behrstock & Clifford, 2009)."

Kolderie (2014) emphasizes, "If teachers can control what matters for student success teachers will accept accountability for student success."

Teacherpowered.org is a resource for this kind of work, and they note that teachers, "feel increased passion for the job and have greater ability to make the dramatic changes in schools that they determine are needed to truly improve student learning and the teaching profession."

Lieberman (2000) cited Newmann and Wehlage (1995) in their search for, "an understanding of how schools developed the capacity to inspire student learning of high intellectual quality. They found that a self-conscious professional community was a salient characteristic of those schools most successful with students."

== Spectrum of authority ==
To frame the types of work in which Teacher leaders participate, it is important to look at the roles taken on by Educational leadership more broadly. Halverson, Kelley, and Shaw (2013) identify the following domains of school leadership:

1. "Focus on Learning
2. Monitoring teaching and learning
3. Building nested learning communities
4. Acquiring and allocating resources
5. Establishing a safe and effective learning environment."

Styles of school leadership can be placed on a spectrum in which on one end the leadership is completely owned by the administration to the opposite end in which leadership in completely owned by the teachers.

=== Teacher networks ===
The structure of teacher networks, or as Kruse defines them, professional communities, includes "collective responsibility, professional control, and flexible boundaries". Kruse continues to describe the day-to-day norms of a professional community, including: "reflective dialogue..., de-privatized, collective focus on student learning, collaboration, [and] shared norms and values."

Lieberman (2000) explains that, "having a professional community differentiated those teachers who worked together to change the culture of their classrooms and their departments from those teachers who either tried new ideas in fragmented ways on their own or who blamed students for their inabilities to learn."

Bryk/Gomez describe a type of teacher network, "a networked improvement community" as, "an intentionally formed social organization" whose "improvement goals impose specific demands on the rules and norms of participation."

=== Teacher leaders ===
Danielson (2006) explains, "Many schools have instituted structures in which teachers assume formal leadership roles in the school, such as master teacher, department chair, team leader, helping teacher, or mentor."

"Teachers in leadership roles work in collaboration with principals and other school administrators by facilitating improvements in instruction and promoting practices among their peers that can lead to improved student learning outcomes. By doing so, they support school leaders in encouraging innovation and creating cultures of success in school. Teacher leadership can neither be effective nor successful without principal support, but neither can the principal maximize his or her effectiveness without harnessing the talents and expertise of teachers in leadership roles."

"Teachers who serve in leadership roles may do so formally or informally. Rather than having positional authority, teachers become leaders in their schools by being respected by their peers, being continuous learners, being approachable, and using group skills and influence to improve the educational practice of their peers. They model effective practices, exercise their influence in formal and informal contexts, and support collaborative team structures within their schools."

"The Teacher Leader Model Standards consist of seven domains describing the many dimensions of teacher leadership:

- Domain I: Fostering a Collaborative Culture to Support Educator Development and Student Learning
- Domain II: Accessing and Using Research to Improve Practice and Student Learning
- Domain III: Promoting Professional Learning for Continuous Improvement
- Domain IV: Facilitating Improvements in Instruction and Student Learning
- Domain V: Promoting the Use of Assessments and Data for School and District Improvement
- Domain VI: Improving Outreach and Collaboration with Families and Community Domain VII: Advocating for Student Learning and the Profession."

One way in which teachers serve in these leadership or instructional coaching roles is to do instructional rounds in their school. Rounds consist of teachers spending time observing in one another's classrooms and then meeting to discuss the findings. City et al. describe the goals of rounds to: "1. Build skills of network members by coming to a common understanding of effective practice and how to support it. 2. Support instructional improvement at the host site (school or district) by sharing what the network learns and by building skills at the local level."

Some additional forms of teacher or instructional leadership may include: problem-solving teams, peer mentoring, and coaching, which support of the work of the administration without replacing it.

=== Teacher co-ops ===
The Teacher Powered Schools organization explains this teacher co-op or teacher-powered model as: "1. collaboratively designed and implemented by teachers. 2. teachers having collective autonomy to make the decisions influencing the success of a school, project, or professional endeavor."

In these teacher co-ops or professional partnerships, Kolderie explains, "The authority pyramid inverts, and school moves to the dual-leader model typical of partnerships in most areas. (Think of the managing partner and the administrator of a law firm, or the chief of the medical staff and the executive of a hospital.)."

The structure of a teacher co-op could vary from, "...handling the whole school [which] involves the teachers in the administration and management of the school as well as in the learning. Alternatively, teachers in a large secondary school—while continuing to be district employees—could form a partnership to handle the math department, the science department or the English department. They could then focus on learning; the principal would handle the school administration. A partnership of teachers might also organize to take responsibility for a program serving several schools across a district; Montessori, for example."

== Factors of implementation ==
Lieberman (2000) found that, "Networks that last, that hold their members, and continue to attract new teachers understand that they must account for the daily pressures of teaching, even as they seek to advance larger ideals."

In order to be successful, teacher leadership should be implemented strategically. "Among the issues that will need to be considered are:

1. resources (new or reallocated) necessary to provide professional development to teachers and administrators,
2. availability of time within schools to create a collaborative work environment,
3. re-structuring of current teacher compensation systems,
4. the development of cost-efficient, equitable, and streamlined systems to recognize and reward teachers serving in leadership roles,
5. assessing the effectiveness of various teacher leadership models, and
6. replicating and scaling-up effective teacher leadership practices."

Teacher leadership can be initiated from within the staff itself, however, it is important that the teachers have administrative support as well as peer-to-peer support to carry out their tasks. Halverson, Kelley, and Shaw (2013) reference: "Louis, Kruse and Bryk (1995) conclude that the most important task for school leaders is to create meaningful opportunities for teachers across the school to work together on pressing issues of common interest."

Kruse (1993) outlines the conditions that support teacher leadership in the specific case of a professional community:

"Structural conditions

- Time to meet
- Physical proximity
- Interdependent teaching roles
- Communication structures
- Teacher empowerment and school autonomy

Social and human resources

- Openness to improvement
- Trust and respect
- Cognitive skills base
- Supportive leadership
- Socialization of new members."

Schools may implement a teacher leadership model as a strategy to downsize and cut costs for the school. In most cases, distributing administrative among the teachers could reduce overall personnel costs.

== See also ==
- Instructional leadership
- Distributed leadership
- Educational leadership
- Professional learning community

== Sources ==
- Bryk, Anthony S., Gomez, Louis M.. 2010. Getting Ideas into Action: Building Networked Improvement Communities in Education. Frontiers in Sociology of Education. Springer Publishing.
- City, Elizabeth A., Elmore, Richard F., Fiarman, Sarah E., Teitel. Lee. 2009. Instructional Rounds in Education: A Network Approach To Improving Teaching And Learning. HARVARD EDUCATION PRESS CAMBRIDGE, MASSACHUSETTS.
- Danielson, Charlotte. 2006. Teacher Leadership That Strengthens Professional Practice. ASCD Member Book.
- Halverson, Rich; Kelley, Carolyn. Shaw, Jim. 2013. Comprehensive Assessment of Leadership for Learning: Formative Assessment for School-Wide Improvement. Submitted as a conference paper for the 2013 Annual Conference of the University Council for Education Administration.
- Kolderie, Ted. 2014. The Split Screen Strategy: Improvement + Innovation: How to Get Education Changing the Way Successful Systems Change. Beaver's Pond Press, Edina, MN. <<http://www.educationevolving.org/pdf/Book-Innovation-Plus-Improvement.pdf>>
- Kruse, S. D., Louis, K. S., & Bryk, A. S., An Emerging Framework for Analyzing School-based Professional Community. 1993. Paper presented at the Annual Meeting of the American Educational Research Association.
- Lieberman, A (2000). "Networks As Learning Communities Shaping The Future Of Teacher Development". Journal of Teacher Education. 51 (3): 221–227. doi:10.1177/0022487100051003010. S2CID 143118079.
- NEA. 2011. Teacher Leader Model Standards Teacher Leadership Exploratory Consortium. <<http://www.nea.org/assets/docs/TeacherLeaderModelStandards2011.pdf>>
- Spillane, James; Halverson, Rich; Diamond, John (2004). "Towards a Theory of Leadership Practice: a distributed perspective". Journal of Curriculum Studies. 36 (1): 3–34. doi:10.1080/0022027032000106726. S2CID 3094291.

=== Organizations, links, resources for implementation and further reading ===
- Argyris, Chris. 1991. "Teaching Smart People How to Learn." Harvard Business Review.
- Bryk, Anthony S., Sebring, Penny Bender, Allensworth, Elaine, Luppescu, Stuart, Easton, John Q. 2010. Organizing Schools for Improvement:
- Lessons from Chicago. University of Chicago Press.
- Center for Teacher Quality: <<http://www.teachingquality.org/teachertime>>
- Education Evolving Teacher Powered guide: <<http://www.teacherpowered.org/>>
- EdVisions <<edvisions.com>>
- Farris-Berg, Kim, Dirkswager, Edward J. 2012. Trusting Teachers with School Success: What Happens When Teachers Call the Shots. Rowman & Littlefield Publishers.
- Frost, David, Durrant, Judy. 2002. "Teachers as Leaders: Exploring the impact of teacher-led development work". Pages 143–161. School Leadership & Management: Formerly School Organisation. Volume 22, Issue 2. <<http://www.tandfonline.com/doi/abs/10.1080/1363243022000007728#.VO-kN1PF_FI>>
- Grunow, Alicia. Frontiers in Sociology of Education, edited by Maureen Hallinan, Springer Publishing. July 2011.
- Halverson, Richard R.. 2003. Systems of Practice: How Leaders Use Artifacts to Create Professional Community in Schools. To be published: Education Policy Analysis Archives.
- Halverson, Richard. 2010. School Formative Feedback Systems. PEABODY JOURNAL OF EDUCATION, 85: 130–146.
- Hawkins, Beth. "Teacher Cooperative: What Happens When Teachers Run the School?" <https://educationnext.org/teacher-cooperatives/>
- Innovative Schools Network <<innovativeschoolsnetwork.com>>
- Kerchner, Charles Taylor, Steen Mulfinger, Laura. 2010. "Can Teachers Run Their Own Schools? Tales from the Islands of Teacher Cooperatives." Claremont Graduate University. 2010. <http://www.educationevolving.org/pdf/Can-Teachers-Run-Their-Own-Schools.pdf>
- McGhan, B. 2002. "A Fundamental Education Reform: Teacher-Led Schools". The Phi Delta Kappan. Vol. 83, No. 7 (Mar., 2002), pp. 538–540. <<https://www.jstor.org/stable/20440190?seq=1#page_scan_tab_contents>>
- Muijs, Daniel; Harris, Alma (2006). "Teacher led school improvement: Teacher leadership in the UK". Teaching and Teacher Education. 22 (8): 961–972. doi:10.1016/j.tate.2006.04.010.
- Newmann, Fred, King, M. Bruce, Carmichael, Dana L. 2007. Common Standards for Rigor and Relevance in Teaching Academic Subjects. Iowa Department of Education.
- Resnick, Lauren B (2010). "Nested Learning Systems for the Thinking Curriculum". Educational Researcher. 39 (3): 183–197. doi:10.3102/0013189x10364671. S2CID 18992558.
