= Distributed leadership =

Organizational theory

Distributed leadership is a conceptual and analytical approach to understanding how the work of leadership takes place among the people and in context of a complex organization. Though developed and primarily used in education research, it has since been applied to other domains, including business and even tourism. Rather than focus on characteristics of the individual leader or features of the situation, distributed leadership foregrounds how actors engage in tasks that are "stretched" or distributed across the organization. With theoretical foundations in activity theory and distributed cognition, understanding leadership from a distributed perspective means seeing leadership activities as a situated and social process at the intersection of leaders, followers, and the situation.

== Background and origins ==
Distributed leadership emerged in the early 2000s from sociological, cognitive, psychological, and anthropological theories, most importantly distributed cognition and activity theory, though also influenced by Wenger's communities of practice. It was conceived as a theoretical and analytical framework for studying school leadership, one that would explicitly focus attention on how leadership was enacted in schools, as an activity stretched across the "social and situational contexts."

Leadership research up through the late 1990s focused on the specific traits, functions, or effects of individual leaders. Much of the work done in educational research focused exclusively on the principal and centered around defining the heroics of individuals. Descriptions were written of what was being done but not how, which limited transferability across contexts. From this research it was unclear how leaders responded to the complex environment in schools. Though some research on leadership has continued to focus on the role or function of the designated leader, such as instructional leadership or transformational leadership, there has also been a significant shift to understanding leadership as a shared effort by more than one person. The latter constructs look more broadly at various roles that provide forms of leadership throughout the school, including teacher leadership, democratic leadership, shared leadership, or collaborative leadership. Distributed leadership draws on these multi-agent perspectives to describe how actors work to establish the conditions for improving teaching and learning in schools. Distributed leadership is not an activity, rather a procedure

== Key concepts ==
Leadership is defined as any "activities tied to the core work of the organization that are designed by organizational members to influence the motivation, knowledge, affect, or practices of other organizational members." Thus a leader is anyone who engages in these activities based on tasks, not position. As this definition implies, there is within an organization a group of people who are influenced by these leadership activities: these are the followers. Importantly, the role of a leader or follower is dynamic, and a person might be a follower in one situation but not in another. Additionally, followers are not passive recipients of these influences and followers may influence the leaders as well.

=== Leader Plus ===
The Leader Plus aspect posits leadership activity as a whole is stretched, or distributed, across many people. Leadership is often enacted with those not in official leadership positions, thus distributed leadership examines enactments of leadership activity rather than roles. The configurations of leadership activity might include collaborated, collective, or coordinated distribution. Collaborated distribution is where two or more leaders co-perform the leadership activity in the same place and time. In collective distribution, the performance of leadership actions is separate but the actions are interdependent. Coordinated distribution exists where the leadership activities are performed in a particular sequence. Leadership activities are dynamic and situated, thus these three categories do not correspond with particular types of activities or duties. This part of the framework foregrounds leadership activities and all individuals who contribute, avoiding the tendency to focus solely on designated leaders.

=== Practice ===
Practice is the product of interactions amongst leaders, followers, the situation over time. This is a key link to distributed cognition, where thinking and understanding is a process constituted of interactions with other people, tools, and routines, rather than independently. Research from a distributed perspective often takes a task-oriented approach as a way to break down practice into manageable units of analysis. Understanding how tasks are carried out and which are deemed important by leaders and followers gives a window into practice.

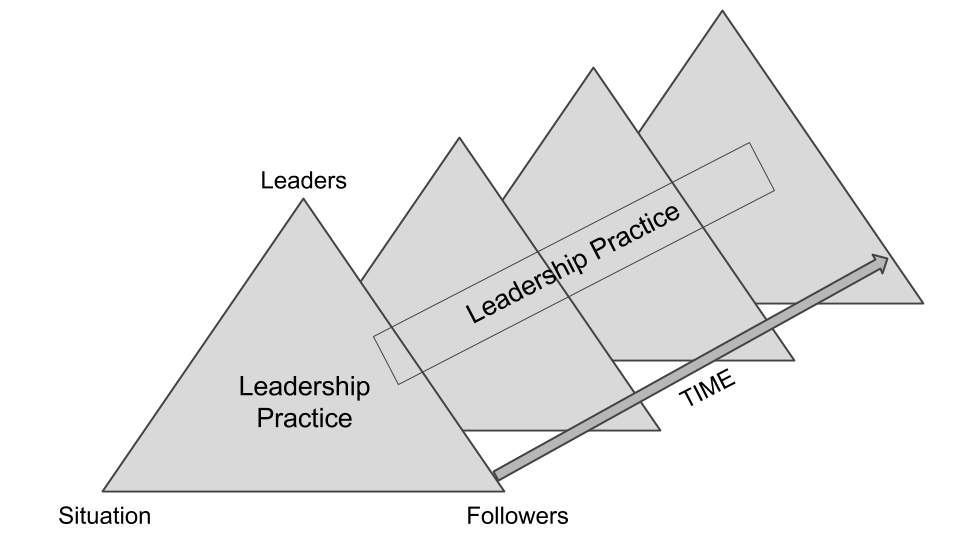
This is a diagram to understand how leadership practice is stretched across leaders, followers, the situation, and time.

=== Situation ===
The situation comprises a complex web of material and social aspects of the environment, such as history, culture, physical environmental features, and policy environment, as well as more local aspects such as task complexity, organizational structure, or staff stability. The key here is to identify and focus on the "aspects of the situation that enable and constrain leadership practice but also captur[e] how they shape that practice." Whereas Contingency Theory describes the situation as merely the context within which individuals act, a distributed perspective looks to the situation as constitutive, in the sense that it both influences and is influenced by the actions of the people in it.

Two aspects of the situation that are often foregrounded in a distributed perspective are tools and routines. Tools are objects designed with a purpose toward enabling some action. Perhaps the most obvious example of a tool is a hammer. In organizations, however, tools might be a rubric for assessing teaching or an attendance checklist. They are not just accessories or incidentals; they both enable and constrain practice. Tools help focus the users attention but can also obscure other elements. The attendance taker might check off all those students present and think the task is complete but fail to notice a student that is present but not on the list. In this way, the tool is constitutive of the task, not just an accessory. A routine is a regular sequence or pattern of actions that happen in an organization. This may or may not align with the tools. For example, with a rubric for assessing teaching, the associated routine might be when and how an instructional leader observes a class, such as instructional rounds. Tools, routines, and other aspects of the situation might be locally designed, received, or inherited.

Importantly, tools and routines take a portion of the cognitive load required to complete a task (see Distributed Cognition). In the example of the rubric for assessing teaching, the principal doing the observations will be prompted for what to pay attention to and the routine will improve a consistency to the observation practice. Thus the enactment of leaderships in this situation is distributed across the principal, the teacher being observed, and the routine.

== Foundational theories ==
Distributed cognition sits at the intersection of psychology, sociology, and cognitive science. It is essentially the theory that knowledge and the thinking with that knowledge are stretched across the tools, situation, other people, and context. It originated with the work of anthropologist Edwin Hutchins in the 1990s with his studies of navigation on a naval aircraft carrier. His work on understanding naturally situated cognition led to the conclusion that cognition is socially distributed. Rather than looking for knowledge structures within an individual, his work showed that cognitive activity, or knowing what to do, was a situated process, influenced by other people, tools, and the situation.

Leadership is often studied as something that is done or acted out by an individual. Social or shared leadership approaches often still see leadership as actions done by individuals, just done in cooperation with others. Taking a distributed perspective, in contrast, draws on the theory of distributed cognition to understand leadership is an emergent property of the system. In this way, it sits in between those who see leadership is a result of individual agency and those who see it as an outcome of the situation.

Activity Theory is a broad social sciences approach to understanding human behavior as contextualized in a situation. This situated perspective expands the unit of analysis to the collective rather than individual and studies the relation between actions. Although this approach is aimed at understanding the individual, the unit of analysis is the broader system in which that individual participates. Engestrom identifies three generations of activity theory and associated researcher: first generation, a model focused on the individual (subject-object-mediating artifact) by Lev Vygotsky (1978); second generation, expansion of the model to include collective action, by Alexei Leont'ev (1981); and third generation, toward a networked understanding of interactive activity systems, proposed by Engestrom himself (1987). Another Activity Theory scholar, Barbara Rogoff expands this work in two ways: first, foregrounding of the individual must be done without losing sight of the interdependence of the system; and second, there are three different levels of resolution (interpersonal, cultural/community, and institutional/cultural planes) are needed to understand the different levels activity. A distributed perspective on leadership takes this networked and multi-level approach to give "context of action" and "maintain... the tension between agency and distribution.

Additionally, Spillane and Gronn both draw on an application of activity theory in the field of leadership research that grew out of Mintzberg's studies of work-activity, observing managers through structured observations to document what they actually do. While innovative and exciting at the time, the nature of this documentation was ultimately deemed shallow as it did not differentiate between what was managerial and non-managerial work, there were still unanswered questions about how management was enacted, and it did not explain leadership effectiveness.

Understanding leadership from a distributed perspective means looking for leadership activity as situated and social process, drawing on both distributed cognition and activity theory.

== Usage of the term ==
"Distributed leadership" entered the leadership and organizational theory discourse and clearly appealed to various scholars, policy makers, administrators, and practitioners as they have used it to frame, describe, and promote their work. Some use it as a recipe for effective leadership or improving schools; others use it to prescribe optimal leadership or organizational structure. The most common alternative usage is equating distributed leadership with more than one designated leader, ideas such as shared, democratic, or collaborative leadership. Studies along these lines often look at the distribution of leadership roles. Interest in these alternative organizational structures reflect the increased demands on leaders in schools and changes in the demands on educational organizations, and the term "distributed leadership" gets used to represent this. Some worry that this overlap in usage results in a watering down of ideas or rebranding of old ideas in new terms.

A distinction that helps unravel the mixed usage is to distinguish between distributed leadership as a conceptual or analytical framework versus distributed leadership as a normative or practical framework. Taking an analytical perspective is to understand leadership activities as a product of the interactions amongst leaders, followers, and the situation. This reflects the roots of the framework in distributed cognition and activity theory. A practical or normative approach is concerned with optimizing the distribution of leadership so as to improve organizations. In this case, research is focused on the effects of certain configurations of leadership roles or activities. While the use of Distributed Leadership as a term will continue to evolve as scholarship on the topic continues to develop, this distinction is important in maintaining common epistemologies for researchers, policy makers, administrators, and practitioners.

== General references ==
- Bolden, Richard (September 2011). "Distributed Leadership in Organizations: A Review of Theory and Research". International Journal of Management Reviews. 13 (3): 251–269. doi:10.1111/j.1468-2370.2011.00306.x.
- Harris, A. (2008). Distributed School Leadership: Developing tomorrow's leaders. New York: Routledge.
- Halverson, R. R. (2003). "Systems of practice: How leaders use artifacts to create professional community in schools". Education Policy Analysis Archives. 11: 1–34. doi:10.14507/epaa.v11n37.2003.
- Hutchins, E. (1995). Cognition in the Wild. Boston: MIT Press.
- Gronn, P (2008). "The future of distributed leadership". Journal of Educational Administration. 46 (2): 141–158. doi:10.1108/09578230810863235.
- Spillane, J. (2006). Distributed leadership. San Francisco: Jossey-Bass.
- Spillane, J. & Diamond, J. (2007). Distributed Leadership in Practice. New York: Teachers College Press.
- Spillane, J. P., Halverson, R., & Diamond, J. B. (2001). Investigating School Leadership Practice: A Distributed Perspective. Educational Researcher, (April), 23–28.
- Spillane, J. P.; Halverson, R.; Diamond, J. B. (2004). "Towards a theory of leadership practice: a distributed perspective". Journal of Curriculum Studies. 36 (1): 3–34. doi:10.1080/0022027032000106726. S2CID 3094291.
