= Instructional rounds =

Method for improving teaching practices

Conducting instructional rounds is a process that school districts and schools use to better understand teaching and learning in schools in order to improve learning at scale. In an instructional rounds session, a group of educators, from perhaps 20 to 40 in size, makes a series of visits to multiple classrooms to observe what is taking place in the instructional core (the interactions between students and teachers in the presence of content). Low inference observation notes are taken about a learning problem (a "problem of practice") identified by the school being observed. The observation notes are used to create a data picture of what has been seen in teaching and learning practices throughout the school. It is these data and practices that are shared with the school, not information about individual teachers or students. Adapted from the practice of grand rounds in medical school, the aim of instructional rounds is to observe teaching and learning to discern root causes for problems identified by the school and to help the school and district create more productive outcomes. Distinct from supervision and evaluation, instructional rounds are used to describe what is happening in classrooms and to share observations with educators - and are not intended to be evaluative.

== Origin ==
The process of instructional rounds was adapted from medical rounds model that is used in schools of medicine and teaching hospitals to improve practice of prospective and current doctors in diagnosing and curing patients. Physicians use medical rounds as a major way of improving their theory and practice. "In the most commonly used version of medical rounds, a group of medical interns, residents, and supervising or attending physicians visit patients, observe and discuss the evidence for diagnoses, and, after a thorough analysis of evidence, discuss possible treatments."

== Description of common practice ==
Instructional rounds include several steps: formation of a network that ideally includes representative members from all those who impact student learning; choosing a problem to be addressed; classroom observation; observation debrief; detection of the next steps, and regular repetition of this process.

=== Network formation ===
Network formation involves the gathering of educators who will regularly meet with each other to do rounds. There are not specific criteria sets for the creation of networks, it depends on the situation, time and preferences of educators. Different kinds of networks could be used to do rounds. Some of them are cross-functional in which teachers and administrators work together, while others are homogeneous in nature composed of superintendents or teachers exclusively. Instructional rounds could be integrated into existing networks or specially formed new networks of educators. Sometimes members of the network are selected intentionally, according to the subject, content they teach or problem area they share. Other networks are more pragmatic, for instance, teachers with the same planning time engage in rounds together.

=== Choosing problem of practice ===
The problem of practice is a specific issue that the school needs constructive feedback on, worries about or struggles against. The problem should be observable and focused on improving teaching. It is unsolved problem that the school has spent time and money to address, but it is in further need of assistance. There are different ways of identifying problems of practice. The best way is to relate these problems to continuous school improvement and to proceed based on data. To determine the problem of practice sometimes the entire staff gathers or only the leadership team meets to identify a problem.

An example of a problem of practice could be the following: "In reading and writing, our students seem to be doing relatively well on decoding, vocabulary, and simple writing tasks, but they are not doing as well as we had hoped on comprehension free-response tasks. Teachers have begun using a workshop method to work with smaller groups of students, but there is no consistency in what happens in those small groups".

=== Classroom observation ===
After determining the problem of practice, the network splits into smaller groups of 4-5 teachers that visit approximately 4-5 classrooms for 25 minutes each. Observers collect descriptive data rather than evaluative, meaning that they do not have any rubrics to guide them. Observers do have guiding questions associated with the problem they are investigating. For instance, 'What are students and teachers doing and saying?,' 'What is the assignment?,' 'What do students do when they do not understand the concept or instruction?'.

Observers do not look at every issue in the classroom, but only those connected with the problem of practice. For instance, if the issue is lack of higher order thinking skills among students, observers do not pay attention on behavior and attendance of students, their involvement in the task, or teacher behavior, such as writing objectives on the board. Observers attempt to find the cause of the existing problem of practice in school and then identify a viable cure for it.

It is very important that observers do not talk between class observations and save everything they saw, their descriptive feedback, for the official debrief.

=== Observation debrief ===
The process of debrief consists of three steps: description, analysis, and prediction. During the description stage, all groups of the network meet together and share their evidence that pertains to the problem of practice with the others. The evidence should be specific and descriptive rather than evaluative and general. Regular practice and peer help could facilitate learning to collect specific and descriptive evidence.

Having gathered a set of evidence, the network can begin analyzing it by looking at trends, patterns, and exceptions across the data. Examples of patterns could be: Students are divided into groups, but work individually; teacher asks simple questions that requires short 1-2 words answers. Each groups of teachers share trends and patterns that have seen. This could help educators to determine common patterns in subject area, grade level and across school. However, sometimes patterns could vary in each subject or grade level.

At the prediction stage observers answer to the following question, “If you were a student in these classes today and you did everything the teacher asked you to do, what would you know and be able to do?” This question is asked to see what students could learn as a result of the completed assignments and tasks in the class. The responses of the observers could be: Learners will be able to solve mathematical problems, recall information, etc.

=== Detection of the next steps ===
There are different ways of detecting next steps of work. Some networks brainstorm action plans for the following week, next month or by the end of educational year. Other networks creates reflective questions to reflect
