= Carol Ann Tomlinson =

American educator, author and speaker

- Occupations: Educator, author and speaker
- Writing career
- Language: English
- Subject: Differentiation in education
- Notable works: How to Differentiate Instruction in a Mixed Ability Classroom, The Differentiated Classroom: Responding to the Needs of All Learners, Leadership for Differentiated Schools and Classrooms

Carol Ann Tomlinson is an American educator, author and speaker. She is known for her work with differentiated instruction, a means of meeting students' individual needs in education. Tomlinson is a reviewer for eight journals and has authored over 300 articles and books including The Differentiated Classroom: Responding to the Needs of All Learners, which has been described as a seminal work in the field of differentiated instruction.

Tomlinson also participates in several web-related professional development services, including webinars with EdWeek.org and an online Differentiated Instruction course with Knowledge Delivery Systems.

Tomlinson has a background in German, English, education, technological studies in youth education and drama, reading, speech pathology, gifted education, and curriculum and instruction for creative and critical thinking.
