= Differentiated instruction =

Framework or philosophy for effective teaching

Differentiated instruction and assessment, also known as differentiated learning or, in education, simply differentiation, is a framework or philosophy for effective teaching that involves providing students different avenues for understanding new information in terms of acquiring content, processing, constructing, or making sense of ideas, and developing teaching materials and assessment measures so that students can learn effectively regardless of differences in their ability.

Differentiated instruction means using different tools, content, and due process in order to successfully reach all individuals. According to Carol Ann Tomlinson, it is the process of "ensuring that what a student learns, how he or she learns it, and how the student demonstrates what he or she has learned is a match for that student's readiness level, interests, and preferred mode of learning."

According to Boelens et al., differentiation can be on two different levels; the administration level and the classroom level. The administration level takes the socioeconomic status and gender of students into consideration. At the classroom level, differentiation revolves around content, processing, product, and effects. On the content level, teachers adapt what they are teaching to meet the needs of students, which can mean making content more challenging or simplified for students based on their levels. The process of learning can be differentiated as well. Teachers may choose to teach one student at a time, or assign problems to small groups, partners or the whole group depending on the needs of the students. By differentiating the product, teachers can decide how students present what they have learned. This may take the form of videos, graphic organizers, photo presentations, writing, and oral presentations.

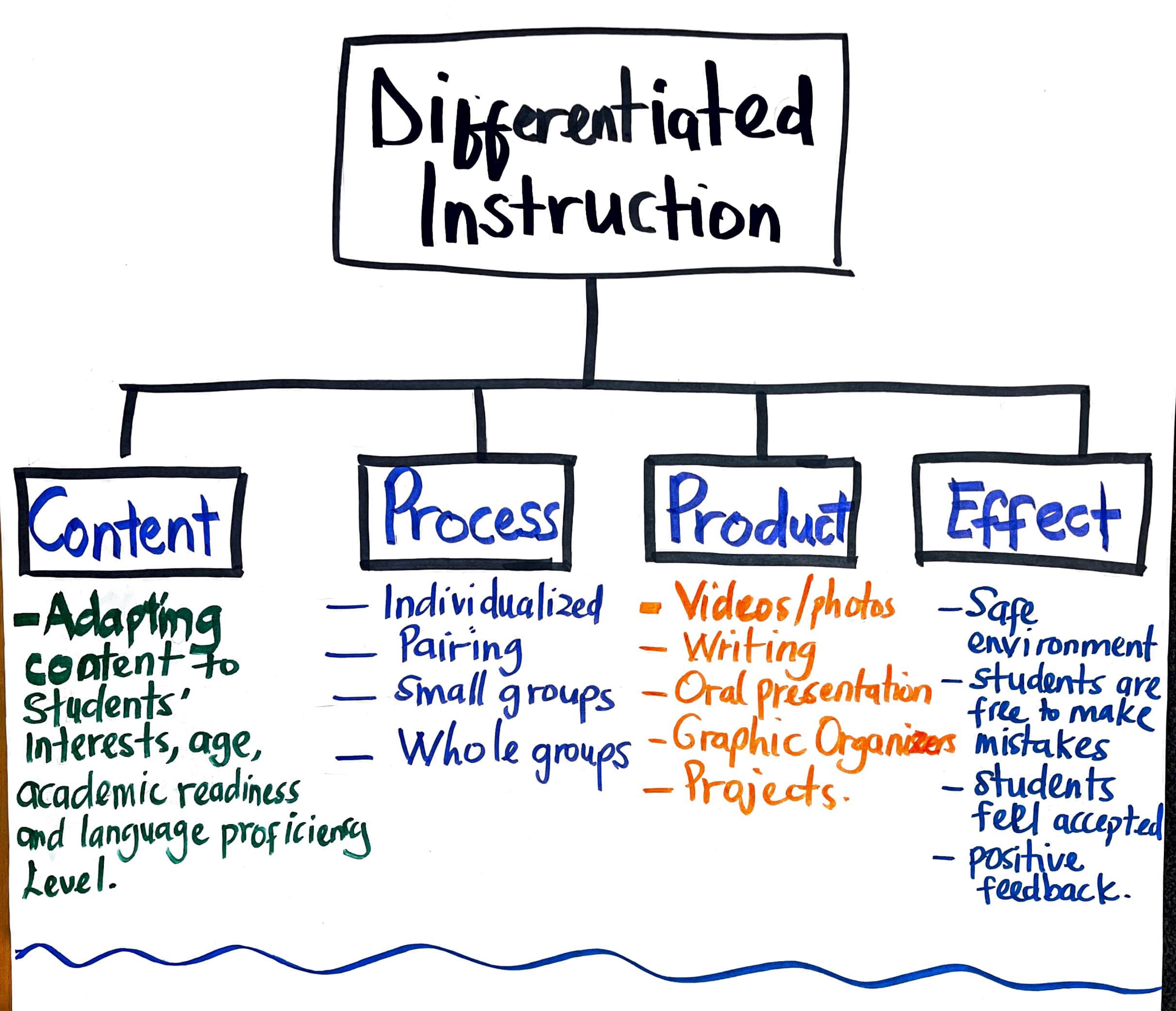
Differentiation at a glance

When language is the factor for differentiation, the Sheltered Instruction Observation Protocol (SIOP) strongly supports and guides teachers to differentiate instruction in English as ESL learners who have a range of learning ability levels—beginning, intermediate and advanced. Here, differentiated instruction entails adapting a new instructional strategy that teachers of typical classrooms of native English speakers would have no need for.

Differentiated classrooms have also been described as responding to student variety in readiness levels, interests, and learning profiles. Such classrooms include all students and allow all of them to succeed. To do this, a teacher sets different expectations for task completion for students, specifically based upon their individual needs. Teachers can differentiate through content, process, product, and learning environment based on the individual learner. Differentiation stems from beliefs about differences among learners, how they learn, learning preferences, and individual interests, so it is therefore an organized and flexible way to proactively adjust teaching and learning methods to accommodate each child's learning needs and preferences in order to help them achieve maximum growth.

== Pre-assessment ==
Pre-assessment is used to determine a student's knowledge, understanding and skill prior to the unit of study so that the coverage of mastered material and the use of ineffective methods are avoided. These are assessments for learning and include diagnostic or pre-assessments that teachers use to help guide instruction and benefit each learner. They are informal and provide qualitative feedback to teachers and students to address strengths and needs during the unit. Pre-assessments are to be conducted several weeks before the unit of study and are not to be graded.

Chapman and King (2005) note that when "teachers strategically administer pre-assessments before planning their lessons, they can address the students' strengths and needs during instruction." Pre-assessment can be conducted in two ways:

1. By identifying learning preferences and interests (i.e. Gardner's Multiple Intelligence test, or Visual, Auditory, or Kinesthetic learner)
2. By identifying knowledge of students' understanding (i.e. checklists, quizzes, class discussion, portfolios, entry/exit cards, anticipation guides, journals, self-reflections)

Both of these types of pre-assessment are used to design student tasks, particularly when a student might require support, enrichment, or have different learning styles, intelligence, or interests.

== Ongoing assessment ==
Assessment is the process of gathering information from a variety of sources such as assignments, teacher observations, class discussions, and tests and quizzes. Assessment at regular intervals informs instructional strategies, gauges each student's readiness, interests, and learning preferences, and improves student learning. This information can be gathered through diagnostic (pre-assessments), formative, and summative assessments, as well as Individual Education Plans, Ontario Student Records, student interest surveys, and multiple intelligence or learning style inventories.

Assessment for learning includes diagnostic (or pre-assessment) measures and formative assessment. Formative assessments are used during a unit to provide understanding about what the student is learning, and continually guide instructional decisions. Assessment as learning takes place when students self-assess their work and reflect on their growth as learners. Earl (2003) says this is the process in metacognition, and "occurs when students personally monitor what they are learning and use feedback . . . to make adjustments, adaptations, and . . . changes in what they understand."

Differentiation can be used when applying, demonstrating, extending knowledge, or practicing skills and attitudes to monitor achievement of goals. This might include peer/self-assessments, and peer/teacher conferences. Assessment of learning is the culminating task or summative assessment, which takes place after the learning has occurred and students can show what concepts and/or skills they have learned. Differentiation can also be used through strategies such as tests, projects, demonstrations, and writing performances.

All these ongoing assessments help teachers know students and their needs so they can select effective teaching and learning strategies and interventions that maximize student achievement. Consistent program review and diagnosis of whole-class and individual student responses provide ongoing feedback to enhance teaching and learning for teachers, students, and parents. Teachers use ongoing assessments to gather information about a student's knowledge and capabilities, direct future planning, monitor student progress, and evaluate student achievement. Students and parents can also use these assessments to reflect and understand their own learning preferences and level of achievement.

== Content ==
The content of lessons may be differentiated based on what students already know. The most basic content of a lesson should cover the standards of learning set by the district or state. Some students in a class may be completely unfamiliar with the concepts in a lesson, some students may have partial mastery of the content or display mistaken ideas about the content, and some students may show mastery of the content before the lesson begins. The teacher may differentiate the content by designing activities for groups of students that cover different areas of Bloom's taxonomy. For example, students who are unfamiliar with the concepts may be required to complete tasks on the lower levels of Bloom's taxonomy: knowledge, comprehension, and application. Students with partial mastery may be asked to complete tasks in the application, analysis and evaluation areas, and students who have high levels of mastery may be asked to complete tasks in evaluation and synthesis.

When teachers differentiate content, they may adapt what they want students to learn or how students gain knowledge, understanding, and skills. In these instances, educators are not varying student objectives or lowering performance standards for students. They use different texts, novels, or short stories at a reading level appropriate for each individual student. Another example would be including visuals, maps, or graphic organizers to introduce or reinforce concepts as opposed to only providing written or oral text. This provides students with different methods of viewing, considering and absorbing content. Teachers can also use flexible groups and have students assigned to like groups listening to audiobooks or accessing specific internet sources. Students could have a choice to work in pairs, groups, or individually, but all students are working towards the same standards and objectives.

=== Understanding by Design ===
Understanding by Design (UbD), which was developed by Grant Wiggins, is an educational strategy that may be used to inform content in a differentiated classroom. This model was further refined by Carol Ann Tomlinson and Jay McTighe, who maintained that UbD and differentiated instruction form an essential partnership. Their position is that learning occurs not at the individual level or to the individual, but within the individual students as they are engaged in exploring concepts. The combination of UbD and differentiated instruction is expected to allow educators to simultaneously "craft powerful curriculum in a standards-dominated era and ensure academic success for the full spectrum of learners."

UbD is described as a backward design model that emphasizes the beginning with the end in mind. Here, planning the courses, units, and individual lessons is undertaken based on the desired result. For instance, when teaching a literary piece, the teacher first decides the goal and how the students will be assessed to determine if such goal is achieved. The framework also recognizes the importance of assessment and employs evaluative or summative assessment models as the bases of grading.

== Process ==
Pre-assessment and ongoing assessment provide feedback that helps teachers understand how students learn and what they know, with the ultimate goal of improving student learning. In the past, delivery of instruction often followed a "one size fits all" approach. In contrast, differentiation is individually student-centered and focused on appropriate, fair, flexible and challenging instructional and assessment tools that meaningfully engage students in the curriculum. By considering varied learning needs, teachers can develop personalized instruction so their students can learn effectively.

The process of learning may be differentiated for students based on their learning styles, accounting for standards of performance that are required for the age level. This stage of differentiation allows students to learn based either on what method is easiest for them to gain knowledge, or what may challenge them most. Some students may prefer to read about a topic (or may require practice in reading), and others may prefer to listen (or require practice in listening), or acquire knowledge by manipulating objects associated with the content. Information may be presented in multiple ways by the teacher, and may be based on any available methods or materials. Many teachers use areas of multiple intelligences to provide learning opportunities.

Commonalities in the assessment results lead to grouping practices that are designed to meet the students' needs. How teachers plan to deliver instructions is based on assessment results that show the needs, learning styles, interests, and levels of prior knowledge. Differentiated classrooms may allow some students to work alone if this is their best modality for a particular task.

Differentiating by process refers to how a student comes to understand and assimilate facts, concepts and skills. After teaching a lesson, a teacher might break students into small "ability" groups based on their readiness and give each group a series of questions based on each group's appropriate level of readiness-skills, related to the objectives of the lesson. Students could also be grouped based on their learning styles. The main idea behind this is that students are at different levels and learn in different ways, so a teacher cannot teach them all the same way.

Another model of differentiation, layered curriculum, offers students a choice of assignments, but requires that they demonstrate learning to pass the assignment. This eliminates the need for pre-assessment and is useful for teachers with large class loads, such as in high school.

== Product ==
The product is essentially what the student produces at the end of the lesson to demonstrate the mastery of the content: tests, evaluations, projects, reports, or other activities. Based on students' skill levels and educational standards, teachers may assign students to complete activities that demonstrate mastery of an educational concept (writing a report), or in a method the student prefers (composing an original song about the content, or building a 3-dimensional object that explains mastery of concepts in the lesson or unit). The product is an integral component of the differentiated model, as preparation of the assessments determines both the 'what' and 'how' of instruction delivery.

When an educator differentiates by product or performance, they are affording students various ways of demonstrating what they have learned from the lesson or unit. It is done by using menu unit sheets, choice boards or open-ended lists of final product options. It is meant to allow students to show what they learned based on their learning preferences, interests and strengths.

Examples of differentiated structures include layered curriculum, tiered instruction, tic-tac-toe extension menus, Curry/Samara models, RAFT writing activities, and similar designs. (See external links below.)

In differentiated instruction, teachers respond to students' readiness, instructional needs, interests and learning preferences and provide opportunities for students to work in varied instructional formats. Classrooms that utilize differentiated instruction are learner-responsive, teacher-facilitated classrooms where students can meet curriculum foundation objectives. Lessons may be on inquiry-based, problem-based and project-based instruction.

While significant research has shown the effectiveness of product-based differentiated instruction at primary and secondary level, effective use has also been demonstrated in higher education in some circumstances.

== Learning environment ==
Differentiation through environment creates the conditions for optimal learning to take place. According to C. A. Tomlinson, "Environment will support or deter the student's quest for affirmation, contribution, power, purpose, and challenge in the classroom".

The learning environment includes the physical layout of the classroom, the way that the teacher uses the space, environmental elements and sensitivities including lighting, as well as the overall atmosphere of the classroom. The teacher's goal is to create a positive, structured environment that is supportive for each student, flexible with varied types of furniture and arrangements, and includes areas for quiet individual work and areas for group work and collaboration.

The method of flexible seating is used to differentiate seating assignments within the learning environment. In this model, students choose the type of seating and location in classrooms within teacher guidelines. Teachers are to be sensitive and alert to ways that the classroom environment supports students' ability to interact with others and to employ classroom management techniques that support a safe and supportive learning environment.

== Improving parental understanding ==
According to Carol Ann Tomlinson, most parents are eager for their students to learn, grow, succeed and feel accepted in school. A differentiated classroom may "look different" from what parents expect. The teacher can help them develop a clear and positive understanding of differentiated instruction and how it benefits their children by letting parents know that:

- The goal of differentiated instruction is to ensure that all students grow in all key skills and knowledge areas and encourage them to move on from their starting points to become more independent learners.
- In a differentiated classroom, the teacher closely assesses and monitors skills, knowledge levels, and interests to determine effective ways for students to learn; the teacher's lesson plan is drawn up with those various skills, levels, and interests in mind.
- Differentiated lessons reflect the teacher's best understanding of what will best help a child to grow in understanding and skill at a given moment. That understanding evolves as the course continues, as the child develops, and as parents contribute to teachers' understanding.
- When parents come to school and talk about their children, they share their perspectives with the teacher. The teacher views the student more broadly, specifically in relation to students of the same age and in light of developmental benchmarks. The parent, on the other hand, has a deeper sense of the student's interests, feelings, and changes over time. The combination of the wide-angle lens viewpoint of the teacher with the close up lens of the parents results in a fuller picture for everyone.

== Criticism ==
Education critics on theories of different learning styles have used this as an avenue to criticize differentiated instruction. One source includes Mike Schmoker of Education Week, who claims that after a lengthy email exchange with an architect of DI, she conceded "There [is] no solid research or school evidence" in support of differentiated instruction.

In Educational Research, John Geake states, "the evidence consistently shows that modifying a teaching approach to cater for differences in learning styles does not result in any improvement in learning outcomes," and that implementing learning styles, citing VAK specifically, does "not reflect how our brains actually learn, nor the individual differences we observe in classrooms."

In Psychological Science for the Public Interest, Pashler et al. note, "the literature fails to provide adequate support for applying learning-style assessments in school settings. Moreover, several studies that used appropriate research designs found evidence that contradicted the learning-styles hypothesis...[W]e feel that the widespread use of learning-style measures in educational settings is unwise and a wasteful use of limited resources."

== See also ==
- Tracking (education)
