= 1935 in Michigan =

- Decades: 1910s; 1920s; 1930s; 1940s; 1950s
- See also: History of Michigan; Historical outline of Michigan; List of years in Michigan; 1935 in the United States

Events from the year 1935 in Michigan.

== Office holders ==
=== State office holders ===
- Governor of Michigan: Frank Fitzgerald (Republican)
- Lieutenant Governor of Michigan: Thomas Reed (Republican)
- Michigan Attorney General: Harry S. Toy/David H. Crowley
- Michigan Secretary of State: Orville E. Atwood (Republican)
- Speaker of the Michigan House of Representatives: George A. Schroeder
- Chief Justice, Michigan Supreme Court: William W. Potter

=== Mayors of major cities ===
- Mayor of Detroit: Frank Couzens (Republican)
- Mayor of Grand Rapids: William Timmers
- Mayor of Flint: George E. Boysen
- Mayor of Dearborn: John Carey
- Mayor of Saginaw: Ben N. Mercer
- Mayor of Lansing: Max A. Templeton
- Mayor of Ann Arbor: Robert A. Campbell

=== Federal office holders ===
- U.S. Senator from Michigan: James J. Couzens (Republican)
- U.S. Senator from Michigan: Arthur Vandenberg (Republican)
- House District 1: George G. Sadowski (Democrat)
- House District 2: Earl C. Michener (Republican)
- House District 3: Henry M. Kimball (Republican)
- House District 4: Clare Hoffman (Republican)
- House District 5: Carl E. Mapes (Republican)
- House District 6: William W. Blackney (Republican)
- House District 7: Jesse P. Wolcott (Republican)
- House District 8: Fred L. Crawford (Republican)
- House District 9: Albert J. Engel (Republican)
- House District 10: Roy O. Woodruff (Republican)
- House District 11: Prentiss M. Brown (Democrat)
- House District 12: Frank Eugene Hook (Democrat)
- House District 13: Clarence J. McLeod (Republican)
- House District 14: Louis C. Rabaut (Democrat)
- House District 15: John D. Dingell Sr. (Democrat)
- House District 16: John Lesinski Sr. (Democrat)
- House District 17: George Anthony Dondero (Republican)

== Population ==
In the 1930 United States census, Michigan was recorded as having a population of 4,842,325, ranking as the seventh most populous state in the country. By 1940, Michigan's population had increased by 8.5% to 5,256,106.

=== Cities ===
The following is a list of cities in Michigan with a population of at least 20,000 based on 1930 U.S. Census data. Historic census data from 1920 and 1940 is included to reflect trends in population increases or decreases. Cities that are part of the Detroit metropolitan area are shaded in tan.

1930 Rank	City	County	1920 Pop.	1930 Pop.	1940 Pop.	Change 1930-40
1	Detroit	Wayne	993,678	1,568,662	1,623,452	3.5%
2	Grand Rapids	Kent	137,634	168,592	164,292	−2.6%
3	Flint	Genesee	91,599	156,492	151,543	−3.2%
4	Saginaw	Saginaw	61,903	80,715	82,794	2.6%
5	Lansing	Ingham	57,327	78,397	78,753	0.5%
6	Pontiac	Oakland	34,273	64,928	66,626	2.6%
7	Hamtramck	Wayne	48,615	56,268	49,839	−11.4%
8	Jackson	Jackson	48,374	55,187	49,656	−10.0%
9	Kalamazoo	Kalamazoo	48,487	54,786	54,097	−1.3%
10	Highland Park	Wayne	46,499	52,959	50,810	−4.1%
11	Dearborn	Wayne	2,470	50,358	63,589	26.3%
12	Bay City	Bay	47,554	47,355	47,956	1.3%
13	Battle Creek	Calhoun	36,164	45,573	43,453	−4.7%
14	Muskegon	Muskegon	36,570	41,390	47,697	15.2%
15	Port Huron	St. Clair	25,944	31,361	32,759	4.5%
16	Wyandotte	Wayne	13,851	28,368	30,618	7.9%
17	Ann Arbor	Washtenaw	19,516	26,944	29,815	10.7%
18	Royal Oak	Oakland	6,007	22,904	25,087	9.5%
19	Ferndale	Oakland	2,640	20,855	22,523	8.0%

=== Counties ===
The following is a list of counties in Michigan with populations of at least 50,000 based on 1930 U.S. Census data. Historic census data from 1920 and 1940 are included to reflect trends in population increases or decreases.

1930 Rank	County	Largest city	1920 Pop.	1930 Pop.	1940 Pop.	Change 1930-40
1	Wayne	Detroit	1,177,645	1,888,946	2,015,623	6.7%
2	Kent	Grand Rapids	183,041	240,511	246,338	2.4%
3	Genesee	Flint	125,668	211,641	227,944	7.7%
4	Oakland	Pontiac	90,050	211,251	254,068	20.3%
5	Saginaw	Saginaw	100,286	120,717	130,468	8.1%
6	Ingham	Lansing	81,554	116,587	130,616	12.0%
7	Jackson	Jackson	72,539	92,304	93,108	0.9%
8	Kalamazoo	Kalamazoo	71,225	91,368	100,085	9.5%
9	Calhoun	Battle Creek	72,918	87,043	94,206	8.2%
10	Muskegon	Muskegon	62,362	84,630	94,501	11.7%
11	Berrien	Benton Harbor	62,653	81,066	89,117	9.9%
12	Macomb	Warren	38,103	77,146	107,638	39.5%
13	Bay	Bay City	69,548	69,474	74,981	7.9%
14	St. Clair	Port Huron	58,009	67,563	76,222	12.8%
15	Washtenaw	Ann Arbor	49,520	65,530	80,810	23.3%
16	Ottawa	Holland	47,660	54,858	59,660	8.8%
17	Houghton	Houghton	71,930	52,851	47,631	−9.9%
18	Monroe	Monroe	37,115	52,485	58,620	11.7%
19	Lenawee	Adrian	47,767	49,849	53,110	6.5%

== Companies ==
The following is a list of major companies based in Michigan in 1935.

Company	1935 sales (millions)	1935 net earnings (millions)	Headquarters	Core business
General Motors			Detroit	Automobiles
Ford Motor Company	na	na		Automobiles
Chrysler				Automobiles
Studebaker Corp.				Automobiles
Briggs Mfg. Co.			Detroit	Automobile parts supplier
S. S. Kresge				Retail
Hudson Motor Car Co.			Detroit	Automobiles
Detroit Edison				Electric utility
Michigan Bell				Telephone utility
Kellogg's			Battle Creek	Breakfast cereal
Parke-Davis			Detroit	Pharmaceutical
REO Motor Car Co.			Lansing	Automobiles
Burroughs Adding Machine				Business machines

== Sports ==
=== Baseball ===
- 1935 Detroit Tigers season – Under player-manager Mickey Cochrane, the team won the 1935 World Series, defeating the Chicago Cubs, four games to two. First baseman Hank Greenburg led the American League with 36 home runs and 168 RBIs and was selected as the American League Most Valuable Player. Other statistical leaders on the team included second baseman Charlie Gehringer with a .330 batting average and pitcher Tommy Bridges with 21 wins and a 3.51 earned run average.
- 1935 Michigan Wolverines baseball season - Under head coach Ray Fisher, the Wolverines compiled an 11–11 record. Russell D. Oliver was the team captain.

=== American football ===
- 1935 Detroit Lions season – Under head coach Potsy Clark, the Lions compiled a 7–3–2 record, placed first in the NFL's Western Division and went on to defeat the New York Giants, 26–7, in the 1935 NFL Championship Game. The team's statistical leaders included Dutch Clark, who led the NFL with 55 points scored, and Ernie Caddel, who led the league with 621 yards from scrimmage and 6.4 yards per touch.
- 1935 Michigan State Spartans football team – The Spartans compiled a 6–2 record under head coach Charlie Bachman and won their annual rivalry game with Michigan by a 25 to 6 score.
- 1935 Detroit Titans football team – The Titans compiled a 6–3 record under head coach Gus Dorais.
- 1935 Wayne Tartars football team – The Tartars compiled a 5–2–1 record under head coach Joe Gembis and shut out four of eight opponents.
- 1935 Michigan State Normal Hurons football team – The Hurons compiled a 4–2–2 record and outscored opponents by a total of 43 to 41.
- 1935 Western State Hilltoppers football team – The Hilltoppers compiled a 5–3 record and were outscored by opponents, 91 to 78.
- 1935 Michigan Wolverines football team – The Wolverines compiled a 4–4 record under head coach Harry Kipke and finished in a tie for seventh place in the Big Ten Conference.
- 1935 Central State Bearcats football team – The Bearcats compiled a 1–6 record and were outscored by a total of 101 to 32.

=== Basketball ===
- 1934–35 Detroit Titans men's basketball team –
- 1934–35 Michigan Wolverines men's basketball team –

=== Ice hockey ===
- 1934–35 Detroit Red Wings season – Under general manager and coach Jack Adams, the Red Wings compiled a 19–22–7 record.
- 1934–35 Michigan Wolverines men's ice hockey team –

=== Boat racing ===
- APBA Gold Cup –
- Harmsworth Cup –
- Port Huron to Mackinac Boat Race –

=== Boxing ===
- Detroit's Joe Louis won 11 consecutive bouts in 1935, including a technical knockout of Primo Carnera on June 25 at Yankee Stadium and a knockout of Max Baer on September 24 at Yankee Stadium.

=== Golfing ===
- Motor City Open -
- Michigan Open -

== Births ==
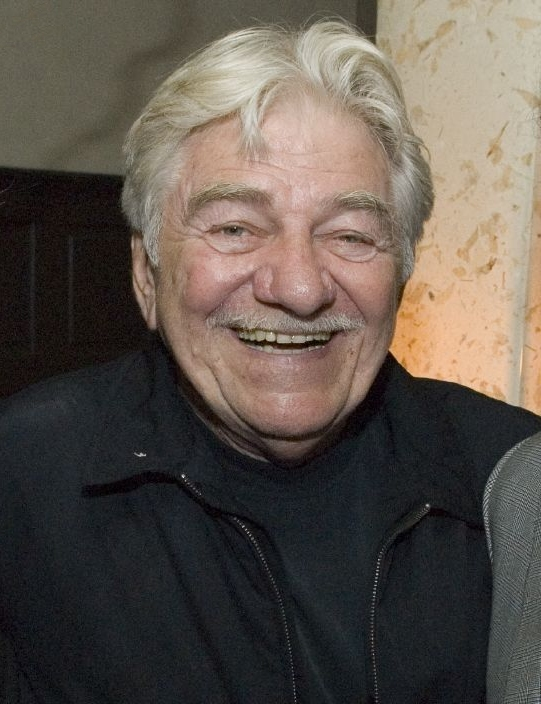
Oscar nominee Seymour Cassel

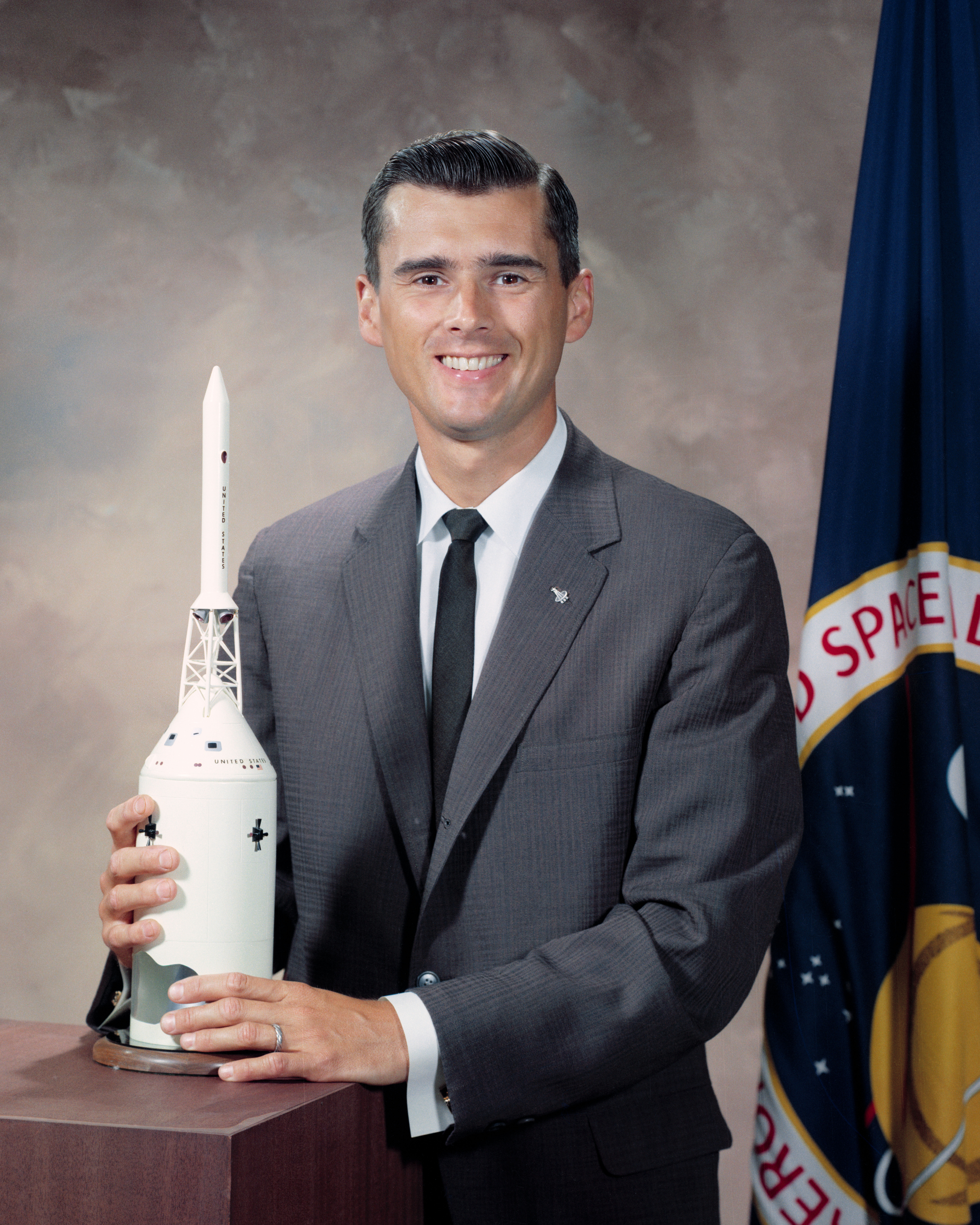
Astronaut Roger B. Chaffee

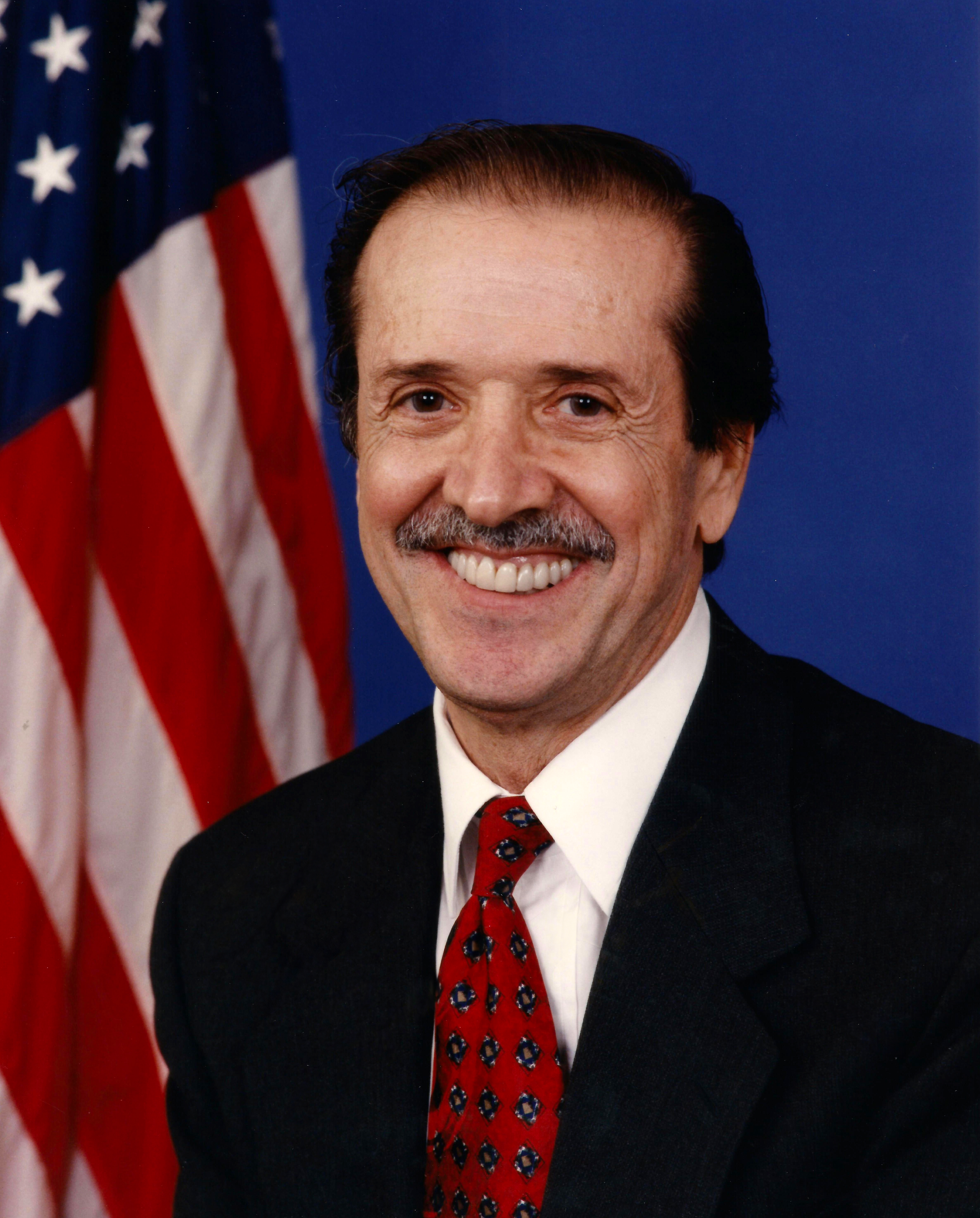
Sonny Bono

- January 21 - Carol Wald, artist and illustrator known for her collages and paintings, in Detroit
- January 22 - Seymour Cassel, actor (Oscar nominee for Faces), in Detroit
- February 8 - Council Cargle, stage and film actor (Detroit 9000, Jackie Brown), in Detroit
- February 15 - Roger B. Chaffee, astronaut who died in a fire during a pre-launch test for the Apollo 1 mission, in Grand Rapids
- February 16 - Sonny Bono, part of the singing duo Sonny & Cher, producer, and politician, in Detroit
- February 17 - Bill Van Tichelt, developer of VanTech Motorcycles, in Kalamazoo
- March 11 - Nancy Kovack, actress and wife of Zubin Mehta, in Flint
- March 12 - Hugh Lawson, jazz pianist, in Detroit
- March 13 - Leon Burton, American football player for Arizona State who in 1957 led the NCAA in rushing yards (1,126 yards) and scoring (96 points), in Flint
- March 13 - Joan LeQuia, pitcher and infielder in the All-American Girls Professional Baseball League, in Negaunee, Michigan
- March 20 - Bettye Washington Greene, first African-American Ph.D. chemist to work as a professional at Dow Chemical, in Midland
- March 29 - Moby Benedict, coach of Michigan Wolverines baseball team from 1963 to 1979, in Detroit
- April 12 - Lee H. Katzin, television and film director and creator of Man from Atlantis, in Detroit
- April 13 - Michael Joseph Kaniecki, Roman Catholic Bishop of Fairbanks from 1985-2000, in Detroit
- April 19 - Hans W. Becherer, president and CEO of John Deere from 1987-2000, in Detroit
- May 18 - Ken Hamlin, Major League Baseball infielder (1957-1966), in Detroit
- May 24 - Ronald Edmonds, educator, author, and pioneer of effective schools research, in Ypsilanti
- June 17 - Rudolph G. Wilson, a.k.a. "Papa Rudy", professor, writer, storyteller, and public speaker, in Detroit
- June 19 - Sarah Goddard Power, Democratic Party activist and University of Michigan Regent, in Detroit
- June 26 - Hank Greenwald, play-by-play announcer for the San Francisco Giants from 1979 to 1996, in Detroit
- June 27 - Dan Currie, linebacker in the NFL from 1958 to 1966 (2× NFL champion), in Detroit
- July 29 - Joan Gerber, voice actress (H.R. Pufnstuf, Teenage Mutant Ninja Turtles), in Detroit
- July 31 - Theodore Weesner, author/novelist, works including The Car Thief (1972), in Flint
- August 14 - Gary Tobian, gold medal winner in springboard diving competition in 1960 Olympics, in Detroit
- August 15 - Tom Morey, a.k.a. "Y", musician, engineer, shaper, surfer, and surf equipment designer, in Detroit
- August 20 - Stephen Yokich, labor union activist and UAW president from 1994 to 2002, in Detroit
- August 26 - Shirley E. Schwartz, chemist and research scientist for General Motors, in Detroit
- September 10 - Sammy Sessions, driver USAC Championship Car series from 1965 to 1975, in Nashville, Michigan
- October 12 - Paul Humphrey, jazz and funk/R&B drummer, in Detroit
- October 13 - Etterlene DeBarge, gospel singer and matriarch of the musical group DeBarge, in Royal Oak
- October 13 - Edgar Culbertson, recipient of Coast Guard Medal for heroism leading to his death in 1967, in Ferndale
- October 28 - Thomas J. Schriber, technology professor known for his work on "Simulation using General Purpose Simulation System", in Flint
- December 4 - Robert Vesco, fugitive criminal financier, in Detroit
- December 21 - Kurt Seiffert, gold medal winner in coxed pair rowing at 1956 Olympics, in Detroit
- December 26 - Abdul Fakir, singer and founding member of Motown's the Four Tops, in Detroit

=== Gallery of 1935 births ===
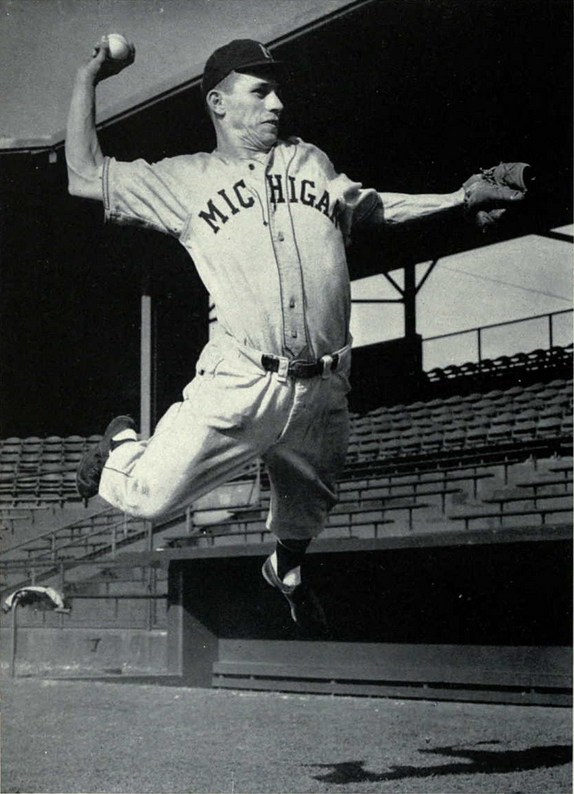
Moby Benedict

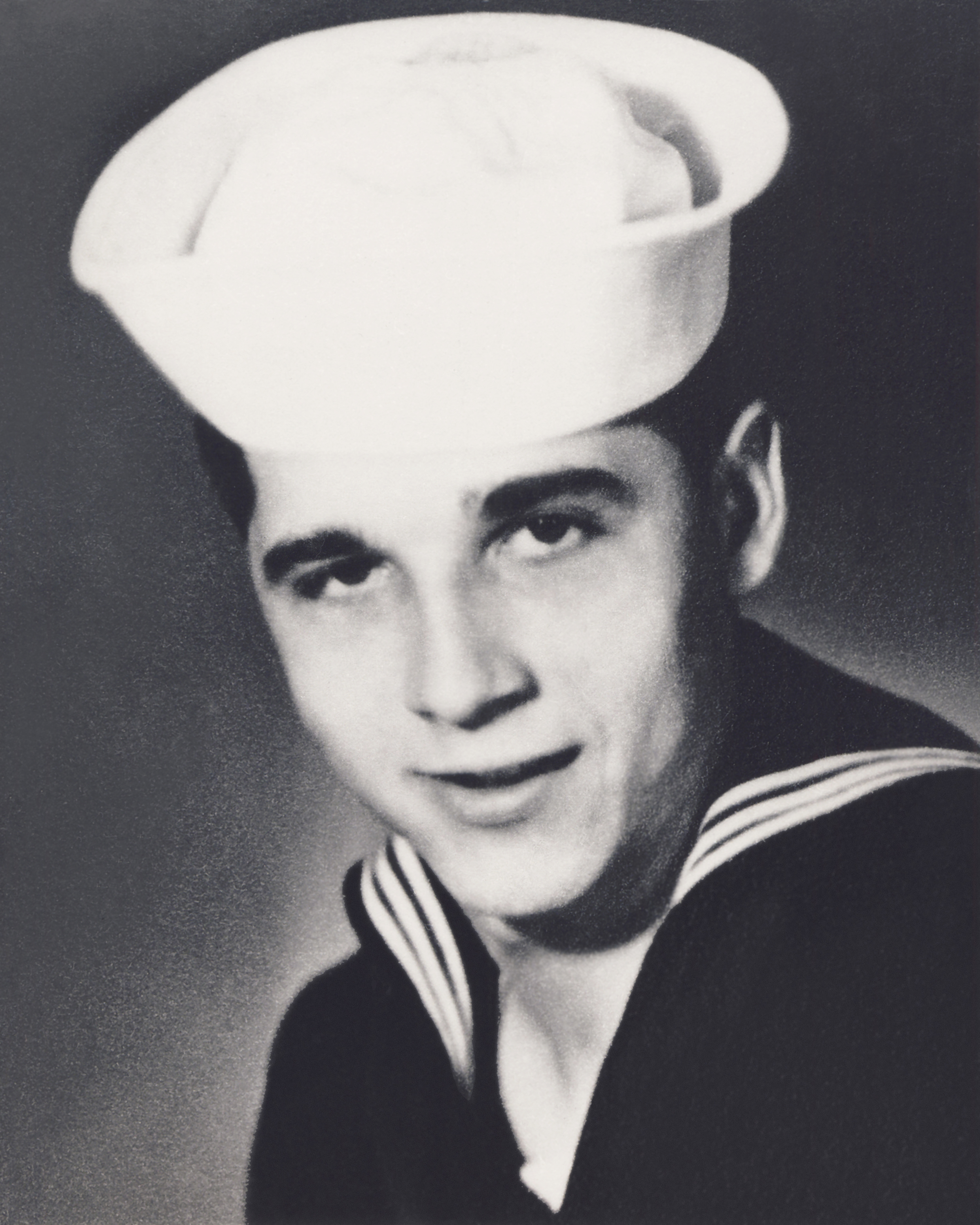
Edgar Culbertson

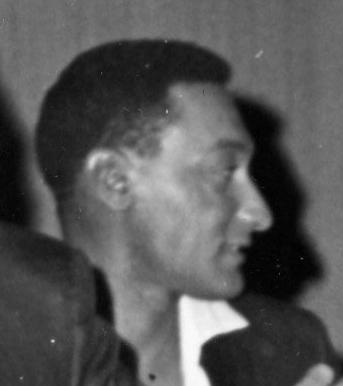
Abdul Fakir

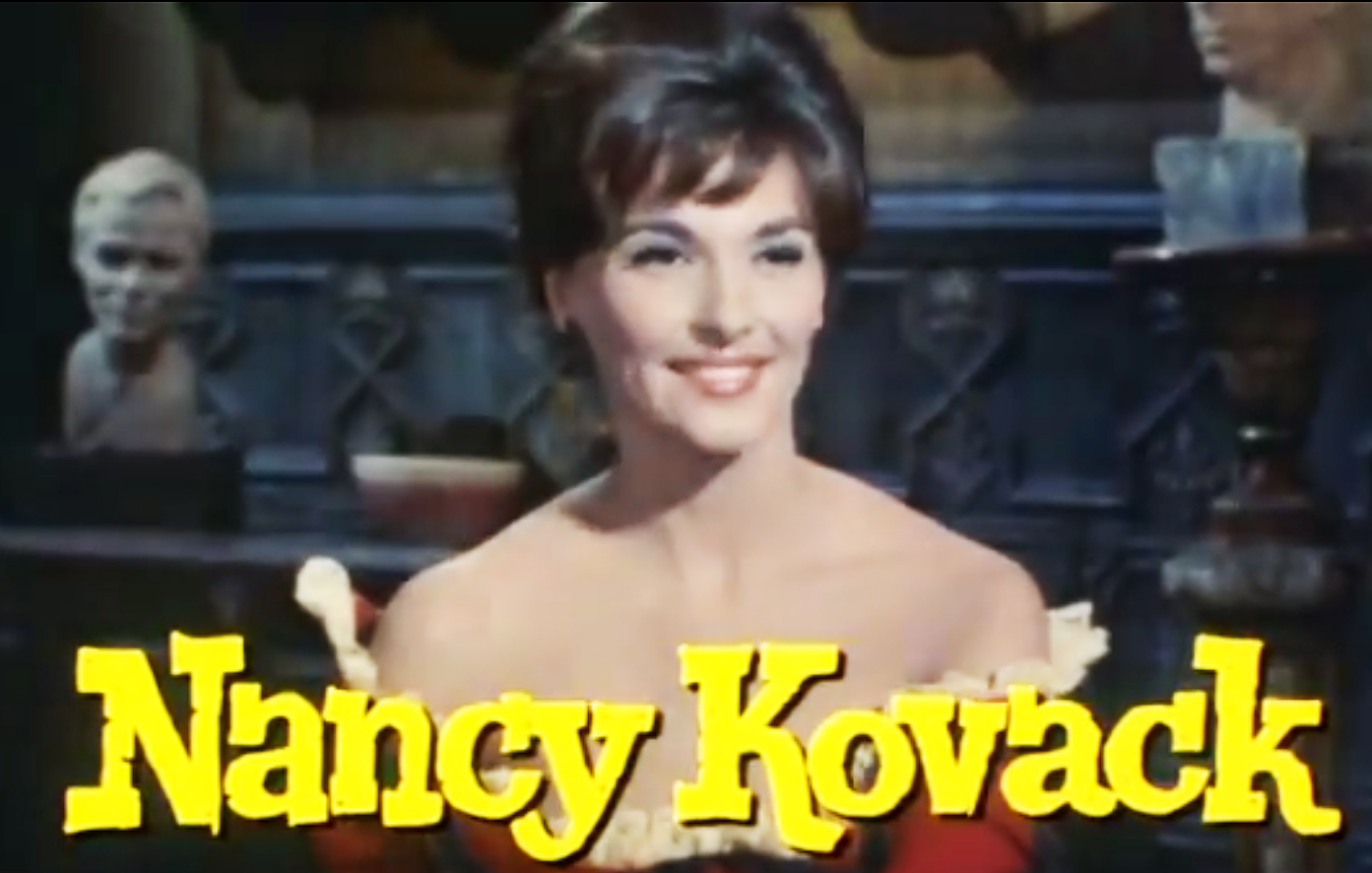
Nancy Kovack

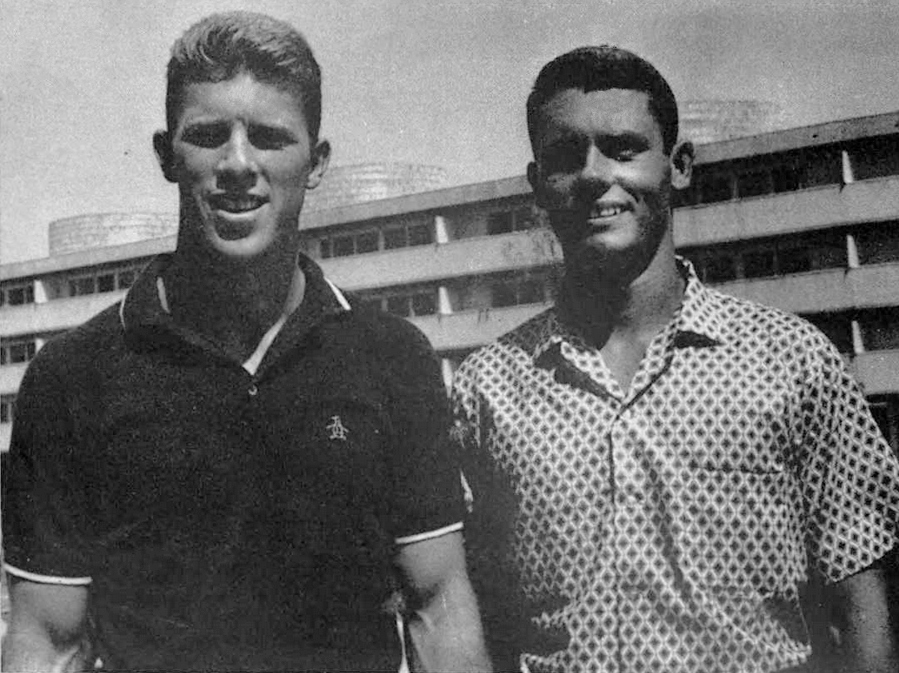
Gary Tobian (left)

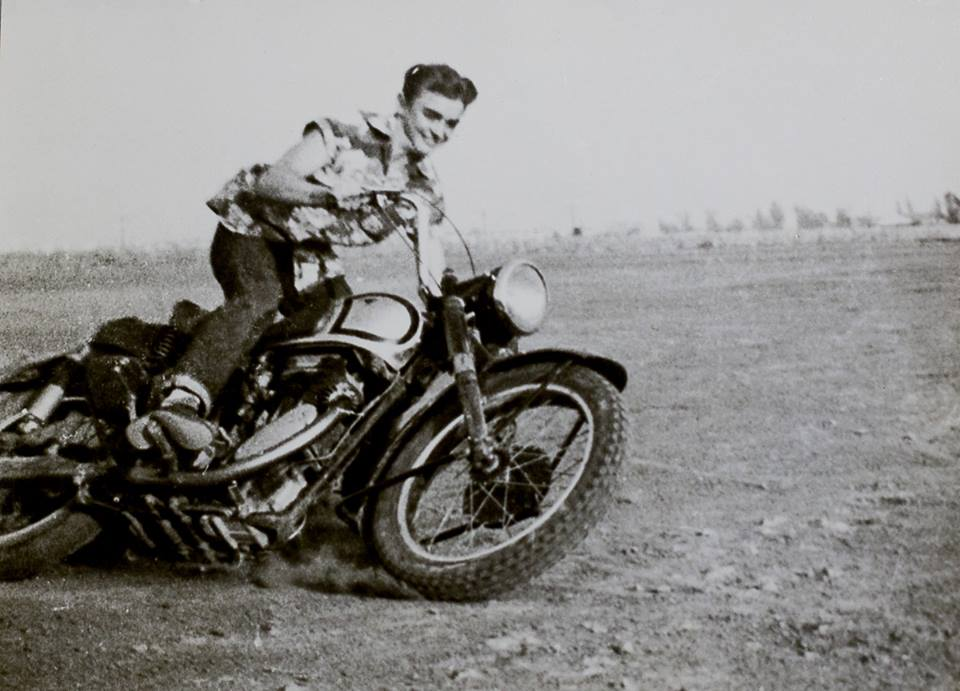
Bill Van Tichelt

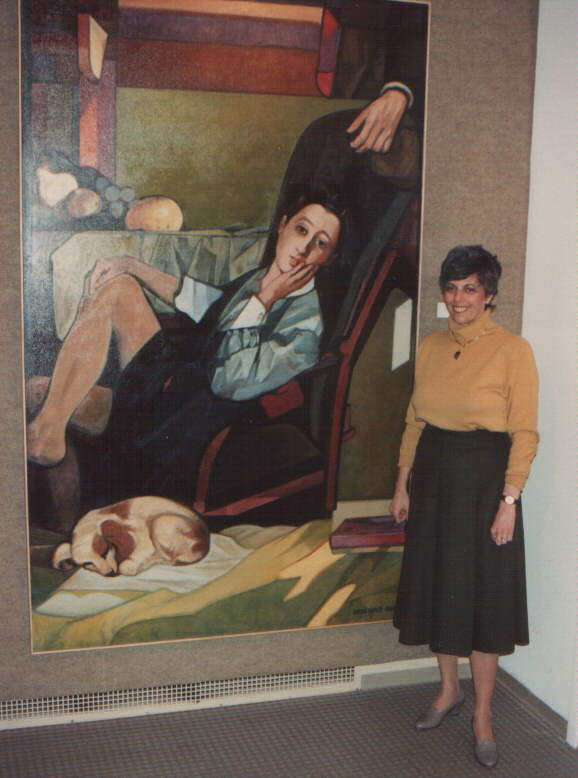
Carol Wald

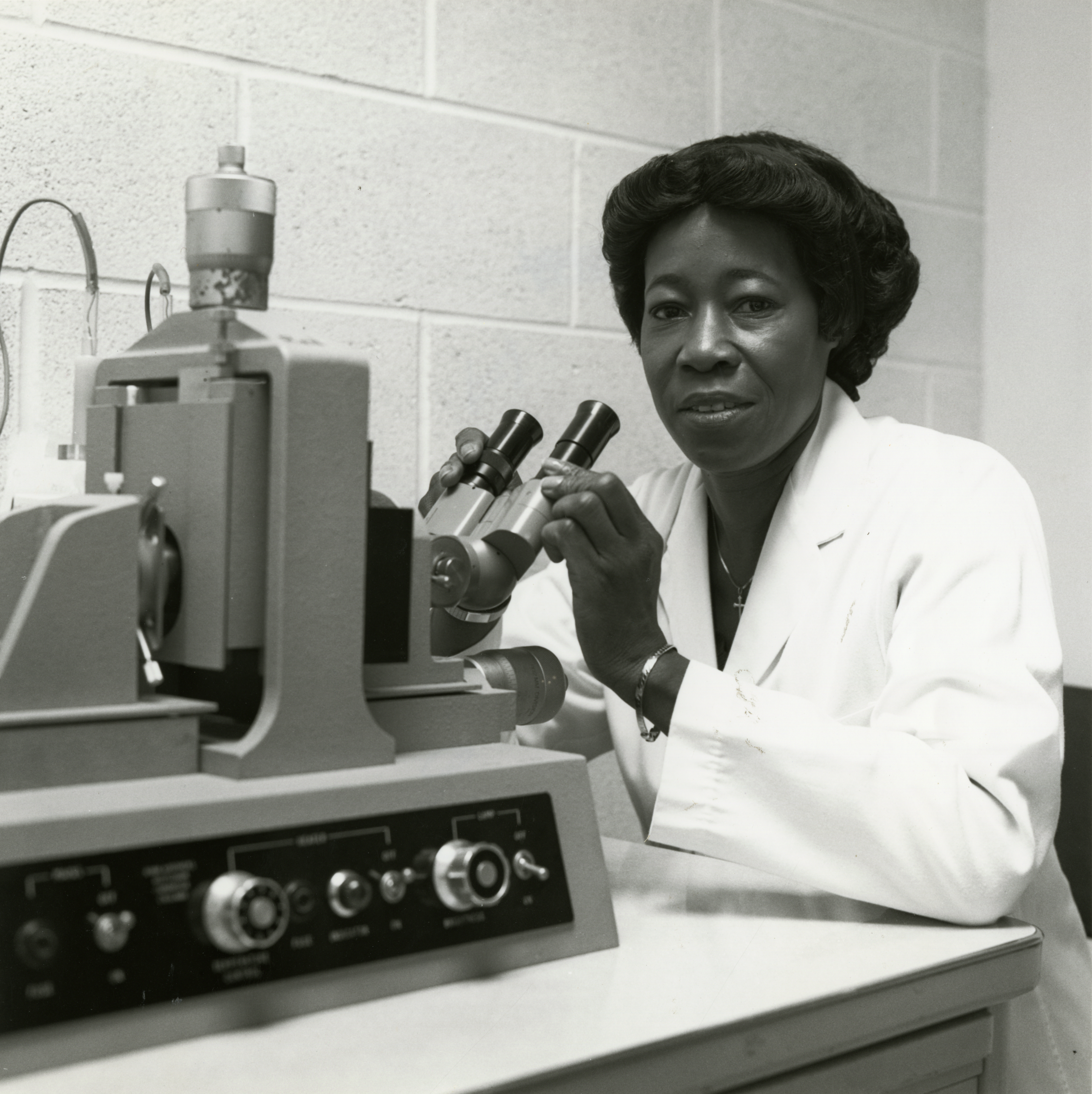
Bettye Washington Greene

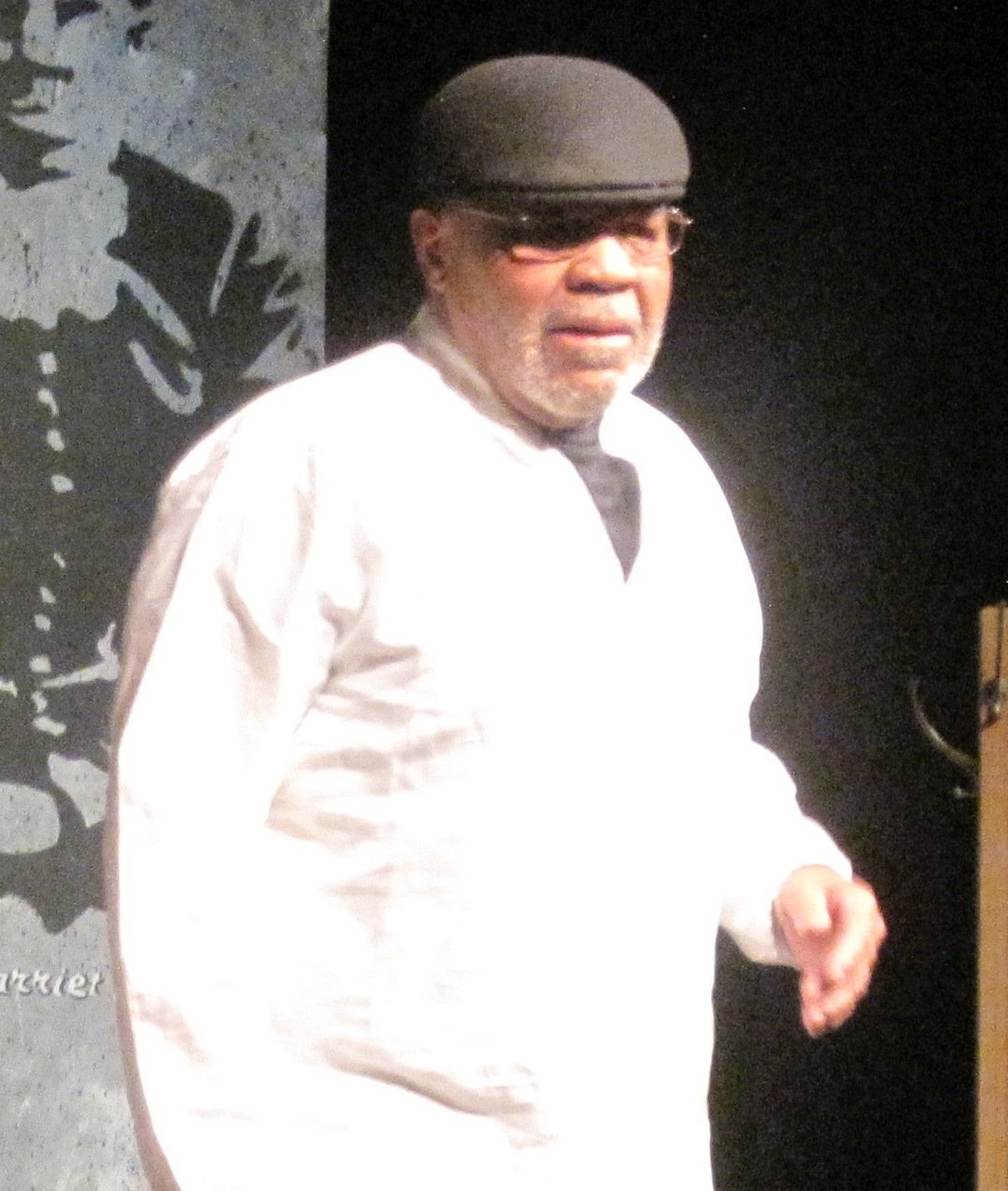
Rudolph G. Wilson

== Deaths ==
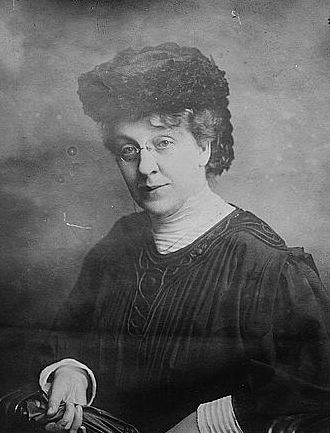
Caroline Bartlett Crane

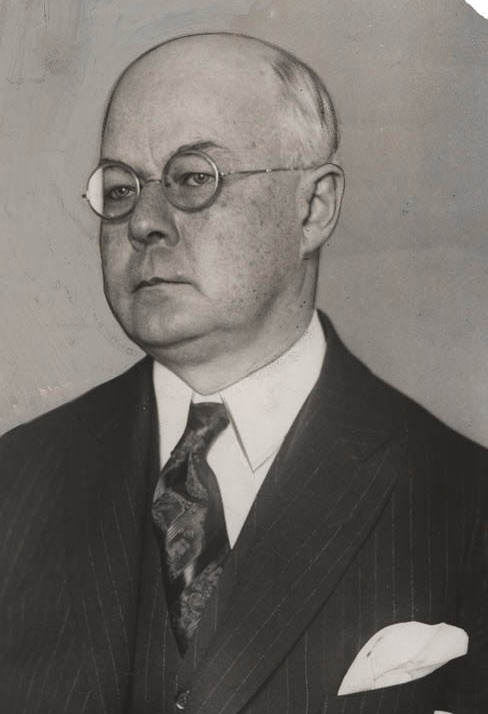
Frank Navin

- January 5 - Frank S. Kedzie, President of Michigan Agricultural College (1915–1921), at age 77
- January 31 - Harry Tuthill, athletic trainer for boxers and sporting teams, including the New York Giants (1904-1907), Detroit Tigers (1907-1921), and Michigan Wolverines football (1916-1917), at age 65 in Detroit
- February 2 - Clara Smith, blues singer, in Detroit
- February 19 - Zelda Sears, actress, screenwriter (The Divorcee), novelist and businesswoman, at age 62 in Hollywood, California
- March 24 - Caroline Bartlett Crane, Unitarian minister, suffragist, civic reformer, educator and journalist, known as "America's housekeeper" for her efforts to improve urban sanitation, at age 76 in Kalamazoo
- April 2 - Edwin F. Sweet, U.S. Congressman (1911-1913), Assistant Secretary of Commerce (1913-1921), at age 86 in Ojai, California
- April 29 - William J. Olcott, iron mining and railroad executive who was captain of the University of Michigan football teams in 1882 and 1883, at age 73 in Pasadena, California
- May 21 - Sarah Killgore Wertman, first woman law student at the University of Michigan and the first woman to be admitted to the Bar of any state in the United States, at age 72 in Seattle
- October 19 - Henry M. Kimball, U.S. Congressman from Michigan's Third District, in Kalamazoo
- November 13 - Frank Navin, principal owner of the Detroit Tigers for 27 years, in Detroit
- December 25 - Horatio Earle, Michigan's first Highway Commissioner and a leader of the good roads movement, at age 80 in Detroit

== See also ==
- History of Michigan
- History of Detroit
