= Van Tichelt =

Van Tichelt is a surname. Notable people with the surname include:

- Bill Van Tichelt (born 1935), American businessman
- Dirk Van Tichelt (born 1984), Belgian judoka
