= Willetta Greene-Johnson =

American physicist

- Born: March 1, 1957 (age 69); Delaware, United States
- Education: University of Chicago; Stanford University
- Parent(s): Bettye Washington Greene; William M. Greene
- Scientific career
- Fields: Phase interactions
- Workplaces: Loyola University Chicago
- Thesis: The effects of the exchange mode dynamics on vibrational phase relaxation at surfaces

Willetta Greene-Johnson (born 1957) is a senior lecturer in the physics and chemistry departments at Loyola University Chicago. She was one of the first African-American women to complete a Ph.D. degree in theoretical physics. Greene-Johnson is also a Grammy award winning musician for her song "Saved" (2004).

== Early life and education ==
Willetta Greene-Johnson was born in Delaware in 1957 and raised in Michigan, surrounded by music and science. Greene's parents were both scientists—her mother, Bettye Washington Greene, was one of the first African-American women to receive a PhD in chemistry and her father, William Miller Greene, was an engineer and former captain in the U.S. Airforce who was trained just a decade after the Tuskegee Airmen. Greene-Johnson's parents exposed her to a wide range of music, including Ella Fitzgerald, Barbra Streisand and The Beatles. One of her earliest memories about her attraction toward orchestral and gospel music started with a performance of Symphony No. 5 (Beethoven).

Greene-Johnson's parents encouraged her to pursue a career in science. She began her undergraduate career as a pre-med major but later studied physics at Stanford University, graduating in 1979 with distinction. In 1979 she joined the AT&T Cooperative Research Fellowship Program (CRFP). As part of the program, she spent a summer working at AT&T's labs. She then pursued her doctoral degree and was one of the first African-American women to complete a PhD in theoretical physics, which she earned in 1988 at the University of Chicago. Her doctoral research focused on the dynamics of vibrational phase relaxation at surfaces.

== Career ==
=== Research ===
After her PhD, Greene-Johnson became a Ford Fellow in the department of physics at Loyola University Chicago, where she worked on surface optico-physical interactions. She joined the faculty of Loyola University Chicago in 1992. She has been Master Teacher of chemistry and physics since 2005. She teaches courses in general chemistry, college physics, quantum mechanics and biophysics. She was a keynote speaker at the 2014 Conference for Undergraduate Women in Physics.

=== Music ===
Her 2004 song, "Saved", is featured on a Grammy Award winning Brooklyn Tabernacle CD project. The song reflects on the meaning of life. It was translated into four languages and distributed worldwide. In 2010, she was named as a Woman of Excellence for her achievements in music. She plays with the Chicago Sinfonietta and has conducted in their annual Martin Luther King concert. As a professor at Loyola University Chicago, Greene-Johnson uses the summer to balance researching physics topics as well as composing and recording music. She has performed with the Memphis Symphony Orchestra. Throughout her career, she has preached and written about biblical topics and founded StrategicMusic, Inc. in 2003.
