= The Car Thief =

1972 novel by Theodore Weesner

- Author: Theodore Weesner
- Language: English
- Publisher: Random House
- Publication date: June 1972
- Publication place: United States
- Media type: Print (hardcover)
- ISBN: 978-0394462783
- Followed by: A German Affair

The Car Thief is the 1972 debut novel by Theodore Weesner. It was excerpted in The Atlantic Monthly, The New Yorker, and Esquire. The Car Thief is about a juvenile delinquent living in Flint, Michigan, in 1959.

It was reprinted in 1987 by Vintage Contemporaries, among the first books picked by the imprint.

== Critical reception ==
The novel received ecstatic reviews. Kirkus Reviews wrote that it was "a splinter-sharp and wincingly realistic first novel which encroaches steadily on the reader before it shafts him altogether." The New York Times gave it a rave, calling a scene near the end of the book "one of the most profoundly powerful in American fiction."

== Awards and recognition ==
The Car Thief won the Great Lakes Colleges Association's New Writers Award. The University of Iowa's Books for Young Adults Program recommended the book, noting that "even though the book is long, it is being read by some students who typically read very little."
