= Thomas J. Schriber =

American academic (1935–2024)

Thomas Jude Schriber (October 28, 1935 – December 31, 2024) was an American academic, Professor Emeritus of Technology and Operations at the University of Michigan Ross School of Business, and a pioneer in computer simulation education. He was particularly known for his groundbreaking work on "Simulation using General Purpose Simulation System (GPSS)" and his contributions to business technology education that shaped generations of leaders in the field.

== Biography ==
Born in Flint, Michigan, Schriber obtained his MS at the University of Notre Dame in 1957, and then moved to the University of Michigan, where he obtained in MSE in 1958, his MA in 1959, and his PhD in 1964.

Schriber lived in Ann Arbor, Michigan with his wife Ann Schriber. They were married in 1967 and had three kids.

Schriber died on December 31, 2024, at the age of 89.

== Work ==
Schriber's teaching career started at Eastern Michigan University in 1963 as Assistant Professor and Director of its Academic Computer Center. In 1966, he joined the Business School at the University of Michigan, where he spent five decades shaping minds and advancing simulation science. Rising through the ranks, he became Assistant Professor in 1966, Associate Professor in 1969, and Professor of Business Information Technology in 1972. His expertise took him around the world as a Visiting Scholar at Stanford University in 1972–73, ETH Zurich in 1987, and the National University of Singapore in 1995.

Schriber's research interests were in the field of "discrete-event simulation, which is a methodology for building computer-based models of systems and then conducting experiments with the models to make inferences about the behavior of the systems being modeled."

According to Schriber (2014):

Simulation encompasses a broad set of activities, including

- the design and implementation of modeling languages;
- the verification and validation of models;
- the visualization of systems through the animation of models;
- the analysis of input (data) to simulation models;
- statistical design of experiments;
- statistical analysis of output;
- the education of simulation modelers and simulation consumers; and
- the effective “selling” of simulation results to high-level decision makers.

Within this broad arena, some of my activities include or have included: the logical foundations of simulation software; the implementation of variance-reduction techniques in the design of models; simulation applications in the design and control of manufacturing and transportation systems; automation of output analysis; automatic model generation; the writing of simulation textbooks; and the use of Web-based tools in simulation education.

Simulation can be used "to design complex systems that are not amenable to mathematical analysis, such as manufacturing systems, logistics systems, and information systems."

== Awards and recognition ==
Schriber was awarded by INFORMS the Simulation Society’s Distinguished Service Award, and its Lifetime Professional Achievement Award.

== Legacy ==
Schriber's work in discrete-event simulation and his textbooks on GPSS became fundamental resources in business technology education. His methodologies for computer-based modeling systems continue to influence how complex systems are designed and analyzed in manufacturing, logistics, and information systems.

== Selected publications ==
- Schriber, Thomas J. Fundamentals of flowcharting. (1969).
- McMillan, Claude, and Richard F. Gonzalez. Systems analysis: a computer approach to decision models. Richard D. Irwin, 1973.
- Schriber, Thomas J. Simulation using GPSS. Michigan Univ. Ann Arbor, 1974.

Articles, a selection:

- Schriber, Thomas J. "Introduction to simulation." Proceedings of the 9th conference on Winter simulation-Volume 1. Winter Simulation Conference, 1977.
- Schriber, Thomas J., Daniel T. Brunner, and Jeffrey S. Smith. "Inside discrete-event simulation software: how it works and why it matters." Proceedings of the 2013 Winter Simulation Conference: Simulation: Making Decisions in a Complex World. IEEE Press, 2013.
