= Rudolph G. Wilson =

American academic (1935–2017)

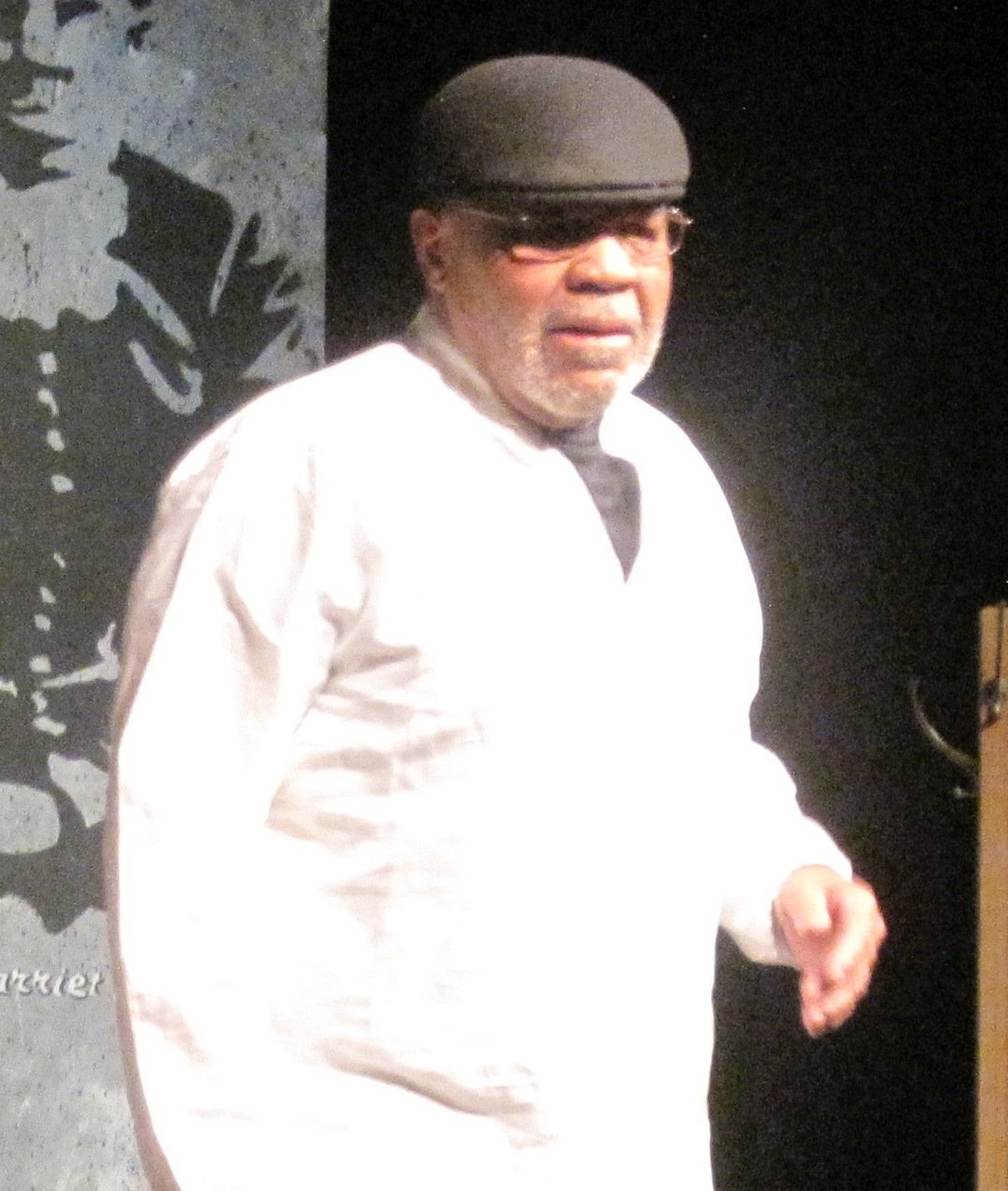
- Rudolph Wilson on the stage at the Metcalf Theatre at Southern Illinois University Edwardsville in 2010.
- Born: June 17, 1935; Detroit, Michigan, United States
- Died: December 4, 2017 (aged 82); Edwardsville, Illinois
- Education: Los Angeles State College, Washington University in St. Louis, University of California at Los Angeles, Stanford University, Claremont Graduate University
- Occupations: Professor, writer.
- Spouse: Sandrah Lavernn Wilson

Rudolph G. Wilson (June 17, 1935 – December 4, 2017) was an American professor, writer, storyteller, and public speaker, known by his students as Papa Rudy. He was the first African-American member, and later the first elected black president, of the Edwardsville School Board. At Claremont Graduate School in 1965, he was the first African American to teach in an all-white school. He was, until retirement in 2009, the assistant provost for Cultural and Social Diversity at Southern Illinois University Edwardsville, as well as holding the academic rank of associate professor of secondary education in the department of curriculum and instruction.

== Life and teaching career ==
Wilson was born in Detroit, Michigan, according to his birth certificate. He graduated in the top ten from River Rouge High School, Michigan, in 1953.

He attended UCLA for three years from 1953 to 1955, then went into the army from 1955 to 1958. He returned to Los Angeles State College to complete his undergraduate degree in English. He then went to Claremont Graduate University for his master's degree and later pursued other graduate studies at Washington University in St. Louis, at the University of California at Los Angeles, and at Stanford University.

He returned to Claremont in 1965 to teach English at Claremont High School, on invitation of a colleague, Dean Wiley, who was appointed president of the School of Education. Wilson was the first African American to teach in the all-white school.

On June 17, 1969, he resumed at Southern Illinois University Edwardsville. Not long after, he became the assistant provost for Cultural and Social Diversity and a professor in the School of Education. He worked there until 2009 as Assistant Provost for Cultural and Social Diversity and a professor in School of Education.

== Racial discrimination at Granite City ==
As part of the School of Education in SIUE in the early seventies, Wilson's work required him to look after student teachers and visit different high schools to shadow and mentor them. However, "when Wilson walked in to Granite City High School one day, it was made very clear to him that he was not wanted simply for the color of his skin." He went to supervise student teachers at Granite City, and it was not acceptable to the school. And so when he went back to the university. The university then decided not to send student teachers to Granite City until they accepted whoever SIUE sends, regardless of race. The impasse lasted for over a decade, until 1991 when Mr. Randy Burgess, broke Granite City's unwritten policy concerning student teachers.

In an article in the Granite High World published on March 1, 2017, the editor, Mona Zubi, apologized to Wilson for the way he was treated by the city and encouraged readers to "reflect upon stories such as Rudy's and millions of other marginalized people and ultimately learn from our past.

== Storyteller ==
Wilson was a storyteller. He performed "one-man shows" as well as extensive role-play improvisations about characters in African-American history. He also volunteered "for story hours at local children's libraries" and worked as a docent at the Col. Benjamin Stevenson in Edwardsville. He also "told stories about the importance of education and appreciation of diversity at SIUE."

== Retirement ==
He retired from SIUE in 2009. In 2010, several educators, colleagues, and students gathered to honor him. A Festschrift, edited by Michael Oladejo Afolayan, titled Multiculturalism in the Age of the Mosaic: Essays in Honor of Rudolph G. Wilson (Nova Publishing) was written in his honor. Several scholars, friends and family members from around the world contributed chapters in the book.

== Reputation and family life ==
Wilson was married to his wife, Sandra LaVernne King Wilson, for many years. They have lived in Edwardsville, Illinois since about 1970. They are parents of four children, two sons and two daughters.

He was also very well travelled, adopting students and scholars from all over the world, including Nigerian poet Remi Raji who described him as a "patron and father... The American who was a true African".

After retirement, he served as chairman of a state-appointed financial oversight panel for the Venice, Illinois school district after its school board was removed from office by the state of Illinois. Under Wilson's leadership, the troubled school's finances were resolved and the school district became solvent and functional again. Venice minutes, 6.28.2012

== Awards ==
Wilson, in his life, received many honors and awards, including SIUE's Teaching Excellence Award, the Martin Luther King, Jr. Humanitarian Award, The Hudlin Award for Humanistic Teaching, the Great Teacher Award, The Kimmel Leadership Center Award for Faculty who contributes greatly to the community. He has been named the Educator of the Year by the St. Louis American, a local newspaper, and by The Rotary Foundation as a Paul Harris Fellow, given "to individuals who further understanding and friendly relations between peoples of the world."

== Death ==
Wilson died at the Eden Village Care Center, Glen Carbon, Illinois, on December 4, 2017.
