= Theodore Weesner =

American author

Theodore Weesner (July 31, 1935 – June 25, 2015) was an American author. Born in Flint, Michigan, he is best known for his coming-of-age debut novel, The Car Thief (1972). The book, published by Random House, is in 439 libraries, according to WorldCat

He also wrote The True Detective (1987), Novemberfest (1994), Harbor Lights (2000), and other novels and short stories.

== Published works ==
Novels

- The Car Thief (1972)
- A German Affair (1976)
- The True Detective (1987)
- Winning the City (1990)
- Novemberfest (1994)
- Harbor Lights (2000)
- Carrying (2015)

Story collections

- Children's Hearts (1992)
