= Carol Wald =

American artist (1935–2000)

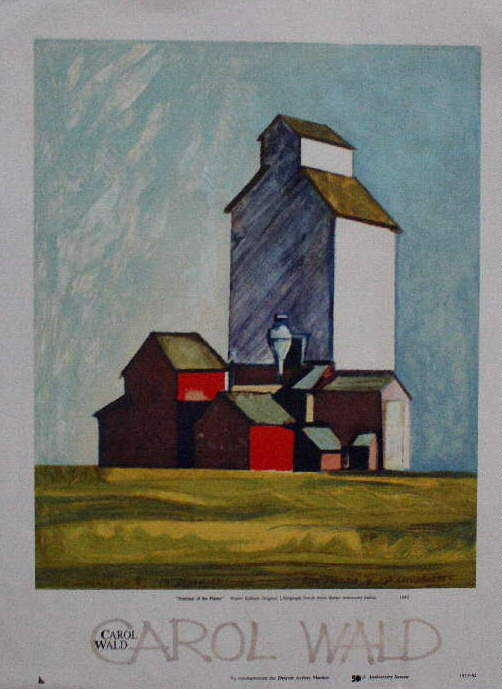
Carol Wald's 1982 poster for the 50th anniversary of the Detroit Artists Market

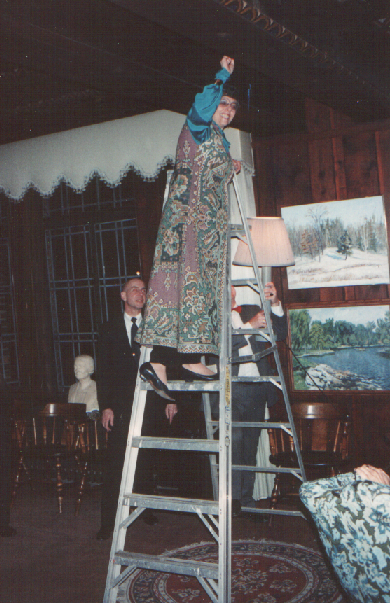
Carol Wald signs the beam at the Scarab Club in Detroit.

Carol S. Wald (/wɔːld/; January 21, 1935 – September 8, 2000) was an American artist who was also widely known for her talents as an illustrator. Her collages and paintings appeared in Time, Fortune, and Ms, and on the covers of Business Week, the New York Times Sunday Magazine, and Saturday Review.

== Biography ==
Carol Wald was born in Detroit, Michigan, where she began studying art at age twelve. At age sixteen, while still a student at Detroit's Cass Technical High School, her talent was recognized by mayor Albert Cobo, and in 1954 she was awarded a four-year scholarship at the Art School of the Society of Arts and Crafts in Detroit. In 1960, the Detroit Institute of Arts purchased one of her paintings, "Children On Stilts". In 1963, she studied under Ben Shahn at the Skowhegan School of Painting and Sculpture, Skowhegan, Maine, and in 1967 she studied at the Cranbrook Educational Community in Bloomfield Hills, Michigan. In 1964 she was given a ten-year retrospective exhibition at the Flint Institute of Arts in Flint, Michigan.

By 1970 the National Gallery of Art and the Minnesota Museum of American Art had each purchased paintings by her for their permanent collections. She left Detroit for New York City in 1971, where she emerged as one of the nation's top illustrators. In 1975 she was awarded a gold medal for editorial illustration from the Society of Illustrators in New York. In 1976, she was commissioned by the Ford administration to paint America's official Bicentennial painting, which is on display at Grand Valley State University in Grand Rapids. She prepared the covers and chapter opening artwork for Ben Shneiderman's books: Software Psychology (1980) and Designing the User Interface (1986).

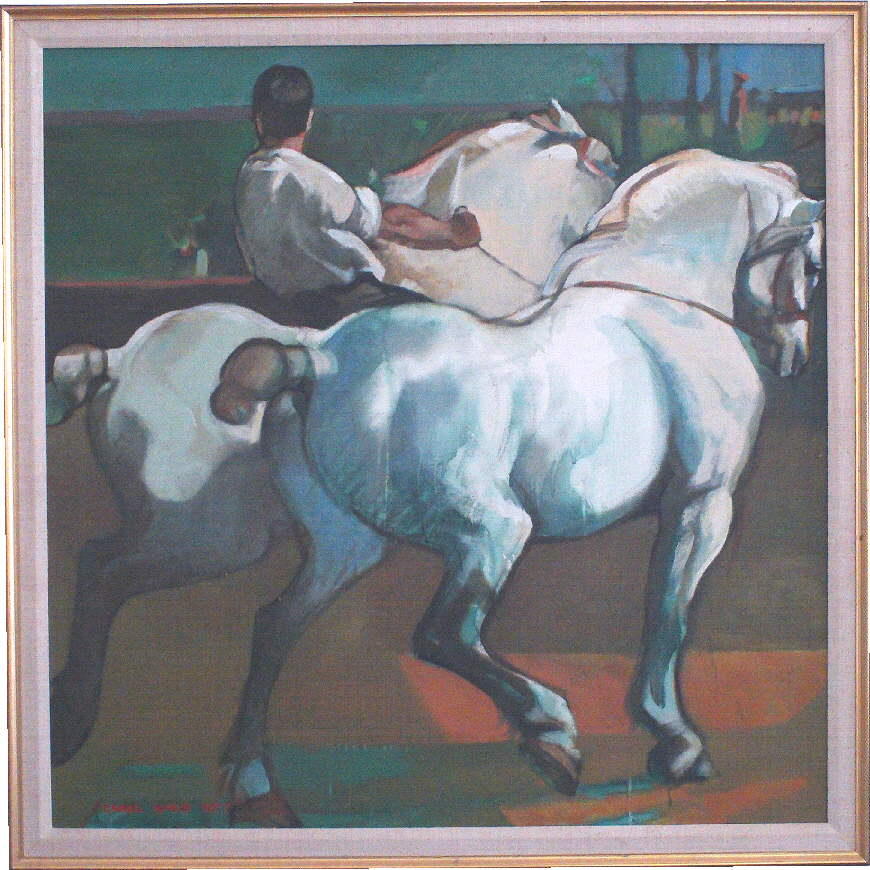
Exercising the Mares, 1977, from a private collection

In the 1980s, a class reunion organizer for Cass Tech put her in touch with fellow alumnus, the filmmaker Hermann Tauchert. They had actually met in high school 25 years earlier, when they dated each other's friends. Romance bloomed and for two or three years, they conducted a long-distance love affair, with Tauchert in Detroit and Wald in New York. But finally in 1986, Wald moved back to Detroit and they married.

In 1990, worried about the high levels of crime in Detroit, they moved to Burlington, Ontario.

In 1997, Wald was diagnosed with cancer; three years later, she died in the Ian Anderson House, Oakville, on September 8, 2000.

The Cranbrook Academy of Art, located just outside Detroit, will be the repository of Wald's collections and writings.

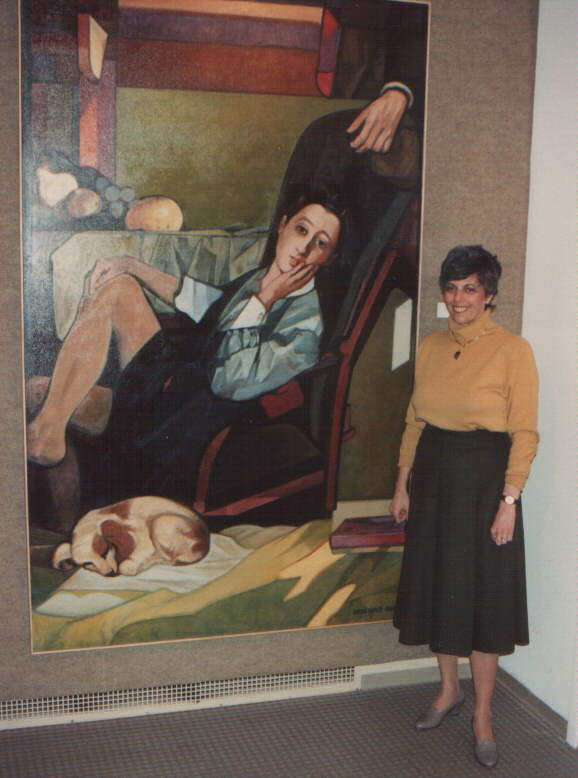
Carol Wald at an art show, with "The Dream," 1989

== Works held in permanent collections ==
- The National Museum of American Art, Smithsonian Institution, Washington, DC
- The Detroit Institute of Arts, Detroit, Michigan
- Dennos Museum Center at Northwestern Michigan College, Traverse City, Michigan
- The Minneapolis Museum of Art, St. Paul, MN
- Utah Museum of Fine Arts at Utah University, Salt Lake City, UT
- The Museum of American Illustration, New York, NY
- Newport Performing Arts Center, Newport, OR
- Grand Valley State University, John C. Kennedy Hall of Engineering, Grand Rapids, MI

== Bibliography ==
- Myth America: Picturing Women, 1865-1945 (New York: Pantheon Books, 1975).
- Carol Wald: Sequences and Transformations (Youngstown, Ohio: Butler Institute of American Art, 1992).
