= Bettye Washington Greene =

American chemist

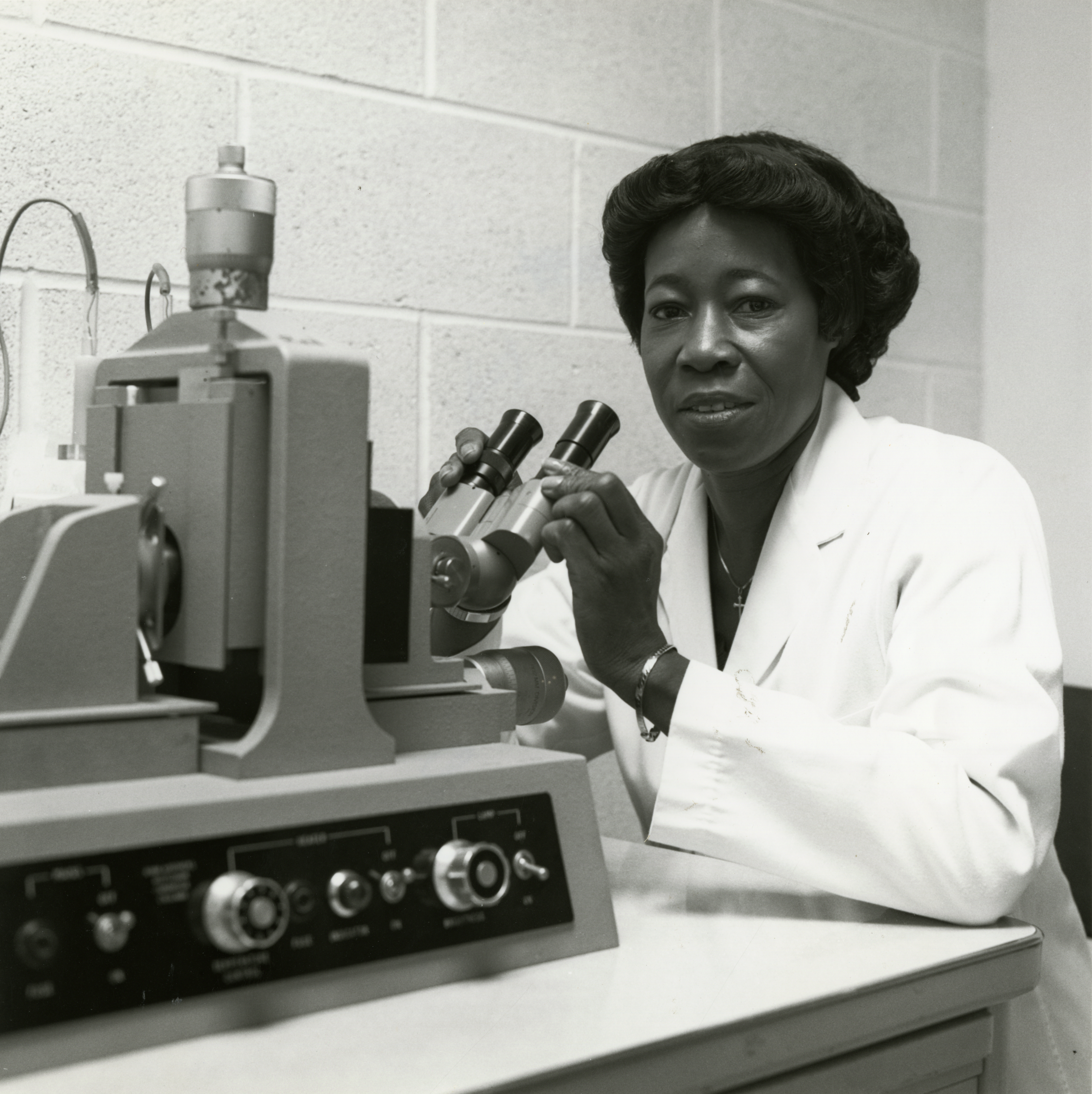
- Born: March 20, 1935; Palestine, Texas, United States
- Died: June 16, 1995 (aged 60); Midland, Michigan, U.S.
- Other names: Bettye Greene, Bettye Washington
- Education: Tuskegee Institute, Wayne State University
- Spouse: William M. Greene
- Children: Willetta Greene Johnson, Victor M. Greene; Lisa Kianne Greene
- Parent(s): Kian Criss; George Washington
- Scientific career
- Fields: Physical chemistry
- Workplaces: Dow Chemical

Bettye Washington Greene (March 20, 1935 – June 16, 1995) was an American industrial research chemist. She was one of the first few African American women to earn her Ph.D. in chemistry and she was the first African American female Ph.D. chemist to work in a professional position at the Dow Chemical Company. At Dow, she researched latex and polymers. Greene is considered an early African American pioneer in science.

== Early life ==
Bettye Washington was born to George Washington and Kian Criss in Palestine, Texas, where she attended Our Lady of Mercy Elementary School and James E. Guinn Junior High School. She attended segregated public schools and graduated from I.M. Terrell High School around 1952.

== Education ==
She entered Tuskegee Institute in Alabama, graduating with a B.S. in chemistry in 1955. She attended Wayne State University in Detroit, Michigan, where she earned her Ph.D. in physical chemistry working with Wilfried Heller (1965). Her doctoral research provided new knowledge in evaluating light scattering methods to determine the size of particles. She also taught undergraduate chemistry at this time. Her doctoral dissertation, "Determination of particle size distributions in emulsions by light scattering" was published in 1965.

== Personal life ==
She married Veteran Air Force Captain William Miller Greene in July 1955. She had three children: Willetta Greene Johnson, Victor M. Greene, and Lisa Kianne Greene. She was elected to Sigma Xi, the Scientific Research Society. She had no siblings.

== Career ==
=== Dow Chemical ===
In 1965, Greene joined the Dow Chemical Company's E. C. Britton Research Laboratory in Midland, Michigan. She was the first African-American woman to join the company in a professional position. Greene served as a Consultant on Polymers issues in the Saran Research Laboratory and the Styrene Butadiene (SB) Latex group often utilized her expertise and knowledge. At Dow, she researched colloid and latex chemistry, including interactions between latex and paper.

In 1970, Greene was promoted to senior research chemist at Dow Chemical. In 1973, she joined Dow Chemical's Designed Polymers Research Division, again working with latex, to find polymers that could improve latex. She was subsequently promoted to the position of senior research specialist in 1975. She continued to work for Dow Chemical until her retirement in 1990. She published several papers studying different properties that lend to the redispersement of latex. She also published work studying methodologies for determining the surface tension of liquids or solutions. She left Dow Chemical in 1990.

Greene filed for several patents during her career at Dow Chemical. In 1985, she was issued a patent entitled "Stable latexes containing phosphorus surface groups" describing a method of preparing a paper coating composition comprising the addition of from about 2 to about 30 percent of a modified latex containing phosphorus surface groups. In 1986, she was issued a follow-up patent entitled "Composite sheet prepared with stable latexes containing phosphorus surface groups" also employing emulsion polymerization techniques for preparing modified latex. In 1990, Greene was issued a patent entitled "Latex based adhesive prepared by emulsion polymerization" for the invention of a latex based pressure sensitive adhesive for coating conventional substrates to form an adhesive tape.

After decades of contribution to the science of polymers, she died in Midland on June 16, 1995.

== Philanthropy ==
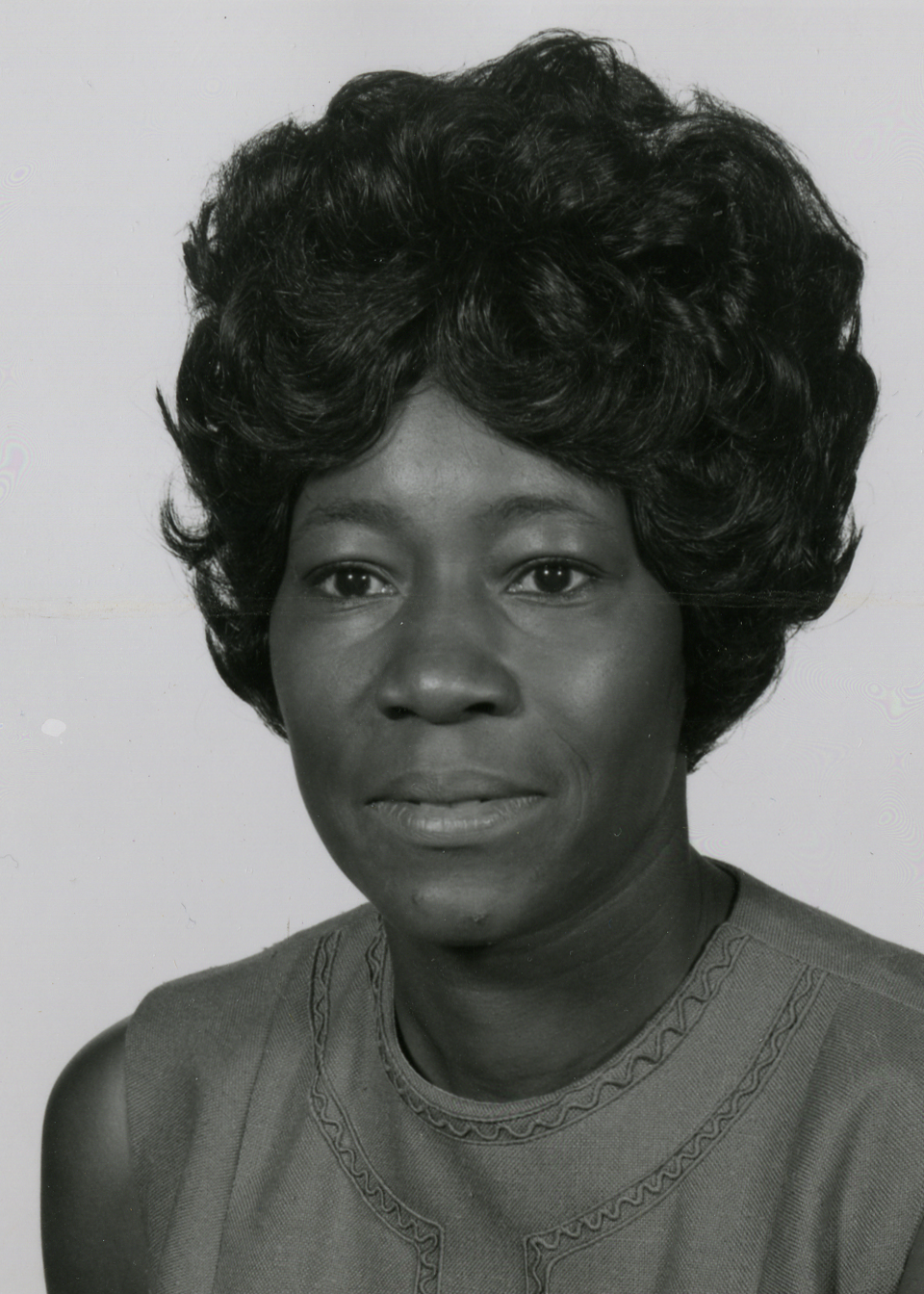
Greene in 1970

Greene was a charter member of the Midland, Michigan Alumni Chapter of the Delta Sigma Theta sorority, a national public service group emphasizing work with African American women. The Midland chapter was chartered in 1984.

== Acknowledgements ==
28 years following her death, the National Historical Chemical Landmark (NHCL) was awarded to Greene by The American Chemical Society (ACS). The celebration, which took place on October 27, 2023, was held at Wayne State University in Detroit, Michigan.

== Patents ==
Greene held a number of US patents including a latex-based adhesive using a carboxylic acid copolymerizing agent, and latex polymers with phosphates used as coatings:

- 4968740: Latex-based adhesive prepared by emulsion polymerization
- 4609434: Composite sheet prepared with stable latexes containing phosphorus surface groups
- 4506057: Stable latexes containing phosphorus surface groups
