= Bill Van Tichelt =

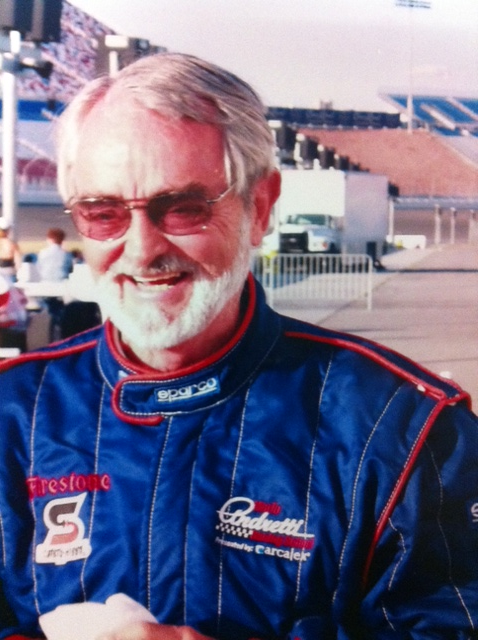
Bill VanTichelt

Bill VanTichelt (William VanTichelt or Bill VanTech); born February 17, 1935, in Kalamazoo, Michigan, is the creator of VanTech Motorcycles (Van Tech Motorcycles).

== Early years ==
Moving with his family to Southern California, Bill attended South Pasadena High School, where he graduated in 1952. In 1953, Bill attended Northrop Aero Institute, and graduated from Cal Poly San Luis Obispo in 1956 with a Bachelor of Science degree in Mechanical Engineering. After graduation, Bill accepted a position in the research and development department of Frebank Co., based in Glendale, California. During Bill's tenure in this position, he led the design and development of a snap action mechanism for a pressure switch that was utilized by NASA in the production of the Saturn V launch vehicle.

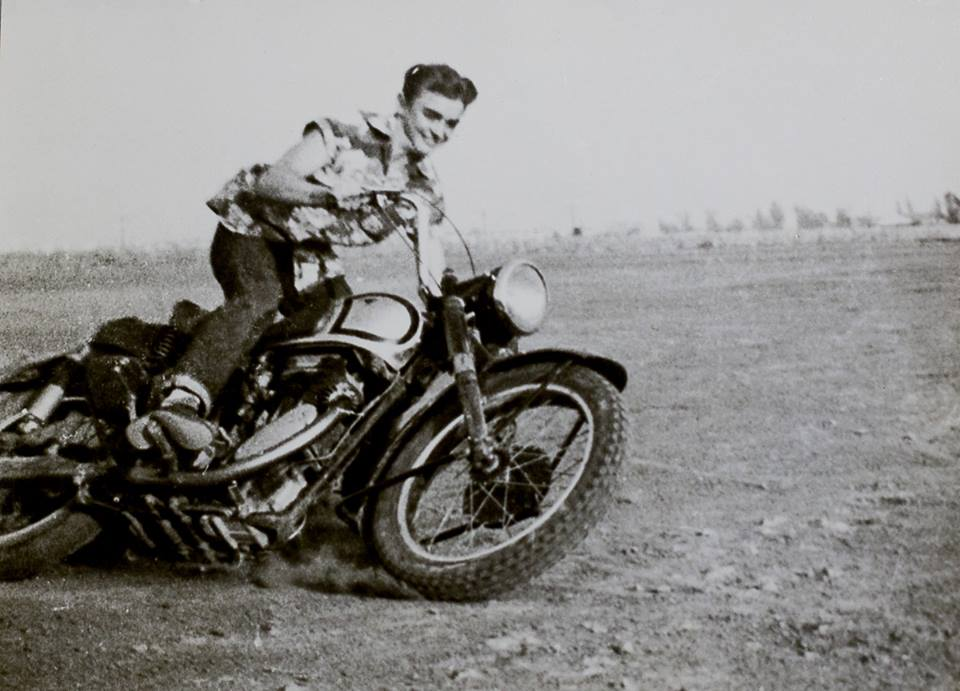
Bill VanTichelt – raising the dust

== Career ==
In 1960, Bill along with his father, Bill VanTichelt Sr., formed VanTech Engineering, located in Visalia, California. VanTech initially began as a design and production shop of specialized hardware for the missile industry. However, in the early sixties, Bill became interested in karting and began applying his engineering background to build a faster kart.

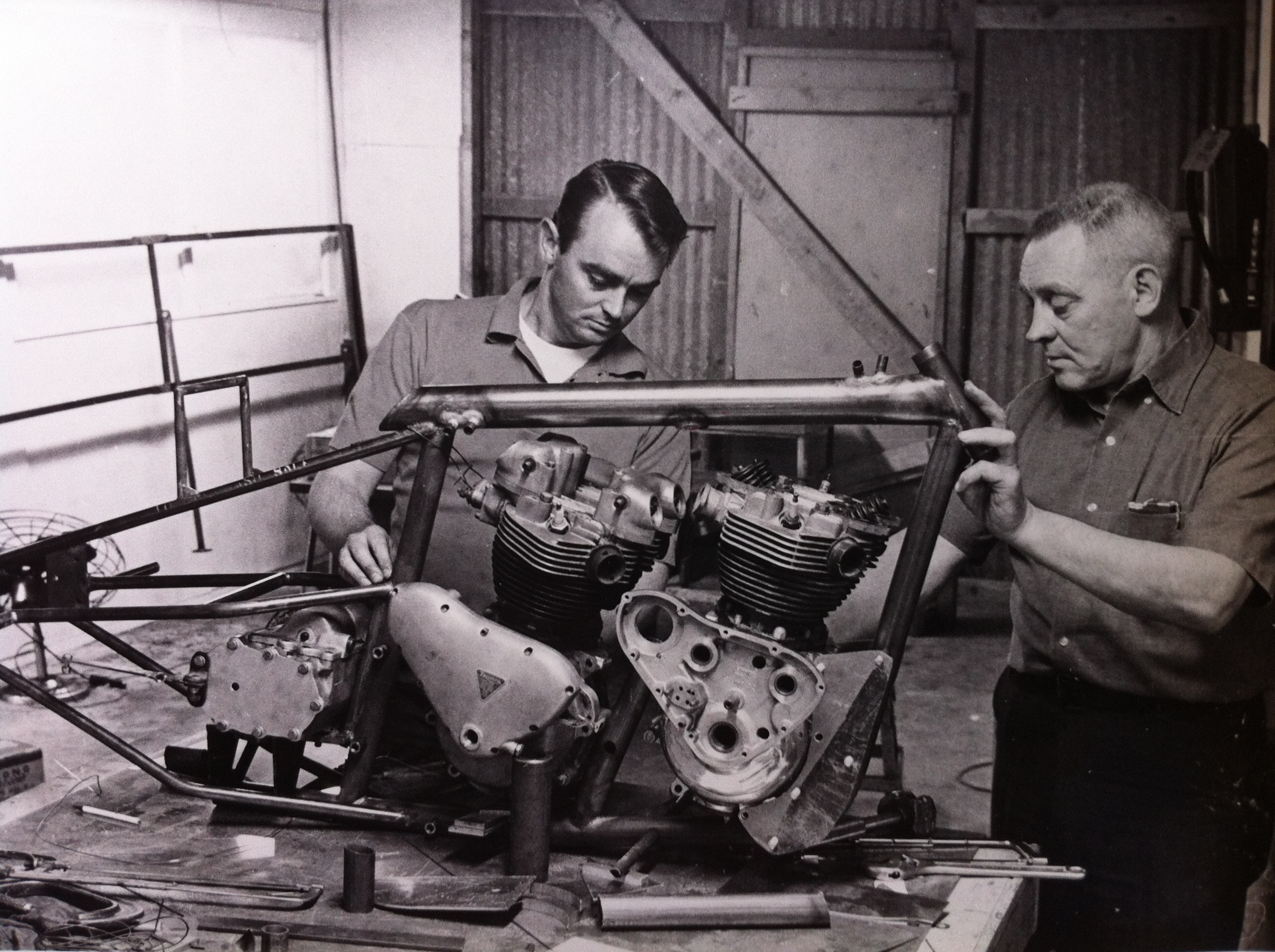
Bill VanTichelt Sr. and Jr.

Bill then developed and VanTech produced speed equipment for kart engines. Particularly, Bill developed a reed valve intake manifold for the McCulloch kart engines in 1961.

In 1962, Bill and his father spontaneously decided to build a small pseudo-dirt bike. Their self-designed VanTech frame was paired with bicycle wheels and one of the McCulloch kart engines with the souped-up VanTech manifold. This little prototype however, was the start of bigger things. In early 1963, Ray Hook, the creator of Blendzall Racing Oil, hired VanTech to create a special bike for one of Blendzall's sponsored riders, which bike went on to win every 100cc race it was entered into. With that success, Bill went on to design, fabricate and build two production bikes.

== Motorcycles ==
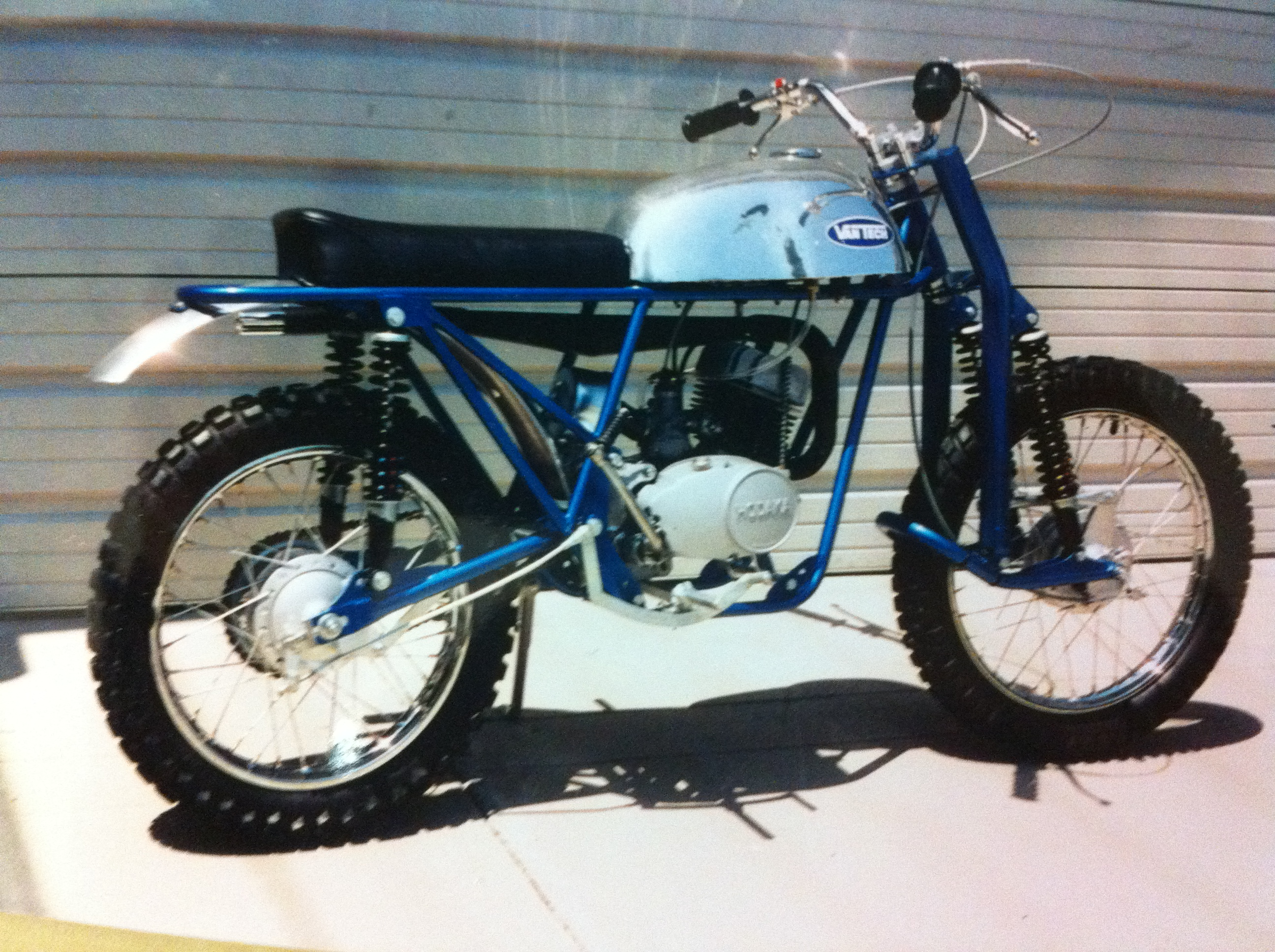
Prototype VanTech Hodaka 90 owned by Paul Stannard – restored by Lee Fabry

The first model was "The Scrambler" and was developed as an out-and-out racing machine powered by a McCulloch MAC7 kart engine (99cc to 125cc models fit the VanTech mounts). The second model was the "Trials 80". This bike was identical to the Scrambler but was powered by a Yamaguchi (now known as Hodaka) motorcycle engine (originally 80cc). The Scrambler and the Trials 80 gained VanTech a reputation as a builder of sturdy, light and well-machined frames. Bill was a stickler for detail – all of the frames were hand-crafted and jig-built, for precise alignment, and the joints where the tubes meet were all milled to fit. The rear suspension was a conventional swing arm set-up and the front was leading link. Bill in an interview with Cycle World in 1963, stated that he was uncertain what combination of rake and trail would produce the handling characteristics he wanted, so he reviewed all the Cycle World road tests of scramble style bikes to identify those with the desired handling combination and went from there – not exactly the most scientific process, but it produced the desired results – excellent handling.

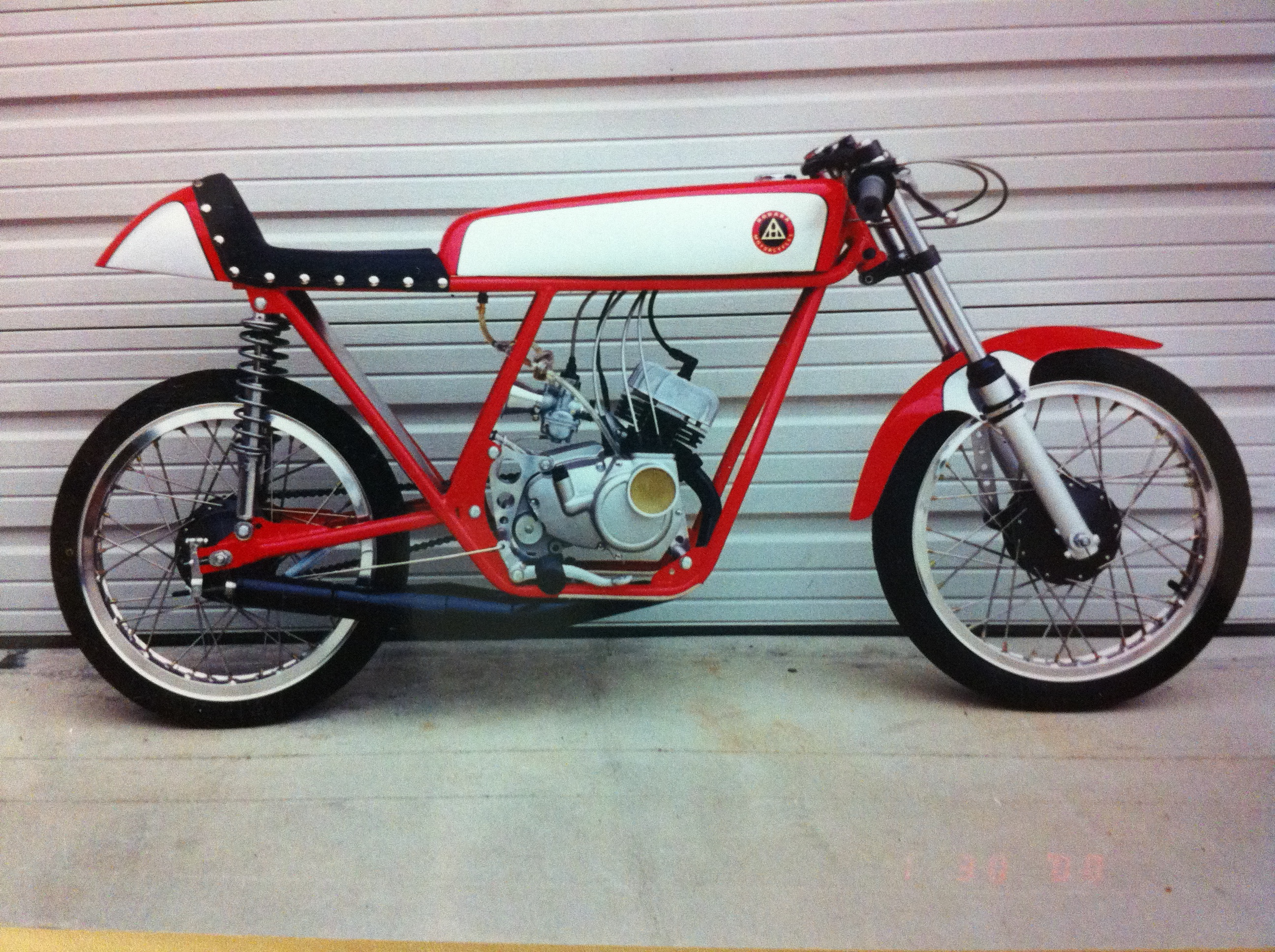
VanTech Road Racer – restored by Lee Fabry

The MAC Scrambler was also the beginning of the VanTech Leading Link Fork. In addition to giving 6+ inches of travel, the fork was approximately four pounds lighter than any telescopic fork then available.

In 1964, VanTech's first factory sponsored rider was Joey Petz, who went on to win practically every 100cc race he entered on the VanTech Scrambler. VanTech produced almost 200 of the first-series Scrambler motorcycles under the VanTech label. During this period of production, VanTech was the only other manufacturer besides Harley Davidson producing motorcycles in the United States. The bikes were considered well-made, fast and quite exciting to ride given their small-displacement engines.

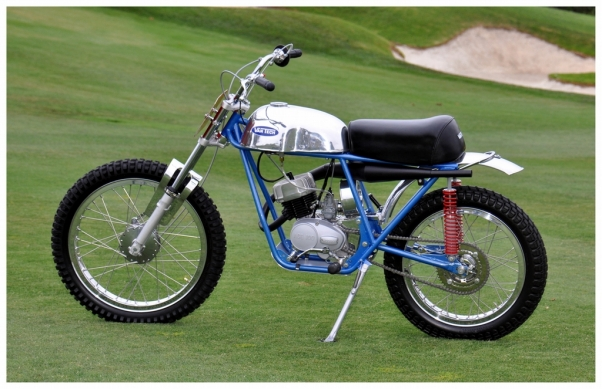
Southern California Desert Racer, restored by Lee Fabry, owned by Gary Parker

== The Kits ==
In late 1966, Dick MacCoon of Grant Industries (known for its famous Grant piston rings), contacted Bill to discuss joining forces to create what is now known as the "Grant-VanTech Kits". A first of its kind, the kits gave riders the ability to convert a variety of lightweight motorcycles to a scrambler, road racer or TT special, or to build their own customized bike.

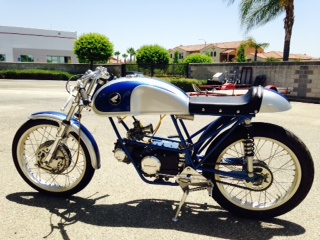
VanTech Honda 90 Cafe Racer owned by Rudy Pock, restored by Scott Turner, Team Scott Racing

== Grant VanTech Kits ==
The Grant VanTech Kit Program resulted in an assortment of chassis parts that enabled 100cc Honda, Yamaha or Bridgestone owners to build a serious bike very economically, including the VanTech Harley Baja 100. The Van Tech frame was lighter, stronger and handled better than any other small-bore machines of the day. Bob Braverman, technical editor of Cycle Guide and an avid motorcycle enthusiast, wrote a series of how-to articles based on various project bikes he completed, such as the VanTech Honda 160 'a go', the VanTech Honda 450 and the VanTech-framed BSA 441 (441cc) unit single dirt bike.

Bill's reputation for his superior VanTech frames was well known in the industry and led to a collaboration with Gordon Jennings from which they created a prototype VanTech Frame for a Bridgestone 350 GTR. The resulting bike was affectionately known as the "son of secret weapon." Bill also built another bike for Ray Hook of Blendzall Oil at this time, who was looking for a twin-engine VanTech bike. The 250cc VanTech was however, something of a handful to ride, and soon acquired the nickname the "Widowmaker."

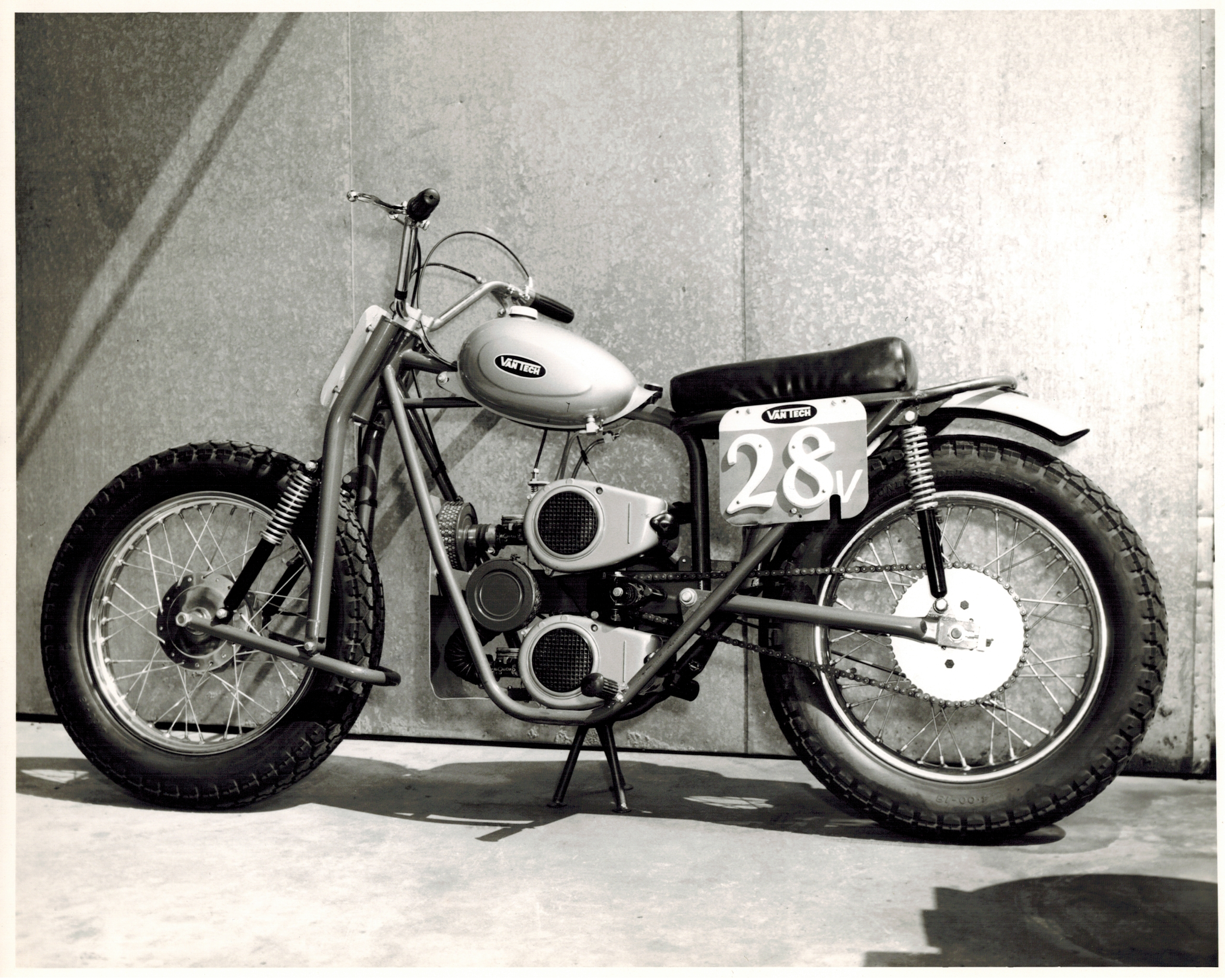
The "Widowmaker" – twin engines

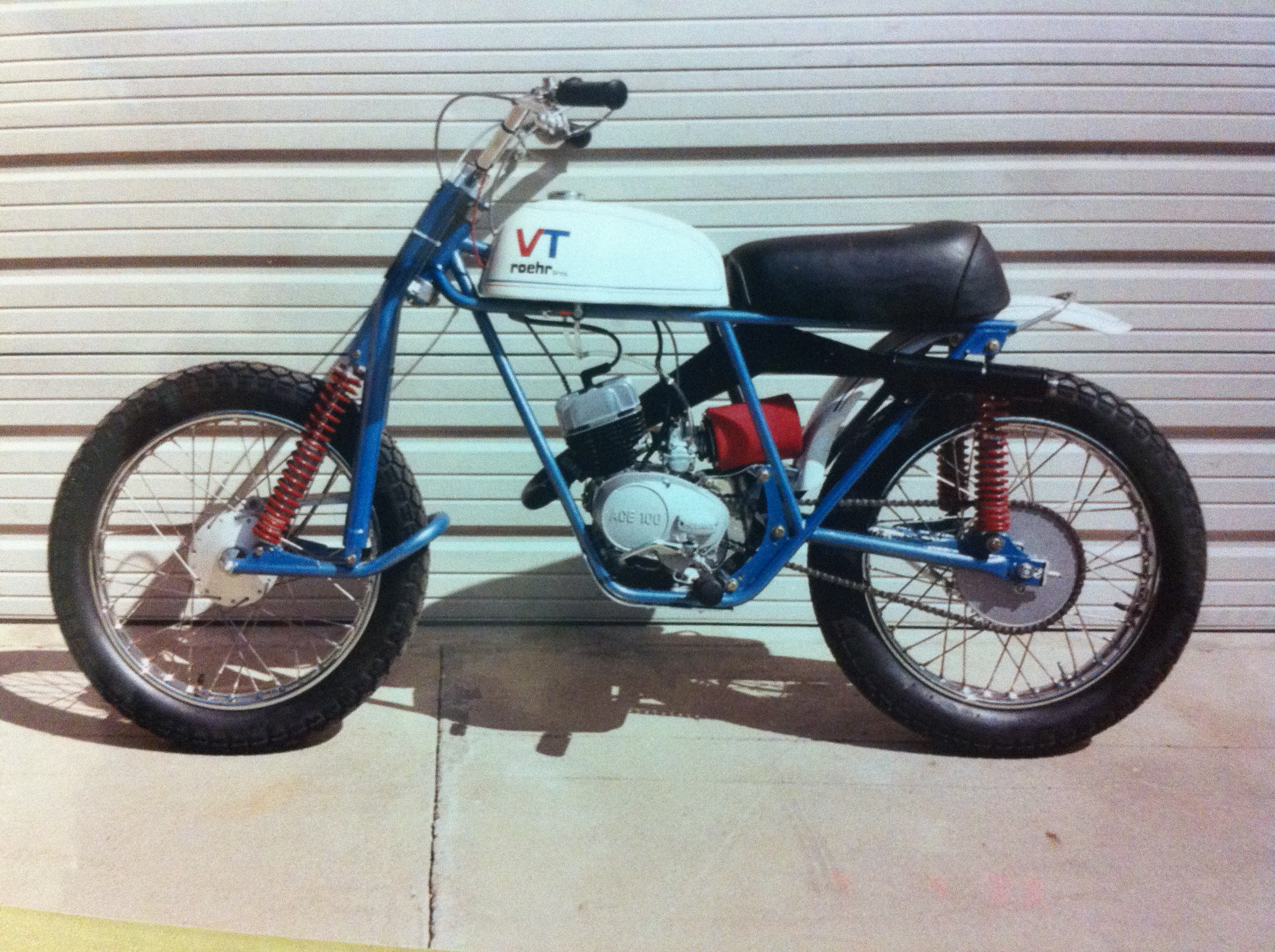
Roehr/VanTech Hodaka 100 owned by Rudy Pock – restored by Lee Fabry

== Roehr VanTech Kits ==
In 1968, the Grant-VanTech Kits were acquired by the Roehr Brothers (Duane Roehr) and became known as the "Roehr-VanTech" line of frames and chassis kits. The use of the Roehr-VanTech kits created such notables as the 1969 VanTech Hodaka 90cc, the Yamaha-VanTech Project II, created as a project bike by Modern Cycle in April 1970 from a Yamaha 125cc engine. The bike was supplied with Van Tech Springer forks which were noted as having an impressive degree of adjustment. And, the Kawaski VanTech made from a Kawasaki G3TR and road tested by Modern Cycle in September 1970 where it was described as "light as the proverbial feather, and handled awfully fast."

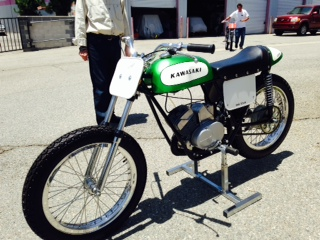
VanTech Kawasaki 125cc Flat Track owned by Rudy Pock – restored by Lee Fabry

While VanTech motorcycles may not have become the biggest dirt bike manufacturer in the US, it was certainly one of the first. To this day, VanTech motorcycles remain highly collectible vintage American made bikes.

In recognition of Bill's contributions to motorcycle history, in 2017 Bill VanTichelt was inducted into the Trailblazers Hall of Fame.

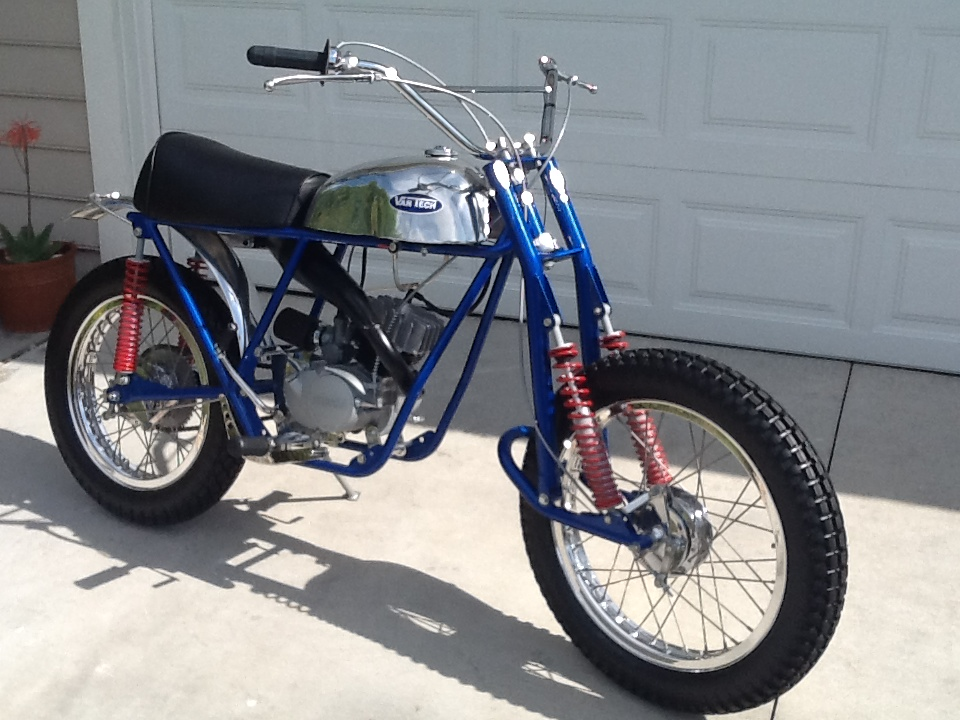
VanTech Hodaka 100 Scrambler with VanTech Leading Link Fork owned by Gary Parker – restored by Lee Fabry

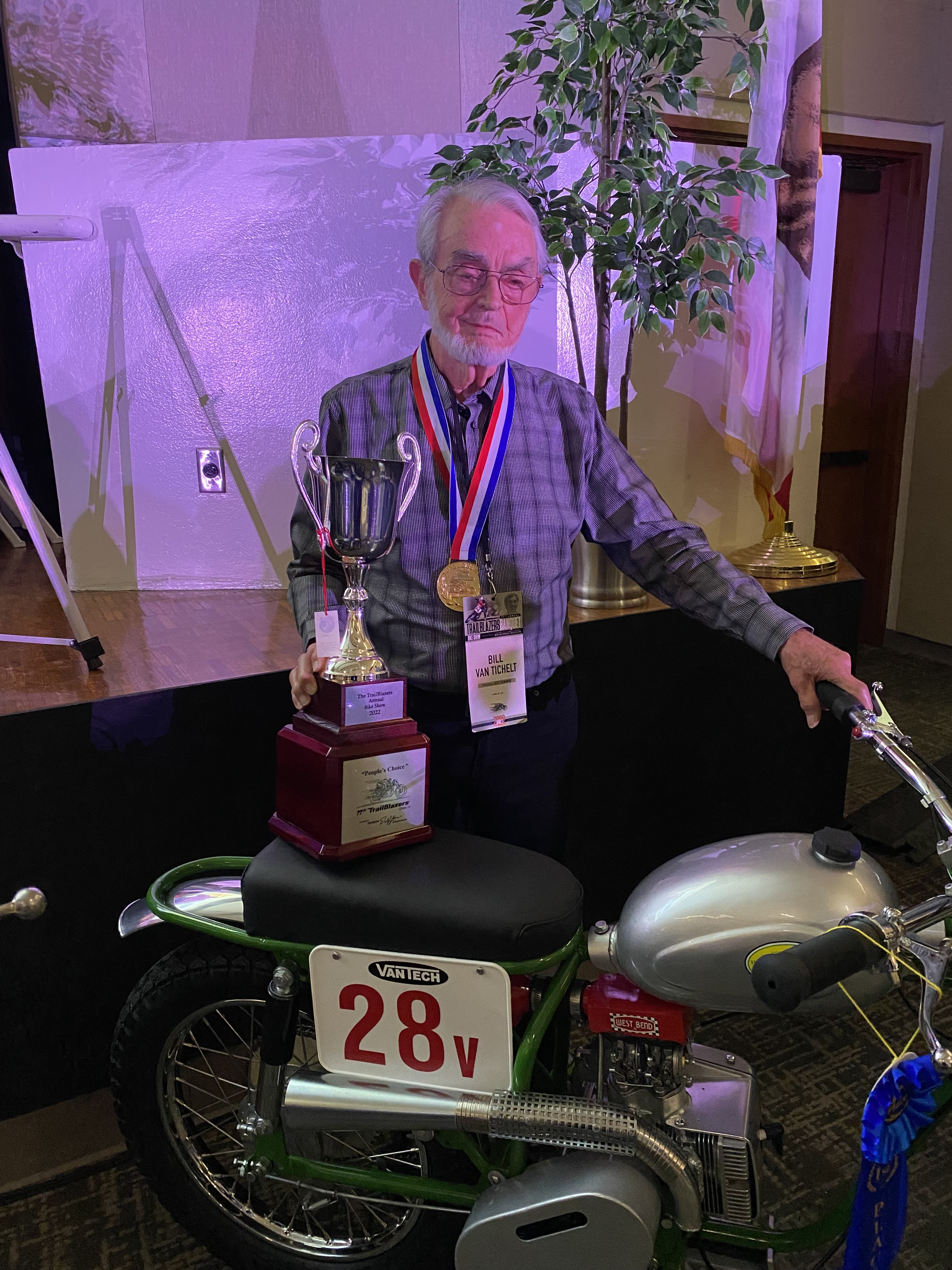
Trailblazers Hall of Fame
