= Mark Blagrove =

British research psychologist

Mark Thomas Blagrove
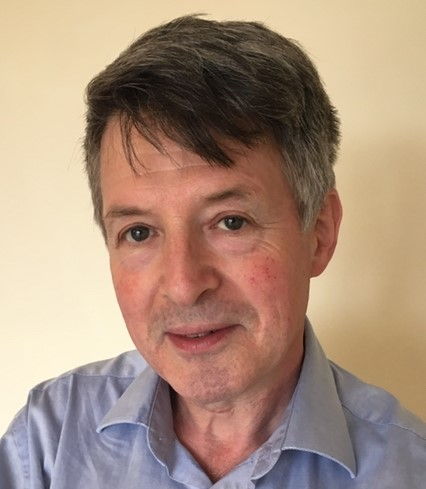
- Occupations: Professor of Psychology; Director of the Swansea University Sleep Laboratory

Academic background
- Education: The Windsor Boys' School; MA, Natural Sciences, Fitzwilliam College, Cambridge University; PhD, Brunel University London
- Thesis: The narrative of dream reports (1989)
- Doctoral advisor: Kuper, A; Hudson, L; Wright, M

Academic work
- Discipline: Psychology
- Sub-discipline: Sleep and cognition
- Institutions: Research Fellow, Loughborough University; Lecturer / Senior Lecturer / Reader / Professor, Swansea University
- Main interests: Research into sleep, dreaming, memory, learning, and REM sleep
- Website: Profile at Swansea University

Mark Blagrove is a British research psychologist who specializes in the study of sleep and dreams.

He is a professor of psychology at Swansea University in Wales, and is Director of the Swansea University Sleep Laboratory.

== Education ==
From 1979 to 1982, Blagrove studied for an MA in Natural Sciences at Fitzwilliam College, Cambridge, in England. He then went on to obtain a PhD in 1989 at Brunel University London, where he published a doctoral thesis titled "The narrative of dream reports". In 2019-2020, Blagrove gained a Graduate Certificate in Humanistic and Psychodynamic Counselling from Goldsmiths, University of London.

== Career ==
From 1989 to 1991, Blagrove was a research fellow at Loughborough University in the School of Sport, Exercise and Health Sciences.

Since 1991, Blagrove has worked at Swansea University in Wales, initially as a lecturer, then senior lecturer, reader, and finally professor of psychology. He specializes in the study of "the relationship between sleep and cognition, including effects of sleep loss, memory consolidation functions of sleep, causes and possible functions of dreaming, nightmares, and lucid dreams."

Blagrove is Director of the Swansea University Sleep Laboratory, which "investigates sleep, dreaming, and what happens when people are deprived of sleep."

He is a past President of the International Association for the Study of Dreams (IASD), a Fellow of the British Psychological Society, and a Consulting Editor for the journal Dreaming, published by the American Psychological Association on behalf of the International Association for the Study of Dreams.

== Selected research ==
=== Suggestibility ===
An early study by Blagrove in 1996 showed that sleep deprivation causes a trend for greater suggestibility during interrogation. That is, they "have reduced cognitive ability or motivation to discriminate and detect discrepancies between original and misleading information."

=== Sensory processing sensitivity ===
In humans, high sensory processing sensitivity refers to greater responsivity to stimuli, slower, deeper processing, aesthetic sensitivity, and low threshold for sensory discomfort. It is measured by the highly sensitive person scale. Blagrove and colleagues have shown that score on the HSPS correlates significantly with ability to detect spoken words that are present but degraded in auditory stimuli and that the Positive Sensory Responsivity dimension of HSPS predicts perceptual advantage in detection and identification of visually degraded stimuli (Williams & Blagrove, 2024). Sensory processing sensitivity has been shown by Blagrove and colleagues to be a predisposing factor for nightmares.

=== Lucid dreaming ===
Blagrove has shown personality and cognitive characteristics of people who frequently have lucid dreams, and addressed the possibility of using training to increase individuals' frequency of lucid dreaming. However, Soffer–Dudek's review of lucid dreaming research, which included the personality findings above, concluded that there may be possible adverse effects of lucid dreaming and of induction of lucid dreaming.

=== Dream-lag ===
One of Blagrove's series of findings concerns the "dream-lag effect". A study in 2011 "investigates evidence, from dream reports, for memory consolidation during sleep". A second study in 2015 shows that "incorporation of details from waking life events into rapid eye movement sleep dreams has been found to be highest on the night after, and then 5–7 nights after events (termed, respectively, the day-residue and dream-lag effects).". A third study into the "dream-lag effect" in 2019 was "the first to categorize types of waking life experiences and compare their incorporation into dreams across multiple successive nights." The chosen categories were: major daily activities (such as going to work or university, meals and shopping); personally significant events (such as emotional events); and major concerns (such as money problems or exam stress), and participants were asked to maintain diary entries both for these categories of waking experience, accompanying emotion and its intensity, and to record their dreams. The study found that "personally significant events persist, but not major daily activities or concerns."

=== Dreaming, metaphor, insight, and memory consolidation ===
A study by Blagrove in 2013 looks into largely-anecdotal claims that "dreams can be a source of personal insight", and finds tangential support for the "facilitative effect of sleep on cognitive insight" and of REM sleep on emotional memory consolidation, and for the emergence of insight from the metaphorical representations of waking life found in dreams.

Another study in 2015 also showed theoretical support for such claims, finding that rapid eye movement (REM) sleep plays a role in the "consolidation of emotional memories and the creative formation of connections between new and older memories."

A third study in 2019, assessing Exploration-Insight scores (a measure of Gains in Dream Interpretation proposed in 1996 by Clara Hill in Working with Dreams in Psychotherapy) following discussion of REM dreams, non-REM dreams, and daydreams, suggests that "insight might be produced by embodied and metaphorical thinking in dreams." The methods for assessing insights gained following group dream discussions in Blagrove's 2013, 2015 and 2019 papers were extended in Blagrove et al. (2025). This showed that interpretations of dreams by ChatGPT are rated by dreamers on average as very or moderately accurate, and with personal insight occurring, but with exploration of the dream being less thorough and involving than in dream group discussions.

Whereas Blagrove had found evidence for memory consolidation being promoted by sleep and by dreaming, he and Lockheart later suggested that dreaming might only have a function after sleep, when the dreams are shared with others. Dreams would thus be fictions produced while asleep, but which only have an effect and significance when recalled and shared after waking. This approach was expanded on in Blagrove and Lockheart (2023) The Science and Art of Dreaming, in Psyche magazine (2024), and in The Psychologist (2024), a publication of the British Psychological Society.

Blagrove has replicated Mark Solms' findings on brain damage causing the cessation of dreaming and extended these to take account of relationship with severity of brain damage.

== DreamsID ==
DreamsID (short for "dreams illustrated and discussed" or "dreams interpreted and drawn") is a practical, collaborative project between artist Julia Lockheart and Blagrove. They hold 60 – 90 minute sessions with a dream sharer and an invited audience, and while the dream is shared and discussed, Lockheart draws and paints the dream, in real-time, on a torn-out page from Sigmund Freud's book, The Interpretation of Dreams, to create "a tapestry of elements, plot, metaphoric imagery, and Freud's words." This follows a Dadaist and surrealist performance aesthetic (Lockheart et al., 2021). Then, later in the session, the audience is invited to join in the discussion, referencing the dream to waking life, according to the method devised by psychiatrist Montague Ullman.

In the course of the sessions, Lockheart and Blagrove began to notice that the sharing of the dreams and the discussions were having an effect not only on them but on some of the audience, and that the sessions were invoking empathy toward the subjects sharing their dreams. As a result of this, the collaborators went on to co-author an important scientific paper, "Testing the Empathy Theory of Dreaming: The Relationships Between Dream Sharing and Trait and State Empathy", which was later published in Frontiers in Psychology.

As well as being an artist, Julia Lockheart is an Associate Lecturer at Goldsmiths, University of London, and a Professor at Swansea College of Art, University of Wales Trinity Saint David. Her own research includes "languaging within metadesign and the relationship between writing and collaboration in arts education."

In April 2019, the BBC World Service Television programme CrowdScience broadcast a segment in which Lockheart is shown painting as a candidate shares her dream.

In October 2020 and January 2021, Blagrove and Lockheart held online events to commemorate the 120th anniversaries of Sigmund Freud's patient Dora telling two dreams to Freud. The first dream was of being rescued from a burning house by her father, the second was of travelling to her father's funeral. The aim of the events was to discuss with expert panel and worldwide audience how Dora's two dreams could be related to her distressing family circumstances The two dreams were painted by Lockheart during the discussions.

In June 2023 Blagrove and Lockheart held an event at the C. G. Jung Institute, Zürich, in Küsnacht, Switzerland, as part of the conference marking the 75th anniversary of the founding of the Institute. In recognition of the Dadaist influence on the DreamsID collaboration, in July 2023 Blagrove and Lockheart held an event at the Cabaret Voltaire, Zürich. Cabaret Voltaire was the birthplace of Dadaism in 1916. The two dream sharing and discussion events are detailed in Blagrove and Lockheart (2025), as part of an exploration of the relationships between Jungian psychology, Dada, and the sharing and painting of dreams.

To commemorate the centenary of the founding of Surrealism, Lockheart and Blagrove held a symposium, Methodological Approaches to Studying Dreams: Surrealism and Dreams, Film, Poetry, and Art: with Live Painting of Breton's (1924) Urinal Dream, at the 41st annual conference of the International Association for the Study of Dreams in The Netherlands, in June 2024. In the symposium Blagrove and attendees discussed André Breton's 1924 dream of a flying urinal (Spector, 1989) while the dream was painted by Lockheart.

As part of the International Society for the Study of Surrealism's commemorations in October 2024 for the centenary of the founding of Surrealism, Julia Lockheart's painting of the flying urinal dream that André Breton had in 1924 (Spector, 1989) was chosen for exhibition at the American University of Paris. Also at the conference Lockheart and Blagrove held a Dream Salon participatory performance with live discussion and painting of an attendee's dream.

In November 2024 Lockheart and Blagrove held a Dream Salon at the Freud Museum London in which a recent dream of ceramic artist Abigail Shama was discussed and painted.

Artworks by Lockheart of dreams discussed at Dream Salons were included as part of exhibitions on the science, anthropology and art of dreaming at Musée des Confluences, Lyon, France, October 2024 to August 2025, titled Le temps d'un rêve / Within the space of a dream; with paintings being shown on The Exhibition Route section 7; and at Museum Schallaberg, Austria.

== Publications ==
=== Books ===
- Blagrove, Mark; Lockheart, Julia (10 February 2023). The Science and Art of Dreaming. Routledge. ISBN 978-0367479961 (Hardcover), ISBN 978-0367479947 (Paperback)

=== Book chapters ===
- Elizabeth, Brodersen; Isabelle, Meier; Valeria, Céspedes Musso, eds. (9 April 2025). Jungian and Interdisciplinary Analyses of Emotions: Method and Imagery. Routledge. ISBN 978-1-003-56494-2. Chapter 15: Mark Blagrove, Julia Lockheart (2025), "Jung, Dada, and the Discussion and Painting of Dreams" doi:10.4324/9781003564942-21.

=== Articles in journals ===
Blagrove has authored or co-authored over 50 academic and research papers, published in peer reviewed scientific journals, during his career:

Articles in journals
- Ruby, P.; Lockheart, J.; Blagrove, M. (2025). "Review of exhibition Le temps d'un rêve / In the space of a dream, at Musée des Confluences, Lyon, France – 18th October 2024 to 24th August 2025". International Journal of Dream Research. 18 (1). International Association for the Study of Dreams: 98–107. doi:10.11588/ijodr.2025.1.109180.
- Fisher-Hicks, S.; Lovett, V.; Wood, R. L.; Blagrove, M. (2025). "The association of brain injury severity with dream cessation and nightmares". Neuropsychologia 109209. Elsevier. doi:10.1016/j.neuropsychologia.2025.109209.
- Williams, J.; Blagrove, M. (2024). "An investigation testing the perceptual advantage of Sensory Processing Sensitivity and its associations with the Big Five personality traits". Journal of Research in Personality. 113 (104539) 104539. doi:10.1016/j.jrp.2024.104539.
- Carr, M.; Konkoly, K.; Mallett, R.; Edwards, C.; Appel, K.; Blagrove, M. (2023). "Combining presleep cognitive training and REM-sleep stimulation in a laboratory morning nap for lucid dream induction" (PDF). Psychology of Consciousness: Theory, Research, and Practice. 10 (4). American Psychological Association: 413–430. doi:10.1037/cns0000227. S2CID 218801845.
- Williams, J.; Blagrove, M. (2022). "Paranormal experiences, sensory-processing sensitivity, and the priming of pareidolia". PLOS One. 17 (9) e0274595. PLOS. Bibcode:2022PLoSO..1774595W. doi:10.1371/journal.pone.0274595. PMC 9473424. PMID 36103566.
- Reid, A.; Bloxham, A.; Carr, M.; van Rijn, E.; Basoudan, N.; Tulip, C.; Blagrove, M. (2022). "Effects of sleep on positive, negative and neutral valenced story and image memory". British Journal of Psychology. 113 (3). Wiley-Blackwell for British Psychological Society: 777–797. doi:10.1111/bjop.12559. PMC 9545409. PMID 35253902. S2CID 247252495.
- Blagrove, Mark; Lockheart, Julia (2022). "Dream-sharing and human self-domestication". International Journal of Dream Research. 15 (1): 86–94. doi:10.11588/ijodr.2022.1.83442.
- Blagrove, M.; Lockheart, J.; Carr, M.; Basra, S.; Graham, H.; Lewis, H.; Murphy, E.; Sakalauskaite, A.; Trotman, C.; Valli, K. (2021). "Dream sharing and the enhancement of empathy: Theoretical and applied implications". Dreaming. 31 (2): 128–139. doi:10.1037/drm0000165. S2CID 237975302.
- Lockheart, Julia; Holzinger, Brigitte; Katharina, Adler; Barrett, Deirdre; Nobus, Dany; Wessely, Zora; Blagrove, Mark (2021). "120th anniversary event for 'Dora' telling her burning house dream to Freud". International Journal of Dream Research. 14 (2): 202–208. doi:10.11588/ijodr.2021.2.77283.
- Carr, M.; Summers, R.; Bradshaw, C.; Newton, C.; Ellis, L.; Johnston, E.; Blagrove, M. (2020). "Frontal brain activity and subjective arousal during emotional picture viewing in nightmare sufferers". Frontiers in Neuroscience. 14 585574. Frontiers Media. doi:10.3389/fnins.2020.585574. PMC 7561419. PMID 33117126. S2CID 222003592. (Provisionally accepted).
- Blagrove, M.; Edwards, C.; van Rijn, E.; Reid, A.; Malinowski, J.; Bennett, P.; Carr, M.; Eichenlaub, J.; McGee, S.; Evans, K.; Ruby, P. (2019). "Insight from the consideration of REM dreams, non-REM dreams, and daydreams". Psychology of Consciousness: Theory, Research, and Practice. 6 (2). American Psychological Association: 138–162. doi:10.1037/cns0000167. S2CID 150016493.
- Schredl, M.; Struck, V.S.; Schwert, V.; Blei, M.; Henley-Einion, J.; Blagrove, M. (2019). "Gender Differences in the Dream Content of Children and Adolescents: The UK Library Study". The American Journal of Psychology. 132 (3). University of Illinois Press: 315–324. doi:10.5406/amerjpsyc.132.3.0315. S2CID 204382239.
- Blagrove, M.; Hale, S.; Lockheart, J.; Carr, M.; Jones, A.; Valli, K. (2019). "Testing the Empathy Theory of Dreaming: The Relationships Between Dream Sharing and Trait and State Empathy". Frontiers in Psychology. 10. Frontiers Media: 1351. doi:10.3389/fpsyg.2019.01351. PMC 6596280. PMID 31281278.
- Eichenlaub, J.; van Rijn, E.; Phelan, M.; Ryder, L.; Gaskell, M.; Lewis, P.; Walker, M.; Blagrove, M. (2019). "The nature of delayed dream incorporation ('dream-lag effect'): Personally significant events persist, but not major daily activities or concerns". Journal of Sleep Research. 28 (1). European Sleep Research Society: e12697–. doi:10.1111/jsr.12697. PMC 6849581. PMID 29682834.
- Eichenlaub, J.; van Rijn, E.; Gaskell, M.; Lewis, P.; Maby, E.; Malinowski, J.; Walker, M.; Boy, F.; Blagrove, M. (2018). "Incorporation of recent waking-life experiences in dreams correlates with frontal theta activity in REM sleep". Social Cognitive and Affective Neuroscience. 13 (6). Oxford University Press: 637–647. doi:10.1093/scan/nsy041. PMC 6022568. PMID 29868897.
- van Rijn, E.; Reid, A.; Edwards, C.; Malinowski, J.; Ruby, P.; Eichenlaub, J.; Blagrove, M. (2018). "Daydreams incorporate recent waking life concerns but do not show delayed ('dream-lag') incorporations". Consciousness and Cognition. 58. Elsevier: 51–59. doi:10.1016/j.concog.2017.10.011. PMID 29128282. S2CID 25375543.
- Vallat, R.; Chatard, B.; Blagrove, M.; Ruby, P. (2017). "Characteristics of the memory sources of dreams: A new version of the content-matching paradigm to take mundane and remote memories into account". PLOS One. 12 (10). Public Library of Science: e0185262–. Bibcode:2017PLoSO..1285262V. doi:10.1371/journal.pone.0185262. PMC 5636081. PMID 29020066.
- Freeman, D.; Blagrove, M.; Espie, C.; et al. (2017). "The effects of improving sleep on mental health (OASIS): a randomised controlled trial with mediation analysis". The Lancet Psychiatry. 4 (10). Elsevier: 749–758. doi:10.1016/S2215-0366(17)30328-0. PMC 5614772. PMID 28888927.
- van Rijn, E.; Carter, N.; McMurtrie, H.; Willner, P.; Blagrove, M. (2017). "Sleep does not cause false memories on a story-based test of suggestibility". Consciousness and Cognition. 52. Elsevier: 39–46. doi:10.1016/j.concog.2017.04.010. PMID 28458092. S2CID 3068531.
- van Rijn, E.; Lucignoli, C.; Izura, C.; Blagrove, M. (2017). "Sleep-dependent memory consolidation is related to perceived value of learned material". Journal of Sleep Research. 26 (3). European Sleep Research Society: 302–308. doi:10.1111/jsr.12457. PMID 27634632.
- Schredl, M.; Henley-Einion, J.; Blagrove, M. (2016). "Dream Sharing, Dream Recall, and Personality in Adolescents and Adults". Imagination, Cognition and Personality. 36 (1). SAGE Publishing: 64–74. doi:10.1177/0276236615626337. S2CID 148559960.
- Smith, B.; Blagrove, M. (2015). "Lucid dreaming frequency and alarm clock snooze button use". Dreaming. 25 (4). American Psychological Association on behalf of International Association for the Study of Dreams: 291–299. doi:10.1037/drm0000012.
- van Rijn, E.; Eichenlaub, J.; Lewis, P.; Walker, M.; Gaskell, M.; Malinowski, J.; Blagrove, M. (2015). "The dream-lag effect: Selective processing of personally significant events during Rapid Eye Movement sleep, but not during Slow Wave Sleep". Neurobiology of Learning and Memory. 122. Elsevier: 98–109. doi:10.1016/j.nlm.2015.01.009. PMID 25683202.
- Edwards, C.; Malinowski, J.; McGee, S.; Bennett, P.; Ruby, P.; Blagrove, M. (2015). "Comparing personal insight gains due to consideration of a recent dream and consideration of a recent event using the Ullman and Schredl dream group methods". Frontiers in Psychology. 6. Frontiers Media: 831. doi:10.3389/fpsyg.2015.00831. PMC 4471350. PMID 26150797.
- Schredl, M.; Beaton, A.; Henley-Einion, J.; Blagrove, M. (2014). "Reduced dream-recall frequency in left-handed adolescents: A replication". Laterality: Asymmetries of Body, Brain and Cognition. 19 (4). Psychology Press: 473–488. doi:10.1080/1357650X.2013.862257. PMID 24286302. S2CID 25093386.
- Blagrove, M. (2014). "Individual differences in the variability of sleep times across the week". Journal of Sleep Research. 23 (supplement 1). European Sleep Research Society: 172. doi:10.1111/jsr.12213. PMID 25196246.
- Henley-Einion, J.; Blagrove, M. (2014). "Assessing the day-residue and dream-lag effects using the identification of multiple correspondences between dream reports and waking life diaries". Dreaming. 24 (2). American Psychological Association on behalf of International Association for the Study of Dreams: 71–88. doi:10.1037/a0036329.
- Blagrove, M.; Ruby, P.; Eichenlaub, J. (2013). "Dreams are made of memories, but maybe not for memory". Behavioral and Brain Sciences. 36 (6). Cambridge University Press: 609–610. doi:10.1017/S0140525X13001222. PMID 24304749.
- Edwards, C.; Ruby, P.; Malinowski, J.; Bennett, P.; Blagrove, M. (2013). "Dreaming and insight". Frontiers in Psychology. 4 (979). Frontiers Media: 979. doi:10.3389/fpsyg.2013.00979. PMC 3872037. PMID 24550849.
- Blagrove, M.; Fouquet, N.; Baird, A.; Pace-Schott, E.; Davies, A.; Neuschaffer, J.; Henley-Einion, J.; Weidemann, C.; Thome, J.; McNamara, P.; Turnbull, O. (2012). "Association of salivary-assessed oxytocin and cortisol levels with time of night and sleep stage". Journal of Neural Transmission. 119 (10). Springer Science+Business Media: 1223–1232. doi:10.1007/s00702-012-0880-1. PMID 22911329. S2CID 6052429.
- Fisher, S.; Lewis, K.; Bartle, I.; Ghosal, R.; Davies, L.; Blagrove, M. (2011). "Emotional content of dreams in obstructive sleep apnea-hypopnea syndrome patients and sleepy snorers attending a sleep-disordered breathing clinic". Journal of Clinical Sleep Medicine. 7 (1). American Academy of Sleep Medicine: 69–74. doi:10.5664/jcsm.28043. PMC 3041622. PMID 21344048.
- Blagrove, M.; Fouquet, N.; Henley-Einion, J.; Pace-Schott, E.; Davies, A.; Neuschaffer, J.; Turnbull, O. (2011). "Assessing the Dream-Lag Effect for REM and NREM Stage 2 Dreams". PLOS One. 6 (10) e26708. Public Library of Science. Bibcode:2011PLoSO...626708B. doi:10.1371/journal.pone.0026708. PMC 3202556. PMID 22046336.
- Blagrove, M.; Henley-Einion, J.; Barnett, A.; Edwards, D.; Seage, C. (2011). "A replication of the 5–7day dream-lag effect with comparison of dreams to future events as control for baseline matching". Consciousness and Cognition. 20 (2). Elsevier: 384–391. doi:10.1016/j.concog.2010.07.006. PMID 20739193. S2CID 6617552.
- Blagrove, M.; Seddon, J.; George, S.; Parrott, A.; Stickgold, R.; Walker, M.; Jones, K.; Morgan, M.; Blagrove, M.; Parrott, A. (2011). "Procedural and declarative memory task performance, and the memory consolidation function of sleep, in recent and abstinent ecstasy/MDMA users". Journal of Psychopharmacology. 25 (4). SAGE Publishing on behalf of the British Association for Psychopharmacology: 465–477. doi:10.1177/0269881110372545. PMC 3604193. PMID 20615932.
- Blagrove, M.; Bell, E.; Wilkinson, A. (2010). "Association of lucid dreaming frequency with Stroop task performance". Dreaming. 20 (4): 280–287. doi:10.1037/a0020881.
- Blagrove, M.; Morgan, C.; Curran, H.; Bromley, L.; Brandner, B. (2009). "The incidence of unpleasant dreams after sub-anaesthetic ketamine". Psychopharmacology. 203 (1). Springer Science+Business Media: 109–120. doi:10.1007/s00213-008-1377-3. PMID 18949459. S2CID 18555976.
- Blagrove, M.; Haywood, S. (2006). "Evaluating the awakening criterion in the definition of nightmares: how certain are people in judging whether a nightmare woke them up?". Journal of Sleep Research. 15 (2). European Sleep Research Society: 117–. doi:10.1111/j.1365-2869.2006.00507.x. PMID 16704565. S2CID 31935221.
- Blagrove, M.; Blakemore, S.; Thayer, B. (2006). "The ability to self-tickle following Rapid Eye Movement sleep dreaming". Consciousness and Cognition. 15 (2). Elsevier: 285–. doi:10.1016/j.concog.2005.06.007. PMID 16157489. S2CID 24195800.
- Blagrove, M.; Farmer, L.; Williams, E. (2004). "The relationship of nightmare frequency and nightmare distress to well-being". Journal of Sleep Research. 13 (2). European Sleep Research Society: 129–. doi:10.1111/j.1365-2869.2004.00394.x. PMID 15175092. S2CID 10281878.
- Blagrove, M.; Akehurst, L. (2001). "Personality and the modulation of effects of sleep loss on mood and cognition". Personality and Individual Differences. 30 (5). Elsevier: 819–828. doi:10.1016/S0191-8869(00)00075-1.
- Blagrove, M.; Hartnell, S. J. (2000). "Lucid dreaming: Associations with internal locus of control, need for cognition and creativity". Personality and Individual Differences. 28 (1): 41–47. doi:10.1016/S0191-8869(99)00078-1.
- Blagrove, Mark (1996). "Effects of Length of Sleep Deprivation on Interrogative Suggestibility". Journal of Experimental Psychology: Applied. 2 (1). American Psychological Association: 48–59. doi:10.1037/1076-898X.2.1.48.
- Blagrove, M.; Tucker, M. (1994). "Individual differences in locus of control and the reporting of lucid dreaming". Personality and Individual Differences. 16 (6): 981–984. doi:10.1016/0191-8869(94)90242-9.

=== Other articles ===
- Blagrove, M.; Roklicer, L.; Bueno, J.; Austin, O.; Foster, H.; Webb, M. (2025). "Assessment of exploration-insight gains following 'discussion' of a dream using ChatGPT". International Journal of Dream Research. 18 (Supplement 1): S24.
- Kim Mills (October 2023). "Speaking of Psychology: Why do we dream? With Mark Blagrove, PhD" (Podcast). American Psychological Association. Archived from the original on 20 January 2024. (Also transcript)
- Blagrove, Mark; Lockheart, Julia (13 May 2020). "The science of sleep: how sharing your dreams could help to improve your relationships". The Conversation. Archived from the original on 14 May 2020.
- Blagrove, Mark (9 September 2016). "Let's talk about dreams". BBC Science Focus. Archived from the original on 21 April 2020.
- Blagrove, Mark (August 2009). "Dreaming – motivated or meaningless?". The Psychologist. 22. The British Psychological Society: 680–683. Archived from the original on 21 April 2020.

== See also ==
- Dream interpretation – Assigning of meaning to dreams
