= Julia Lockheart =

British artist, academic and researcher

Julia Margaret Lockheart
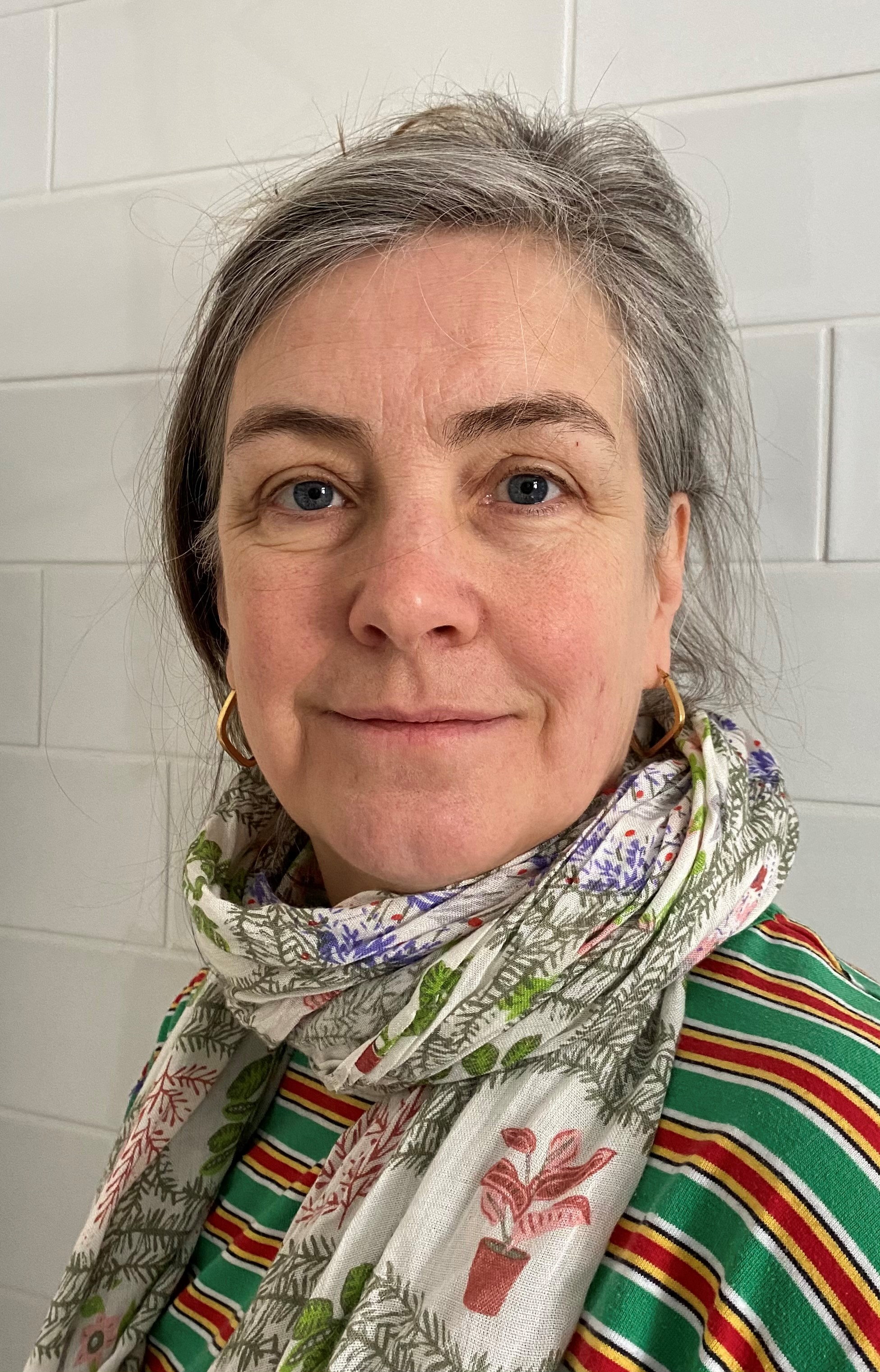
- Lockheart in 2021
- Occupations: Artist; researcher, professor

Academic background
- Education: BA Hons, in Fine Art, Saint Martins School of Art, University of the Arts London; MA, Fine Art, Manchester Metropolitan University; MA, TESOL, Institute of Education, University of London; PhD, Design, Goldsmiths, University of London.

Academic work
- Discipline: Writing in art and design
- Sub-discipline: Metadesign, contextual practice
- Institutions: Goldsmiths, University of London; Swansea College of Art, University of Wales Trinity Saint David.
- Website: Profile at University of Wales Trinity Saint David (Archived)

Julia Lockheart is a British artist, academic and researcher.

Lockheart is a Professor, Head of Contextual Practices, and Director of the Metadesign Research Centre (MRC) at Swansea College of Art, University of Wales Trinity Saint David; and metadesign researcher and Associate Lecturer in Design Writing at Goldsmiths, University of London.

== Education ==
Lockheart completed her Bachelor of Arts (BA, Honours) in Fine Art from Saint Martins School of Art, University of the Arts London; and her Foundation Diploma in Art and Design at the Stourbridge School of Art, Design and Technology. She also holds a Certificate in Teaching Learners with Specific Learning Difficulties (Dyslexia) from OCR at University College London's Centre for Human Communication; and an Adult Education Teaching Certificate in English as a second or foreign language (EFL) at Morley College in London. She holds a Master of Arts (MA) in Teaching English as a second or foreign language (TESOL) from the Institute of Education, University of London. and an MA in Fine Art from Manchester Metropolitan University. She was awarded her Ph.D from the Design Department of Goldsmiths, University of London, in 2016. Her thesis was on the subject of collaborative writing as a tool for design teams at Master's degree-level in higher education.

== Career ==
Lockheart currently works as a metadesign researcher and Associate Lecturer in Design Writing at Goldsmiths, University of London; as a Professor, Head of Contextual Practices, and Director of the Metadesign Research Centre (MRC) at Swansea College of Art, University of Wales Trinity Saint David; and also as a design and language consultant to several educational institutions internationally.

Lockheart's artistic practice concerns the depiction of dreams in artworks that then enable the sharing of the dream with others. This has led to research on the relationship of sharing dreams to empathy. Her other research strand focuses on writing in art and design, for which she is the co-founder and Director of the Writing-PAD network and co-founder and co-editor of the Journal of Writing in Creative Practice (published by Intellect Books).

Lockheart is a member of the National Association of Writers in Education, the Staff and Educational Development Association, and The Idries Shah Foundation, formerly The Institute for Cultural Research; Fellow of the Royal Society of Arts, and Senior Fellow of the Higher Education Academy.

== Writing ==
In 2018, Lockheart published an academic paper, "The importance of writing as a material practice for art and design students: A contemporary rereading of the Coldstream Reports". William Coldstream was an English realist painter and art teacher. In 1960, the council published its first report, named after Coldstream, which proposed and set out requirements for a new Diploma in Art and Design (Dip.A.D.), such as written essays and written examinations, and "helped to change the structure of art school teaching in Britain". According to the study carried out by Lockheart, the recommendation of academic writing for practitioners contained in the Coldstream Reports were misread and, as a result, strong beliefs were formed among academics and those in managerial positions throughout the Higher Education (HE) sector. Lockheart posits that "upholding these institutional assumptions may have an impact on how writing is used as a component of examination and therefore aligned with the need for academic parity across the HE sector, rather than as a tool for understanding and articulating practice." "As a result," she continues, "this article calls for the reinstatement of a unified HE art and design curriculum to be filled with a diversity of pedagogical [teaching] approaches, including writing practices, that are complementary to and inform the purposes of creative practice." As a result of this controversial mis-reading of the first report and a later report published in 1970, in 1970 "the Department of Education and Science ... recommended the humanities style academic thesis or dissertation as a part of the move from the [old] Diploma in Design to ..." the new Diploma in Art and Design (Dip.A.D.), and these mis-readings have "caused writing to be used as an examinable measure rather than as a tool for learning", to its detriment.

In a paper co-written with G. Melles in 2012, titled "Writing PAD: Writing purposefully in art and design: Responding to converging and diverging new academic literacies", Lockheart argues that while academic literacies and writing practices are well-established in older, traditional academic disciplines, more recent disciplines such as art and design have been forced to adopt these existing academic practices or to justify their own distinctive practices, and this has been a contentious issue in the discipline of art and design (which includes diverse fields, each with their differences and their own requirements, such as fine art, graphic design and fashion design).

Lockheart is also director and co-ordinator of Writing-PAD – short for Writing Purposefully in Art and Design – an online academic and research network connecting over 100 institutions.

Lockheart is also co-editor of the Journal of Writing in Creative Practice, which she co-founded with Goldsmiths' Emeritus Professor and University of Wales Trinity Saint David's Professor of Practice, John Wood.

== DreamsID ==
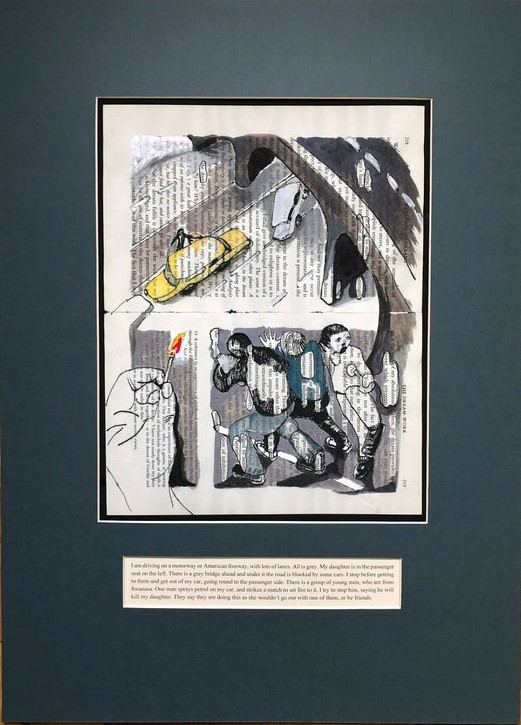
Interpretation of a dream of being attacked.

DreamsID (short for "Dreams Illustrated and Discussed" or "Dreams Interpreted and Drawn") is a practical, collaborative project between Lockheart and research psychologist, Professor Mark Blagrove. They hold 60 – 90 minute sessions with the dream subject and an invited audience, and while the subject shares their dream, with Blagrove helping to facilitate and visualize the dream narrative, Lockheart draws and paints the dream on a torn-out page from Sigmund Freud's book, The Interpretation of Dreams, to create "a tapestry of elements, plot, metaphoric imagery, and Freud's words." This follows a Dadaist and Surrealist performance aesthetic (Lockheart et al., 2021). Then, later in the session, the audience is invited to join in the discussion, referencing the dream to waking life, according to the method devised by psychiatrist Montague Ullman.

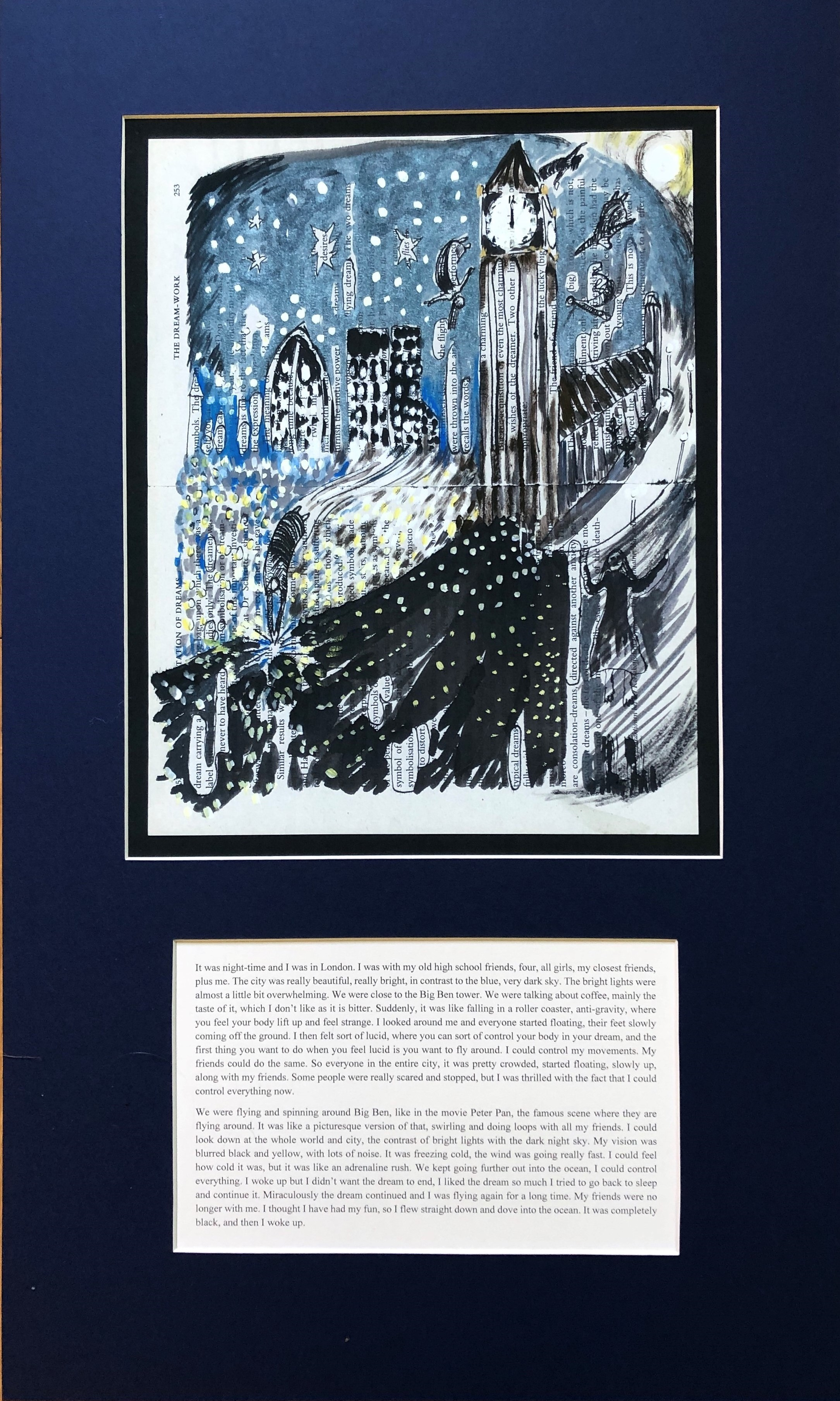
Interpretation of a dream of flying.

Lockheart and Blagrove began to notice that the sessions were invoking empathy toward the subjects sharing their dreams. As a result of this, the collaborators went on to co-author a scientific paper, "Testing the Empathy Theory of Dreaming: The Relationships Between Dream Sharing and Trait and State Empathy", which was later published in Frontiers in Psychology.

In April 2019, the BBC World Service Television programme CrowdScience broadcast a segment in which Lockheart is shown painting as a candidate shares her dream. In April 2020, Lockheart's artwork was featured in a New Scientist article on how the COVID-19 pandemic was affecting people's dreams. In October 2020 and January 2021, Lockheart and Blagrove held online events to commemorate the 120th anniversaries of Sigmund Freud's patient Dora telling two dreams to Freud. The first dream was of being rescued from a burning house by her father, the second was of travelling to her father's funeral.

In June 2023 Blagrove and Lockheart held an event at the C. G. Jung Institute, Zürich, in Küsnacht, Switzerland, as part of the conference marking the 75th anniversary of the founding of the Institute.

In recognition of the Dadaist influence on the DreamsID collaboration, in July 2023 Blagrove and Lockheart held an event at the Cabaret Voltaire, Zürich. The painting of the dream from the Cabaret Voltaire event and a film made of that event were included in an article in 2024 in Psyche magazine, on the science of dreaming, empathy and group bonding. In March 2024 a painting of a dream by Lockheart was included in the article "Does dreaming have a function?" in The Psychologist, a publication of the British Psychological Society.

The Zurich 2023 C.G. Jung Institute and Cabaret Voltaire Dream Salons and paintings are detailed in Blagrove and Lockheart (2025), as part of a discussion of the relationships between Jungian psychology, Dada, and the sharing and painting of dreams.

To commemorate the centenary of the founding of surrealism, Lockheart and Blagrove held a symposium, Methodological Approaches to Studying Dreams: Surrealism and Dreams, Film, Poetry, and Art: with Live Painting of Breton's (1924) Urinal Dream, at the 41st annual conference of the International Association for the Study of Dreams in The Netherlands, in June 2024. As part of the International Society for the Study of Surrealism's commemorations in October 2024 for the centenary of the founding of Surrealism, Lockheart's painting of the flying urinal dream that André Breton had in 1924 (Spector, 1989) was chosen for exhibition at the American University of Paris.

In November 2024, Lockheart and Blagrove held a Dream Salon at the Freud Museum London in which a recent dream of ceramic artist Abigail Shama was discussed and painted.

Lockheart's artworks were shown as part of the exhibition Le temps d’un rêve / Within the space of a dream at the Musée des Confluences, Lyon, France, October 2024 to August 2025. Lockheart was interviewed in April 2025 for the catalogue of the exhibition TRÄUME ... TRÄUMEN / DREAMING ... DREAMS; at Museum Schallaberg, Austria. Four of her paintings were shown as part of the exhibition.

== Selected publications ==
=== Books ===
- Blagrove, Mark; Lockheart, Julia (10 February 2023). The Science and Art of Dreaming. Routledge. ISBN 978-0367479961 (Hardcover), ISBN 978-0367479947 (Paperback)

=== Print publications / chapters ===
- Elizabeth, Brodersen; Isabelle, Meier; Valeria, Céspedes Musso, eds. (9 April 2025). Jungian and Interdisciplinary Analyses of Emotions: Method and Imagery. Routledge. ISBN 9781003564942. Chapter 15: Mark Blagrove, Julia Lockheart (2025), "Jung, Dada, and the Discussion and Painting of Dreams" doi:10.4324/9781003564942-21.
- Harper, Graeme, ed. (1 April 2013). A Companion to Creative Writing. London: Wiley-Blackwell. pp. 144–159. doi:10.1002/9781118325759. ISBN 9781118325759. Chapter 10: Edwards, H. and Lockheart, J. (2013), "Creative Writing and the Other Arts".
- Drew, L., ed. (2008). The Student Experience in Art and Design Higher Education: drivers for change. Cambridge: Jill Rogers Associates. ISBN 978-0-9547111-7-7. Lockheart, J., Gamble, M., Miller, J., Fisher, G., and Henderson, D. (2008), "Practice-based learning and teaching: a real world experience?"

=== Articles in journals ===
Articles in journals
- Ruby, P.; Lockheart, J.; Blagrove, M. (2025). "Review of exhibition Le temps d'un rêve / In the space of a dream, at Musée des Confluences, Lyon, France – 18th October 2024 to 24th August 2025". International Journal of Dream Research. 18 (1). International Association for the Study of Dreams: 98–107. doi:10.11588/ijodr.2025.1.109180.
- Lockheart, J. (Spring 2024). "Painting and socializing COVID-19 dreams". International Journal of Surrealism. 1 (2): 87–108. doi:10.1353/ijs.2024.a922369.
- Blagrove, Mark; Lockheart, Julia (April 2022). "Dream-sharing and human self-domestication". International Journal of Dream Research. 15 (1): 86–94. doi:10.11588/ijodr.2022.1.83442.
- Blagrove, M.; Lockheart, J.; Carr, M.; Basra, S.; Graham, H.; Lewis, H.; Murphy, E.; Sakalauskaite, A.; Trotman, C.; Valli, K. (2021). "Dream sharing and the enhancement of empathy: Theoretical and applied implications". Dreaming. 31 (2): 128–139. doi:10.1037/drm0000165. S2CID 237975302.
- Lockheart, Julia; Holzinger, Brigitte; Katharina, Adler; Barrett, Deirdre; Nobus, Dany; Wessely, Zora; Blagrove, Mark (2021). "120th anniversary event for 'Dora' telling her burning house dream to Freud". International Journal of Dream Research. 14 (2): 202–208. doi:10.11588/ijodr.2021.2.77283.
- Lockheart, J. (October 2018). "The importance of writing as a material practice for art and design students: A contemporary rereading of the Coldstream Reports". Art, Design & Communication in Higher Education. 17 (2): 151–75. doi:10.1386/adch.17.2.151_1. S2CID 187633645.
- Blagrove, M.; Hale, S.; Lockheart, J.; Carr, M.; Jones, A.; Valli, K. (2019). "Testing the Empathy Theory of Dreaming: The Relationships Between Dream Sharing and Trait and State Empathy". Frontiers in Psychology. 10. Frontiers Media: 1351. doi:10.3389/fpsyg.2019.01351. PMC 6596280. PMID 31281278.
- Blagrove, M.; Carr, M.; Jones, A.; Lockheart, J. (2018). "A New Theory of Dream Function: Telling Dreams Enhances Empathy towards the Dreamer". International Journal of Dream Research. 11 (Supplement 1): S55. Paper on the benefits of sharing dreams, given at the 35th annual conference of the International Association for the Study of Dreams, Scottsdale, Arizona, 16–20 June 2018.
- Blagrove, M.; Hale, S.; Lockheart, J.; Carr, M.; Jones, A. (2018). "The Relationship between Reading Fictional Novels, Dream Telling, Attitude to Dreams and Empathy". International Journal of Dream Research. 11 (Supplement 1): S65. Paper given at the 35th annual conference of the International Association for the Study of Dreams, Scottsdale, Arizona, 16–20 June 2018.
- Lockheart, J.; Raein, M. (2012). "No one expects the Design Inquisition: Searching for a metaphorical solution to thinking, researching and writing through Design". Journal of Writing in Creative Practice. 5 (2). Intellect Books (Europe), University of Chicago Press (USA): 275–289. doi:10.1386/jwcp.5.2.275_1. ISSN 1753-5190. Online ISSN 1753-5204.
- Lockheart, J.; Melles, G. (2012). "WritingPAD: Writing Purposefully in Art and Design: responding to converging and diverging new academic literacies". Arts and Humanities in Higher Education. 11 (4). London: SAGE Publishing: 346–362. doi:10.1177/1474022211432116. S2CID 143401169.
- Lockheart, J. (2011). "How can we use writing as a tool for collaboration across disciplines at PhD level? Co-writing fictional versions of the truth about someone else". Journal of Writing in Creative Practice. 3 (3). Intellect Books (Europe), University of Chicago Press (USA): 299–315. doi:10.1386/jwcp.3.3.299_1. ISSN 1753-5190. Online ISSN 1753-5204.

== See also ==
- Dream interpretation – Assigning of meaning to dreams
