= Psychology of religion and dreams =

Dreams have been interpreted in many different ways from being a source of power to the capability of understanding and communicating with the dead. Traditional forms of societies considered dreams as portals to another world, a spirit world. These societies would even say they could gain most of their religious ideas from dreams. They could identify the sacred and gain access to sacred realms or portals to the supernatural. Psychologists have been researching dreams as of the 21st century because the connection between religious connotations in dreams has brought about growth and health. However, many different psychologists claim there is very little evidence to the research on the psychology of religion and dreams.

== Dream interpretation ==
The contemporary 21st century has brought about a scientific materialism that can be detrimental to understanding the concept of dreams and how to interpret them. Traditionally, the concept of dreaming and interpreting dreams through religious means is universal. Some of the cultures around the world consider dream interpretation through their religious views as a means of spiritual discipline. A psychological view of this connection between religious views and dream interpretation stems from analyzing the content of dreams. The continuity theory has proposed that dream and waking cognition have everything in common except that dream cognition does not have the capability of being reflective. The counter argument to this theory would purpose that dream and waking cognition are completely different. Researchers such as Carl Jung and Sigmund Freud have claimed that dream processing must include a more symbolic approach, utilizing metaphors to explain its purposes.

=== History of dream interpretation ===
Many different researchers have tried to understand the purpose behind dreaming and state their most apprehensive work behind understanding early childhood dreams. Sigmund Freud (1900/1965) claimed that dreams from childhood were illustrations of wish-fulfillment dreams that begin in naivety during childhood and escalate into later adulthood. Carl Jung (1974) believed that childhood dreams were a sign of transpersonal wisdom from the unconscious. G. William Domhoff (1996) and S. H. Foulkes (1999) were both known for arguing childhood dreams as a reflection of the immature development involved in the consciousness of a young child, involving characteristics such as being passive and bland. Antti Revonsuo (2000) was in support of childhood dreams, in particular nightmares, to better support his idea of "threat simulation theory" found in dreaming.

== Worldviews ==
From the earliest of ones, dreams have been best interpreted as part of a religious worldview. Traditional societies wouldn't have had a problem declaring dreams to be more than just a psychological state, but of an encounter with a different realm. Most of the world's religious traditions in the 21st century have considered dreams to be sacred and part of a religious landscape. Each culture has a different way of expressing their traditions and contemporary beliefs on dream and interpretation. It is important to explore these different worldviews to gain a better sense of the relation between religion and dreams.

=== Tribal/indigenous worldview ===
Native Americans' belief of dreaming is more similar to Buddhism versus that of common Western beliefs. Their view of dreams and dream interpretation looks similar to that of an interactive conversation. The conversation happens between them and the world. They are able to have this conversation because they don't see a difference between dreaming and waking reality, but rather an overlapping experience. In this particular event in which they are overlapping worlds, they are able to open up their spiritual eyes to the visible and invisible, the audible and inaudible. The main goal of dreaming within this worldviews is twofold. They first look to gain a strong connection between them and the world as well as enhance their self-knowledge and respect among their tribe.

=== Western worldview ===
==== Christianity ====
The belief of dreams tying with religious themes in the Western worldview was not something that was naturally intuitive. By having belief in these things, the Western culture would open their minds to a non-rational and imaginative force that opens up people's mind to understanding realism with evil and how one can have hope over it. Pursuing dreams does not require God or gods and is why the Western culture receives this practice openly among their religious views and lifestyles. There has been debate among researchers as to whether researching dreams is worthwhile. Some have debated that dreams are purposeless and completely random, whereas other have suggested dreams having an adaptive function that allows for positive implications. Although there isn't findings of specifically lowering negative effects, research has alluded to dreams embellished with religious themes having a positive benefit for the user. The biggest finding was related to dreams and religion included exploring this connection as a form of coping. This effect of the Western worldview of dreams and dream interpretation with religious connotations has spread as far as the churches in Nigeria, Africa. These churches believed their leaders in the church would receive frequent dreams that would guide them and their followers to a special spiritual status.

=== Eastern worldview ===
==== Buddhism ====
Amidst different Hinduism and Buddhist contexts, there are different theories such as sleepless dreaming that appear. This is unique to the Eastern culture because it is rarely mentioned with the Western culture when discussing the possibility of dreams and religion. The only time Western writers talk of dreamless sleep is when referencing Hindu or Buddhist contexts. This Eastern viewpoint gives a unique insight on how practices in Buddhist circles can be contextualized. This dreamless sleep as mentioned prior is part of Tibetan Buddhism practice of achieving a particular mental state before going into sleep. They describe this experience as such of having visions and they require some visual criteria to be present for dreamless sleep to be achieved. Its highest form of praise is that it gives practical guidelines for the practicing Buddhist and their progress in meditation.

==== Islam ====
The Muslim society believes different forms of dreaming can help people come into contact with past martyrs of their faith. Their purpose is to give the dreamer full understanding of the martyr's existence and implications towards the future. Different examples of how dreams can affect the future of Muslims include but are not limited to: showing a prosperous future, motivate them into moral or spiritual development and warning them of impending dangers. Decisions made by Muslims can be as important as deciding a future spouse can be determined through one particular dream. The ultimate purpose behind these dreams is to give the devout Muslim a deeper insight into the truth that is not available in waking reality.
