= John Milton Roberts =

American anthropologist (1916–1990)

John M. Roberts (December 8, 1916 – April 2, 1990) was an American anthropologist who developed the field of expressive culture in a series of studies on games in culture, and published over 50 articles on these subjects. His complete list of publications can be found in the biography by Goodenough (1995). His 1964 article marked the first anthropological view of distributed cognition through the social organization of a community, looking at how information moves through the people in society.

== Bibliography ==
- Roberts, John. M. (1964). "The Self-Management of Cultures". In Ward H., Goodenough (ed.). Explorations in Cultural Anthropology. New York: McGraw Hill.
- Roberts, John. M. (1987). "Explorations in Cultural Anthropology". American Behavioral Scientist. 31 (2): 266–279. doi:10.1177/000276487031002010. S2CID 145653661. (contains a complete bibliography).
- John Milton Roberts and Michael L. Forman (1991) Riddles: Expressive Models of Interrogation. Directions in Sociolinguistics: The Ethnography of Communication, Eds., John Gumperz, Dell Hymes. Hoboken, NJ: Wiley. Reprinted from 1971 Ethnology 10(4):509-533.

== See also ==
- Distributed cognition
