= Distributed cognition =

Psychologic theory

Distributed cognition is an approach to cognitive science research that was developed by cognitive anthropologist Edwin Hutchins during the 1990s.

Hutchins argues that mental representations, which classical cognitive science held are within the individual brain, are actually distributed in sociocultural systems that constitute the tools to think and perceive the world. Thus, an individual can perceive the specific environment and organize his perceptions following typical mental representations of his sociocultural system. According to Hutchins, cognition involves not only the brain but also external artifacts, work teams made up of several people, and cultural systems for interpreting reality (mythical, scientific, or otherwise). Hutchins' distributed cognition theory explains mental processes by taking as the fundamental unit of analysis "a collection of individuals and artifacts and their relations to each other in a particular work practice". Distributed cognition theory is part of the interdisciplinary field of embodied cognitive science, also called embodied cognition.

Hutchins' distributed cognition theory influenced philosopher Andy Clark, who shortly after proposed his own version of the theory, calling it "extended cognition" (see, for example, the paper The Extended Mind).

== Scope ==
"DCog" is a specific approach to distributed cognition (distinct from other meanings) which takes a computational perspective towards goal-based activity systems.

The distributed cognition approach uses insights from cultural anthropology, sociology, embodied cognitive science, and the psychology of Lev Vygotsky (cf. cultural-historical psychology). It emphasizes the ways that cognition is off-loaded into the environment through social and technological means. This framework involves the coordination between individuals, artifacts and the environment.

According to Zhang & Norman (1994), the distributed cognition approach has three key components:

1. Embodiment of information that is embedded in representations of interaction
2. Coordination of enaction among embodied agents
3. Ecological contributions to a cognitive ecosystem

DCog studies the "propagation of representational states across media". Mental content is considered to be non-reducible to individual cognition and is more properly understood as off-loaded and extended into the environment, where information is also made available to other agents (Heylighen, Heath, & Overwalle, 2003). It is often understood as an approach in specific opposition to earlier and still prevalent "brain in a vat" models which ignore "situatedness, embodiment and enaction" as key to any cognitive act (Ibid.).

These representation-based frameworks consider distributed cognition as "a cognitive system whose structures and processes are distributed between internal and external representations, across a group of individuals, and across space and time". In general terms, they consider a distributed cognition system to have two components: internal and external representations. In their description, internal representations are knowledge and structure in individuals' minds while external representations are knowledge and structure in the external environment (Zhang, 1997b; Zhang and Norman, 1994).

DCog studies the ways that memories, facts, or knowledge is embedded in the objects, individuals, and tools in our environment.

These interactions can be categorized into three distinct types of processes:

1. Cognitive processes may be distributed across the members of a social group.
2. Cognitive processes may be distributed in the sense that the operation of the cognitive system involves coordination between internal and external (material or environmental) structure.
3. Processes may be distributed through time in such a way that the products of earlier events can transform the nature of related events.

== Research ==
John Milton Roberts thought that social organization could be seen as cognition through a community (Roberts 1964). He described the cognitive aspects of a society by looking at the present information and how it moves through the people in the society.

Daniel L. Schwartz (1978) proposed a distribution of cognition through culture and the distribution of beliefs across the members of a society.

In 1985, researcher Dan Sperber introduced an epidemiological approach to the distribution of cultural representations. Later, Romney, Weller, and Batchelder (1986) established the quantitative model for Cultural consensus.

In 1998, Mark Perry from Brunel University London explored the problems and the benefits brought by distributed cognition to "understanding the organisation of information within its contexts." He considered that distributed cognition draws from the information processing metaphor of cognitive science where a system is considered in terms of its inputs and outputs and tasks are decomposed into a problem space. He believed that information should be studied through the representation within the media or artifact that represents the information. Cognition is said to be "socially distributed" when it is applied to demonstrate how interpersonal processes can be used to coordinate activity within a social group.

In 1997, Gavriel Salomon stated that there were two classes of distributive cognition: shared cognition and off-loading. Shared cognition is that which is shared among people through common activity such as conversation where there is a constant change of cognition based on the other person's responses. An example of off-loading would be using a calculator to do arithmetic or creating a grocery list when going shopping. In that sense, the cognitive duties are off-loaded to a material object.

Later, John Sutton (2006) defined five appropriate domains of investigation for research in Dcog:

1. External cultural tools, artifacts, and symbol systems.
2. Natural environmental resources.
3. Interpersonal and social distribution or scaffolding.
4. Embodied capacities and skills.
5. Internalized cognitive artifacts.

In 2024, Latvian professor Igor Val Danilov proposed a new era in research on distributed cognition by introducing the Mother-Fetus Neurocognitive Model. It explains how the mother's body properties shape fetal cognition.

== Origin ==
In ontogenesis, the first act of the mental representation distribution succeeds in the mother-child dyad that constitutes in the child the tools to think and perceive the world. Based on evidence in hyperscanning research and psychophysiological research studies, Research Professor Igor Val Danilov developed the Shared intentionality notion first introduced by Professor of psychology Michael Tomasello. According to the hypothesis, the mother distributes the mental representation to the child to teach the young nervous system how to respond to environmental changes correctly. Due to this ecological learning, the child grasps the perception of objects and begins to cognize the environment at the simple reflexes stage of development without communication and abstract thinking. According to Igor Val Danilov, Shared intentionality switches on cognition in the child beginning from the embryonal period. At the beginning of life, the fetal environment is a cacophony of stimuli: electromagnetic waves, chemical interactions, and pressure fluctuations. Therefore, the fetal perception is limited. Since the relevant stimulus cannot overcome the noise level when it passes through the senses, a too-high noise threshold leads to the binding problem. While very young organisms need to integrate stimuli to combine objects, background, and abstract or emotional features into a single experience for building a representation of the surrounding reality, they cannot distinguish relevant sensory stimuli independently to integrate them into object representations. The mother-fetus neurocognitive model explains how the properties of the mother's heart (electromagnetic and acoustic oscillations) shape an ensemble of neuronal activity across both nervous systems. During the mother's intentional acts with her environment (the acoustic environment is shared with the fetus in a low-frequency sound band), the brainwave entrainment provides clues to the fetus's nervous system, binding neuronal activity with relevant stimuli.

== Applications ==
The application area of DCog is systems design and implementation in specific work environments. Its main method is field research, going into the workplace and making rigorous observations, e.g. through capturing work performances with video, studying and coding the recorded activities using qualitative research methods to codify the various ways in which cognition is distributed in the local environment, through the social and technical systems with which the workers engage.

Distributed cognition as a theory of learning, i.e. one in which the development of knowledge is attributed to the system of thinking agents interacting dynamically with artifacts, has been widely applied in the field of distance learning, especially in relation to computer-supported collaborative learning (CSCL) and other computer-supported learning tools. For example, in the field of teaching English Composition, Kevin LaGrandeur has argued that CSCL provides a source of common memory, collaborative space, and a cognitive artifact (tool to enhance cognition) that allows students to more easily build effective written compositions via explicit and implicit machine-human collaboration. Distributed cognition illustrates the process of interaction between people and technologies in order to determine how to best represent, store and provide access to digital resources and other artifacts.

Collaborative tagging on the World Wide Web is one of the most recent developments in technological support for distributed cognition. Beginning in 2004 and quickly becoming a standard on websites, collaborative tagging allows users to upload or select materials (e.g. pictures, music files, texts, websites) and associate tags with these materials. Tags can be chosen freely, and are similar to keywords. Other users can then browse through tags; a click on a tag connects a user to similarly tagged materials. Tags furthermore enable tag clouds, which graphically represent the popularity of tags, demonstrating co-occurrence relations between tags and thus jump from one tag to another.

Dcog has also been used to understand learning and communication in clinical settings and to obtain an integrated view of clinical workplace learning. It has been observed how medical actors use and connect gestural practices, along with visual and haptic structures of their own bodies and of artifacts such as technological instruments and computational devices. In so doing they co-construct complex, multimodal representations that go beyond the mental representations usually studied from a cognitive perspective of learning.

Distributed cognition can also be seen through cultures and communities. Learning certain habits or following certain traditions is seen as cognition distributed over a group of people. Exploring distributed cognition through community and culture is one way to understand how it may work.

With the new research that is emerging in this field, the concept of distributed cognition provides a framework for examining interactions between individual human beings and artifacts such as technologies and complex external environments. This concept has been applied to educational research in the areas of distributed leadership and distributed instruction.

Distributed cognition between internal and external processing has also been used to study problem-solving and Bayesian reasoning. For example, it has been observed that the use of external manipulable materials such as cards and tokens can help improve performance and reduce cognitive bias such as the base-rate fallacy, even among adult problem-solvers, as long as they physically interact with these artefacts. It has also been reported that interacting with tokens can reduce the impact of mathematical anxiety on mental calculation performance and supports insight although the evidence is mixed with regards to the impact of distributing cognition between internal and external processing with regards to insight.

The progress in research on the mother-fetus neurocognitive model reveals perspectives to a wide range of applications from natural neurostimulation-based therapies to noninvasive Brain-Computer Interfaces.

== Metaphors and examples ==
Distributed cognition is seen when using paper and pencil to do a complicated arithmetic problem. The person doing the problem may talk with a friend to clarify the problem, and then must write the partial answers on the paper in order to be able to keep track of all the steps in the calculation. In this example, the parts of distributed cognition are seen in:

- setting up the problem, in collaboration with another person,
- performing manipulation/arithmetic procedures, both in one's head and by writing down resulting partial answers.

The process of working out the answer requires not only the perception and thought of two people, it also requires the use of a tool (paper) to extend an individual's memory. So the intelligence is distributed, both between people, and a person and an object.

Another well-researched site for analyzing distributed cognition and applying the discovered insights towards the design of more optimal systems is aviation, where both cockpits and air traffic control environments have been studied as scenes that technologically and socially distribute cognition through systems of externalized representational media. It is not the cognitive performance and expertise of any one single person or machine that is important for the continued operation or the landing and takeoff of airplanes. The cognition is distributed over the personnel, sensors, and machinery both in the plane and on the ground, including but not limited to the controllers, pilots and crew as a whole.

Hutchins also examined another scene of distributed cognition within the context of navigating a US navy vessel. In his book on USS Palau, he explains in detail how distributed cognition is manifested through the interaction between crew members as they interpret, process, and transform information into various representational states in order to safely navigate the ship. In this functional unit, crew members (e.g. pelorus operators, bearing takers, plotters, and the ship's captain) play the role of actors who transform information into different representational states (i.e. triangulation, landmark sightings, bearings, and maps). In this context, navigation is embodied through the combined efforts of actors in the functional unit.

In his study on process, representation and task world, Mark Perry demonstrated how distributed cognition analysis can be conducted in a field study. His example was design analysis in Civil engineering. In this work, he showed how an information processing approach can be applied by carrying a detailed analysis of the background of the study - goals and resources, inputs and outputs, representations and processes, and transformational activity, "how information was transformed from the design drawings and site onto tables of measurements (different representations)" and then onto "a graphical representation" which provided a clearer demonstration of the relationship between the two data sets.

== Quotes ==
On educational psychology:

People think in conjunction and partnership with others and with the help of culturally provided tools and implements.

— Salomon, 1997 p. xiii

On cognitive science:

Nervous systems do not form representations of the world, they can only form representations of interactions with the world.

The emphasis on finding and describing "knowledge structures" that are somewhere "inside" the individual encourages us to overlook the fact that human cognition is always situated in a complex sociocultural world and cannot be unaffected by it.

— Hutchins, 1995 p. xiii

== See also ==
- Activity theory
- Civic intelligence
- Collaborative innovation networks
- Collective intelligence
- Distributed language
- Distributed leadership
- Education
- Extended mind
- Collective consciousness
- Global brain
- List of thought processes
- Language
- Situated cognition
- Social cognition
- Standing on the shoulders of giants
