= Civic intelligence =

Intelligence devoted to public issues

Civic intelligence is an "intelligence" that is devoted to addressing public or civic issues. The term has been applied to individuals and, more commonly, to collective bodies, like organizations, institutions, or societies. Civic intelligence can be used in politics by groups of people who are trying to achieve a common goal. Social movements and political engagement in history might have been partly involved with collective thinking and civic intelligence. Education, in its multiple forms, has helped some countries to increase political awareness and engagement by amplifying the civic intelligence of collaborative groups. Increasingly, artificial intelligence and social media, modern innovations of society, are being used by many political entities and societies to tackle problems in politics, the economy, and society at large.

This image is a good illustration of the collective effort and intelligence that people have in formulating internet right solutions.

== The concept ==
Like the term social capital, civic intelligence has been used independently by several people since the beginning of the 20th century. Although there has been little or no direct contact between the various authors, the different meanings associated with the term are generally complementary to each other.

The first usage identified was made in 1902 by Samuel T. Dutton, Superintendent of Teachers College Schools on the occasion of the dedication of the Horace Mann School when it noted that "increasing civic intelligence" is a "true purpose of education in this country." More recently, in 1985, David Mathews, president of the Kettering Foundation, wrote an article entitled Civic Intelligence in which he discussed the decline of civic engagement in the United States.

A still more recent version is Douglas Schuler's "Cultivating Society's Civic Intelligence: Patterns for a New 'World Brain'". In Schuler's version, civic intelligence is applied to groups of people because that is the level where public opinion is formed and decisions are made or at least influenced. It applies to groups, formal or informal, who are working towards civic goals such as environmental amelioration or non-violence among people. This version is related to many other concepts that are currently receiving a great deal of attention including collective intelligence, civic engagement, participatory democracy, emergence, new social movements, collaborative problem-solving, and Web 2.0.

When Schuler developed the Liberating Voices pattern language for communication revolution, he made civic intelligence the first of 136 patterns.

Civic intelligence is similar to John Dewey's "cooperative intelligence" or the "democratic faith" that asserts that "each individual has something to contribute, and the value of each contribution can be assessed only as it entered into the final pooled intelligence constituted by the contributions of all". Civic intelligence is implicitly invoked by the subtitle of Jared Diamond's 2004 book, Collapse: Why Some Societies Choose to Fail or Succeed and to the question posed in Thomas Homer-Dixon's 2000 book Ingenuity Gap: How Can We Solve the Problems of the Future? that suggests civic intelligence will be needed if humankind is to stave off problems related to climate change and other potentially catastrophic occurrences. With these meanings, civic intelligence is less a phenomenon to be studied and more of a dynamic process or tool to be shaped and wielded by individuals or groups. Civic intelligence, according to this logic, can affect how society is built and how groups or individuals can utilize it as a tool for collective thinking or action. Civic intelligence sometimes involves large groups of people, but other times it involves only a few individuals. civic intelligence might be more evidently seen in smaller groups when compared to bigger groups due to more intimate interactions and group dynamics.

Robert Putnam, who is largely responsible for the widespread consideration of "social capital", has written that social innovation often occurs in response to social needs. This resonates with George Basalla's findings related to technological innovation, which simultaneously facilitates and responds to social innovation. The concept of "civic intelligence," an example of social innovation, is a response to a perceived need. The reception that it receives or doesn't receive will be in proportion to its perceived need by others. Thus, social needs serve as causes for social innovation and collective civic intelligence.

Civic intelligence focuses on the role of civil society and the public for several reasons. At a minimum, the public's input is necessary to ratify important decisions made by business or government. Beyond that, however, civil society has originated and provided the leadership for a number of vital social movements. Any inquiry into the nature of civic intelligence is also collaborative and participatory. Civic intelligence is inherently multi-disciplinary and open-ended. Cognitive scientists address some of these issues in the study of "distributed cognition." Social scientists study aspects of it with their work on group dynamics, democratic theory, social systems, and many other subfields. The concept is important in business literature ("organizational learning") and in the study of "epistemic communities" (scientific research communities, notably).

== Civic intelligence and politics ==
Politically, civic intelligence brings people together to form collective thoughts or ideas to solve political problems. Historically, Jane Addams was an activist who reformed Chicago's cities in terms of housing immigrants, hosting lecture events on current issues, building the first public playground, and conducting research on cultural and political elements of communities around her. She is just one example of how civic intelligence can influence society. Historical movements in America such as those related to human rights, the environment, and economic equity have been started by ordinary citizens, not by governments or businesses. To achieve changes in these topics, people of different backgrounds come together to solve both local and global issues. Another example of civic intelligence is how governments in 2015 came together in Paris to formulate a plan to curb greenhouse gas emission and alleviate some effects of global warming.

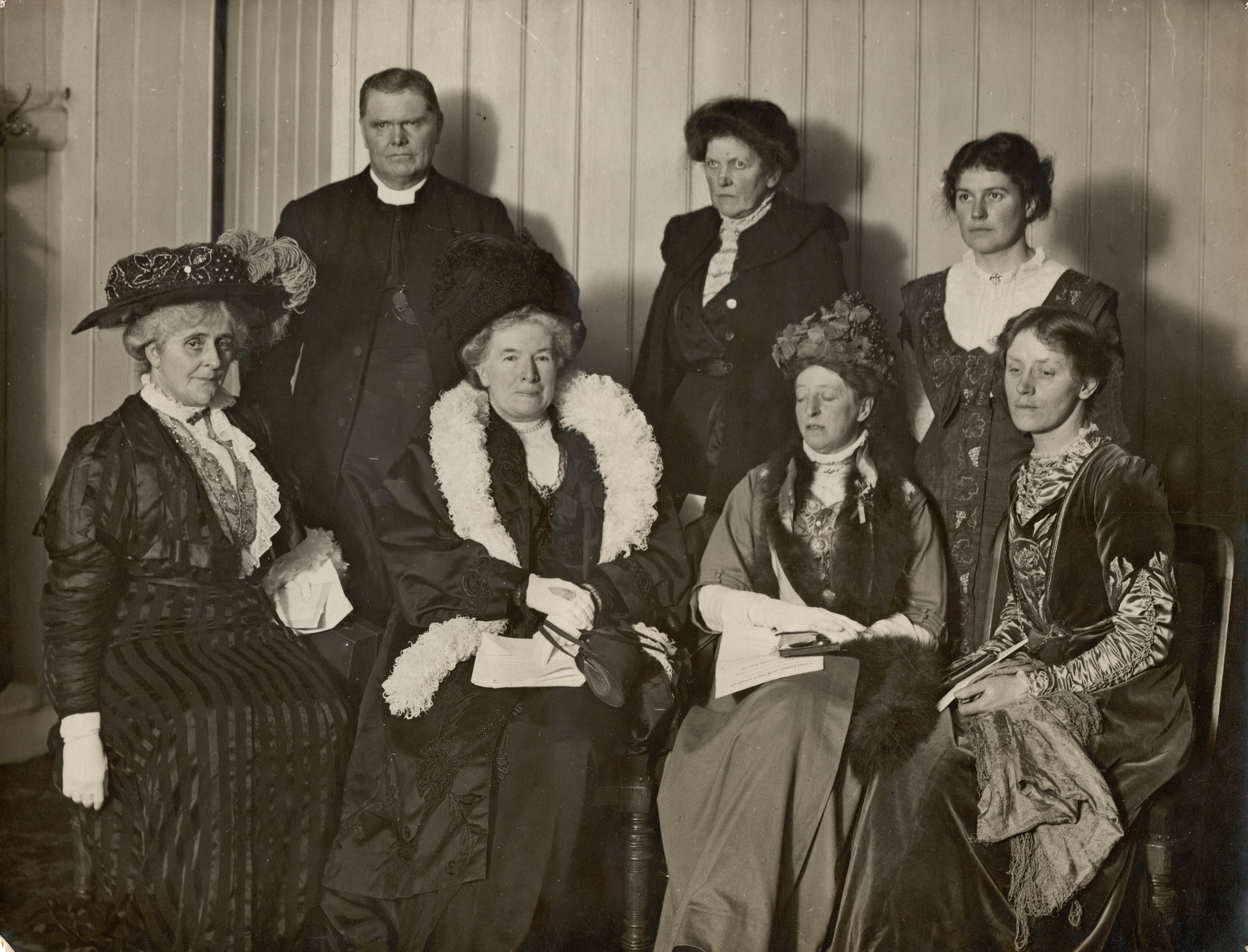
Group that debated women suffrage in Free Trade Hall, Manchester

Politically, no atlas of civic intelligence exists, yet the quantity and quality of examples worldwide is enormous. While a comprehensive "atlas" is not necessarily a goal, people are currently developing online resources to record at least some small percentage of these efforts. The rise in the number of transnational advocacy networks, the coordinated worldwide demonstrations protesting the invasion of Iraq, and the World Social Forums that provided "free space" for thousands of activists from around the world, all support the idea that civic intelligence is growing. Although smaller in scope, efforts like the work of the Friends of Nature group to create a "Green Map" of Beijing are also notable.

Political engagement of citizens sometimes comes from the collective intelligence of engaging local communities through political education. Tradition examples of political engagement includes voting, discussing issues with neighbors and friends, working for a political campaign, attending rallies, forming political action groups, etc. Today, social and economic scientists such as Jason Corburn and Elinor Ostrom continue to analyze how people come together to achieve collective goals such as sharing natural resources, combating diseases, formulating political action plans, and preserving the natural environment.

From one study, the author suggests that it might be helpful for educational facilities such as colleges or even high schools to educate students on the importance of civic intelligence in politics so that better choices could be made when tackling societal issues through a collective citizen intelligence. Harry C. Boyte, in an article he wrote, argues that schools serve as a sort of "free space" for students to engage in community engagement efforts as describe above. Schools, according to Boyte, empower people to take actions in their communities, thus rallying increasing number of people to learn about politics and form political opinions. He argues that this chain reaction is what then leads to civic intelligence and the collective effort to solve specific problems in local communities. It is shown by one study that citizens who are more informed and more attentive to the world of politics around them are more politically engaged both at the local and national level. One study, aggregating the results of 70 articles about political awareness, finds that political awareness is important in the onset of citizen participation and voicing opinion. In recent years and the modern world, there is a shift in how citizens stay informed and become attentive to the political world. Although traditional political engagement methods are still being used by most individuals, particularly older people, there is a trend shifting towards social media and the internet in terms of political engagement and civic intelligence.

== Economics and civic engagement ==
Civic intelligence is involved in economic policymaking and decision-making around the world. According to one article, community members in Olympia, Washington worked with local administrations and experts on affordable housing improvements in the region. This collaboration utilized the tool of civic intelligence. In addition, the article argues that nonprofit organizations can facilitate local citizen participation in discussions about economic issues such as public housing, wage rates, etc. In Europe, according to RSA's report on Citizens' Economic Council, democratic participation and discussions have positive impacts on economic issues in society such as poverty, housing situations, the wage gap, healthcare, education, food availability, etc. The report emphasizes citizen empowerment, clarity and communication, and building legitimacy around economic development. The RSA's economic council is working towards enforcing more crowdsourced economic ideas and increasing the expertise level of fellows who will advise policymakers on engaging citizens in the economy. The report argues that increasing citizen engagement makes governments more legitimate through increased public confidence, stockholder engagement, and government political commitment. Ideas such as creating citizen juries, citizen reference panels, and the devolution process of policymaking are explored in more depth in the report. Collective civic intelligence is seen as a tool by the RSA to improve economic issues in society.

Globally, civic participation and intelligence interact with the needs of businesses and governments. One study finds that increased local economic concentration is correlated with decreased levels of civic engagement because citizen's voices are covered up by the needs of corporations. In this situation, governments overvalue the needs of big corporations when compared to the needs of groups of individual citizens. This study points out that corporations can negatively impact civic intelligence if citizens are not given enough freedom to voice their opinions regarding economic issues. The study shows that the US has faced civic disengagement in the past three decades due to monopolizations of opinions by corporations. On the other hand, if a government supports local capitalism and civic engagement equally, there might be beneficial socioeconomic outcomes such as more income equality, less poverty, and less unemployment. The article adds that in a period of global development, local forces of civic intelligence and innovation will likely benefit citizen's lives and distinguish one region from another in terms of socioeconomic status. The concept of civic health is introduced by one study as a key component to the wellbeing of local or national economy. According to the article, civic engagement can increase citizens's professional employment skills, foster a sense of trust in communities, and allow a greater amount of community investment from citizens themselves.

== Artificial intelligence ==
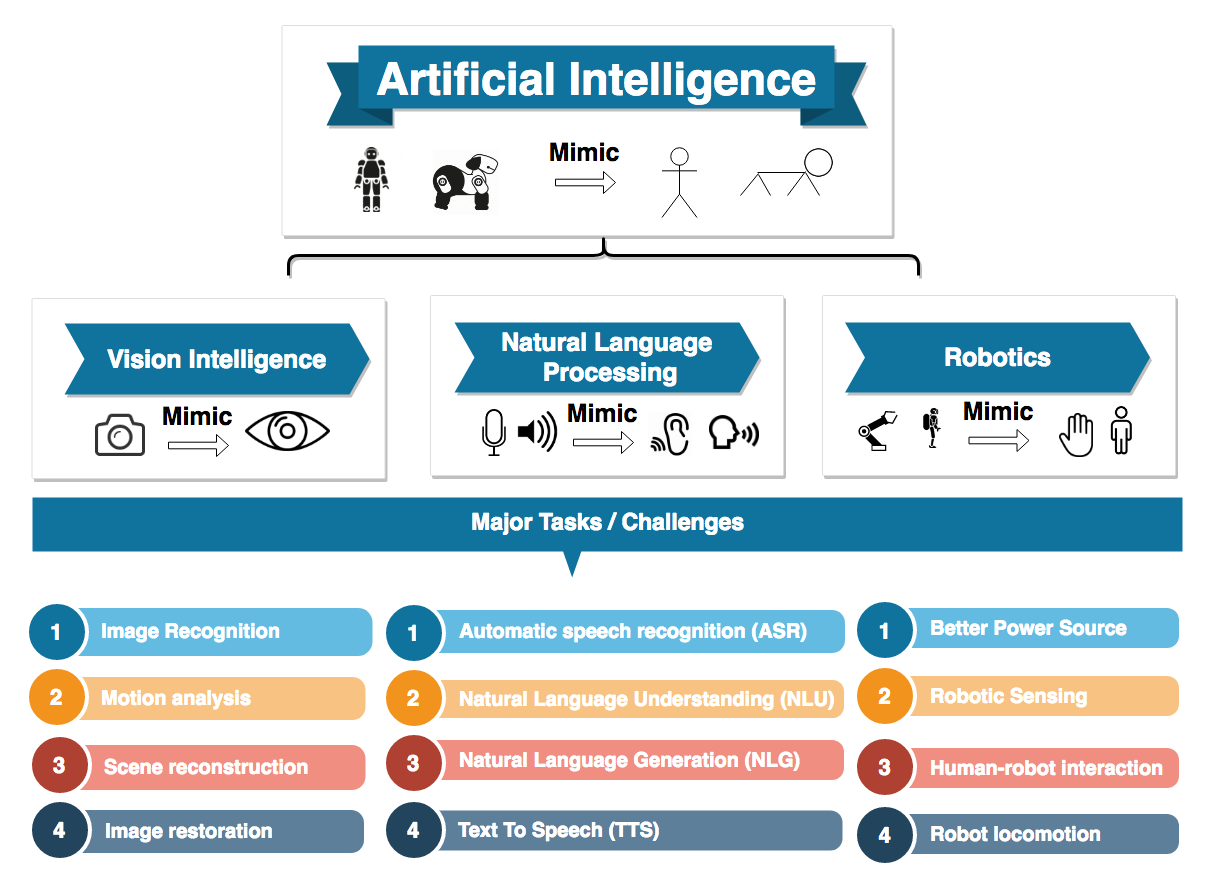
This image shows various categories of AI and major tasks.

One recent prominent example of civic intelligence in the modern world is the creation and improvements of artificial intelligence. According to one article, AI enables people to propose solutions, communicate with each other more effectively, obtain data for planning, and tackle society issues from across the world. In 2018, at the second annual AI for Good Global summit, industry leaders, policymakers, research scientists, AI enthusiasts all came together to formulate plans and ideas regarding how to use artificial intelligence to solve modern society issues, including political problems in countries of different backgrounds. The summit proposed ideas regarding how AI can benefit safety, health, and city governance. The article mentions that in order for artificial intelligence to achieve effective use in society, researchers, policymakers, community members, and technology companies all need to work together to improve artificial intelligence. With this logic, it takes coordinated civic intelligence to make artificial intelligence work.

There are some shortcomings to artificial intelligence. According to one report, AI is increasingly being used by governments to limit civil freedom of citizens through authoritarian regimes and restrictive regulations. Technology and the use of automated systems are used by powerful governments to dismiss civic intelligence. There is also the concern for losing civic intelligence and human jobs if AI was to replace many sectors of the economy and political landscapes around the world. AI has the dangerous possibility of getting out of control and self-replicate destructive behaviors that might be detrimental to society.

However, according to one article, if world communities work together to form international standards, improve AI regulation policies, and educate people about AI, political and civil freedom might be more easily achieved.

== Social media ==
Recent shifts towards modern technology, social media, and the internet influence how civic intelligence interact with politics in the world. New technologies expand the reach of data and information to more people, and citizens can engage with each other or the government more openly through the internet. Civic intelligence can take a form of increased presence among groups of individuals, and the speed of civic intelligence onset is intensified as well.

The internet and social media play roles in civic intelligence. Social Medias like Facebook, Twitter, and Reddit became popular sites for political discoveries, and many people, especially younger adults, choose to engage with politics online. There are positive effects of social media on civic engagement. According to one article, social media has connected people in unprecedented ways. People now find it easier to form democratic movements, engage with each other and politicians, voice opinions, and take actions virtually. Social media has been incorporated into people's lives, and many people obtain news and other political ideas from online sources.

One study explains that social media increase political participation through more direct forms of democracy and bottom-up approach of solving political, social, or economical issues. The idea is that social media will lead people to participate politically in novel ways other than traditional actions of voting, attending rallies, and supporting candidates in real life. The study argues that this leads to new ways of enacting civic intelligence and political participation. Thus, the study points out that social media is designed to gather civic intelligence at one place, the internet. A third article featuring an Italian case study finds that civic collaboration is important in helping a healthy government function in both local and national communities. The article explains that there seems to be more individualized political actions and efforts when people choose to innovate new ways of political participation. Thus, one group's actions of political engagement might be entirely different than those of another group.

However, social media also has some negative effects on civic intelligence in politics or economics. One study explains that even though social media might have increased direct citizen participation in politics and economics, it might have also opened more room for misinformation and echo chambers. More specifically, trolling, the spread of false political information, stealing of person data, and usage of bots to spread propaganda are all examples of negative consequences of internet and social media. These negative results, along the lines of the article, influence civic intelligence negatively because citizens have trouble discovering the lies from the truths in the political arena. Thus, civic intelligence would either be misleading or vanish altogether if a group is using false sources or misleading information. A second article points out that a filter bubble is created through group isolation as a result of group polarization. False information and deliberate deception of political agendas play a major role in forming filter bubbles of citizens. People are conditioned to believe what they want to believe, so citizens who focus more on one-sided political news might form one's own filter bubble. Next, a research journal found that Twitter increases political knowledge of users while Facebook decrease the political knowledge of users. The journal points out that different social media platforms can affect users differently in terms of political awareness and civic intelligence. Thus, social media might have uncertain political effects on civic intelligence.
