= Consciousness and Cognition =

- Discipline: Consciousness studies
- Language: English
- Edited by: Talis Bachmann

Publication details
- Publisher: Elsevier
- Frequency: 10/year
- Impact factor: 2.444 (2020)

Standard abbreviations
- ISO 4: Conscious. Cogn.

Indexing
- CODEN: COCOF9
- ISSN: 1053-8100 (print); 1090-2376 (web)
- OCLC no.: 22646776

Links
- Journal homepage

The journal Consciousness and Cognition provides a forum for scientific approaches to the issues of consciousness, voluntary control, and self. The journal was launched by Bernard Baars and William Banks.

The journal's editor-in-chief positions were held by Bernard Baars, late William Banks and late Bruce Bridgeman. Currently the editorial team includes Gregory Francis, Stephanie Goodhew, J. Timothy Lane, Michael A. Pitts, Antti Revonsuo, Devin Terhune, and Talis Bachmann (editor-in-chief).
