= Devin Terhune =

Neuroscientist

- Education: Concordia University; University of Liverpool; Lund University; University of Oxford
- Known for: Neurocognitive bases of suggestion Variable states of consciousness Depersonalization; Metacognition
- Scientific career
- Fields: Cognitive Neuroscience; Experimental Psychology; Psychiatry
- Workplaces: King's College London
- Doctoral advisor: Etzel Cardeña

Devin B. Terhune is a cognitive neuroscientist, a Reader (Associate Professor) at King's College London, director of its TAS Laboratory and frequent public speaker. He is primarily known for his work on suggestion, time perception, hypnosis, and different features of awareness, as well as his public lectures on these subjects.

His contributions to the field of neuroscience have earned him a number of awards, grants, and honors from the BBSRC, the Bial Foundation, the Cogito Foundation, the European Commission, the Gyllenbergs Foundation, and the Templeton Foundation. His research has also been covered by major national and international news outlets such as the New York Times, The Guardian, New Scientist, ABC News, and Science Magazine.

== Biography ==
Terhune began his academic career by obtaining a bachelor's degree in psychology and an honours degree in Philosophy from Concordia University in Montreal, Canada in 2003. He went on to obtain a master's degree in psychology from the University of Liverpool a year later, and then became a research assistant at Boston University's Department of Psychiatry.

Terhune left that position to begin a PhD in psychology from Lund University, which completed in 2010. He then became a postdoctoral research fellow at the University of Oxford's Department of Experimental Psychology, where he published notable papers on synesthesia working alongside Roi Cohen Kadosh.

From 2015 to 2022, he lectured in statistics and coding at Goldsmiths, University of London. As of 2022, Terhune is a Reader at King's College London, heads the institution's Timing Awareness and Suggestion Laboratory. During his time, he has increased his public outreach, both by authoring articles in various publications and giving numerous public lectures.

== Selected publications ==
Devin Terhune has an extensive publication record. A selection of works are listed below:

Streeter, Chris C.; Jensen, J. Eric; Perlmutter, Ruth M.; Cabral, Howard J.; Tian, Hua; Terhune, Devin B.; Ciraulo, Domenic A.; Renshaw, Perry F. (May 2007). "Yoga Asana Sessions Increase Brain GABA Levels: A Pilot Study". The Journal of Alternative and Complementary Medicine. 13 (4): 419–426. doi:10.1089/acm.2007.6338. ISSN 1075-5535. PMID 17532734.

Streeter, Chris C; Terhune, Devin B; Whitfield, Theodore H; Gruber, Staci; Sarid-Segal, Ofra; Silveri, Marisa M; Tzilos, Golfo; Afshar, Maryam; Rouse, Elizabeth D; Tian, Hua; Renshaw, Perry F (March 2008). "Performance on the Stroop Predicts Treatment Compliance in Cocaine-Dependent Individuals". Neuropsychopharmacology. 33 (4): 827–836. doi:10.1038/sj.npp.1301465. ISSN 0893-133X. PMID 17568399.

Terhune, Devin Blair; Tai, Sarah; Cowey, Alan; Popescu, Tudor; Cohen Kadosh, Roi (December 2011). "Enhanced Cortical Excitability in Grapheme-Color Synesthesia and Its Modulation". Current Biology. 21 (23): 2006–2009. Bibcode:2011CBio...21.2006T. doi:10.1016/j.cub.2011.10.032. PMC 3242051. PMID 22100060.
