= Metadesign =

Conceptual framework and methodology

Metadesign (or meta-design) is an emerging conceptual framework aimed at defining and creating social, economic and technical infrastructures in which new forms of collaborative design can take place. It consists of a series of practical design-related tools for achieving this.

As a methodology, its aim is to nurture emergence of the previously unthinkable as possibilities or prospects through the collaboration of designers within interdisciplinarity 'metadesign' teams. Inspired by the way living systems work, this new field aims to help improve the way we feed, clothe, shelter, assemble, communicate and live together.

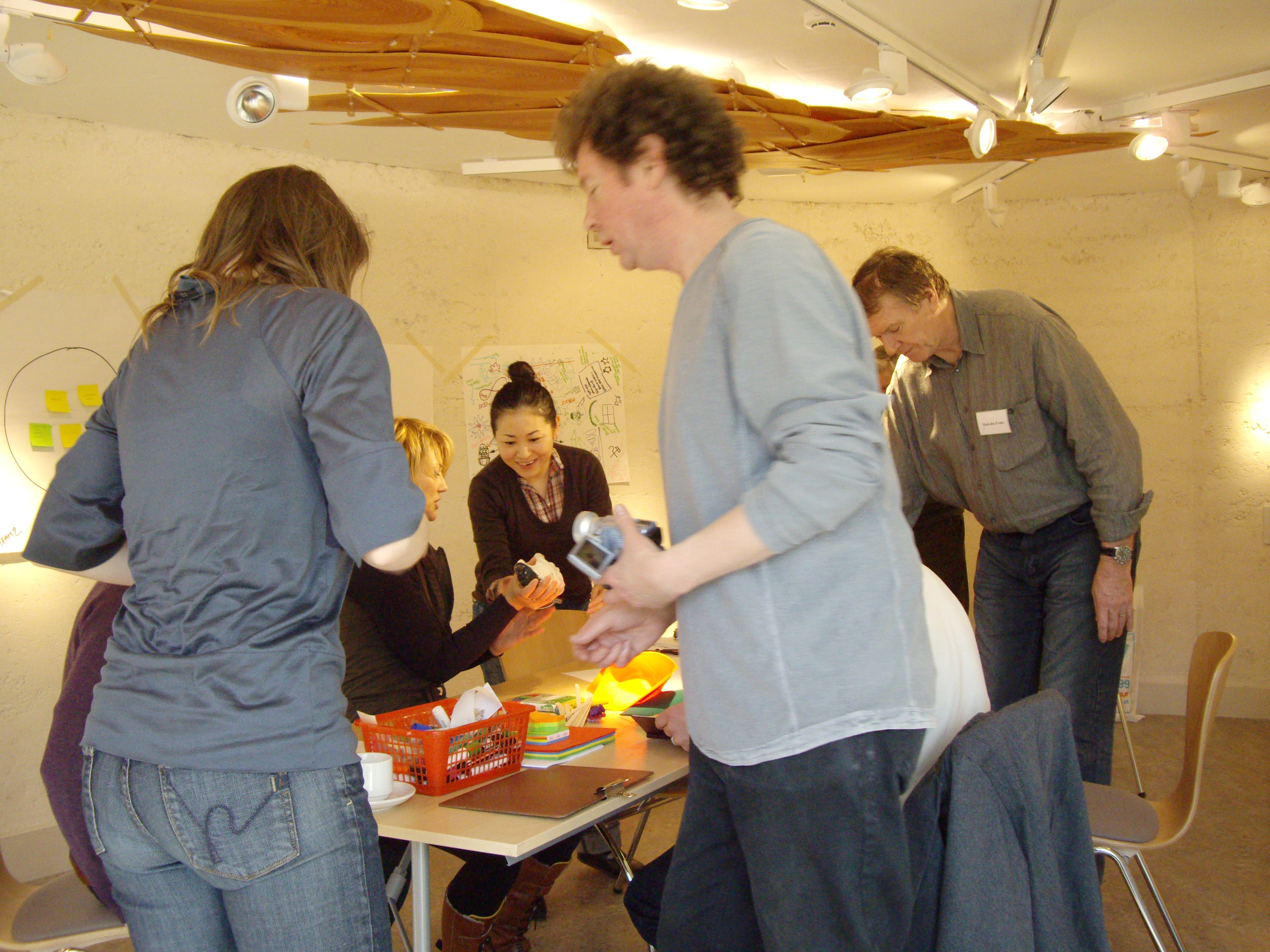
Team members working in a metadesign workshop organized by researchers at Goldsmiths, University of London (2008)

== History ==
Metadesign has been initially put forward as an industrial design approach to complexity theory and information systems by Dutch designer Andries Van Onck in 1963, while at Ulm School of Design (later at Politecnico di Milano and Rome and Florence ISIA). Since then, several different design, creative and research approaches have used the name "Metadesign", ranging from Humberto Maturana and Francisco Varela's biological approach, to Gerhard Fischer's and Elisa Giaccardi's techno-social approach, and Paul Virilio's techno-policital approach.

Later on, a group was present at Politecnico di Milano, and several different universities and graduate programs began applying Metadesign in design teaching around the world generally based at Van Onck's approach, further developed at Politecnico di Milano.

More recently, some efforts have been made to systematize Metadesign as a structured creative process, such as (1) Fischer's and Giaccardi's and (2) Caio Vassão's academic works, among several others, based on a much wider reference frame, ranging from post-structuralist philosophy, Neil Postman's media ecology, Christopher Alexander's pattern languages and deep ecology.

This variety of approaches is justified by the myriad interpretations that can be derived from the etymological structure of the term.

== Re-designing design ==
The Greek word 'meta' originally meant 'beyond' or 'after' and is now sometimes used to imply a comprehensive, insightful self-awareness. Employed as a prefix, it explicitly denotes self-referentiality. Metadesign, therefore, alludes to a design practice that (re)designs itself (see Maturana and Varela's term autopoiesis). The idea of Metadesign acknowledges that future uses and problems cannot be completely anticipated at design time. Aristotle's influential theory of design defined it by saying that the 'cause' of design was its final state. This teleological perspective is similar to the orthodox idea of an economic payback at the point of sale, rather than successive stages when the product could be seen to achieve high levels of perceived value, throughout the whole design cycle. Some supporters of metadesign hope that it will extend the traditional notion of system design beyond the original development of a system by allowing users to become co-designers.

== The importance of languaging ==
By harnessing creative teamwork within a suitable co-design framework, some metadesigners have sought to catalyse changes at a behavioural level. However, as Albert Einstein said, "We can't solve problems by using the same kind of thinking we used when we created them". This points to a need for appropriate innovation at all levels, including the metaphorical language that serves to sustain a given paradigm. In practical terms this adds considerable complexity to the task of managing actions and outcomes. What may be so neatly described as 'new knowledge', in practical terms, exists as an interpersonal and somatic web of tacit knowledge that needs to be interpreted and applied by many collaborators. This tends to reduce the semantic certainty of roles, actions and descriptors within a given team, making it necessary to rename particular shared experiences that seem inappropriately defined. In other instances it may be necessary to invent new words to describe perceived gaps in what can be discussed within a prevailing vernacular. Humberto Maturana's work on distributed language and the field of biosemiotics is germane to this task. Some researchers have used bisociation in order to create an auspicious synergy of benign synergies. In aspiring to this outcome, metadesign teams will cultivate auspicious 'diversities-of-diversities'. It suggests that metadesign would offer a manifold ethical space. In this respect, related approaches include what Arthur Koestler (1967) called holarchy, or what John Dewey and John Chris Jones have called 'creative democracy'.

== Metadesign conceptual tools ==
Regarding a wide range of applications and contexts, Vassão has argued that Metadesign can be understood as a set of four "conceptual tools", utilizing Gilles Deleuze's understanding of the term "tool":

1. Levels of abstraction (the ability to understand the structure and limits of abstractions, language and instrumental thinking);
2. Diagrams and topology (the use of diagrammatic thinking and design, sustained by topological understanding);
3. Procedural design (the creation of realities through the use of procedures, such as in game and role playing, as well as in procedural design, art and architecture);
4. Emergence (the absence of absolute control, and the ability to take advantage of unintended and unforeseen results).

Vassão has argued that, in all different approaches to metadesign, the presence of these conceptual tools can be verified.

== See also ==
- Cybernetics
- Complex adaptive system
- Ecology
- Lateral thinking
- Systems thinking
