= Distributed language =

Concept in linguistics

Distributed language is a concept in linguistics that language is not an independent symbolic system used by individuals for communication but rather an array of behaviors that constitute human interaction. The concept of distributed language is based on a biological theory of the origin of language and the concept of distributed cognition.
