= Antti Revonsuo =

Finnish cognitive neuroscientist

Antti Revonsuo is a Finnish cognitive neuroscientist, psychologist, and philosopher of mind. His work seeks to understand consciousness as a biological phenomenon. He is one of a small number of philosophers running their own laboratories.

Currently, Revonsuo is a professor of cognitive neuroscience at the University of Skövde in Sweden and of psychology at the University of Turku in Finland. His work focuses on altered states of consciousness in general and dreaming in particular. He is best known for his Threat Simulation Theory, which – in the tradition of evolutionary psychology – states that dreams serve the biological function of rehearsing possibly threatening situations in order to aid survival, and his advocacy of the dreaming brain as a model of consciousness.

== Biography ==
Revonsuo completed his graduate education at the University of Turku, receiving his master's degree in Psychology in 1990, a Licentiate in Philosophy in 1991, and finally a Ph.D. in Psychology in 1995. Since 2003, he is a member of the Academy of Finland.

== Works ==
Revonsuo has himself written two books laying out his philosophical and scientific approach to consciousness: Inner Presence: Consciousness as a Biological Phenomenon (2006) and Consciousness: The Science of Subjectivity (2010).

In addition, Revonsuo has co-edited two books on consciousness: Consciousness in Philosophy and Cognitive Neuroscience (1994) and Beyond Dissociations: Interaction Between Dissociated Implicit and Explicit Processing (2000). He is also the European Editor of the journal Consciousness and Cognition.

=== Dreaming as a model of consciousness ===
According to Revonsuo, the dreaming brain is particularly suitable model system for the study of consciousness because it generates a conscious experience while being isolated from both sensory input and motor output. Regarding the rival paradigm of visual awareness, Revonsuo argues that it does not allow one to distinguish between consciousness and perception. Revonsuo holds that there is a "'double dissociation' between consciousness and perceptual input". Accordingly, dreams are conscious experiences, which occur without any perceptual stimuli, and, conversely, perceptual input does not automatically engender conscious experience. In support of the independence of consciousness from perception, Revonsuo cites Stephen LaBerge's case study on a lucid dreamer performing previously agreed upon eye movements to signal to the experimenters that he had become conscious of the fact that he was dreaming. A second study that supports Revonsuo's view of dreams was conducted by Allan Rechtschaffen and Foulkes (1965). In this study, subjects were made to sleep with their eyelids open, thus allowing the visual cortex to receive visual stimuli. Though their eyes were open, and the perceptual input was accessible, the subjects could not see the stimuli and did not report dreaming of it. It is the brain that is having the internal experience, independent of perceptual input. This internalist view of consciousness leads Revonsuo to compare both dreaming and waking consciousness with a virtual reality simulation decoupled from or only indirectly informed by a brain's external environment.

Philosophically, Revonsuo's claim that dreaming is a state of consciousness at all contradicts arguments propounded by philosophers Norman Malcolm and Daniel Dennett. Malcolm argues that, if a person is in any way conscious, "it logically follows that he is not sound asleep". Dennett suggested that we needed a well-confirmed, empirical theory of dreams before we could say whether dreams were like experiences or not.

=== Threat simulation theory ===
Revonsuo's threat simulation theory claims that much or all of dream experience is "specialized in the simulation of threatening events", for the evolutionary purpose of rehearsing fight or flight situations to better prepare for such instances in waking life (similar to a "fire drill"). According to Revonsuo, empiricial research supports this theory by showing the recurrence of threatening situations in dreaming: of all of the emotions experienced in dreaming, "fear [is] the most common and anger the next most common".

An otherwise supportive 2009 review of threat simulation theory stated that "The main weakness of the theory is that there is no direct evidence of the effect of dream rehearsal (or the lack of it) on performance or on survival rates across generations of ancestral humans", and also notes it is not clear why some threat simulations end without a reaction from the dreamer. The review finds that "Overall, the available new evidence and the new direct tests of the predictions of (threat simulation theory) yield strong support for the theory. A mass of evidence indicates that threat simulation is a function of dreaming, an evolved psychological adaptation selected for during the evolutionary history of our species. On current evidence, the strengths of the theory seem to outweigh its weaknesses."

According to a 2017 study in Sleep, an analysis of the statistical content of intelligible sleep-talking found that 24 percent contained negative content, 22 percent had "nasty" language, about 10 percent contained a variation of the word "no", and 10 percent contained profanity. 2.5 percent of the intelligible words were a variation of the word "fuck", which comprised only 0.003 percent of spoken words when awake. The study authors judged the findings as being consistent with threat simulation theory.

Cross-cultural surveys find that the most typical dream theme is that of being chased or attacked. Other common negative themes include falling, drowning, being lost, being trapped, being naked or otherwise inappropriately dressed in public, being accidentally injured/ill/dying, being in a human-made or natural disaster, poor performance (such as difficulty taking a test), and having trouble with transportation. Some themes are positive, such as sex, flying, or finding money, but these are less common than dreaming about threats.

Revonsuo outlines six “empirically testable” propositions (Revonsuo, 2000) to illustrate his "threat simulation" theory.

==== Proposition 1 ====
Dream experience embodies an “organized and selective simulation of the perceptual world.” Sensory modalities are fully integrated into perceptual dream experience, and the “active dream self” has a body image similar to that of the waking self in the “visuo-spatial world.” Dreams are composed of interactions that mimic archetypical wake-state experiences and situations with people and objects. Revonsuo states that dreams are the result of an “active and organized process rather than a passive by-product of disorganized activation.” The predicable organization of dreams renders them as more than “random noise”; rather, he views their function as a “selective simulation of the world.”

==== Proposition 2 ====
Representations of daily life experiences are absent while dreaming. Dreamers experience a “selective simulation of the world” biased towards threatening situations. The high proportion of negative emotions experienced while dreaming correlates to the need for “adaptive responses that increase the ability to respond appropriately in adaptively important situations” (Revonsuo, 2000). The misfortunes and aggression experienced in a dream state may act as a simulation that prepares the dreamer in the case that a similar situation may occur in the awake state. Evidence lies in the activation during REM sleep across regions that are necessary for the production of these emotionally charged experiences.

==== Proposition 3 ====
Real waking life experiences that are traumatic to the individual causes the dream-production system to create dream content that simulates responses to threats as a mechanism to "mark situations critical for physical survival and reproductive success." Revonsuo writes that "what from a psychological point of view is a 'traumatic experience' is, from a biological point of view, an instance of threat perception and threat-avoidance behavior."

==== Proposition 4 ====
The threatening dream content, while not an accurate depiction of one's real-time experience, seems incredibly realistic and is therefore effective and productive practice for threat-avoidance responses. He postulates that there is proof of this proposition in that dreamed action is consistent with real motor behavior and that "dreaming about an action is an identical process for cortical motor areas as actually carrying out the same action."

==== Proposition 5 ====
The perceptual and motor skills simulated in dreams will increase the efficiency of an individual's performance of those skills even if the dreams are not explicitly remembered. Studies have shown that the implicit learning of skills that are important for human performance can be learned and actualized without any conscious memory of having learned them. Furthermore, Revonsuo writes that "REM sleep physiology appears to selectively support implicit, procedural learning."

==== Proposition 6 ====
The threat-simulation system "was selected for during our evolutionary history," implying that it was not innate but rather came to be in response to the multitude of threats experienced by human ancestral populations. These populations lived in a "more or less constant post-traumatic state" and the dreaming brain constructed the threat-simulation technique as an evolutionary tool, resulting in improved threat-avoidance skills and, thus, a higher probability of survival.
