= The Psychologist (magazine) =

British journal

The Psychologist is the monthly publication of the British Psychological Society. It provides a forum for communication, discussion and controversy among all members of the society and it helps promote the advancement and diffusion of knowledge of psychology, pure and applied. The Psychologist is read by more than 50,000 members in print, and many non-members read the online version. It was launched in 1988, incorporating the existing Bulletin of the British Psychological Society. The 2016 issues are volume 29.

Dr Jon Sutton, who joined the Society in March 2000, from a psychology lectureship at Glasgow Caledonian University, is the Managing Editor.
